= Shajara-i Tarākima =

Chagatai-language historical work on the genealogy of Turkmens

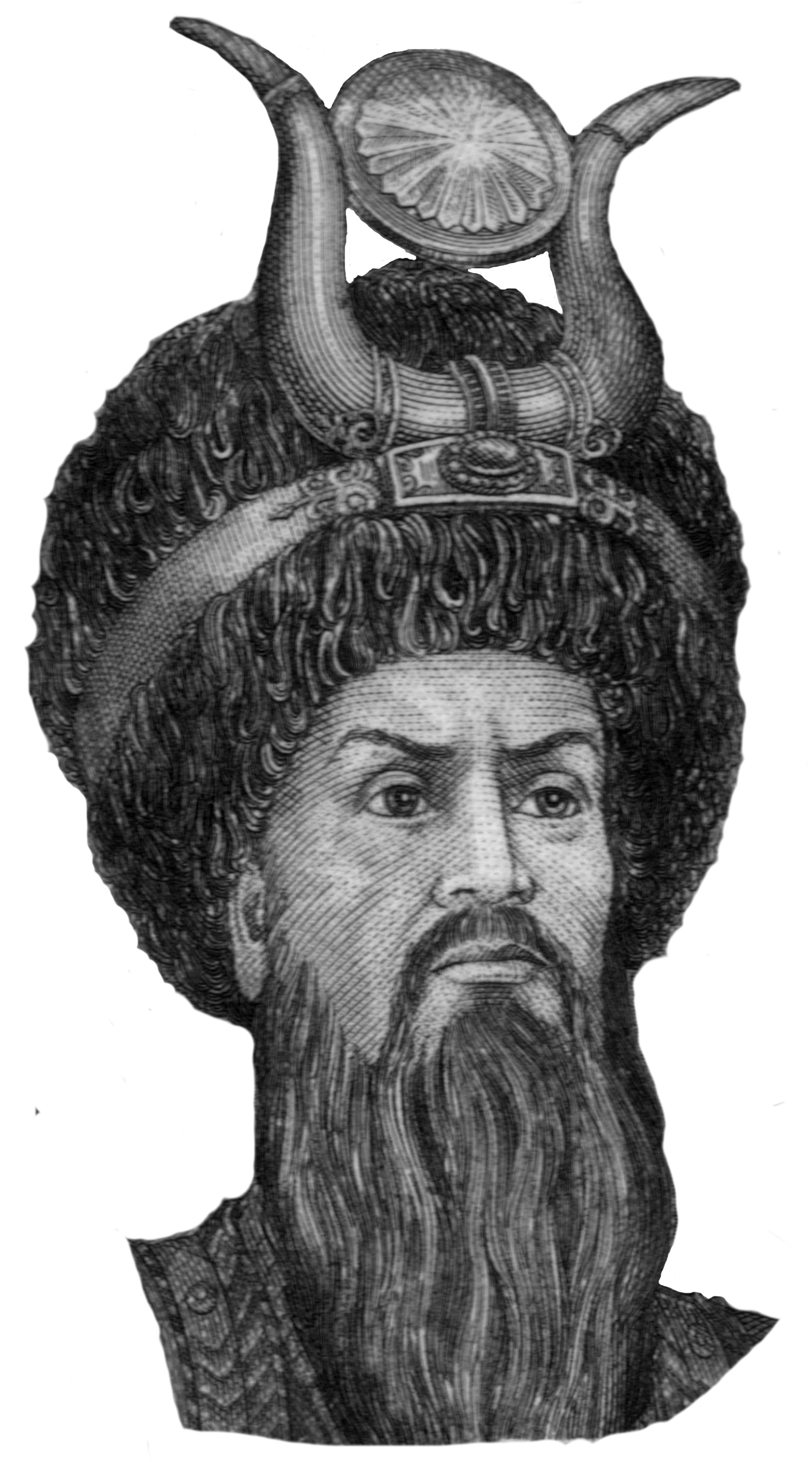
Oghuz Khan

Shajara-i Tarākima (Chagatay: شجرهٔ تراکمه, lit. 'Genealogy of the Turkmens') is a Chagatai-language historical work completed in 1659 by Khan of Khiva and historian Abu al-Ghazi Bahadur.

Shajara-i Tarākima is one of the two works composed by Abu al-Ghazi Bahadur that have great importance in learning Central Asian history, the other being the Shajara-i Turk (Genealogy of the Turks), which was completed by his son, Abu al-Muzaffar Anusha Muhammad Bahadur, in 1665. Shajara-i Tarākima describes the history of Turkmens since ancient times, the birth and life of the legendary ancient ancestor of all Turkmens and the progenitor hero of all Turkic peoples - Oghuz Khagan, his campaigns to conquer various countries and regions of Eurasia, as well as the rule of the Oghuz Turkmen khans in the Middle Ages. Shajara-i Tarākima is a significant literary work, as it describes numerous Turkmen folk legends, tales, etymologies of ethnonyms, proverbs and sayings.

According to Abu al-Ghazi, the Genealogy of the Turkmens was written "at the request of the Turkmen mullahs, sheikhs and begs", who believed that the previous Oğuznames were full of "errors and differences" and that it was necessary to give an official version of the legend of the origin of the Turkmens.

== Abu al-Ghazi Bahadur ==
Abu al-Ghazi Bahadur was the Khan of Khiva and a prominent historian of the Turkic peoples, who wrote his works in Chagatai language. He was born in 1603 in Urgench, Khanate of Khiva, the son of ruler Arab Muhammad Khan. He fled to the Safavid court in Isfahan after a power struggle arose among him and his brothers. He lived there in exile from 1629 until 1639 studying Persian and Arabic history. In 1644 or 1645 he acceded to the throne, a position he would hold for twenty years. He died in Khiva in 1663.

== Content ==
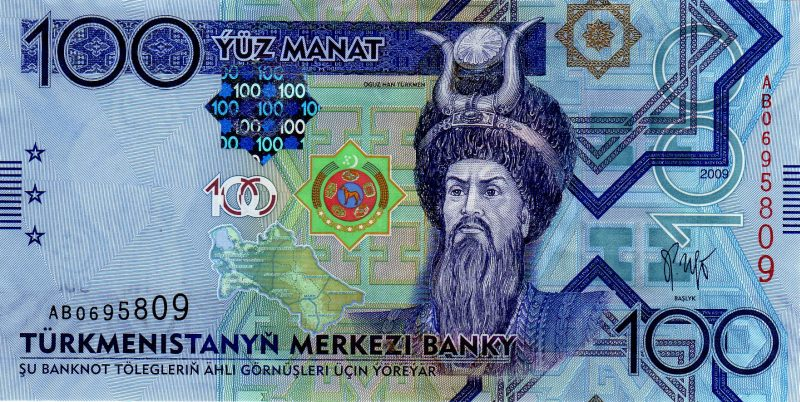
100 Turkmenistani manat banknote of Turkmenistan depicting Oghuz Khagan

Shajara-i Tarākima can be divided into three parts: information of a Quranic nature (the story of Adam); information based on the Turkmen epic, which includes the story of Oghuz Khaghann and his descendants, and information acquired through oral tradition about the origin, division and location of the Turkic tribal confederations (in particular, the legend of Salyr), about tamga, ongons, and others.

Shajara-i Tarākima roughly follows Rashid al-Din Hamadani’s already Islamized and Mongolized version of the origin of Oghuz Khaghan and Turkmens. But in his account, Oghuz Khan is fully integrated into Islamic and Mongol traditional history. The account begins with descent from Adam to Noah, who after the Biblical Flood sends his three sons to repopulate the earth: Ham was sent to Hindustan, Sam to Iran, and Yafes was sent to the banks of the Itil (Volga) and Yaik (Ural. Yafes had eight sons: Turk, Khazar, Saqlab, Rus, Ming, Chin, Kemeri, and Tarikh. As he was dying, he established Turk as his successor.

=== Tribal organization of Ancient Turkmens ===
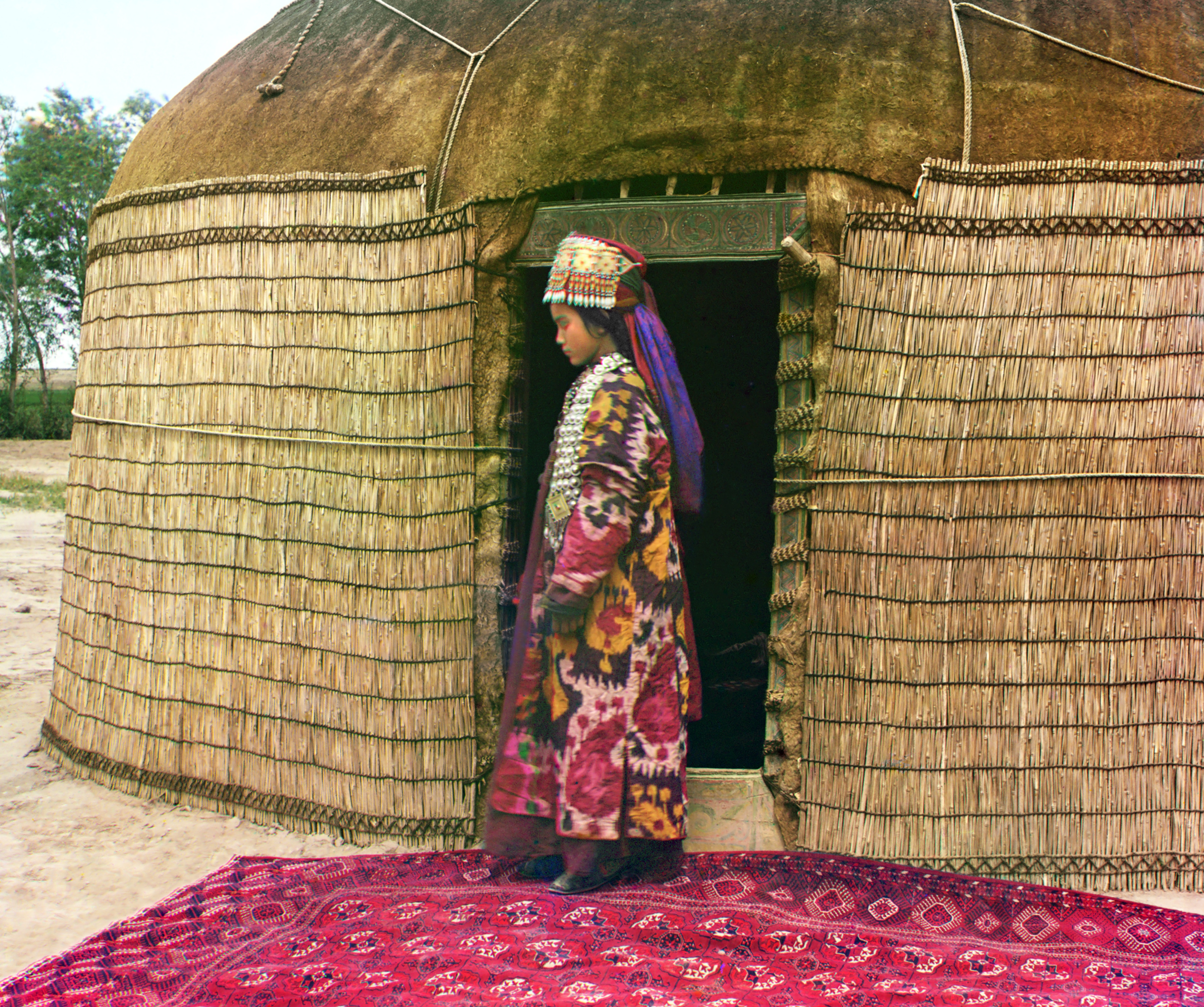
Turkmen woman at the entrance to a yurt in Turkestan; 1911 color photograph by Prokudin-Gorskii

According to the Genealogy of the Turkmens, Oghuz Khan had six sons, each of whom had four sons from their first wives and several more from their other wives. Twenty-four grandsons from the first wives of the sons of Oghuz Khan were the ancestors of the 24 oldest and main Oghuz Turkmen tribes and the heads of the Aimak. Each of the main 24 tribes was joined by other tribes whose ancestors were the grandsons of Oghuz Khan from the secondary wives of his sons and so on: this is the main association of several clans that formed a single Aimal.

Two united Aimaks formed yuzluks. Yuzluks, in turn, were grouped into two main groups: Bozoks (senior tribes) and Uchoks (junior tribes). Thus, the ancient Turkmen were divided into two parts, Bozoks and Uchoks. Each of these was divided into 12 yuzluks, and each of the yuzluks was divided into two Aimaks.

24 Oghuz Turkmen tribes according to the Genealogy of the Turkmens by Abu al-Ghazi Bahadur:

Bozoks (Gray Arrows)

Gün Han

- Kayı (the Ottoman dynasty and the Candar dynasty)
- Bayat (Qajars, Dulkadirids, Fuzûlî)
- Alkaevli
- Karaevli

Ay Han

- Yazır
- Döger (Artuqids)
- Dodurga
- Yaparlı

Yyldyz Han

- Afshar (Afsharids and Zengids)
- Qiziq
- Begdili (Khwarazmian dynasty )
- Kargın

Üçoks (Three Arrows)

Gök Han

- Bayandur (founders of the Aq Qoyunlu, Qara Qoyunlu)
- Pecheneg (Pechenegs)
- Çavuldur (Tzachas)
- Chepni

Dag Han

- Salur (Kadi Burhan al-Din, Salghurids and Karamanids; see also: Salar people)
- Eymür
- Alayuntlu
- Yüreğir (Ramadanids)

Dengiz Han

- Iğdır
- Büğdüz
- Yıwa (Qara Qoyunlu and Oghuz Yabgu State)
- Kınık (founders of the Seljuk Empire)

List of ancient Turkmen tribes whose forefathers were born from the younger wives of Oghuz Khaghan's sons:

Kene - Gune - Turbatly - Gireyli - Soltanly - Okly - Gekly - Kyrgyz - Suchly - Horasanly - Yurtchy - Jamchy - Turumchy - Kumy - Sorky - Kurjyk - Sarajyk - Karajyk - Tekin - Kazygurt - Lala - Merdeshuy - Sayir.

The list of tribes whose ancestors were leaders in the army and close associates of Oghuz Khan, and which were considered part of the Turkmens in ancient times and the Middle Ages:

Kankalis - Kipchaks - Karluks - Khalaj people

== Edition ==
- Ebülgâzî Bahadir Han (Khan of Khorezm), Shejere-i Terākime, Simurg, 1996, ISBN 975-7172-09-X, ISBN 978-975-7172-09-3

== See also ==
- Oghuz Turks
- Turkic peoples
- Turkmens
- Dede Korkut
- Khanate of Khiva
