= Oghuz Turks =

Western Turkic people

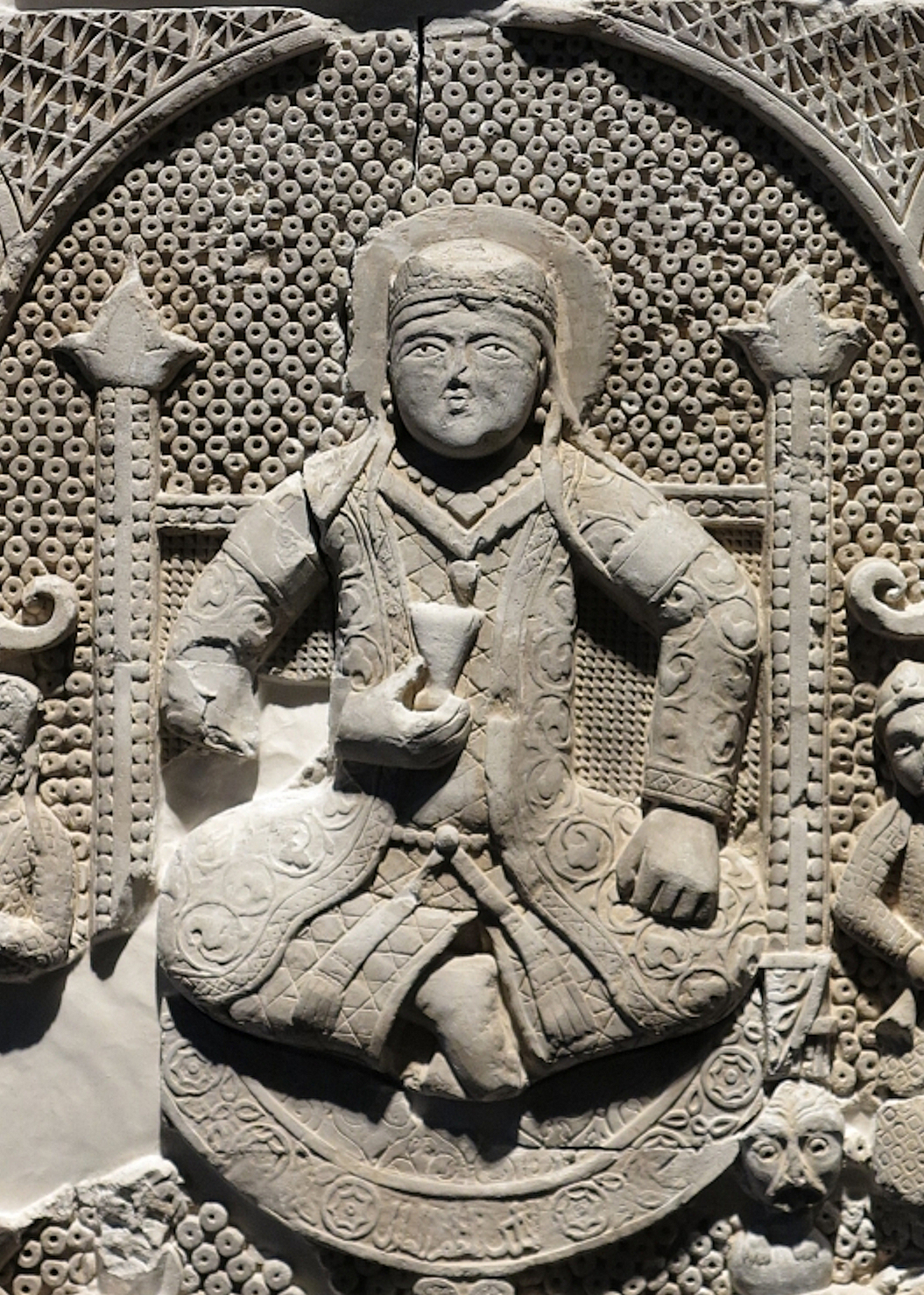
- Enthroned figure usually identified as the last Oghuz Turk Seljuk Empire ruler Tughril III (1176–1194), from Rayy, Iran. Philadelphia Museum of Art.

Regions with significant populations
- Before 11th century: Turkestan: From 11th century: Anatolia; Caucasus; Greater Khorasan; Cyprus; Mesopotamia; Balkans; North Africa

Languages
- Oghuz languages

Religion
- Predominantly Islam (Sunni; Alevi; Bektashi; Twelver Shia); Minority: Irreligion; Christianity; Judaism; Historical: Shamanism; Tengrism

Related ethnic groups
- Azerbaijanis; Turkmens; Turks

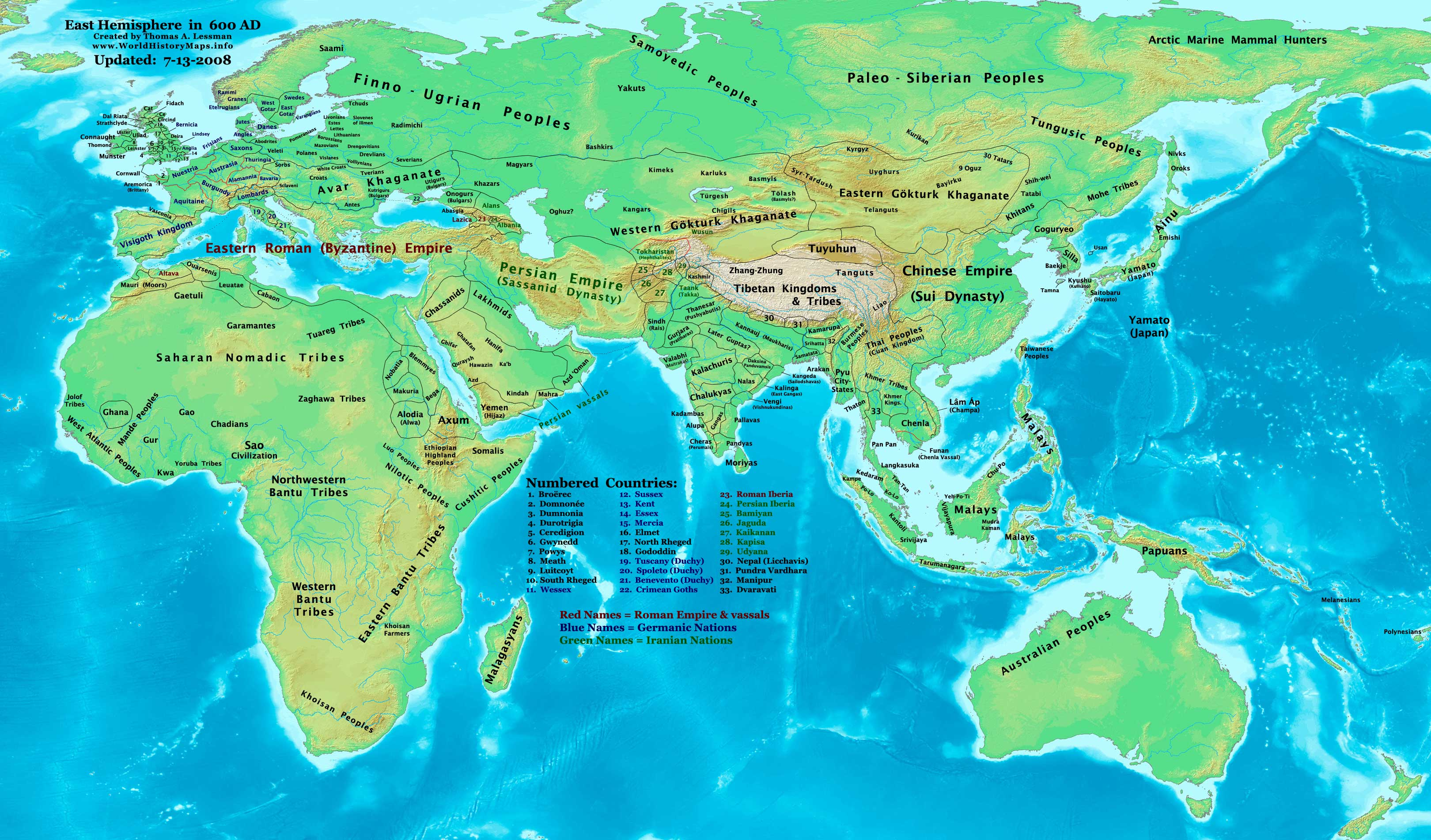
The Old World in 600 AD

The Oghuz Turks (Middle Turkic: ٱغُز, romanised: Oγuz) were a western Turkic people who spoke the Oghuz branch of the Turkic language family. In the 8th century, they formed a tribal confederation conventionally named the Oghuz Yabgu State in Central Asia. Today the Turkmen, Azerbaijanis and Turks are descendants of Oghuz Turks. The term Oghuz was gradually supplanted by the terms Turkmen and Turcoman (Ottoman Turkish: تركمن, romanised: Türkmen or Türkmân) by the 13th century.

The Oghuz confederation migrated westward from the Jetisu area after a conflict with the Karluk allies of the Uyghurs. In the 9th century, the Oghuz from the Aral steppes drove Pechenegs westward from the Emba and Ural River region. In the 10th century, the Oghuz inhabited the steppe of the rivers Sari-su, Turgai and Emba north of Lake Balkhash in modern-day Kazakhstan.

They embraced Islam and adapted their traditions and institutions to the Islamic world, emerging as empire-builders with a constructive sense of statecraft. In the 11th century, the Seljuk Oghuz clan entered Persia, where they founded the Great Seljuk Empire. The same century, a Tengriist Oghuz clan, also known as Uzes or Torks, overthrew Pecheneg supremacy in the frontier of the Russian steppes; those who settled along the frontier were gradually Slavicized; the almost feudal Black Hat principality grew with its own military aristocracy. Others, harried by the Kipchak Turks, crossed the lower Danube and invaded the Balkans, where they were stopped by a plague and became mercenaries for the Byzantine imperial forces (1065). Oghuz warriors served in almost all Islamic armies of the Middle East from the 1000s onwards, and as far as Spain and Morocco.

In the late 13th century after the fall of the Seljuks, the Ottoman dynasty gradually conquered Anatolia with an army also predominantly of Oghuz, besting other local Oghuz Turkish states. In legend, the founder Osman's genealogy traces to Oghuz Khagan, the legendary ancient ancestor of Turkic people, giving the Ottoman sultans primacy among Turkish monarchs. The dynasties of Khwarazmians, Qara Qoyunlu, Aq Qoyunlu, Afsharids and Qajars are also believed to descend from the Oghuz-Turkmen tribes of Begdili, Yiva, Bayandur, Kayi and Afshar respectively.

== Name and language ==
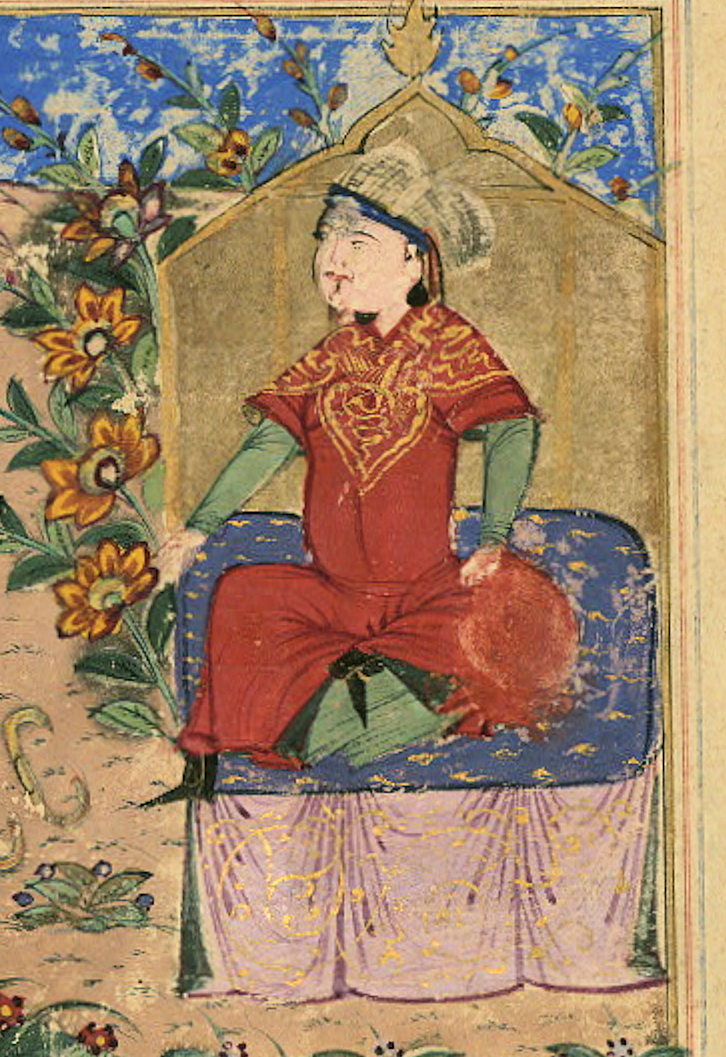
Oghūz Khān in the Majma' al-tawarikh (circa 1425)

The name Oghuz is a Common Turkic word for "tribe". By the 10th century, Islamic sources were calling them Muslim Turkmens, as opposed to those of Tengrist or Buddhist religion; and by the 12th century this term was adopted into Byzantine usage, as the Oghuzes were overwhelmingly Muslim. The name "Oghuz" fell out of use by 13th century.

Linguistically, the Oghuz belong to the Common Turkic speaking group, characterised by sound correspondences such as Common Turkic /-ʃ/ versus Oghuric /-l/ and Common Turkic /-z/ versus Oghuric /-r/. Within the Common Turkic group, the Oghuz languages share these innovations: loss of Proto-Turkic gutturals in suffix anlaut, loss of /ɣ/ except after /a/, /ɡ/ becoming either /j/ or lost, voicing of /t/ to /d/ and of /k/ to /ɡ/, and */ð/ becomes /j/.

Their language belongs to the Oghuz group of the Turkic languages family. Kara-Khanid scholar Mahmud al-Kashgari wrote that of all the Turkic languages, that of the Oghuz was the simplest. He also observed that long separation had led to clear differences between the western Oghuz and Kipchak language and that of the eastern Turks. Byzantine sources call Oghuz Turks Uzes (Οὖζοι, Ouzoi).

== Origins ==
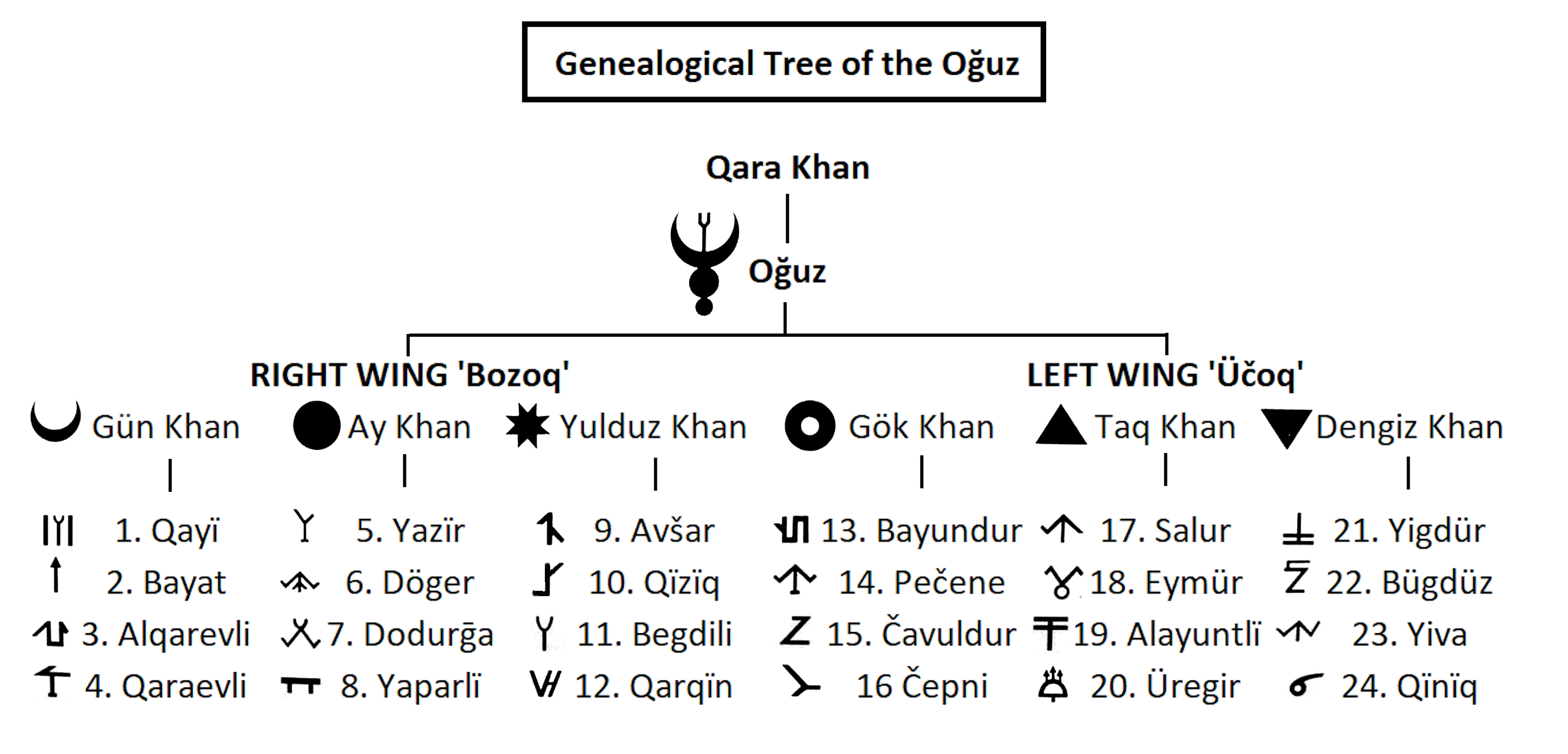
Genealogical tree of the Oghuz with Tamghas.

According to historians and linguists, the Proto-Turkic language originated in Central-East Asia, potentially in Altai-Sayan region, Mongolia or Tuva. Initially, Proto-Turkic speakers were potentially both hunter-gatherers and farmers, but later became nomadic pastoralists. Early and medieval Turkic groups exhibited a wide range of both East Asian and West-Eurasian physical appearances and genetic origins, in part through long-term contact with neighbouring peoples such as Iranian, Mongolic, Tocharian, Uralic and Yeniseian peoples, and others.

In early times, they practiced a Tengrist religion, erecting many carved wooden funerary statues surrounded by simple stone balbal monoliths and holding elaborate hunting and banqueting rituals.

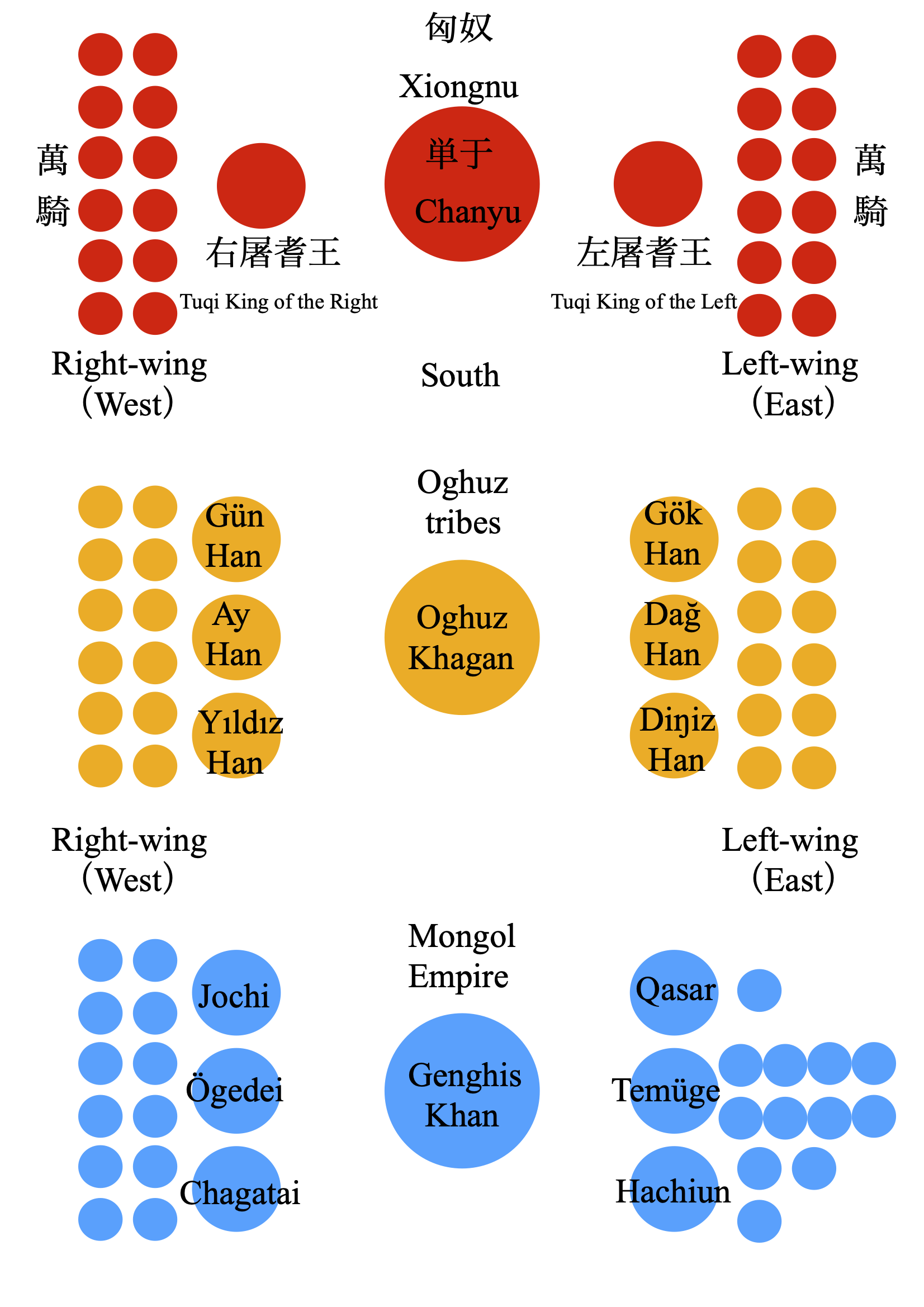
Basic forms of nomadic state from Xiongnu to Mongol

During the 2nd century BC, according to ancient Chinese sources, a steppe tribal confederation known as the Xiongnu and their allies, the Wusun defeated the neighbouring Yuezhi and drove them out of western China and into Central Asia. Various scholarly theories link the Xiongnu to Turkic peoples and/or the Huns. Bichurin claimed that the first usage of the word Oghuz appears to have been the title of Oğuz Kağan, whose biography shares similarities with the account, recorded by Han Chinese, of Xiongnu leader Modu Shanyu (or Mau-Tun), who founded the Xiongnu Empire. However, Oghuz Khan narratives were actually collected in Compendium of Chronicles by Ilkhanid scholar Rashid-al-Din in the early 14th century.

Sima Qian recorded the name Wūjiē 烏揭 (LHC: *ʔɔ-gɨat) or Hūjiē 呼揭 (LHC: *xɔ-gɨat), of a people hostile to the Xiongnu and living immediately west of them, in the area of the Irtysh River, near Lake Zaysan. Golden suggests that these might be Chinese renditions of *Ogur ~ *Oguz, yet uncertainty remains. According to one theory, Hūjiē is just another transliteration of Yuezhi and may refer to the Turkic Uyghurs; however, this is controversial and has few scholarly adherents.

Yury Zuev (1960) links the Oghuz to the Western Turkic tribe 姑蘇 Gūsū < (MC *kuo-suo) in the 8th-century encyclopaedia Tongdian (or erroneously Shǐsū 始蘇 in the 11th century Zizhi Tongjian). Zuev also notes two parallel passages:

- one from the 8th-century Taibo Yinjing (太白陰經) "Venus's Secret Classic" by Li Quan (李筌) which mentioned the 三窟 ~ 三屈 "Three Qu" (< MC *k^{(h)}ɨut̚) after the 十箭 Shí Jiàn "Ten Arrows" (OTrk 𐰆𐰣:𐰸 On Oq) and Jĭu Xìng "Nine Surnames" (OTrk 𐱃𐰸𐰆𐰔:𐰆𐰍𐰔 Toquz Oğuz); and
- another from al-Maṣudi's Meadows of Gold and Mines of Gems, which mentioned the three hordes of the Turkic Ġuz.

Based on those sources, Zuev proposes that in the 8th century the Oghuzes were located outsides of the Ten Arrows' jurisdiction, west of the Altai Mountains, near lake Issyk-Kul, Talas river's basin and seemingly around the Syr Darya basin, and near the Chumul, Karluks, Qays, Quns, Śari, etc. who were mentioned by al-Maṣudi and Sharaf al-Zaman al-Marwazi.

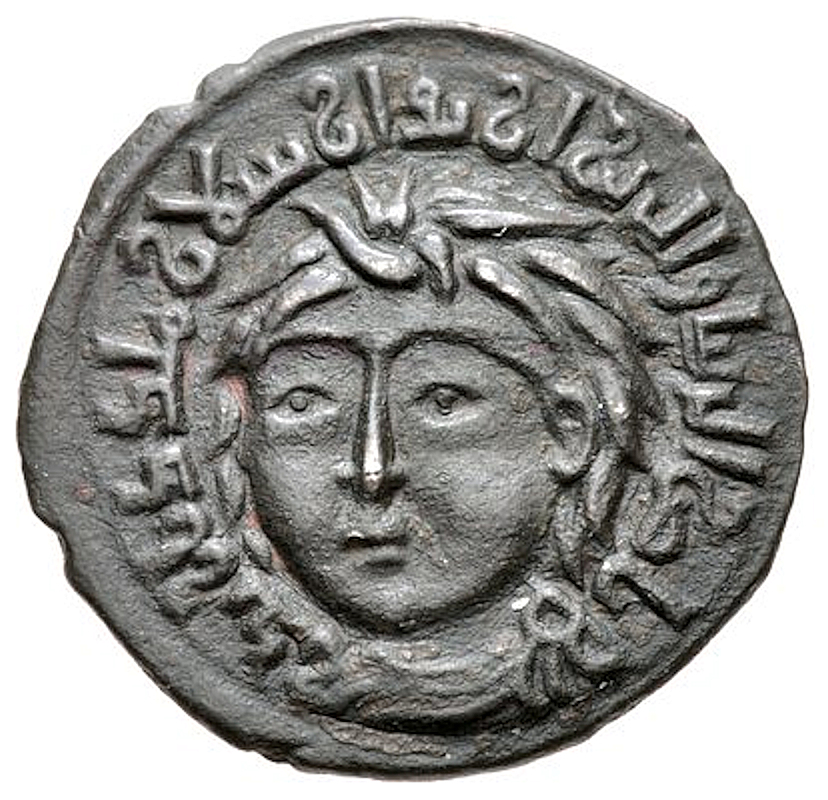
Male bust on a coin of Nasir al-Din Artuq Arslan, an Oghuz Döğer ruler of the Artuqid dynasty, Mardin, dated AH 611 (1214-5 CE)

According to Ahmad ibn Fadlan, the Oghuz were nomads, but also had cultivated crops, and the economy was based on a semi-pastoralist lifestyle.

Byzantine emperor Constantine VII Porphyrogennetos mentioned the Uzi and Mazari (Hungarians) as neighbours of the Pechenegs.

By the time of the Orkhon inscriptions (8th century AD) "Oghuz" was being applied generically to all inhabitants of the Göktürk Khaganate. Within the khaganate, the Oghuz community gradually expanded, incorporating other tribes. A number of subsequent tribal confederations bore the name Oghuz, often affixed to a numeral indicating the number of united tribes. These include references to the simple Oguz, Üch-Oghuz ("three Oghuz"), Altï Oghuz ("six Oghuz"), possibly the Otuz Oghuz ("thirty Oghuz"), Sekiz-Oghuz ("eight Oghuz"), and the Tokuz-Oghuz ("nine Oghuz"), who originally occupied different areas in the vicinity of the Altai Mountains. Golden (2011) states Transoxanian Oghuz Turks who founded the Oghuz Yabgu State were not the same tribal confederation as the Toquz Oghuz from whom emerged the founders of Uyghur Khaganate. Istakhri and Muhammad ibn Muhmad al-Tusi kept the Toquz Oghuz and Oghuz distinct and Ibn al-Faqih mentioned: "the infidel Turk-Oghuz, the Toquz-Oghuz, and the Qarluq" Even so, Golden notes the confusion in Latter Göktürks' and Uyghurs' inscriptions, where Oghuz apparently referred to Toquz Oghuz or another tribal grouping, who were also named Oghuz without a prefixed numeral; this confusion is also reflected in Sharaf al-Zaman al-Marwazi, who listed 12 Oghuz tribes, who were ruled by a "Toquz Khaqan" and some of whom were Toquz-Oghuz, on the border of Transoxiana and Khwarazm. At most, the Oghuz were possibly led by a core group of Toquz Oghuz clans or tribes.

Noting that the mid-8th-century Tariat inscriptions, in Uyghur khagan Bayanchur's honour, mentioned the rebellious Igdir tribe who had revolted against him, Klyashtorny considers this as one piece of "direct evidence in favour of the existence of kindred relations between the Tokuz Oguzs of Mongolia, The Guzs of the Aral region, and modern Turkmens", besides the facts that Kashgari mentioned the Igdir as the 14th of 22 Oghuz tribes; and that Igdirs constitute part of the Turkmen tribe Chowdur. The Shine Usu inscription, also in Bayanchur's honour, mentioned the Nine-Oghuzes as "[his] people" and that he defeated the Eight-Oghuzes and their allies, the Nine Tatars, three times in 749.; according to Klyashtorny and Czeglédy, eight tribes of the Nine-Oghuzes revolted against the leading Uyghur tribe and renamed themselves Eight-Oghuzes.

Ibn al-Athir, an Arab historian, claimed that the Oghuz Turks were settled mainly in Transoxiana, between the Caspian and Aral Seas, during the period of the caliph Al-Mahdi (after 775 AD). By 780, the eastern parts of the Syr Darya were ruled by the Karluk Turks and to their west were the Oghuz. Transoxiana, their main homeland in subsequent centuries became known as the "Oghuz Steppe".

During the period of the Abbasid caliph Al-Ma'mun (813–833), the name Oghuz starts to appear in the works of Islamic writers. The Book of Dede Korkut, a historical epic of the Oghuz, contains historical echoes of the 9th and 10th centuries but was likely written several centuries later.

== Physical appearance ==
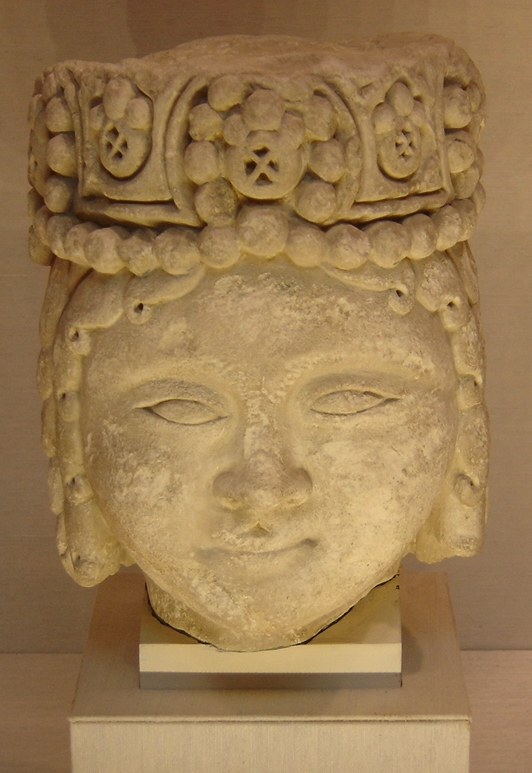
Head of male Seljuk royal figure, 12–13th century, from Iran.

Al-Masudi described Yangikent's Oghuz Turks as "distinguished from other Turks by their valour, their slanted eyes, and the smallness of their stature". Stone heads of Seljuq elites kept at the New York Metropolitan Museum of Art displayed East Asian features. Over time, Oghuz Turks' physical appearance changed. Rashid al-Din Hamadani stated that "because of the climate their features gradually changed into those of Tajiks. Since they were not Tajiks, the Tajik peoples called them turkmān, i.e. Turk-like (Turk-mānand)". (Note: This folk-etymology had been attested in Al-Biruni and Mahmud al-Kashgari, the latter a native Middle Turkic speaker. However, this mixed Turkic-Persian etymology is now considered incorrect; instead, Türkmen is now etymologised as from ethnonym Türk plus strengthening suffix -men, meaning "'most Turkish of the Turks' or 'pure-blooded Turks.'".) Ḥāfiẓ Tanīsh Mīr Muḥammad Bukhārī also related that the "Oghuz Turkic face did not remain as it was after their migration into Transoxiana and Iran". Khiva khan, Abu al-Ghazi Bahadur, in his Chagatai-language treatise Genealogy of the Turkmens, wrote that "their (Oghuz Turks) chin started to become narrow, their eyes started to become large, their faces started to become small, and their noses started to become big after five or six generations". Ottoman historian Mustafa Âlî commented in Künhü'l-ʾaḫbār that Anatolian Turks and Ottoman elites are ethnically mixed: "Most of the inhabitants of Rûm are of confused ethnic origin. Among its notables there are few whose lineage does not go back to a convert to Islam."

== Social units ==
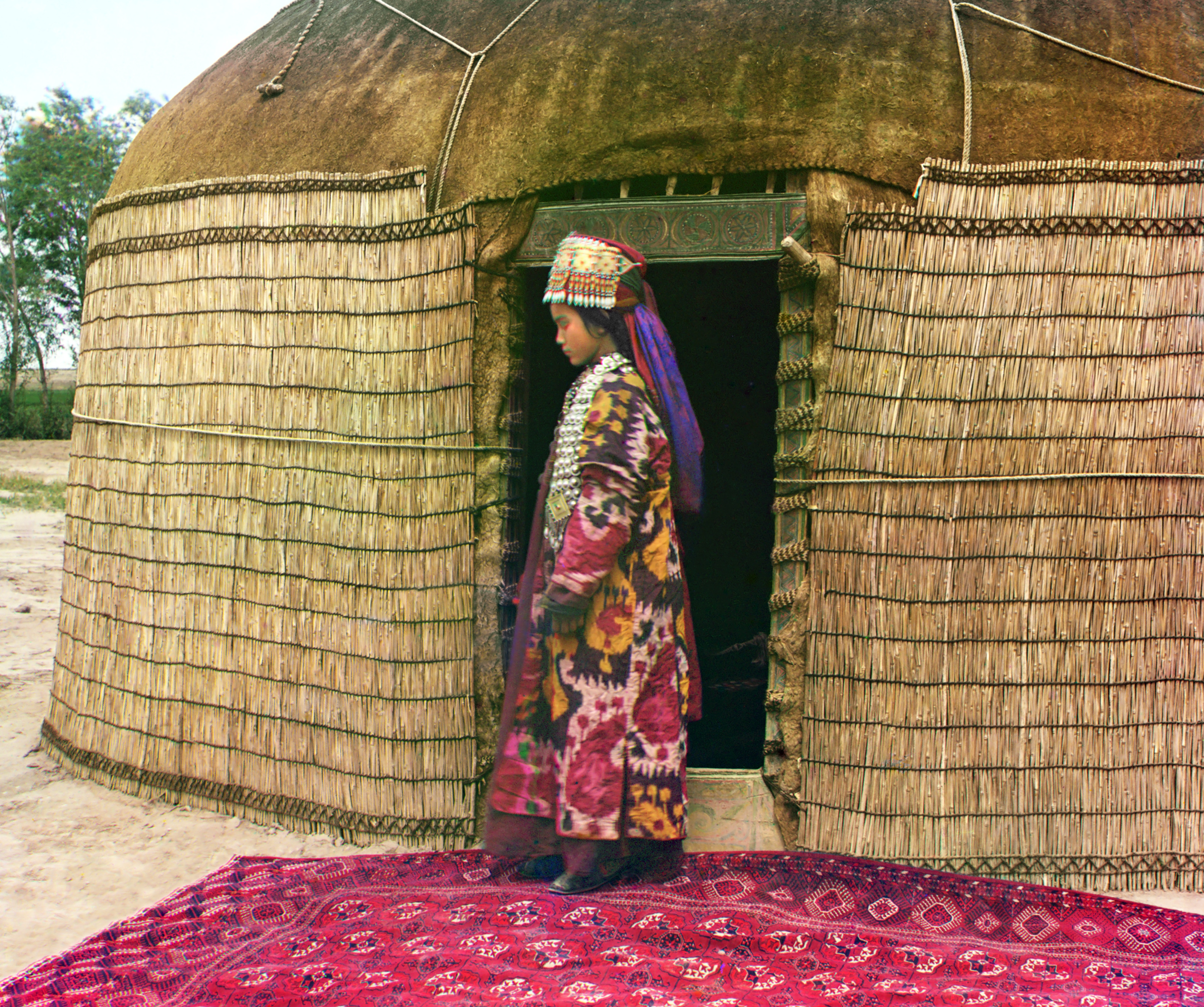
Turkmen woman at the entrance to a yurt in Turkestan; 1911 colour photograph by Prokudin-Gorskii

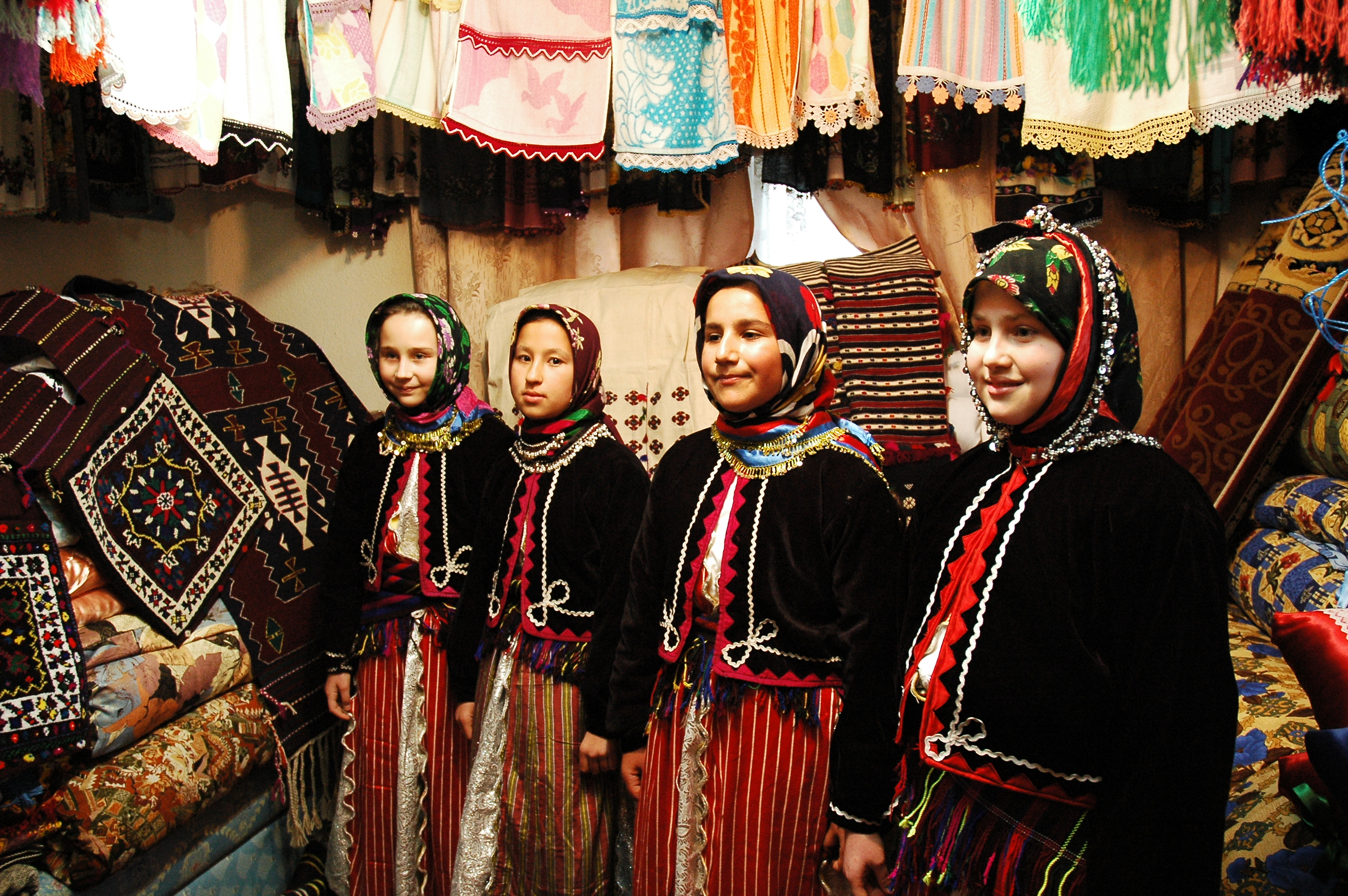
Traditional Yoruk clothes, Dursunbey, Balikesir Province

The militarism that the Oghuz empires were very well known for was rooted in their centuries-long nomadic lifestyle. In general, they were a herding society which possessed certain military advantages that sedentary societies did not have, particularly mobility. Alliances by marriage and kinship, and systems of "social distance" based on family relationships were the connective tissues of their society.

In Oghuz traditions, "society was simply the result of the growth of individual families". But such a society also grew by alliances and the expansion of different groups, normally through marriages. The shelter of the Oghuz tribes was a tent-like dwelling, erected on wooden poles and covered with skin, felt, or hand-woven textiles, which is called a yurt.

Their cuisine included yahni (stew), kebabs, Toyga soup (meaning "wedding soup"), Kımız (a traditional drink of the Turks, made from fermented horse milk), Pekmez (a syrup made of boiled grape juice) and helva made with wheat starch or rice flour, tutmac (noodle soup), yufka (flattened bread), katmer (layered pastry), chorek (ring-shaped buns), bread, clotted cream, cheese, yogurt, milk and ayran (diluted yogurt beverage), as well as wine.

Social order was maintained by emphasising "correctness in conduct as well as ritual and ceremony". Ceremonies brought together the scattered members of the society to celebrate birth, puberty, marriage, and death. Such ceremonies had the effect of minimising social dangers and also of adjusting persons to each other under controlled emotional conditions.

Patrilineally related men and their families were regarded as a group with rights over a particular territory and were distinguished from neighbours on a territorial basis. Marriages were often arranged among territorial groups so that neighbouring groups could become related, but this was the only organising principle that extended territorial unity. Each community of the Oghuz Turks was thought of as part of a larger society composed of distant as well as close relatives. This signified "tribal allegiance". Wealth and materialistic objects were not commonly emphasised in Oghuz society and most remained herders, and when settled they would be active in agriculture.

Status within the family was based on age, gender, relationships by blood, or marriageability. Males, as well as females, were active in society, yet men were the backbones of leadership and organisation. According to the Book of Dede Korkut, which demonstrates the culture of the Oghuz Turks, women were "expert horse riders, archers, and athletes". The elders were respected as repositories of both "secular and spiritual wisdom".

== Homeland in Central Asia ==
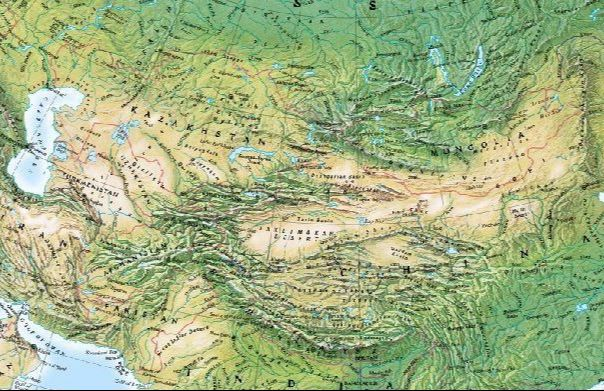
Physical map of Central Asia from the Caucasus in the northwest, to Mongolia in the northeast.

In the 700s, the Oghuz Turks made a new home and domain for themselves in the area between the Caspian and Aral seas and the northwest part of Transoxania, along the Syr Darya river. They had moved westward from the Altay mountains passing through the Siberian steppes and settled in this region, and also penetrated into southern Russia and the Volga from their bases in west China. In the 11th century, the Oghuz Turks adopted Arabic script, replacing the Old Turkic alphabet.

In his accredited 11th-century treatise titled Dīwān Lughāt al-Turk, Karakhanid scholar Mahmud of Kashgar mentioned five Oghuz cities named Sabran, Sitkün, Qarnaq, Suğnaq, and Qaraçuq (the last of which was also known to Kashgari as Farab, now Otrar; situated near the Karachuk Mountains to its east). The extension from the Karachuk Mountains towards the Caspian Sea was called the "Oghuz Steppe Lands" from where the Oghuz Turks established trading, religious and cultural contacts with the Abbasid Arab caliphate who ruled to the south. This is around the same time that they first converted to Islam and renounced their Tengriism belief system. The Arab historians mentioned that the Oghuz Turks were ruled by a number of kings and chieftains.

It was in this area that they later founded the Seljuk Empire, and it was from this area that they spread west into western Asia and eastern Europe during Turkic migrations from the 9th until the 12th century. The founders of the Ottoman Empire were also Oghuz Turks.

== Literature and poetry ==
Oghuz Turkish literature includes the famous Book of Dede Korkut which was UNESCO's 2000 literary work of the year, as well as the Oghuzname, Battalname, Danishmendname, Köroğlu epics which are part of the literary history of Azerbaijanis, Turks of Turkey and Turkmens. The modern and classical literature of Azerbaijan, Turkey and Turkmenistan are also considered Oghuz literature since it was produced by their descendants.

The Book of Dede Korkut is a valuable collection of epics and stories, bearing witness to the language, the way of life, religions, traditions, and social norms of the Oghuz Turks in Azerbaijan, Turkey, Iran (West Azerbaijan, Golestan) and parts of Central Asia including Turkmenistan.

== Oghuz and Yörüks ==
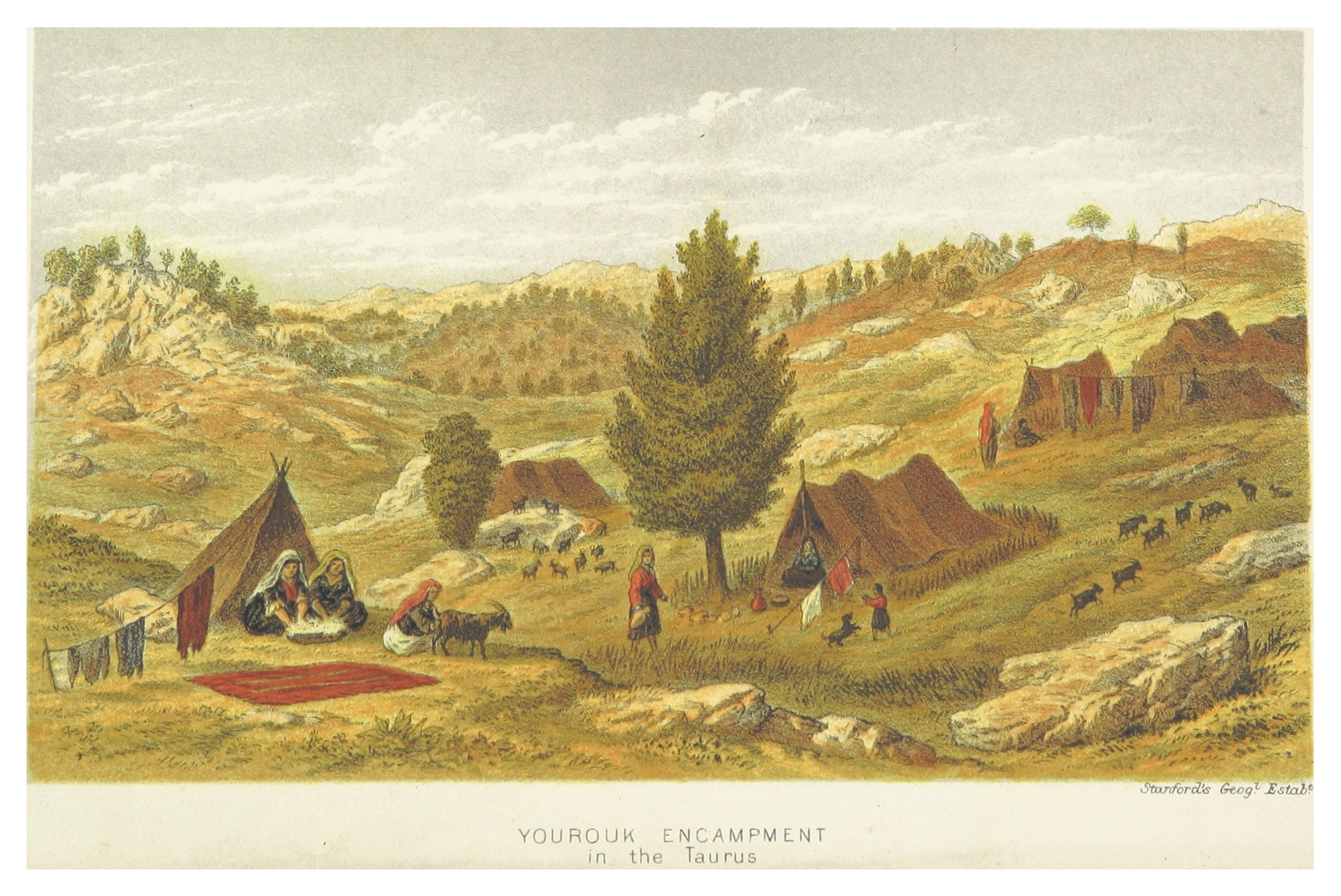
Yörük camp in Taurus Mountains, 19th century

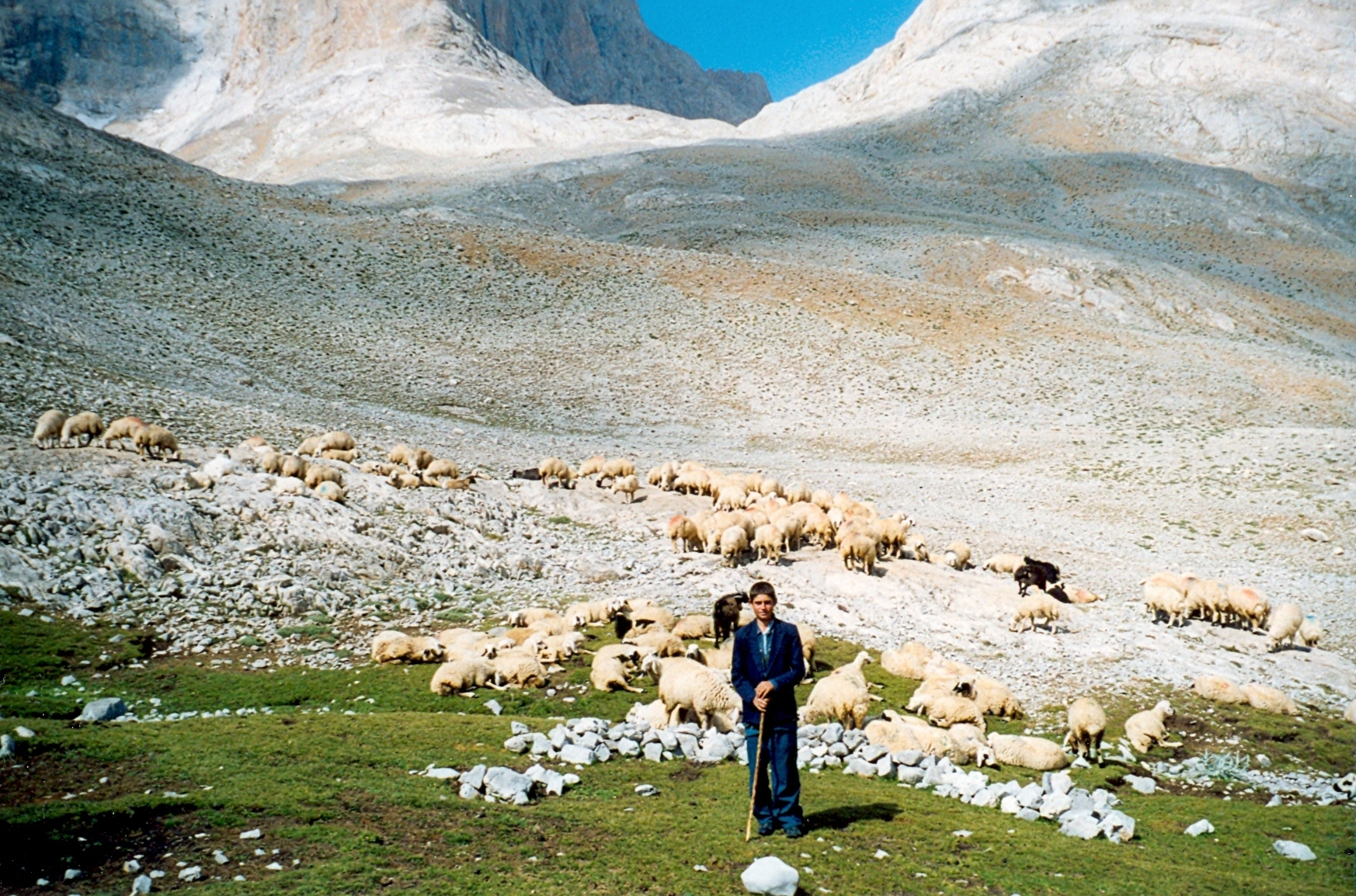
Yörük shepherd in the Taurus Mountains.

Yörüks are Turkish subgroup of Oghuz origin, some of whom are still semi-nomadic, primarily inhabiting the mountains of Anatolia and partly Balkan peninsula.

In the medieval era, to distinguish their own loyal Sunni Turkomans from the Shah-loyal Shiite Kızılbaş Turkomans of eastern Anatolia and Azerbaijan, Ottoman governors coined the blanket term Yörük (or Yürük), meaning "nomad" or "wanderer." This served as a political demarcation between western (Ottoman Turkic) and eastern (Persian-influenced) Turkoman groups.

Despite being politically divided between the Ottoman Turks and the Persian-influenced eastern realms, Eastern and Western Turkomans were ethnically and linguistically the same, differing only in minor dialectal or cultural aspects.

The Yörük to this day appear as a distinct segment of the population of Macedonia and Thrace where they settled as early as the 14th century. While today the Yörük are increasingly settled, many of them still maintain their nomadic lifestyle, breeding goats and sheep in the Taurus Mountains and further eastern parts of mediterranean regions (in southern Anatolia), in the Pindus (Epirus, Greece), the Šar Mountains (North Macedonia), the Pirin and Rhodope Mountains (Bulgaria) and Dobrudja.

An earlier offshoot of the Yörüks, the Kailars or Kayılar Turks were amongst the first Turkish colonists in Europe, (Kailar or Kayılar being the Turkish name for the Greek town of Ptolemaida which took its current name in 1928) formerly inhabiting parts of the Greek regions of Thessaly and Macedonia. Settled Yörüks could be found until 1923, especially near and in the town of Kozani.

== List of Oghuz dynasties ==
- Oghuz Yabgu State
- Pechenegs
- Seljuks
- Zengid dynasty
- Anatolian beyliks
- Khwarazmian dynasty
- Rasulid dynasty
- Ottomans
- Aq Qoyunlu
- Kara Koyunlu
- Safavid
- Afsharids
- Qajars
- Azerbaijani khanates

== Traditional tribal organisation ==
The Great Seljuq Empire in 1092, upon the death of Malik Shah I

Mahmud al-Kashgari listed 22 Oghuz tribes in Dīwān Lughāt al-Turk. Kashgari further wrote that "In origin they are 24 tribes, but the two Khalajiyya tribes are distinguished from them [the twenty-two] in certain respects (Note: Arabic: انفردتا عنها ببعض الأشياء, romanized: ʾinfaradatā ʿanhā bi-baʿḍi'l-ʾašyāʾ; alternative translation: "separated from them with some of the belongings".) and so are not counted among them. This is the origin".

Later, Charuklug from Kashgari's list would be omitted. Rashid-al-Din and Abu al-Ghazi Bahadur added three more: Kïzïk, Karkïn, and Yaparlï, to the list in Jami' al-tawarikh (Compendium of Chronicles) and Shajare-i Türk (Genealogy of the Turks), respectively. According to Selçukname, Oghuz Khagan had six children (Sun – Gün, Moon – Ay, Star – Yıldız, Sky – Gök, Mountain – Dağ, Sea – Diŋiz), and all six would become Khans themselves, each leading four tribes.

=== Bozoks (Grey Arrows) ===
Gün Han

- Kayı (Ottomans, Jandarids and Chobanids)
- Bayat (Qajars, Dulkadirids, Fuzûlî)
- Alkaevli
- Karaevli

Ay Han

- Yazır (disambiguation)
- Döger (Artuqids)
- Dodurga
- Yaparlı

Yıldız Han

- Afshar (Afsharids and Zengids)
- Qiziq
- Begdili (Khwarazmian dynasty)
- Kargın

=== Üçoks (Three Arrows) ===
Gök Han

- Bayandur (founders of the Aq Qoyunlu)
- Pecheneg
- Çavuldur (Tzachas)
- Chepni (refer to Küresünni)

Dağ Han

- Salur (Kadi Burhan al-Din, Salghurids and Karamanids; see also: Salars)
- Eymür
- Alayuntlu
- Yüreğir (Ramadanids)

Diŋiz Han

- Iğdır
- Büğdüz
- Yıva (Qara Qoyunlu and Oghuz Yabgu State)
- Kınık (founders of the Seljuk Empire)

| Tribe name | Middle Turkic | Turkish language (Turkey) | Azerbaijani language (Azerbaijan) | Turkmen language (Turkmenistan) | Meaning | Ongon | Tamgha |
|---|---|---|---|---|---|---|---|
| Kayı (tribe) | Kayığ (قَيِغْ) | Kayı | Qayı | Gaýy | strong | Gyrfalcon (sungur) |
| Bayat (tribe) | Bayat (بَياتْ) | Bayat | Bayat | Baýat | rich | Eurasian eagle-owl (puhu) |
| Alkaevli (tribe) | Alkabölük (اَلْقابُلُكْ) | Alkaevli | Ağevli | Agöýli | white housed | Common kestrel (küyenek) |
| Karaevli (tribe) | Karabölük (قَرَبُلُكْ) | Karaevli | Qaraevli | Garaöýli | black housed | Lesser kestrel (küyenek sarı) |
| Yazır (tribe) | Yazgır (ىَزْغِرْ) | Yazır | Yazır | Ýazyr | spread | Merlin (turumtay) |
| Döğer | Tüger (تُوكَرْ) / (ثُكَرْ) | Döğer | Döğər | Tüwer | gatherer | ? (küçügen) |
| Dodurga | Tutırka (تُوتِرْقا) | Dodurga | Dodurqa | Dodurga | country gainer | ? (kızıl karcığay) |
| Yaparlı (tribe) | | Yaparlı | Yaparlı | Ýaparly | nice-smelling | ? |
| Afshar (tribe) | Afşar (اَفْشارْ) | Avşar, Afşar | Əfşar | Owşar | obedient, agile | Bonelli's eagle (cura laçın) |
| Qiziq | | Kızık | Qızıq | Gyzyk | forbidden | Northern goshawk (çakır) |
| Beğdili | Begtili (بَكْتِلى) | Beğdili | Bəydili | Begdili | reputable | Great crested grebe (bahri) |
| Karkın (tribe) | | Karkın, Kargın | Karqın | Garkyn | black leather | Northern goshawk (çakır) |
| Bayandur | Bayundur (بايُنْدُرْ) | Bayındır | Bayandur | Baýyndyr | wealthy soil | Peregrine falcon (laçın) |
| Pecheneg | Beçenek (بَجَنَكْ) | Peçenek | Peçeneq | Beçene | one who makes | Eurasian Magpie (ala toğunak) |
| Chowdur | Çuvaldar (جُوَلْدَرْ) | Çavuldur | Çavuldur | Çowdur | famous | ? (buğdayınık) |
| Chepni (tribe) | Çepni (جَبْني) | Çepni | Çəpni | Çepni | one who attacks the enemy |
| Salur (tribe) | Salgur (سَلْغُرْ) | Salur | Salur | Salyr | sword swinger | Golden eagle (bürgüt) |
| Ayrums | Eymür (اَيْمُرْ) | Eymür | Eymur | Eýmir | being good | Eurasian hobby (isperi) |
| Ulayuntluğ (tribe) | Ulayundluğ (اُوﻻيُنْدْلُغْ) | Ulayundluğ | Alayuntluq | Alaýöntli | with a pied horse | Red-footed falcon (yağalbay) |
| Yüreğir (tribe) | Üregir (اُرَكِرْ); Yüregir (يُرَكِرْ) | Yüreğir, Üreğir | Yürəgir | Üregir | order finder | ? biku |
| İğdir (tribe) | İgdir (اِكْدِرْ) | İğdir | Iğdır | Igdir | being good | Northern goshawk (karcığay) |
| Büğdüz (tribe) | Bügdüz (بُكْدُزْ) | Büğdüz | Bügdüz | Bügdüz | modest | Saker falcon (itelgi) |
| Yıva | Iwa (اِڤـا); Yıwa (يِڤـا) | Yıva | Yıva | Ywa | high ranked | Northern goshawk (tuygun) |
| Kınık (tribe) | Kınık (قِنِقْ) | Kınık | Qınıq | Gynyk | saint | Northern goshawk (cura karcığay) |

== List of Oghuz ethnic groups ==
- Azerbaijani people
- Qashqai people
- Gagauz people
- Turkish people
- Turkmen people
- Salar people

=== Other Oghuz sub-ethnic groups and tribes ===
==== Anatolia and Caucasus ====
Anatolia

- Abdal of Turkey
- Yörüks
- Tahtacı
- Varsak
- Barak
- Karakeçili (Black Goat Turkomans)
- Manav
- Atçeken
- Küresünni
- Chepni

Caucasus

- Azerbaijanis in Armenia
- Azerbaijanis in Turkey
- Azerbaijanis in Georgia
- Terekeme people
- Qarapapaq
- Karadaghis
- Javanshir clan
- Turkmen
- Turks in Abkhazia
- Meskhetian Turks

Cyprus

- Cypriot Turks

==== Balkans ====
- Turks in Bosnia
- Bulgarian Turks
- Turks in Croatia
- Dodecanese Turks
- Kosovan Turks
- Macedonian Turks
- Millets
- Turks in Serbia
- Turks in Montenegro
- Romanian Turks
- Turks of Western Thrace
- Cretan Turks
- Gajal
- Amuca tribe

==== Central Asia ====
- Iranian Azerbaijanis
- Shahsevan
- Qizilbash
- Padar tribe
- Khorasani Turks
- Iranian Turkmens
- Afghan Turkmens
- Qajars (tribe)
- Bichaghchi
- Turks in Afghanistan

==== Arab world ====
- Turks in Libya
- Turks in Egypt
- Turks in Algeria
- Syrian Turkmen
- Iraqi Turkmen
- Turks in Lebanon
- Turks in Palestine
- Turks in Jordan
- Turks in Tunisia
- Turks in Saudi Arabia
- Turks in Yemen

== See also ==
- Kureyshan
- Algoz
- Turkic migration
- History of Turkic peoples
- Timeline of Turks (500-1300)
- Turkomans

== Sources ==
- Barthold, V., ed. (1962). The book of my grandfather Korkut. Moscow and Leningrad: USSR Academy of Sciences.
- Damgaard, P. B.; et al. (9 May 2018). "137 ancient human genomes from across the Eurasian steppes". Nature. 557 (7705). Nature Research: 369–373. Bibcode:2018Natur.557..369D. doi:10.1038/s41586-018-0094-2. hdl:1887/3202709. PMID 29743675. S2CID 13670282.
- Findley, Carter V. (2005). The Turks in World History. Oxford University Press, USA. ISBN 978-0-19-517726-8.
- Golden, Peter B. (2011). Studies on the Peoples and Cultures of the Eurasian Steppes. Editura Academiei Române – Editura Istro. ISBN 978-973-27-2152-0.
- Lee, Joo-Yup; Kuang, Shuntu (18 October 2017). "A Comparative Analysis of Chinese Historical Sources and Y-DNA Studies with Regard to the Early and Medieval Turkic Peoples". Inner Asia. 19 (2). Brill: 197–239. doi:10.1163/22105018-12340089. ISSN 2210-5018.
- Li, Tao; et al. (June 2020). "Millet agriculture dispersed from Northeast China to the Russian Far East: Integrating archaeology, genetics, and linguistics". Archaeological Research in Asia. 22 100177. Elsevier. doi:10.1016/j.ara.2020.100177. hdl:21.11116/0000-0005-D82B-8.
- Nelson, Sarah; et al. (14 February 2020). "Tracing population movements in ancient East Asia through the linguistics and archaeology of textile production". Evolutionary Human Sciences. 2 (e5). Cambridge University Press: e5. doi:10.1017/ehs.2020.4. hdl:21.11116/0000-0005-AD07-1. PMC 10427276. PMID 37588355.
- Robbeets, Martine (1 January 2017). "Austronesian influence and Transeurasian ancestry in Japanese". Language Dynamics and Change. 8 (2). Brill: 210–251. doi:10.1163/22105832-00702005. hdl:11858/00-001M-0000-002E-8635-7. ISSN 2210-5832.
- Robbeets, Martine (2020). "The Transeurasian homeland: where, what and when?". In Robbeets, Martine; Savelyev, Alexander (eds.). The Oxford Guide to the Transeurasian Languages. Oxford University Press. ISBN 978-0-19-880462-8.
- Uchiyama, Junzo; et al. (21 May 2020). "Populations dynamics in Northern Eurasian forests: a long-term perspective from Northeast Asia". Evolutionary Human Sciences. 2 e16. Cambridge University Press. doi:10.1017/ehs.2020.11. hdl:21.11116/0000-0007-7733-A. PMC 10427466. PMID 37588381. Text was copied from this source, which is available under a Creative Commons Attribution 4.0 International License.
