= ALAT =

ALAT or Alat may refer to:

- Alat (company), Saudi technology and electronics manufacturing company
- Arun Alat, Indian singer/musician
- Alanine transaminase (ALAT), an enzyme
- Advanced load address table (ALAT), a functional unit in the Intel Itanium processor architecture
- French Army Light Aviation (Aviation légère de l’armée de Terre, ALAT)
- Alat, Russia, a rural locality in the Republic of Tatarstan, Russia
- Alat, alternative spelling of Olot, a town in Uzbekistan
- Ələt, a port town in Azerbaijan
- Alat tribe, a Turkic nomadic tribe
- Assistant Legal Attaché, a job at the FBI
