= Kureyshan =

Alevi-Kızılbaş community from Tunceli, Turkey

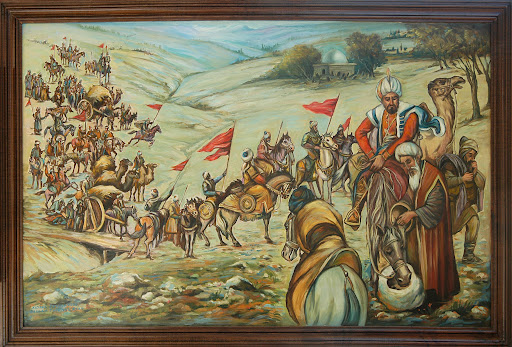
The Kureyşan Ocak Tribe

Kureyşan or Koreşan (Zaza and Kurdish: Kurêşan; Turkish Kureyşan) are an Alevi-Qizilbash community and religious lineage (ocak) primarily settled in the Tunceli region of Turkey.

While some historical studies link the tribe to the Beğdili clan of the Oghuz Turks, within the Alevi faith, the Kureyşan are revered as evlad-ı resul (descendants of the Islamic prophet Muhammad), tracing their spiritual and biological lineage to the Ahl al-Bayt. Members of the lodge are found across various provinces, including Tunceli, Erzincan, Adıyaman, and Gaziantep, maintaining a significant role in the socio-religious structure of regional Alevism.

== History ==
According to the oral lore, the ocak came to their current region from Khorasan or Kermanshah after the Mongol invasions.

According to legend, Kuresh lived in the village of Çeleqas (Balcalı), which is part of the Depe (Karakoçan) district of Elazığ, and later settled in the village of Zêve (located in Bostanlı) at the foot of Mount Duzgin Bawo. The forested area known as Zargovît was his kom, or winter pasture.

There is mention of seven consecutive Kuresh (Heft Kurêş) in Dersim. According to Kekil, mentioned above, in the village of Zêve or, Dewa Kurêsan/Kurêsû, where the Kures is said to have settled after Çeleqas, there are sites and dervish lodges associated with the "Heft Kurêş" (Seven Kuresh). First Kuresh, known as Kuresh, Hajji Kuresh or Sayyid Sheikh Mahmud al-Kabir, was born in 1141, and his tomb is located in the village of Zarar (Yukarı Kayabaşı) in the Cingife (Yavuzeli) district of Gaziantep. He is the son of Sheikh Mikail and was born in Hisn al-Mansur (Adıyaman), but as Mongol raids intensified, he left there and moved to the village of Çeleqas in Dersim, and from there he went to Zêve.

Kuresh is said to possess great miracles (karamat) and is loved and respected by the people. According to a one account, Ala ad-Din Kayqubad, the Seljuk Sultan of Rum, had him thrown into an oven so that he could prove he possessed these miraculous powers, he subsequently recognizing his sayyid status by sealing a genealogy (shajara). Historical records indicate that this document was intermittently inspected and reaffirmed by various Ottoman sovereigns, from Orhan to Mahmud I. The lineage of Kuresh is traced back to Musa al-Kazim, the seventh Shia Imam, and this account is presented as evidence.

According to Taş, the ocaks common ancestor was Sayyid Mahmud al-Kabir, a dervish who arrived in the Dersim region at the beginning of the 13th century. Descended from the Ahl al-Bayt, this dervish also used the pseudonym Quraysh to ensure that the name of Muhammad's tribe would not be forgotten. Some of those who stayed in the Mazgirt region also migrated to Nazımiye with the Kureysh after a while. Kureysh married there and had seven sons. Since his son named Haydar died at a young age, the lineage in Tunceli continued through his other six sons. Kureysh later left Nazımiye along with his numerous followers. After traveling to many places, he finally settled in Yukarı Kayabaşı, where he had another son named Sadr Kureysh.

The ocak also claims a connection with Sayyid Mahmud al-Khayrani, whose tomb is located in Akşehir. Taş notes that a branch of the tribe, including the al-Khayrani, migrated from Dersim to Central Anatolia, and supports this lore by citing the names Kureyş and similar ones found in Ottoman records at Central Anatolia. However, Çem and Gezik has questioned the theory that Mahmud al-Khayrani and Hajji Kuresh were connected. Gezik suggested that this may be a claim dating back to the 19th century, when attempts were made to establish organic ties between the Bektashi order and the Alevi Kurds.

== Etymology ==
When the term "Kureyş" is searched in Ottoman archival documents, it appears as a name for individuals, places, and communities. In these records, the word is transcribed in various forms such as Kureyş, Kureş, Kırış, Kuriş, Koriş, and Koraş. These variations stem from whether the letter ی (y/i) was included in the Ottoman script or from misreadings. For example, the name of the Kureyş District in 16th-century Karaman was written with the letter ی (y/i) in some instances and read as "Kureyş", while without it, it was read as Kuriş or Koriş. Occasionally, both versions appeared on different pages of the same register.

Diverse information exists regarding the meaning of the name "Koreşan." Various refs suggest it derives from Hacı Kureyş, the lodge's namesake, and that the word Kureyş itself is a colloquial adaptation of the terms Koreyşan/Horeysan/Khorasan.

Although members of the Koreşan lodge trace their lineage to Muhammad, the lodge's name does not originate from the Quraysh tribe of Muhammad. Koreşan is derived from the dervish whose name was Mahmud and title was Kureyş, and whose prophetic descent is verified by a shajara. "Koreşan" was formed by adding the Persian plural suffix "-an" to the name Kureyş.

Primarily, it is unlikely that the name of the Koreşan—defined as a Seyyid-lineage lodge tribe—originates from the Quraysh tribe. The following information is provided regarding the Koreşan:

"The Mongols departed from here and marched upon Tanza, where they committed similar atrocities before entering a valley near Tanza known as 'al-Kureyşiyye Valley.' This region and valley had abundant water refs but lacked gardens. However, due to the narrow paths, the local inhabitants of the al-Kureyşiyye Valley successfully prevented the Mongols from penetrating deeper during the ensuing clashes. The locals killed those they could, and the Mongols retreated without achieving their objectives." (Ibn al-Athir, 1987: 458)

The place name Tanza refers to a region near the Nazımiye pass leading from Erzincan to Tunceli.

According to local consensus, "Koreş" is a Zazaki word meaning Khorasan, and "Koraşan" means "person from Khorasan." Alternatively, "Koreşan" could imply an origin from Ghor or Kur, signifying those from the Ghor region of Afghanistan. The terms "Kur" and "Kurî" are frequently mentioned within the family. The initial letter of this word can be pronounced as a velar consonant (g) or as a glottal (Kh) depending on the region. Russian and Swedish scholars researching ethnic structures in Afghanistan and Turkestan report a large tribal group called "Khorasanlı", which reportedly includes the Koreşan Tribe.

Careful examination reveals no socio-cultural or economic similarity between the Koreşan Tribe and the Quraysh Tribe of Arabia.

== Branches ==
According to oral traditions and genealogical studies, the various branches of the Koreşan lodge are eponymous, derived from the names of prominent historical or semi-legendary figures. For instance, the Hüseynan (Uşenan) branch is linked to Hüseyin (Uşen); the Kaliyan to Kali; the Aliyan to Ali; and the Gulnan (Gulno) to Gülabi (Gulavi, Gulin, or simply Gul). Based on these traditional ancestral relations, the recognized branches of the Koreşan tribe include:

- Hüseynan (Uşenan)
- Gulnan (Gulno)
- Kaliyan
- Aliyan
- Valiyan
- Heman
- Süleymaniyan
- Çitan
- Kudan (Küdan or Gudan)
- Seyhan
- Gaziyan

These subdivisions reflect the complex social and spiritual hierarchy within the lodge, where each branch often maintains its own specific identity while remaining under the broader Koreşan umbrella.

== Settlements ==
After Tunceli, members of the ocak primarily live in Erzincan, Varto in Muş, and Bingöl, as well as the Yukarı Kayabaşı in Gaziantep and Kındırali in Adıyaman. While they speak Zaza in eastern Dersim region, a branch that serves as the spiritual leader of the Rutan tribe, residing along the Ovacık–Hozat border, speaks Kurmanji.
