= Olot (disambiguation) =

Olot may refer to:

- Olot, capital city of La Garrotxa, a comarca of Catalonia.
- UE Olot, Unió Esportiva Olot, a football club from Catalonia, Spain.
- Olot District, a district of Bukhara Region in Uzbekistan.
- Olot, Uzbekistan, the capital city of the Olot district in Uzbekistan.
- Olots or Olot people, an Oirat sub-ethnic group of Choros origin.
- Olot school, a group of catalan painters that created an artistic style in the second half of the 19th century.
- Olot Palot, a 2009 film by indian film director Swapan Saha.

== See also ==
- Haulotte
