= Garapapag =

- Qarapapaqs, are a Turkic sub-ethnic group of Azerbaijanis.
- Qarapapaq, is a village and municipality in the Qazakh Rayon of Azerbaijan.
- Qareh Papaq, is a village in Marhemetabad-e Jonubi Rural District.
