= Jean Jacques Pierre Desmaisons =

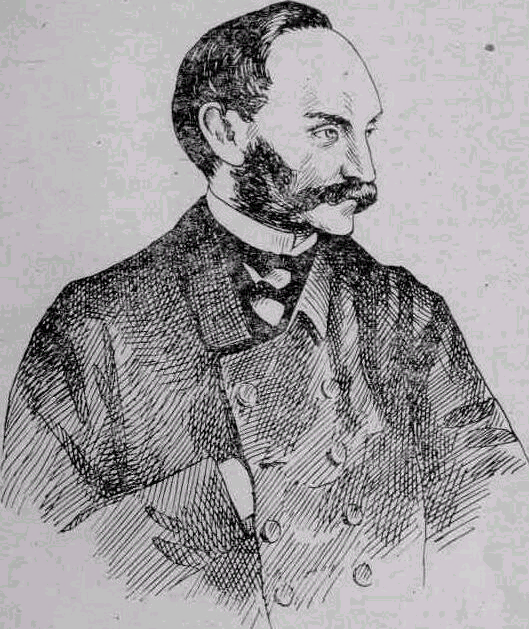
- Born: 27 April 1806; Chambéry, Mont-Blanc, First French Empire
- Died: 6 September 1873 (aged 67); Aix-les-Bains, Savoie, France
- Other name: Petr Ivanovich Demezon
- Citizenship: Savoyard, Russian, French
- Occupations: Orientalist, Turkologist, Diplomat, Translator

Jean Jacques Pierre Desmaisons (27 April 1806 – 6 September 1873), known in Russian as "Petr Ivanovich Demezon", was a Savoyard scholar, Russian diplomat and Sardinian baron. He was a translator from Persian and is known for compiling a Persian–French dictionary.

== Biography ==
Desmaisons was the son of a physician. He studied at the Royal Collage of Chambéry. In 1828, he went to Saint Petersburg to study Oriental languages with Henry Wlangali, with the support of the Sardinian ambassador to Russia, the Count of Sale. He was enrolled at the University of Kazan, but remained in Saint Petersburg

In 1829, the Russian minister of public instruction sent him to Kazan University with the rank of bachelor of Oriental letters. He received a doctorate in Oriental literature the following year.

In 1831, Desmaisons was placed under the authority of the military governor of Orenburg. In April of that year he was appointed senior master of Oriental languages, professor of Persian and Arabic, at the Neplyuev Military Institute in Orenburg. On 4 September, he was also appointed assistant translator to the frontier commission of the city. In 1833, Major General Perovsky appointed him head of a secret commission charged with gathering commercial intelligence on Turkestan.

In 1834, he was sent to Bukhara at the head of a caravan of Tatar merchants, traveling under the name Mullah Mirza Dzhafar. He arrived in Bukhara on 29 December 1834 and returned to Orsk in July 1835. He then submitted detailed reports on the route followed, religious life, and the political and economic situation of the khanate, which the Russians intended to annex. For the success of this mission, Tsar Nicholas I awarded him the Order of St. Anna, and 3,000 rubles.

In 1836, Desmaisons was appointed professor in the Asiatic Department of the Ministry of Foreign Affairs of the Russian Empire. He took part in the Russian diplomatic mission to Tehran in 1840–1841. In December 1841, he was appointed second dragoman in the Asiatic Department. In 1843, after further missions in Persia, he was appointed director of training in Oriental languages in the Asiatic Department and became a Russian national.

He also served as an interpreter in the imperial chancellery for the translation of Tatar documents and worked on the compilation of a code of Muslim institutions. In 1843, King Charles Albert of Sardinia granted him royal letters authorizing him to serve Russia and to be naturalized there. In 1848, Charles Albert granted him the title of baron.

In 1846, Desmaisons participated in the foundation of the Imperial Russian Archaeological Society. He was appointed a state councilor of the fourth class in 1848. In 1850, he reached the highest diplomatic rank in the Asiatic Department, dragoman of the fifth class.

Desmaisons retired to Paris in 1857. There he undertook the edition and translation of the Ketab-e šajara-ye Torki by Abu al-Ghazi Bahadur, khan of the Khanate of Khiva from 1643 to 1663, based on a manuscript discovered by Vladimir Dal in Orenburg. The work was published by the Imperial Academy of Sciences of Saint Petersburg in two volumes under the title Histoire des Mogols et des Tatares between 1871 and 1874.

Desmaisons died at Aix-les-Bains in 1873, before he was able to publish his ''Dictionnaire persan-français'', which he had compiled during repeated visits to Persia between 1858 and 1869. The dictionary was published posthumously in four volumes by his nephews in Rome between 1908 and 1914.

== Publications ==
- Abu al-Ghazi Bahadur (1871–1874). Histoire des Mogols et des Tatares (in French). Vol. 1–2. Published, translated and annotated by Baron Desmaisons. Saint Petersburg: Imperial Academy of Sciences.
- Desmaisons, Jean Jacques Pierre (1908). Dictionnaire persan-français (in French and Persian). Vol. 1. Rome: Typographie polyglotte.
- Desmaisons, Jean Jacques Pierre (1910). Dictionnaire persan-français (in French and Persian). Vol. 2. Rome: Typographie polyglotte.
- Desmaisons, Jean Jacques Pierre (1913). Dictionnaire persan-français (in French and Persian). Vol. 3. Rome: Typographie polyglotte.
- Desmaisons, Jean Jacques Pierre (1914). Dictionnaire persan-français (in French and Persian). Vol. 4. Rome: Typographie polyglotte.
