= Naryn (Irtysh) =

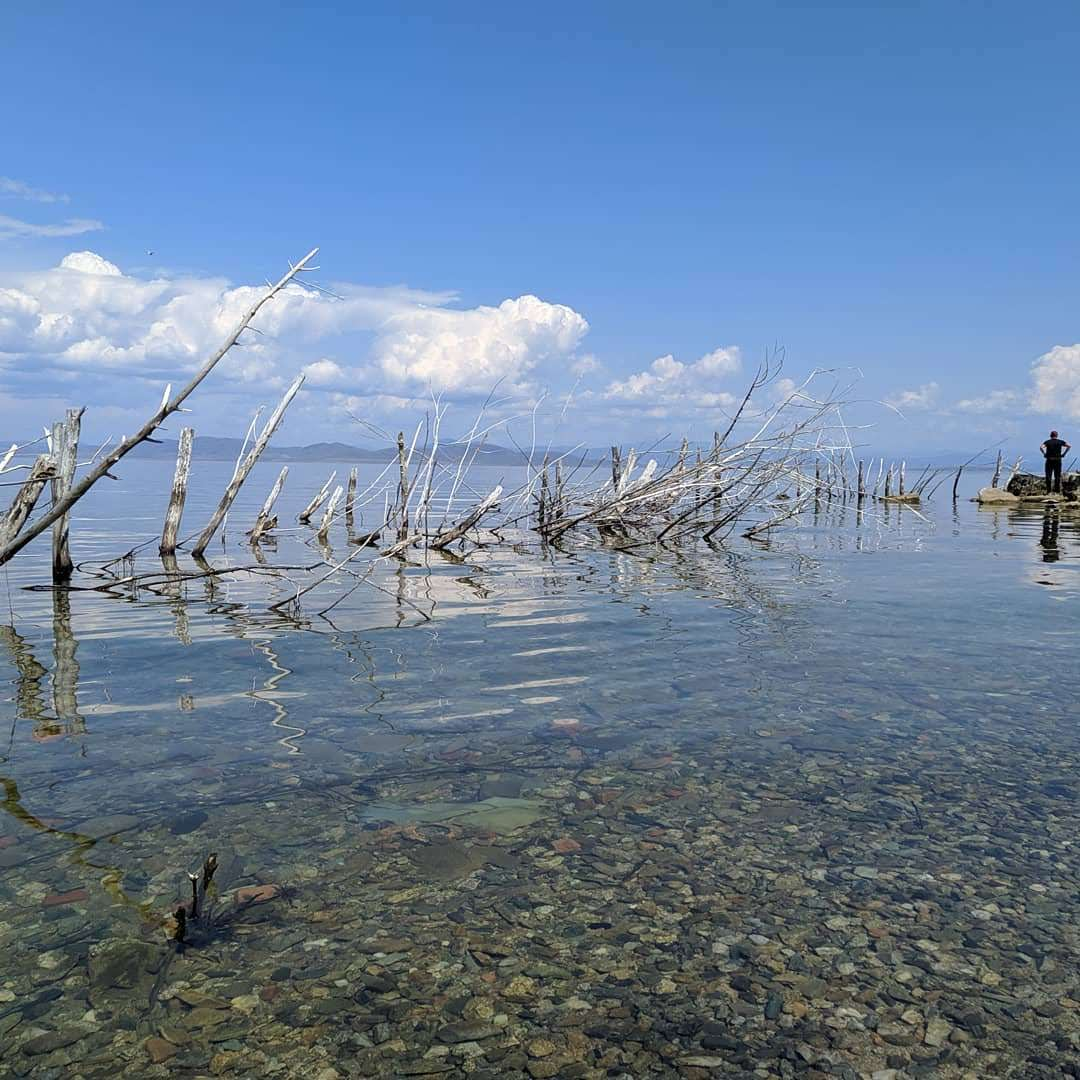

Location
- Country: Kazakhstan

Physical characteristics
- Mouth: Irtysh
  - location: Bukhtarma Reservoir
  - coordinates: 49°11′37″N 84°28′39″E
  - elevation: 388 m (1,273 ft)
- Length: 100 km (62 mi)

Basin features
- Progression: Irtysh→ Ob→ Kara Sea

The Naryn (Kazakh: Нарын, Russian: Нарым, Narym) is a river in Eastern Kazakhstan, a tributary of the Irtysh, originating at the junction of the ridges Narym and Sarymsakty of wetland formed by the mountain runoff streams. With its low headwaters and smooth clay-sandy bed, the width of the river valley at places extends to more than 20 kilometres (12 mi); in some places it narrows to 25 to 250 metres (82 to 820 ft). The width of the river is 15 to 25 metres (49 to 82 ft), and the depth varies from 0.5 to 2.5 metres (1.6 to 8.2 ft).

Before 1960, the Naryn flowed directly into the Irtysh River, and at the mouth of the river was a village, Ust-Narym. Since 1960, with the construction of Bukhtarma reservoir that flooded surrounding settlements, the Naryn empties into the Buhtarma Reservoir, and at the mouth of the river lies the village Ulken Naryn. Along the river are the towns Juldyz, Novoberezovka, and Maymyr.

According to the Chinese annals, the basin of the Naryn river was a home of an eastern Hun tribe Ala-at, Tr. for "skewbald horse", called in the Chinese annals "He-la" and "Boma" ("skewbald horse"); from the Alat tribe originated one of the Eastern Hun Shanuys called Helog Tou, i.e. Alat Tou, most likely named after his maternal tribe. Modern descendants of the ancient Alats are Alats in the Altai, and Khalaches and Khalajes in the northern India and eastern section of the Iranian plateau. Under Arabicized name Khalajes, Alats are known to constitute one of the major tribes of the 5th- to 6th-century CE Hephthalites.
