= Kurdification =

Adoption of Kurdish culture or language

Kurdification is a cultural change in which people, territory, or language gradually become Kurdish. Historically, Kurdification has happened naturally, as in Turkish Kurdistan, or as a deliberate government policy (as in Iraqi Kurdistan after 2003 invasion of Iraq).

The notion of Kurdification is different from country to country. In Turkish Kurdistan, many ethnic Armenians had Kurdified after converting to Islam, while many ethnic Bulgarians, Circassians, Chechens, Ingushs, and Ossetians were Kurdified as a result of fleeing to the region and having subsequently assimilated to the Kurdish culture and language.

== Turkey ==
=== Caucasian refugees (1860s–1910s) ===
When refugees from Caucasus reached the Ottoman Empire, Constantinople decided not to settle these in Kurdistan due to the extreme poverty and lack of material resources for the refugees. Yet after some time, the Ottomans started seeing the refugees as a chance to diminish the Kurdish claim to the region and allowed the refugees to settle in the region. In 1862, Circassian refugees from the Shapsug tribe arrived in the Kurdish areas of Ahlat and Adilcevaz and settled in the three Kurdish villages of Yoğurtyemez, Xanik (Çukurtarla), Develik and founded the village of Koxiş (Yolçatı).

The first big wave of Caucasian refugees to Kurdistan was in 1864 when 15,000 to 20,000 refugees settled in Sarıkamış, founding new villages and settling in abandoned Greek and Armenian villages. The largest group of refugees were Circassias who fled the Circassia region (part of the Russian Empire) during the ethnic cleansing of Circassians. Concurrently with the Circassian migration, Ossetians settled in the villages of Xulik (Otluyazı) and Ağcaviran (Akçaören) in Ahlat. According to the Russian intelligence officer Aleksandr Kolyubakin, no less than 1,500 Ossetians lived in the Sanjak of Muş in the late 1880s.

Chechens and Ingushes mostly settled in Varto area, in the villages of Arincik (Kıyıbaşı), Çarbuhur (Bağiçi), Tepeköy, Artet (Serinova), Ulusırt and Arinç (Çöğürlü).

From early stage on, these Caucasians went through a process of Kurdification and thereby had Kurdish as their mother tongue.

=== Urbanization of Kurds ===
With the departure of non-Muslim populations of many cities in regions with significant Kurdish population, the native urban Muslim populations also migrated to cities such as Gaziantep, İzmir, Adana, Ankara, and Istanbul. The tractorization in rural Kurdish communities during the 1950s and the later abandonment of villages due to the Kurdish–Turkish conflict caused many Kurds to migrate to nearby cities that were losing their native population such as Diyarbakır but also to distant cities like Mersin, either mostly or partially Kurdifying the ethnic makeup. The aim of the resettlements and depopulation of the Kurdish population from villages to the cities were the Turkification of the Kurdish population or according to İsmail Beşikçi the destruction of the Kurdish nation.

== Iraq ==
=== After 2011 ===
Some Assyrians in the Kurdistan Region of Iraq complained that construction plans are "aimed at affecting a demographic change that divides Assyrian blocs". Some Yazidis, Shabaks and Turkmens have reported that they are facing a policy of cultural and security control against them.

According to Sweden-based economist David Ghanim, the goal of some tactics of the KRG had been to push Shabak and Yazidi communities to identify as Kurds, which has been strongly denied by KRG authorities. He also claimed that the Kurdish authorities are working to impose Kurdish identity on the Yazidis and the Shabaks.

The Kurdish regional government has also been accused of trying to Kurdify other regions such as the Nineveh Plains and Kirkuk by providing financial support for Kurds who want to settle in those areas.

==== Kirkuk ====
While Kurdish forces held the city of Kirkuk, Kurdish authorities attempted to Kurdify the city. Turkmen and Arab residents in Kirkuk experienced intimidation, harassment and were forced to leave their homes, in order to increase the Kurdish demographic in Kirkuk and bolster their claims to the city. Multiple Human Rights Watch reports detail the confiscation of Turkmen and Arab families' documents, preventing them from voting, buying property and travelling. Turkmen residents of Kirkuk were detained by Kurdish forces and compelled to leave the city. Kurdish authorities expelled hundreds of Arab families from the city, demolishing their homes in the process.

United Nations reports since 2006 have documented that Kurdish authorities and Peshmerga militia forces were illegally policing Kirkuk and other disputed areas, and that these militia have abducted Turkmen and Arabs, subjecting them to torture.

== Iran ==
A number of Kurdicized ethnic groups exist within Iran, such as many Karapapakhs in West Azerbaijan, groups of Küresünni Turks in southwestern Khoy, and a group of Tilku Turks living around Santeh and Zagheh of Saqqez County.

== Syria ==
During the Syrian Civil War, the Syrian Democratic Forces have been accused of Kurdification. During 2016, Fabrice Balanche reported that the PYD was aiming to connect Kobane and Afrin cantons in the Manbij area between the Euphrates River and Afrin, where Kurds represent less than a quarter of the population, believing that various Kurdification methods could help subdue a large portion of the Turkmen and Arab population. Liz Sly of The Washington Post stated:

"The Kurds formally renamed Tal Abyad with a Kurdish name, "Gire Spi", and proclaim its new identity in signs throughout the town — written in the Latin script used by Turkish Kurds but not readily understood by Syrian Kurds or Arabs. They have also unilaterally detached it from the existing Syrian province of Raqqa and made it a part of their newly formed autonomous enclave, carved from areas traditionally inhabited by Kurds but steadily encroaching also on territories that were historically Arab."

— Liz Sly, "They freed a Syrian town from ISIS. Now they have to govern it.", The Washington Post

Likewise, YPG is accused of Kurdifying the names of the villages, especially the Arab villages in Raqqa. World Council of Arameans has also accused PYD of Kurdifying the region and terrorizing the Christians.

Many states, NGOs such as Human Rights Watch, and more than a dozen Syrian rebel groups accused the Syrian Democratic Forces of Kurdifying traditional Arab and Turkmen lands. In 2015, Amnesty International disclosed allegations of unjustified forced displacement, demolition of homes, and the seizure and destruction of property of Arabs and Turkmens (including the destruction of entire villages in some cases) found through field research.

In a report published by the United Nations' Independent International Commission of Inquiry on the Syrian Arab Republic on 10 March 2017, the Commission refuted Amnesty International's reports of ethnic cleansing, stating that "'though allegations of 'ethnic cleansing' continued to be received during the period under review, the Commission found no evidence to substantiate reports that YPG or SDF forces ever targeted Arab communities on the basis of ethnicity." In interviews, YPG spokespersons acknowledged that a number of families were in fact displaced. However, they placed the number at no more than 25 and claimed military necessity. They stated that the family members of terrorists maintained communications with them, and therefore had to be removed from areas where they might pose a danger. They further stated that IS was using civilians in those areas to plant car bombs or carry out other attacks on the YPG.

== See also ==
- Cultural assimilation
- Minorities in Iraq
- Kurdistan Regional Government
- Shabaks

== General references ==
- A. Bazzaz, turkmen.nl "The Kurdification procedure was soon implemented by the Kurdish leadership after toppling Saddam down in April 2003"
- Park, Bill, The Kurds and post-Saddam political arrangements in Iraq The Adelphi Papers (2005), Taylor & Francis: "The Kurds, who are intent on the further ‘Kurdification’ of Kirkuk before any census is held"
- Park, Bill, Iraqi scenarios, The Adelphi Papers, Volume 45, Number 374, May 2005, pp. 49–66
- PKK Iran - Strategic Comments, 2004 - informaworld.com "recent months Turkish intelligence has begun to report Turcoman frustration with Ankara’s failure to prevent the increasing ‘Kurdification’ of northern Iraq"
