= Begdili =

Oghuz-Turkmen tribe

Begdili بَكْتِلى
Begdili
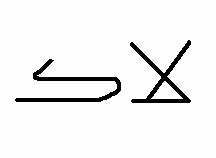
- Tamgha of Begdili

Regions with significant populations
- Turkmenistan, Azerbaijan, Turkey

Languages
- Azerbaijani, Turkmen, Turkish

Religion
- Islam

Related ethnic groups
- Oghuz Turks

Begdili (also spelled Bekdili or Bigdeli; Middle Turkic: بَكْتِلى Begtili; Turkmen: Begdili taýpasy; Turkish: Beğdili boyu; Azerbaijani: Bəydili boyu) were an Oghuz Turkic people and a sub-branch of the Bozok tribal federation. Currently, the descendants of Begdili tribe and those who identify themselves as such are part of the Geklen Turkmens living in the Balkan velayat of Turkmenistan. They also can be found among Ersari Turkmens, who live predominantly in the Lebap velayat (region) of Turkmenistan and northern provinces of Afghanistan. Turkish Begdili Turkomans live in Tarsus, Aleppo, and in many parts of Anatolia. Cerit/Ceritli Turkomans are a branch of Begdili tribe.

== Origin ==
In his history work Shajara-i Tarākima (Genealogy of Turkmens), the Khan of the Khanate of Khiva and historian Abu al-Ghazi Bahadur mentions Begdili among 24 Oghuz tribes, direct descendants of Oghuz-khan, who was the ancient progenitor of the Oghuz people, and the name of the tribe translates as “reputable”.

== Affiliation ==
The Anushtegin dynasty, which ruled vast parts of Central Asia from 1077 to 1231 under the title of Khwarazmshahs, descended from the Begdili tribe. The Mamluk Sultan of Egypt - Saif ad-Din Qutuz, who ruled Egypt from 1259 to 1260, also widely believed to have come from the Begdili tribe.

Begdili tribe played important role on Seljuk expansion over Iran and Anatolia. They also participated on foundation and administration of Aq Qoyunlus and Safavids.

In the Middle Ages, a large group of Begdili Turkmens migrated from Central Asia to the territory of modern Iran, Azerbaijan and Turkey. In Azerbaijan and Turkey, there are still some toponyms that are called Begdili.

== Sources ==
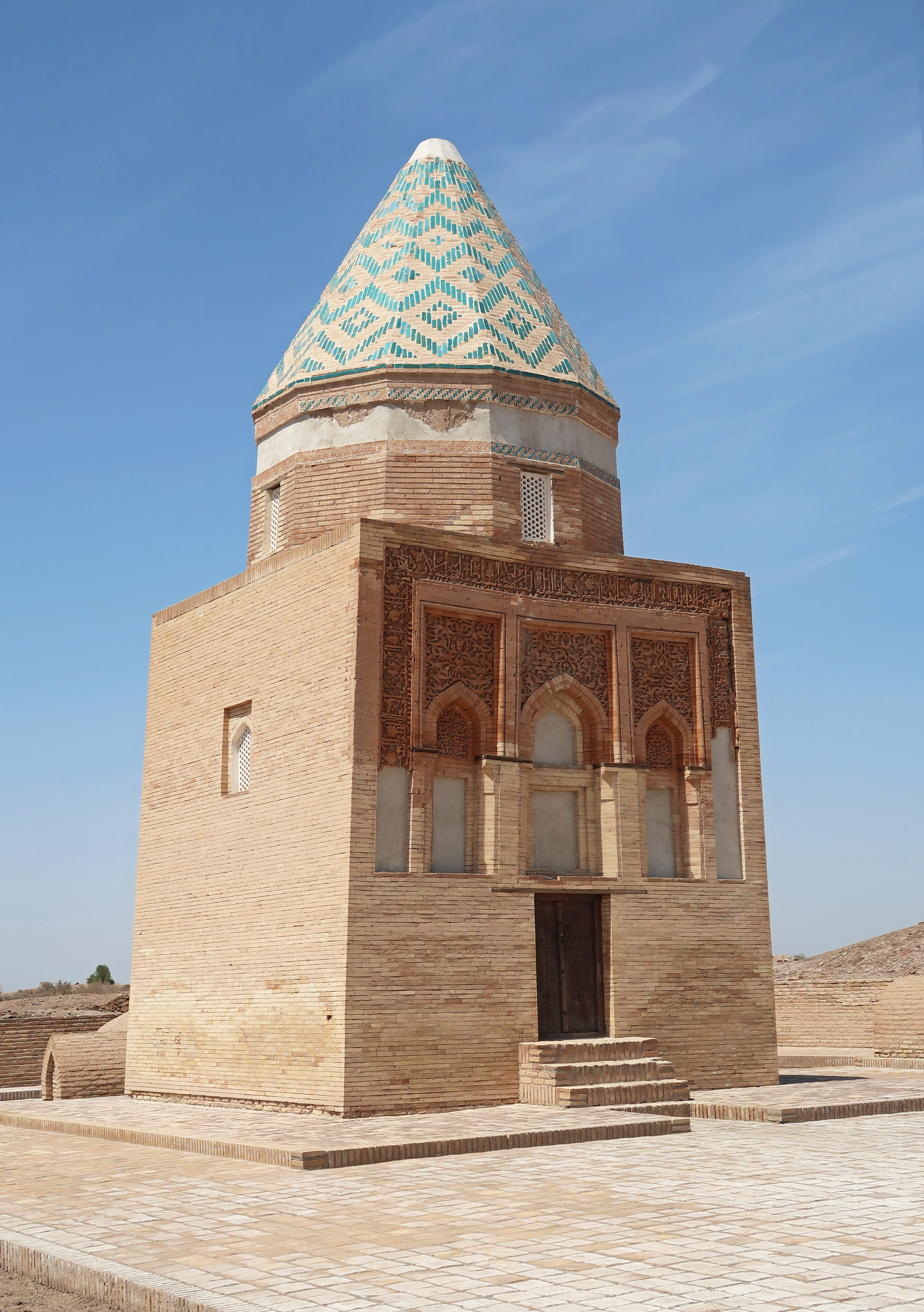
Mausoleum of Khwarazm Shah Il-Arslan in Turkmenistan

Information about the origin of the Begdili mostly comes from the famous statesman and historian of the Ilkhanate, Rashid-al-Din Hamadani in his "Jami' al-tawarikh" (Compendium of Chronicles), and from the work of the Khan of Khiva Abu al-Ghazi Bahadur, titled "Genealogy of Turkmens".

== See also ==
- Oghuz Turks
- Khwarazmian dynasty
- Il-Arslan
- Shajara-i Tarākima
- Turkmen tribes
- Abu al-Ghazi Bahadur
- Jami' al-tawarikh
