= Olot District =

Coordinates: 39°24′54″N 63°48′12″E

- District
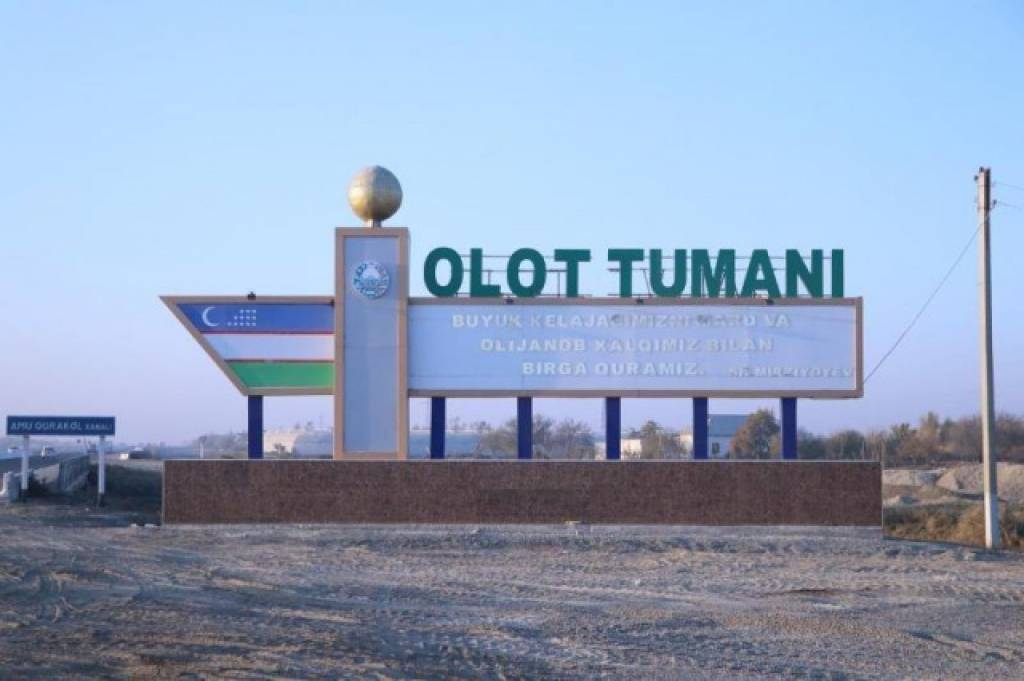
- Seal

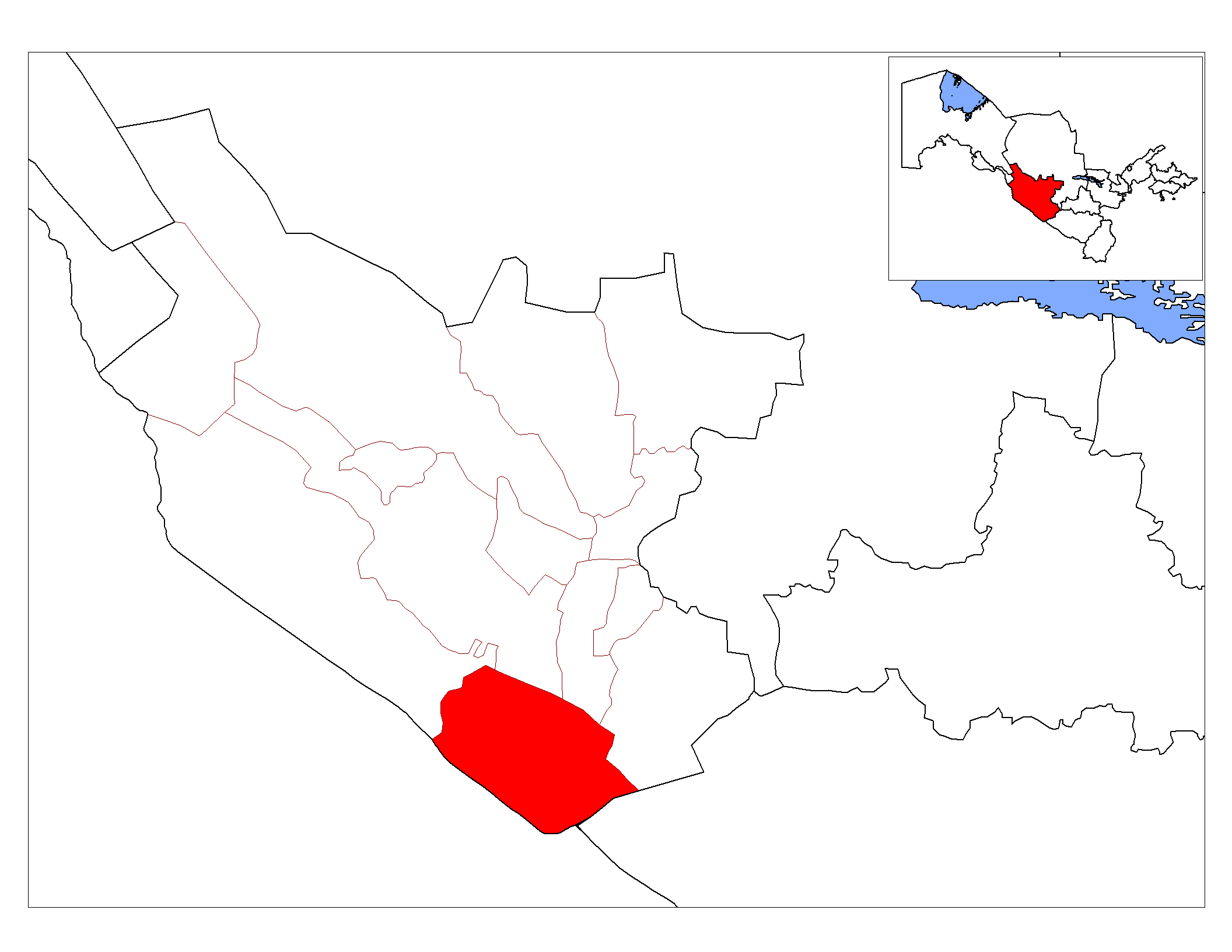
- Country: Uzbekistan
- Region: Bukhara Region
- Capital: Olot

Area
  - Total: 3,230 km^{2} (1,250 sq mi)

Population (2021)
  - Total: 101,300
  - Density: 31.4/km^{2} (81.2/sq mi)
- Time zone: UTC+5 (UZT)

Olot District (Uzbek: Olot tumani) is a district of Bukhara Region in Uzbekistan. The capital lies at the city Olot. It has an area of 3,230 km^{2} (1,250 sq mi) and its population is 101,300 (2021).

The district consists of 1 city (Olot), 8 urban-type settlements (Ganchi Chandir, Kesakli, Qirtay, Sola qorovul, Jayxunobod, Oʻzbekiston, Chovdur, Boʻribek Chandir) and 10 rural communities.

The etymology of the name comes from the Turkic tribe Alat or Ala-at, also known in Arabic and Persian as Khalaj, and in Chinese as Boma, Hela, and Heloγ, all with a meaning "piebald horse". During the Middle Age, Alats played a prominent role in the history of southern Uzbekistan, Khorasan (Kalat), Persia and Afghanistan (Khalaj).
