= Novoberezovka =

Rural locality in Altai Krai, Russia

Novoberezovka Новоберёзовка
- Selo
- Location within Altai Krai Location within Russia
- Coordinates: 53°44′N 84°18′E
- Country: Russia
- Region: Altai Krai
- District: Pervomaysky District
- Time zone: UTC+7:00

Novoberezovka (Russian: Новоберёзовка) is a rural locality (a selo) and the administrative center of Novoberezovsky Selsoviet, Pervomaysky District, Altai Krai, Russia. The population was 421 as of 2013. There are 4 streets.

== Geography ==
Novoberezovka is located 70 km northeast of Novoaltaysk (the district's administrative centre) by road. Malaya Povalikha is the nearest rural locality.
