= Olot, Uzbekistan =

Olot
- City
- Location in Uzbekistan
- Coordinates: 39°25′N 63°48′E
- Country: Uzbekistan
- Region: Bukhara Region
- District: Olot District
- Town status: 1982

Population (2016)
  - Total: 13,200
- Time zone: UTC+5 (UZT)

Olot (Uzbek: Olot, Russian: Алат, romanized: Alat) is a city and seat of Olot District in Bukhara Region in Uzbekistan. Its population was 8,857 in 1989, and 13,200 in 2016.

The etymology of the name comes from the Turkic tribe Alat or Ala-at, also known in Arabic and Persian as Khalaj, and in Chinese as Boma, Hela, and Heloγ, all with a meaning "piebald horse". During the Middle Age, Alats played a prominent role in the history of southern Uzbekistan, Khorasan (Kalat), Persia and Afghanistan (Khalaj).
