= Anusha Khan =

Muhammad Anusha Khan (1643-late 17th century 80s) was the Khan of Khwarazm in 1663–1686. He was the only son of Abulgazi Muhammad Bahodir Khan. During his reign, Anusha Khan launched several attacks on the Bukhara Khanate and even once captured the city of Bukhara and preached a khutbah in his own name.

== Biography ==
Anusha Sultan participated in his father's military campaigns from his adolescence. For example, in approximately 1657, during the invasion of Karmina by Abul-Gazi Khan, Anusha Khan was 14 years old. In that war, Abul-Gazi Khan's army, which was surrounded, broke through the thousands of troops of Abdulaziz Khan, and scattered the Bukhara army.

== Family ==
Anusha khan had consort, Tokhta xanum turkmen. She was killed 1694/5.

Anusha Khan had 2 sons:

- Khudaydad Khan
- Arang Khan with Tokhta xanum turkmen
