= Yazır =

Yazır were a past tribe of Oghuz Turks. Today, the name refers to:

- Yazır, Acıpayam, Turkey
- Yazır, Ağlasun, Turkey
- Yazır, Boğazkale, Turkey
- Yazır, Çal, Turkey
- Yazır, Çavdır, Turkey
- Yazır, Çubuk, a village in the district of Çubuk, Ankara Province, Turkey
- Yazır, Finike, a village in the district of Finike, Antalya Province, Turkey
- Yazır, Karacasu, a village in the district of Karacasu, Aydın Province, Turkey
- Yazır, Kocasinan, Turkey
- Yazır, Korkuteli, a village in the district of Korkuteli, Antalya Province, Turkey
- Yazır, Kumluca, a village in the district of Kumluca, Antalya Province, Turkey
- Yazır, Selçuklu, a neighbourhood in the district of Selçuklu, Konya Province, Turkey
- Garadashly (Yazır), Balkan, Ahal, Dashoguz provinces of Turkmenistan
