= Küresünni =

Turkic ethnic subgroup

Regions with significant populations
- West Azerbaijan province

Languages
- Azerbaijani, Turkish, Kurdish

Religion
- Sunni Islam (Shafi'i)

Related ethnic groups
- Azerbaijanis, Turks

Küresünni is a Turkic tribe that inhabits the territory of Salmas, Urmia, Khoy, Maku in Iran and Van Province in Turkey. It is believed that they descend from Chepni tribesmen who were settled in the region by the Ottoman Empire to serve against the Qizilbash. Küresünni continue to be fervent Sunnis, primarily following the Hanafi and Shafi'i schools of jurisprudence depending on their geographic region. In the southwest of Khoy, there are Kurdicized groups of Küresünni Turks.

== Etymology ==
The origin of the ethnonym Küresünni is explained through various geographic and historical theories. The predominant view among the local population is that the community descends from Çepni Turks who migrated from the Black Sea coastal province of Giresun, with the name deriving from Giresunlu or Kiresunlu ("people from Giresun"). Conversely, another theory suggests they are a branch of the Afshar tribe from the Urmia region, and the name originally derives from a tribal leader named Kör Hasan (evolving from Kör Hasanlı). Other explanations include folk etymologies claiming the name originates from terms such as Kara-Sünni or Kore-Sünnî (meaning "blinded Sunni"), or from the term Khorasani.

== History ==
Basil Nikitin, who referred to them as "Kuresinli", described them as a recently Kurdicized Turkic tribe. When Charles Stuart visited them in October 1835, they were still considered Turks. Pierre Oberling wrote that the tribe was Sunni and spoke Kurdish. He also described them as Kurdicized Turks.

The Kuresunni were later sedentary and comprised two branches. One branch lived in the district of Kuresunni, southwest of Khoy, and comprised some 250 households in the 1920s and occupied 15 to 20 villages according to the Iran Azerbaycan Tetkik Raporu. According to Iranshahr, it comprised around 400 households in 1963. The other branch lived in the district of Dol, southeast of Urmia, and occupied nine villages in 1960. The village of Silab traditionally served as the capital of the Kuresunni of Khoy.

The Iran Azerbaycan Tetkik Raporu quoted an unidentified source claiming that the Korasonni of Khoy came from the Caucasus, while those of Urmiya originated in Van and Şemdinli, and also claimed that the name Kuresunni derived from a blind leader who went by the name of "Kör Hasan". Oberling added that the etymollgy was far-fetched, and considered other theories equally implausible, such as those claiming that the name came from the Turkish city of Giresun, or that the name was a corruption of "Khorasani".

In the early 1920s, the Kuresunni joined a major Kurdish rebellion against the Iranian government. There was a wider pattern of Sunni Turks in Iranian Azerbaijan integrating into Kurdish culture following their exclusion from Turkish society.

== Bibliography ==
- Oberling, Pierre (2005). "Kora-Sonni". Encyclopaedia Iranica.
- Oberling, Pierre (2004). "Kurdish tribes". Encyclopaedia Iranica.
