= Al-Shajara =

Al-Shajara (Arabic: الشجرة; also transliterated as ash-Shajara, ash-Shajarah, el-Shagara, or esh-Shagara) an Arabic word meaning 'the tree'. It can also refer to the following places in the Middle East:

- Al-Shajara, Jordan, a village in northern Jordan
- Al-Shajara, Palestine, a depopulated Palestinian village near Tiberias
- Al-Shajara, Syria, a town in southern Syria
- Al-Shajara, Khartoum, a neighborhood in Sudan's capital Khartoum
