= Döğer (tribe) =

Oghuz tribe

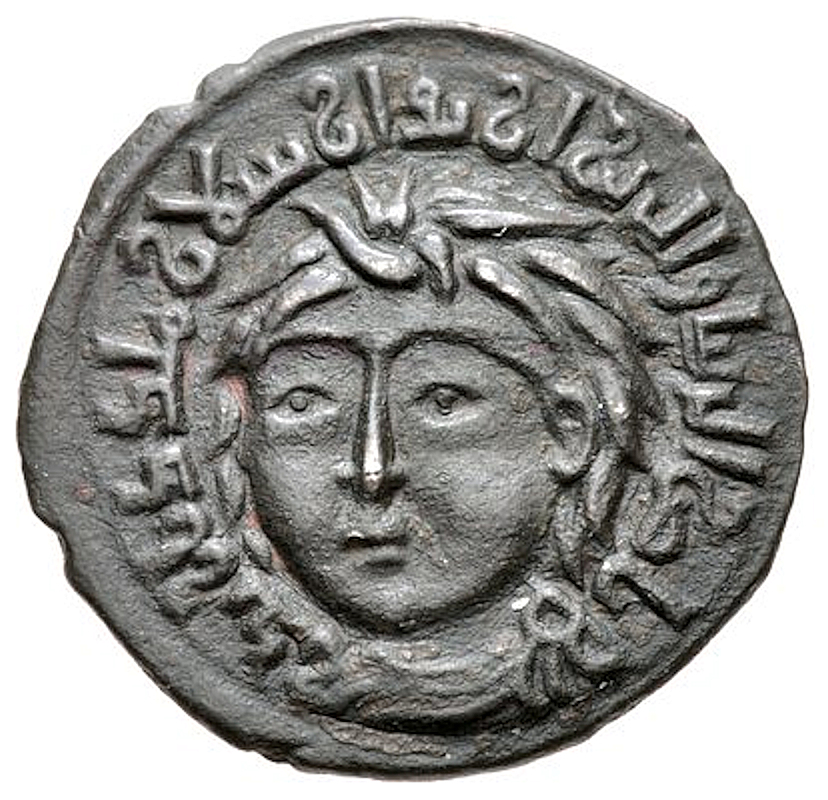
Portrait of Nasir al-Din Artuq Arslan, an Oghuz Döğer ruler of the Artuqid dynasty, Mardin, dated AH 611 (1214-5 CE)

Tüger, Döğer, Dogar or Deogers (Azerbaijani: Dögərlər, Turkish: Döğer boyu, Turkmen: Tüwer taýpasy) was one of the 24 Oghuz tribes from the Bozok wing, the tribe of Ay Khan. According to Mahmud Kashgari, it was the eighteenth biggest tribe among the Oghuz tribes. The Turkoman dynasty of Artuqids, which ruled the Beylik of same name, originated from the tribe of Döger.

== History ==
Damğa of the Döğer tribe.

In the pre-Islamic era, Dogers occupied an important place. Also, they played a significant role as warriors in the Seljuk army during the latter's conquest of Iran and Anatolia. The dynasty of Turkoman origin, the Artukids, derived from the Doger tribe as well.

Dogers had tremendous influence among the Turkomans for centuries and were considered a noble tribe. They lived under the leadership of Salim Beg Doger in the territory of the present-day Syria, and their beylik (principality) was constantly attacked by the Kara Koyunlu and Mamluks.

The Doger tribe, who mostly lived in Northwestern Syria and was associated with both Kara Koyunlu and Ak Koyunlu Turkomans, never joined any of the confederations. At the beginning of the 15th century, Dogers were among the most important Turkoman allies of the Mamluk army on the northern border; and in the rivalry between Kara Usman and Kara Yusuf, they appeared first on one side, then on the other. However, by 1415 they had lost control over many of their former centers at Diyar Mudar, over the Arab tribes of Syria, and over Ak Koyunlu in Diyarbakir. After the death of Kara Usman in 1435, the Mamluk sultan Al-Ashraf Barsbay ordered the Dogers to attack Ak-Koyunlu near Amid; their victory over the Turkoman Confederation, however, marked their last emergence as a real political force in the region.

During the Ottoman conquest, Syria was again inhabited by the Dogers who had their aimaks there. Their aimaks dwelled mostly in Aleppo, Dimashq, Urfa, Boz Ulus, Kirkuk and Kozan. At the beginning of the 15th century, they also migrated from Northern Syria to Azerbaijan together with Kara Koyunlu. During the Safavid era, they were part of the Turkoman tribal confederation. Their aimak is also mentioned in the 18th century among the aimaks associated with the Otuz iki tribal union. That aimak wintered in the Arasbasar region of Ganja, in the village of Huseyinli.
