= Chepni (tribe) =

Oghuz Turkic tribe

- Tamgha of Chepni according Mahmud al-Kashgari

Regions with significant populations
- Iran (West Azerbaijan Province), Turkey (Black Sea Region)

Languages
- Turkish (in Turkey); Azerbaijani, Persian, Kurdish (in Iran)

Religion
- Sunni Islam, Shia Islam, Alevism

Related ethnic groups
- Oghuz Turks

Chepni (Azerbaijani: Çəpni; Turkish: Çepni; Turkmen: Çepni) is one of the 24 Oghuz Turkic tribes.

== History ==
In the legend of Oghuz Qaghan, the Chepni was stated as one of the clans of the tribe of Gök Han that consists of Pecheneg (Beçenek), Bayandur (Bayındır), Chowdur (Çavuldur) and Chepni, a part of Üç-Oklar branch of the Oghuz Turks. According to Mahmud al-Kashgari's Dīwān Lughāt al-Turk, it was the 21st tribe of the 22 Oghuz tribes.

They had been converted to Islam (Sunni, Shia and Alevi). According to a Turkish historian, Faruk Sümer, the first murids of Haji Bektash Veli may have been the Chepni residents of Suluca Kara Üyük (now a town of Nevşehir Province in the Central Anatolia region of Turkey) and some Turkish historians claim that Haji Bektash Veli may be of Chepni origin.

== Language ==
In the 1330s, some Turkmens appeared in the coastal regions of the Pontus. A remarkable feature of the Pontic situation is that some groups of nomads apparently wandered Trapezuntine territories as subjects of the Grand Komnenoi. In addition to the case of the Christian Çepni, this is substantiated by linguistic data. According to Brendemoen, by the 14th century, a group of Pontic Chepni nomads was bilingual and spoke both Turkic and Greek. Moreover, the earliest Turkic dialect of the Pontos was based on the Aq Qoyunlu Turkic dialect under the influence of Pontic Greek. Historian Michael Meeker states that the linguistic Hellenization of some Turks who settled in the region is not "altogether improbable".

== Settlements ==
=== Turkey ===
Giresun province and its region is known as Chepni province in history. Chepni are mainly concentrated in the provinces of Giresun and Ordu in the Eastern Black Sea Region but also live in Gaziantep, Trabzon, and Balıkesir.

=== Turkmenistan ===
In Turkmenistan, Chepni is a clan among Geklen Turkmens living in the west of the country.

== See also ==
- Küresünni
- Chepni of Rumkale
