= Qarapapaq =

Municipality in Qazax District, Azerbaijan

- Municipality
- Location within Azerbaijan
- Coordinates: 41°05′N 45°23′E
- Country: Azerbaijan
- District: Qazax

Population
  - Total: 1,750
- Time zone: UTC+04:00 (AZT)
  - Summer (DST): UTC+05:00 (AZT)

Qarapapaq (also, Karapapakh) is a village and municipality in Qazax District, Azerbaijan. It has a population of 1,750. Similarly to the name, the village is populated by Karapapakhs.
