= Alat tribe =

Oghuz Turkic tribe

The Alat (a.k.a. Ala-at, Ala, Alachin, Alagchin, Alchin, Alchi, Alayontli, Ulayundluğ (اُوﻻيُنْدْلُغْ) ("piebald horse", pinto); Boma (駁馬 or 駮馬 "piebald horse"), Helai (賀賴), Helan (賀蘭), Hela (曷剌), Bila (弊剌), (Note: Tongdian identifies the Bila (弊剌) with Basmyls (拔悉彌) instead) or dru-gu ha-la-yun-log ("Ha la yun log Turks")) were one salient Turkic tribe known from Chinese annals.

Alats were possibly identical to the Luandi, or Xueyantuo, or Khalajes, the last group being a Turkic Central Asian people known to medieval Arab and Persian Muslim geographers and in Bactrian inscriptions.

Literature on Alats is very rich; Alats were a subject of study by Tangshu, Jiu Tangshu, Tang Huiyao, N.Ya. Bichurin, S.E. Malov, N.A. Aristov, Grigory Grum-Grshimailo, Yu. Nemeth, G. Howorth, P. Pelliot, L. Hambis, and others.

== Name ==
In ancient Turkic lexicon, the meaning of "skewbald" (horse) is expressed with the terms "ala" or "alagchin" still active now in composite expressions. Tang Huiyao mentioned, right after the Ashina tribe, a tribe named Geluozhi[ya] (葛羅枝[牙]) (Middle Chinese ZS: *kɑt̚-lɑ-t͡ɕiᴇ[-ŋˠa]), whose tamga is depicted as. Zuev took this as a variant of 遏羅支 Eluozhi (supposedly from MC *a-la-tsie) and asserted that this is the earliest transmission and certainly ascends to Alagchin (Alachin, Alchin, Alchi). During the Tang period, Chinese chroniclers calqued the ethonym Alat as Boma "skewbald horses". Elsewhere, Zuev stated that "Sometimes the tribal name 曷剌 Hela (< ɣа-lât < *alat < *ala-at "skewbald horse") is written down with hieroglyphs 賀賴 Helai (ɣâ-lâi < alai), which is equivalent to 賀蘭 Helan (< alan ~ ala "skewbald, motley, mixed"). Since Oghuz (Turkmen) tribe of Alayontli has the same tamga as Boma (Alat) tribe and whose name also translates as "skewbald horse", Zuev is certain that Alayontli is the same tribe as alat.

Chinese historiographers also preserved many similar titles, individual and tribal names in Xianbei society, where horses were held in high esteem:

1. tribal name Helan (賀蘭);
2. individual names: such as Xiongnu Chanyu Helaitou (賀賴頭); Tuyuhun prince Helutou (賀虜頭); Tiefu Xiongnu chief Liuhu's second son Eloutou (閼陋頭); Northern Wei general Gao Huan's Xianbei name Heliuhun (賀六渾), Aliutou (阿六頭), Heliutou (賀六頭);
3. the title Helazhen 賀剌真 (recorded in Nanqishu) of bodyguards (三郎 sānlāng) serving Northern Wei emperors in the 5th century.

According to Peter A. Boodberg the title Helazhen transcribes "undoubtedly *atlačin 'horseman' from Tk. atla 'to mount a horse'", thus "a purely Turkish form in T'o-pa". All of those foresaid names & titles are traceable back to Turkic or Turco-Mongol *atlan "to ride" < *at- "horse", whereas *ala- *alaɣ-, or *alutu means "variegated", "dappled", or "piebald", thus describing the preferred coat-color(s) of nomadic northerners' warhorses.

The ethnonym Alat might have been transcribed as Khalaj or Qalaj in Persian, Arabic and Bactrian sources, corresponding to 訶(達)羅支 He(da)luozhi (< *ha-(dat-)la-tɕĭe) or 葛(達)羅支 Ge(da)luozhi (< *kat-(dat-)la-tɕĭe), which in turn are variants of 葛羅支 Geluozhi. According to the New Book of Tang (vol. 217), Boma 駁馬 ~ Bila 弊剌 ~Eluozhi 遏羅支 neighboured the Jiegu 結骨 (i.e. Yenisei Kyrgyz). Arab geographer al-Idrisi recorded that the Khalajes' winter quarter and castle were situated near the Kimeks, who in turn dwelt in the Irtysh basin, to the north and/or west of the Kirghizes. Thus, based on geographic arrangements, the Boma ~ Bila ~ Eluozhi (i.e. Alats) might be the same as Khalajes.

Tongdian glossed Helan as simply "horse" in Old Turkic and Yuanhe Maps and Records of Prefectures and Counties glossed Helan as "piebald horse",

== Physical Appearance ==
The New Book of Tang described the facial appearance of Alats, as resembling Kyrgyz's. 9th-century author Duan Chengshi described the Kyrgyz's as "yellow-haired, green-eyed, red-mustached [and red-]bearded". The New Book of Tang also described the Kyrgyz's as "all tall, red-haired, pale-faced, green-irised"; Kyrgyz's regarded black hair negatively and insisted that black-eyed individuals were descendants of the Han general Li Ling.

== History ==
=== Southern Xiongnu in China ===
Fang Xuanling, in Jinshu, (Ch. 110) states that around 349 to 370 CE the Xiongnu leader, titled Chanyu, Helaitou brought his tribe of 35 thousand to the Xianbei Former Yan state and submitted to its emperor Murong Jun. Helaitou was bestowed the title of General Pacifying the West, and settled in the Daizong district. The Helan was listed as the 14th of 19 tribes of the Southern Xiongnu.

According to the Chinese annals, the home of the Alat was either the Alashan Mountains or the basin of the Narym River.

=== Alat as a component tribe ===
Alats integrated themselves into the Xianbei confederation. The Tuoba-Xianbei that founded Northern Wei dynasty's Eight Great Noble Clans were Buliugu, Helan, Dugu, Helou, Huniu, Qiumu, Gexi, and Yuchi. From the 3rd century, the Helan also offered marriage alliances with the imperial Tuoba clan.

Al-Khwarizmi asserted that Khalajes were one of the two remnant tribes of the Hephthalites. Even so, modern Khalaj have no idea about their origins, and Sims-Williams cited Bactrian documents dated from 678 and 710 and named a Khalaj people, thus these new archaeological documents do not support the suggestion that Khalajes were the Hephthalites' successors. According to Minorsky, Khalajes were "perhaps only politically associated with the Hephthalites."

=== Middle Ages ===
Jiu Tangshu & Tongdian mentioned a tribe of Boma (skewbald horses), besides the Basmyls, Kyrghyzes, Khwarazmians etc., who in 638, submitted to the Western Turkic Duolu Qaghan. Tongdian cites as a comment a fragment from an unknown composition that "Tujue call the skewbald horses Hela, and the state is also called Hela".

"They are north from the Tujue, 14,000 li from the Chinese capital. They follow grass and water, but mostly live in the mountains. Their standing army is 30,000 men. There is always snow, and foliage does not fall down. They plough fields with horses. All horses are skewbald colors, therefore the state is also given the same name. They live in the north near a sea. Though they have horses, they do not ride them, but use their milk for food. They are frequently at war with Kirgizes".

Jin Tangshu also noted that the Alats and Kyrgyz spoke mutually unintelligible languages.

From the story of Abulgazi and description of two Mongolian embassies (in 1233 and 1254) to Alachins, they lived along the Yenisei, the sources of the Angara, and the east coast of Lake Baikal (called the "Northern sea" by Chinese chroniclers). Based on annalistic traditions, the author of the "Family tree of Türks" Abulgazi described the country of skewbald horses:

"A multitude of Tatar tribes coached along the banks of the Angara-muren, which runs east of the Kirgiz country and runs into the sea. On the seacoast at the estuary of this river is a large city surrounded by settlements where live nomadic tribes in large numbers. Their horses are large... All of them are skewbald in hue, there are no others. Near that city called Alakchin was a silver spring, therefore all caldrons, dishes, and vases were from silver. It is that country that the Uzbeks mean when say: "there is a country where all horses are skewbald, and the stoves are from gold".

The Khalaj tribe had long been settled in Afghanistan. A Khalji dynasty of Turkic Khalaj origin ruled large parts of South Asia from 1290 to 1320, they were the second Muslim dynasty to rule the Delhi Sultanate of India, they are noted in history for repeatedly defeating the warring Mongols and thereby saving India from plundering raids and attacks.

=== Modern time ===
After the Russian revolution in 1917, Alats headed a movement of Turkestan peoples for independence, and created a functioning state of the Kazakh people known as Alash Autonomy that operated between December 13, 1917, and August 26, 1920, controlling roughly the territory of the present-day Republic of Kazakhstan, with a capital in Alash-qala (modern Semey). The Alash leaders proclaimed the establishment of the Alash Orda, a Kazakh government, aligned with the Russian White Army in December 1917 and fought against the Bolsheviks.

In 1919, when the White forces were losing, the Alash Autonomous government began negotiations with the Bolsheviks. In 1919–20 Bolsheviks defeated the White Russian forces in the region and occupied Kazakhstan. On August 26, 1920, the new Soviet government disbanded the Alash Autonomy, and established the "Kyrgyz Autonomous Soviet Socialist Republic". However, the movement for independence continued until 1925, when the war for independence was finally extinguished

== Modern demographics ==
The Alats' descendants now live in China, Russia in the Altai, Kazakhstan, Uzbekistan, Kyrgyzstan, Turkey, the Caucasus, eastern section of the Iranian plateau; as well as possibly Turkmenistan, India, and Afghanistan, if Alats were indeed the Khalajes known in Bactrian inscriptions and to medieval Arab and Persians geographers.

Alat tribe members who migrated to China changed their surname to Hè (trad. 賀; simp. 贺) and would eventually become assimilated into the Han Chinese.

Alats are also the main ethnic component in the Kazakh Junior-Kishi Zhuz and constitute parts of Uzbeks. Further west, Alats constitute one Oghuz Turkish tribe, Alayuntlu in Turkish and Alayuntluq in Azeri, which means "with spotted horses". Alanyuntlu's descendants live in Central Turkey. Alayundluq participated in the ethnogenesis of Azeris, as Alayuntluq tamgas have been found in historical residences of Azeris in Georgia, Armenia, and the modern Republic of Azerbaijan. In 1625, during the war between Eshim Khan and Tursun Khan, the Alats joined the kyrgyz Saruu tribe under the name "Alakchyn".
