= Abu al-Ghazi Bahadur =

Khan of Khiva from 1643 to 1663

Khan of Khiva
- Reign: 1643–1663
- Predecessor: Isfandiyar Khan
- Successor: Anusha Khan
- Born: August 24, 1603; Old Urgench, Khanate of Khiva
- Died: 1663 (aged 59–60); Khiva
- Issue: Anusha Khan
- House: Borjigin
- Dynasty: Arabshahid-Shaybanid
- Father: 'Arab Muhammad Khan
- Mother: Mehribonuhonim
- Religion: Sunni Islam

Abu al-Ghazi Bahadur (Chagatai and Persian: ابوالغازی بهادرخان, Abulgazi, Ebulgazi, Abu-l-Ghazi, August 24, 1603 – 1663) was the Khan of Khiva from 1643 to 1663. He was a member of the Uzbek Shaybanid dynasty. He spent ten years in Persia before becoming khan, and was very well educated, writing two historical works in the Khiva dialect of the Chagatai language. He was a descendant of Genghis Khan through Arab Shah.

== Life ==
Abulghazi was born in Urgench, Khanate of Khiva, the second son of the ruler, 'Arab Muhammad Khan. Since he was born 40 days after his father defeated a raid by Ural Cossacks, he was named "Abul-Ghazi" (father of Warrior). He lived in Urgench for 16 years until he was appointed as governor of Kat by his father. Towards the end of his father's reign, a civil war broke out against him led by his brothers, Habash-sultan and Ilbars-sultan. Abulghazi had to flee to Samarqand and take refuge at the court of Imam Quli Khan of Bukhara where he lived for two years. His younger brother Afghan Muhammad fled to Russia where he lived in the Qasim Khanate. His other brother Isfandiyar Khan finally prevailed and became khan in 1623. He offered Abulghazi the governorship of Urgench, his birthplace.

=== Life in exile ===
After ruling as the governor of Urgench for three years, Abulghazi rebelled when his brother was visiting Hazorasp, but was defeated and fled to Esim Khan, ruler of the Qazaq Khanate, in 1626. After staying with him for three months, Abulghazi defected to Tursun Muhammad Khan, a rival of Esim Khan in Tashkent. After living in Tashkent for two years, Abulghazi went to Imam Quli from where he tried to capture Khiva in 1629. However, Isfandiyar captured him and Abulghazi was expelled to Abiward, whose Safavid governor sent him to Safi I's court in Isfahan. Abulghazi lived there as an exile from 1629 until 1639 studying Persian and Arabic history. He eventually escaped from the Safavid court to Balkan and lived among the Teke tribe for a while. In 1641 Abulghazi went to the Kalmyk Khanate where he tried to enlist Kho Orluk's help.

== Reign ==
Abulghazi finally acceded to the Khivan throne in 1643 after his brother's death. But his position was only secure around Urgench as most of Khiva was conquered by the Bukhara Khanate. Abulghazi only managed to secure his position in 1645 when Nadir Muhammad Khan of Bukhara died.

Abulghazi's early years on the Khivan throne were spent fighting rebellious Turkmen tribes after his summary execution of 2000 Turkmen elders in Hazorasp in 1646. He managed to subdue most of the Karakum and Mangyshlak tribes by 1653. He also repelled raids by Kalmyks in 1649, 1653 and 1656. Towards the end of his reign he started a major campaign against Bukhara which lasted well into his successor's reign. He left the throne to his son Anusha Khan and died in Khiva in 1663.

== Works ==
Abu al-Ghazi is known as the author of two historical works: "Genealogy of the Turkmen" Shajara-i Tarākima finished in 1659 and "Genealogy of the Turks" Shajara-i Turk finished in 1665. These are important sources for modern knowledge of Central Asian history.

=== Shajara-i Turk ===
The Shajara-i Turk was Abu al-Ghazi's opus magnum. Its title has been variously translated as the "Genealogy of the Turks" and the "Genealogy of the Tatars", "shajara" being Arabic for "genealogy". Because using the word "Tatar" for "Turks" was a widely used misnomer, it is now obsolete to call the work "Shajara-i Turk" as "Genealogy of the Tatars" instead of "Genealogy of the Turks" since it is a work on the Turks. According to Abu al-Ghazi, in Shajara-i Turk he used the work of Rashid-al-Din Hamadani, Sharaf ad-Din Ali Yazdi, and other writers, totalling 18 historical sources, and corrected them in accordance with Turkic oral traditions which he was taught in his youth.

A manuscript of the Shajara-i Turk was purchased in Tobolsk from a Bukhara merchant by Swedish officers detained in Russian captivity in Siberia. Using the local literate Tatars, the Swedish officers first translated the book into Russian, and then they re-translated it into various other languages. The French translation of the Shajara-i Turk was first published in Leiden in 1726. The French translation served as an original for a Russian translation published in 1768-1774. In 1780 it was published separately in German and English, and during the 18th century was widely read in Europe.

Numerous critical translations of the Shajara-i Turk were published in the 19th and 20th centuries, which serve as historical sources for modern scholars. The first critical translation, undertaken by professional scholars, was published in Kazan in 1825. The Turkish translation of the text published in Kazan was undertaken by philologist Ahmed Vefik Pasha and was initially published in 1864. The most influential Western publication was Histoire des Mogols et des Tatares par Aboul-Ghazi Behadour Khan, publiée, traduite et annotée par le baron Desmaisons, St.-Pétersbourg, 1871-1874.

Nikita Bichurin was the first to notice that the biography of the epic ancestor of the Turkic people Oguz-Kagan by Abu al-Ghazi and the Turco-Persian manuscripts (Rashid al-Din, Hondemir, Abulgazi) has a striking similarity with the Maodun biography in the Chinese sources (feud between father and son and murder of the former, the direction and sequence of conquests, and so on). That observation, confirmed by other scholars, associated the name of Maodun with the epic personality of the Oguz-Kagan. The similarity is even more remarkable because at the time of the writing, no Chinese annals were translated into either oriental or western languages, and Abu al-Ghazi could not have known about the Eastern Huns or Maodun.

The literary significance of Shajara-i Turk is that Abu al-Ghazi was openly against the use of the Chaghatay literary language because it carried a strong Persian influence. Abu al-Ghazi's language is an easy, simple folk language of the Khiva Uzbeks and is quite different from the Chaghatay literary language. The style of Abu al-Ghazi, despite the scientific nature of his compositions, is distinguished by clarity and richness of vocabulary, and is interspersed with Uzbek folk expressions and proverbs.

Abu al-Ghazi's son, Abu al-Muzaffar Anusha Muhammad Bahadur, reassigned the task to complete the work of his father Shajara-i Turk to a certain Mahmud bin Mulla Muhammad Zaman Urgench. It was finalised in 1665. The work lists a Turkic genealogy starting from the biblical Adam and the primogenitor of the Turks, Oguz-Khan, and provides legendary details on their descendants including Chengiz Khan and the Shaybanid dynasty, providing a good picture of Mongol and Turkic views of history at that time.

- Edition:
- Translation:

== Legacy ==
16413 Abulghazi, an asteroid which was discovered on 28 January 1987 by Eric Walter Elst at La Silla Observatory, Chile, was named after him.
