= Turkmen rug =

Type of handmade floor-covering textile

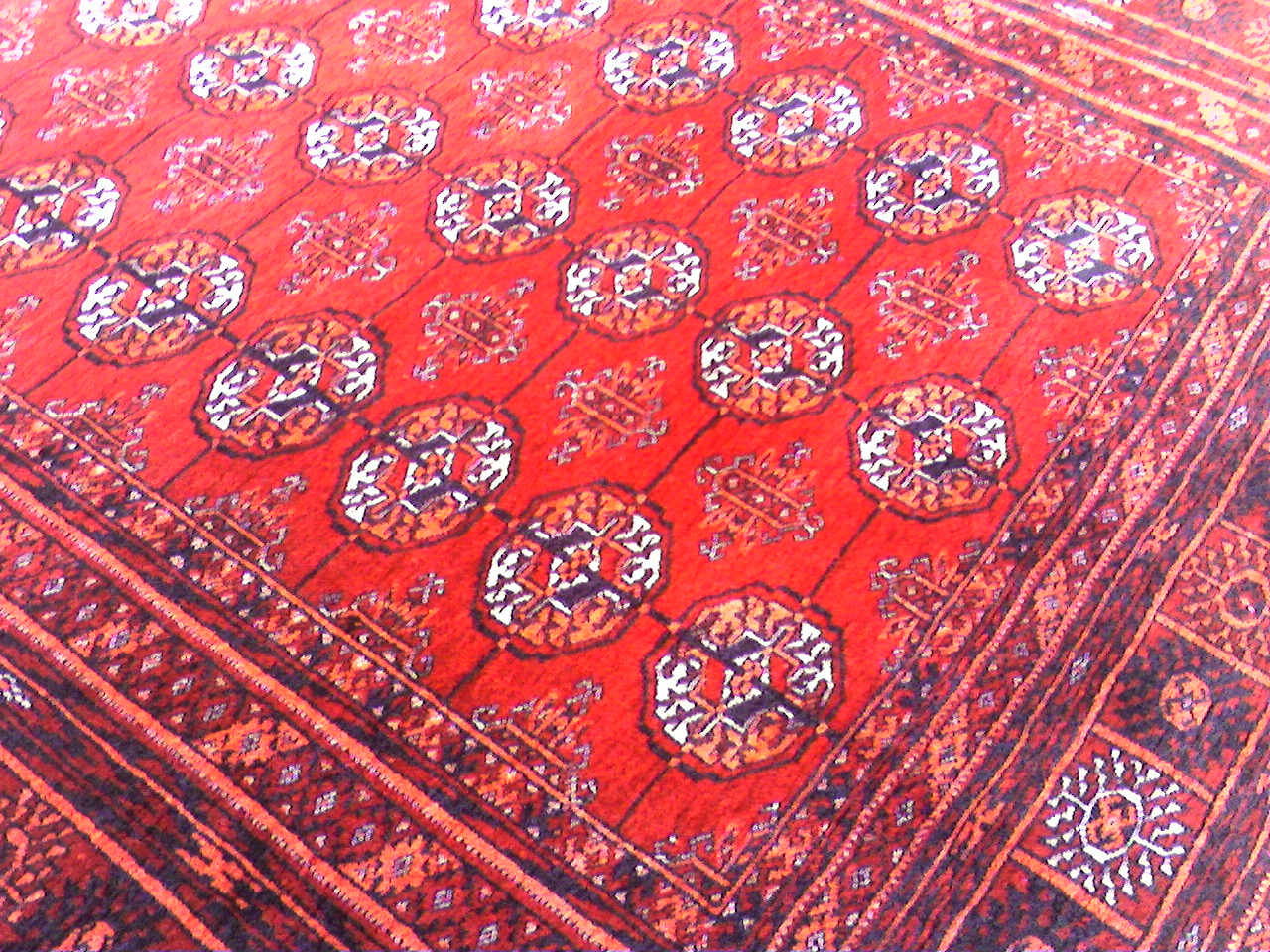
- The Teke design Turkmen carpet. This pattern is often referred to as the "Bukhara" print design.
- Type: Carpeting
- Material: Wool and cotton
- Production method: Knotting
- Production process: Handicraft
- Place of origin: Turkmenistan

Traditional Turkmen carpet making art in Turkmenistan
- UNESCO Intangible Cultural Heritage
- Country: Turkmenistan
- Reference: 01486
- Region: Asia and the Pacific

Inscription history
- Inscription: 2019 (14th session)
- List: Representative

A Turkmen rug (Turkmen: Türkmen haly [tʏɾkˈmøn χɑˈɫɯ]) is a type of handmade floor-covering textile originating in Central Asia. They were originally produced by the Turkmen tribes of Turkmenistan, Afghanistan, and Iran, and are a cultural symbol of the Turkmen people. They are used for various purposes, including tent rugs, door hangings and bags of various sizes. Turkmen rugs are different from Afghan and Persian rugs.

Traditional Turkmen carpet making art has been inscribed on the Representative list of the Intangible Cultural Heritage of Humanity by the Intergovernmental Committee for the Safeguarding of Intangible Cultural Heritage of UNESCO in 2019.

== History ==
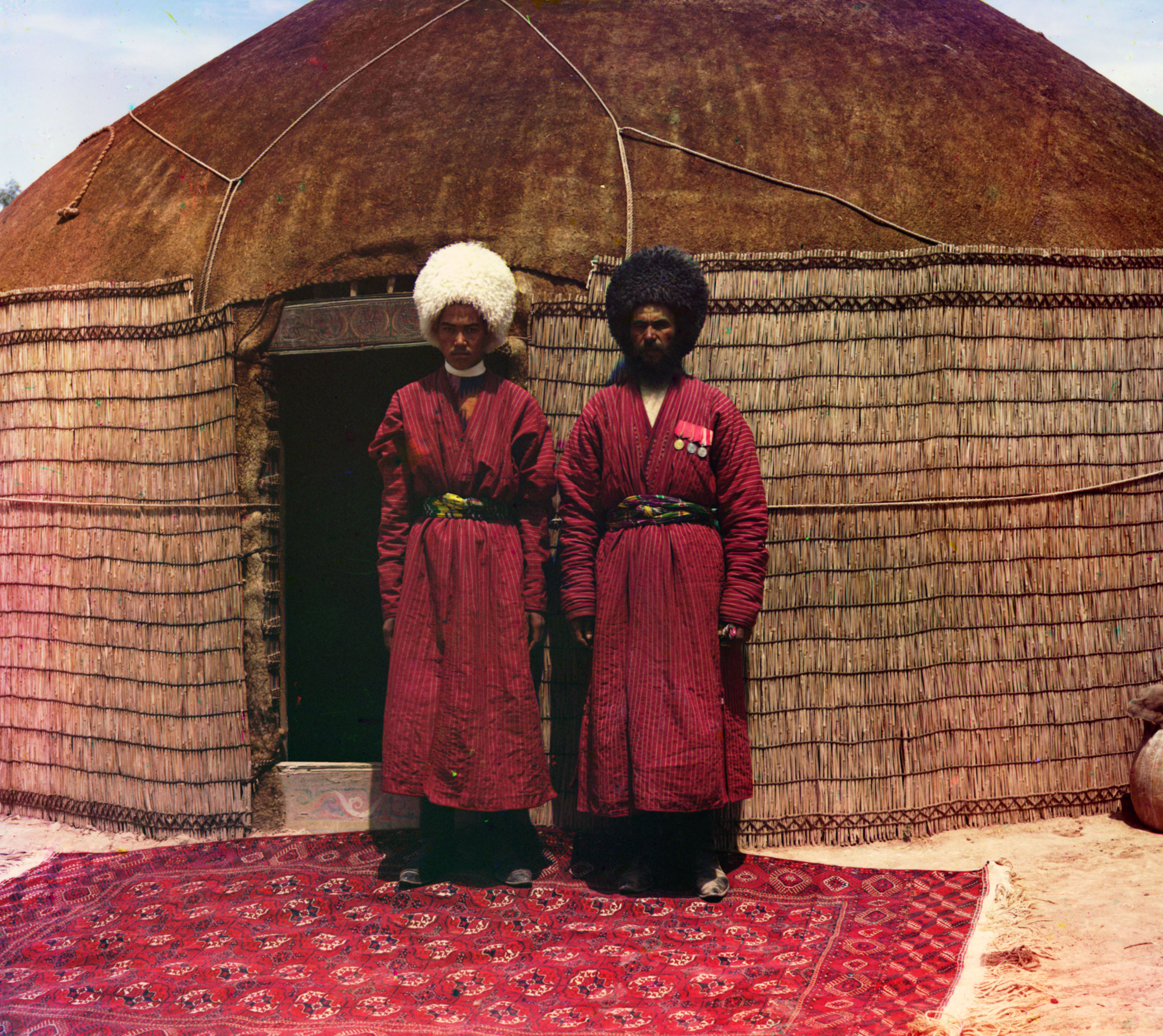
Two Turkmen men standing on a carpet in front of a yurt. (1905–1915)

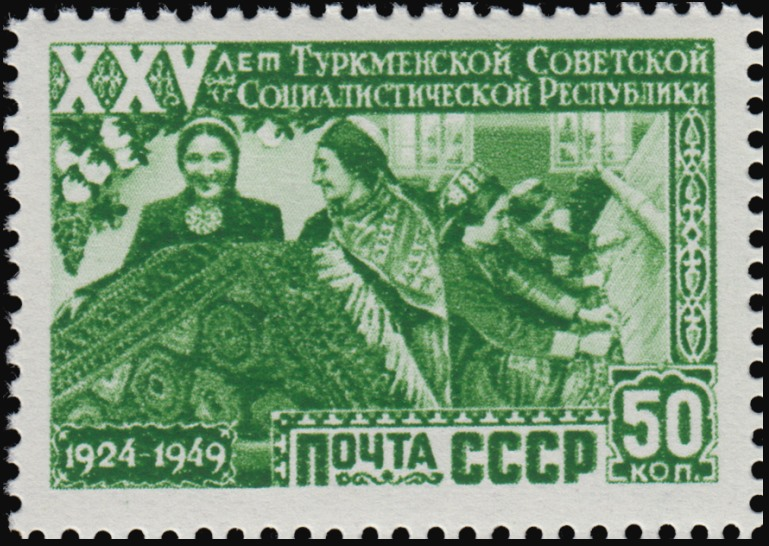
1950 Soviet stamp depicting Turkmen carpet weavers

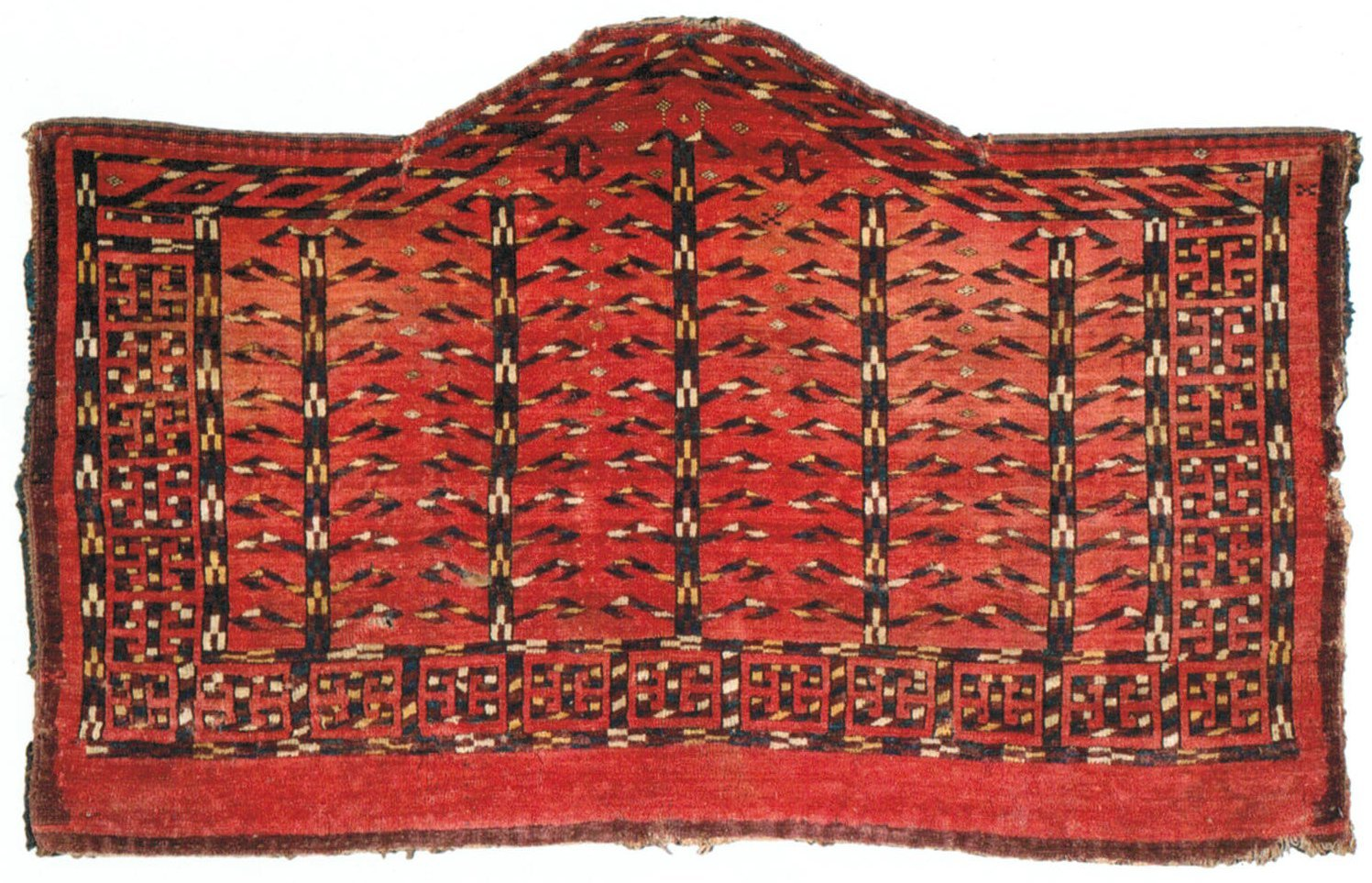
Five Tree Yomut Asmalyk, Turkmenistan, 18-19th century.

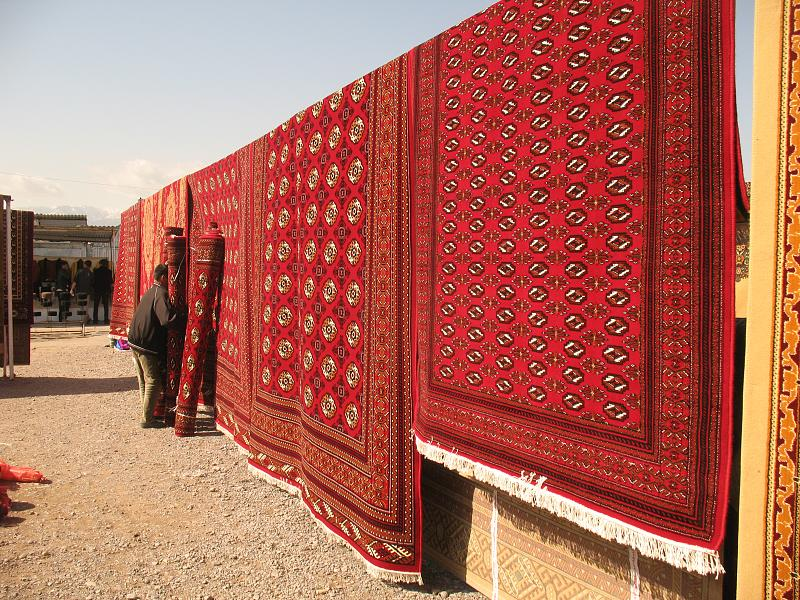
Carpets in Altyn Asyr Bazaar

Several centuries ago, almost all Turkmen rugs were produced by nomadic tribes almost entirely with locally obtained materials, wool from the herds and vegetable dyes, or other natural dyes from the land. They used geometrical designs that varied from tribe to tribe; most famous are the Yomut, Ersari, Saryk, Salur, and Teke. Irregularities, considered part of the charm by many rug collectors were fairly common since natural materials varied from batch to batch and woolen warp or weft may stretch, especially on a loom that is regularly folded up for transport and set up anew at another camp. More recently, large rug workshops in the cities have appeared, there are fewer irregularities, and the technology has changed some. Since about 1910, synthetic dyes have been used along with natural ones. The size of nomadic rugs is limited to what can be done on a nomad's portable loom; larger rugs have always been produced in the villages, but they are now more common. Using cotton for warp and weft threads has also become common.

The rugs produced in large numbers for export in Pakistan and Iran and sold under the name of Turkmen rugs are mostly made using synthetic dyes, with cotton warps and wefts and wool pile. They have little in common with the original Turkmen tribal rugs. In these export rugs, various patterns and colours are used, but the most typical is that of the Bukhara design, which derives from the Tekke main carpet, often with a red or tan background (picture). Another is derived from the Ersari main carpet, with the octagonal elephant's foot design. The Turkmen Carpet Museum, which preserves examples of the original Turkmen tribal rugs, is located in Ashgabat.

Many Afghan rugs with the traditional Turkmen design are made by ethnic Turkmens living in this country. Afghanistan produces a lot of rugs, mainly for export, and many of those are in a "Bokhara" design. However, there are also some Afghan rugs using Turkmen designs.

== Turkmenistan ==
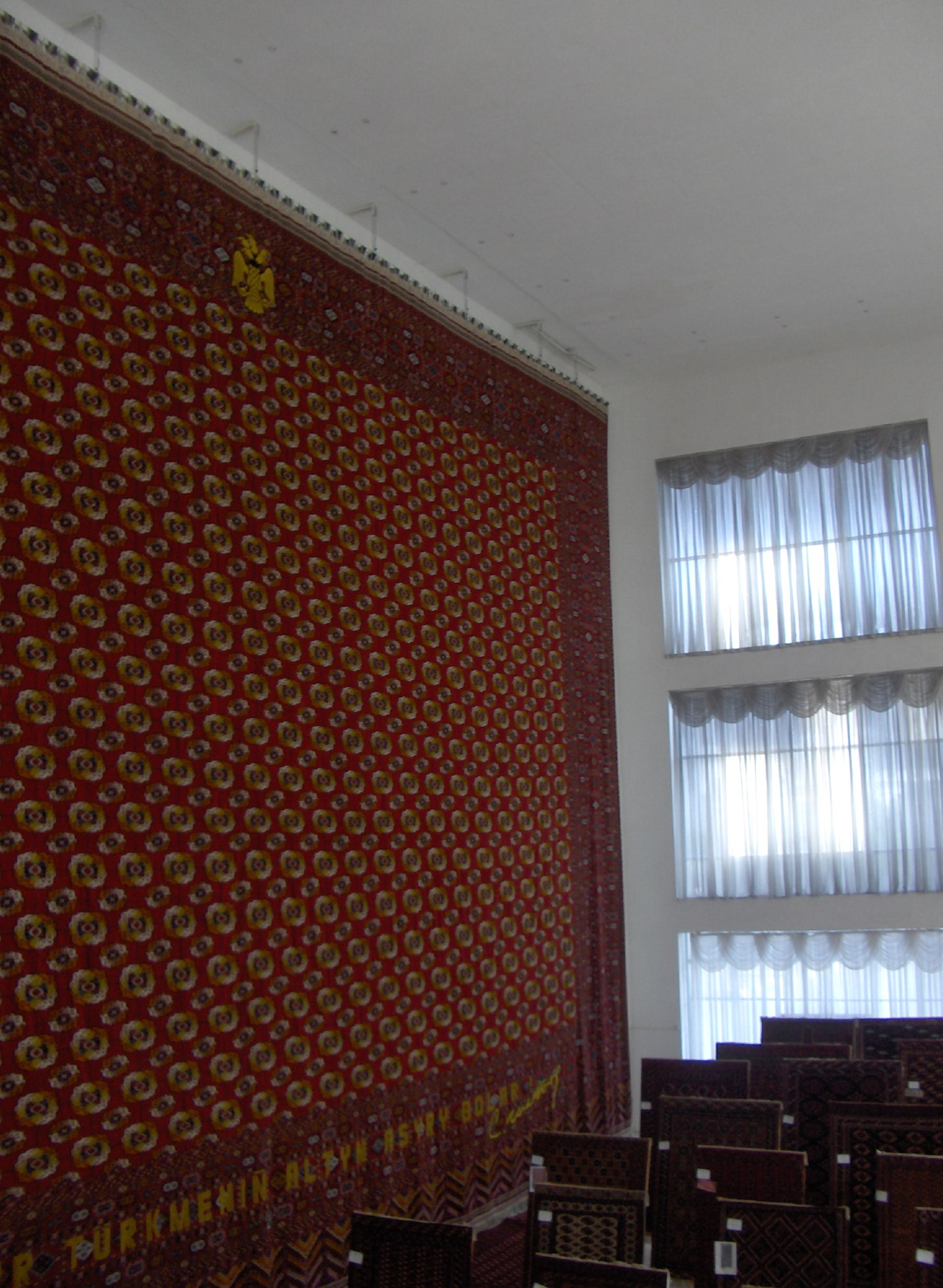
The largest carpet in the world

At the end of the 20th century, carpet weaving in Turkmenistan had become one of the most important sectors of the economy. In 1992, Turkmen Carpet Day officially became a public national holiday, celebrated annually on the last Sunday in May. Among the modern Turkmen carpets stands the world's largest handmade carpet total area of 301 m^{2}, which was woven in 2001, and in 2003 entered into the Guinness Book of Records.

=== Heraldry ===
The vertical strip of the flag of Turkmenistan shows the five main patterns of Turkmen carpets. These patterns are displayed with secondary figures distributed along the edges. The patterns reflect the national unity of Turkmenistan. The five traditional carpet motifs in the red disc of the Emblem of Turkmenistan represent the five major tribes or houses, and stand for the traditional and religious values of the country. These Turkmen tribes in traditional order are Teke, Yomut, Arsary, Chowdur and Saryk (Saryq).

Images in heraldry
Flag of Turkmenistan	Emblem of Turkmenistan	Emblem of Turkmenistan (1992–2000)	Emblem of Turkmenistan (2000–2003)	Emblem of Turkmenistan as a republic within the Soviet Union (1937–1991) and post-independent Turkmenistan (1991–1992)

=== Ministry of Carpets ===
State Association Turkmenhaly is a major supplier to the world market of pure wool pile hand-made Turkmen carpets from Turkmenistan. The principal activities of the corporation are the production and sale of Turkmen carpets and rugs, preserving the traditions of carpet weaving hand, the restoration of old carpet ornaments and articles.

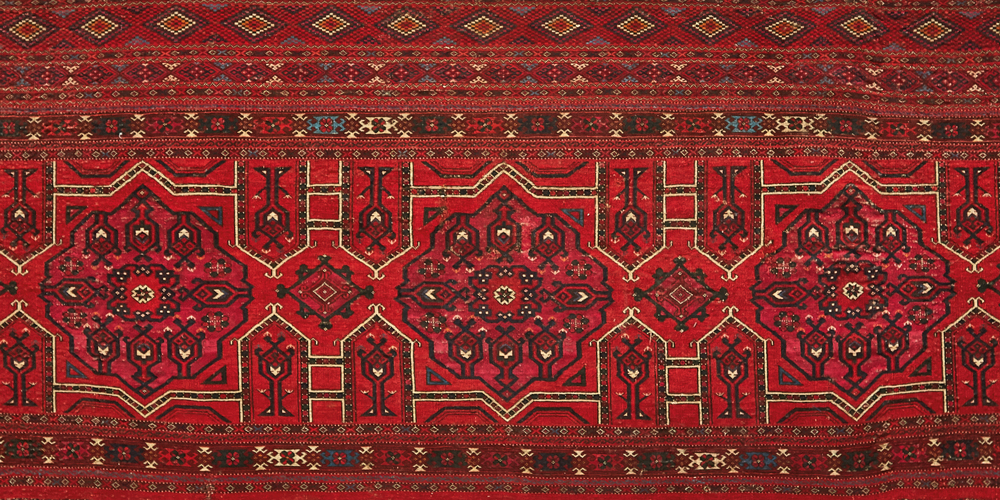
Piece of a Turkmen camel trapping of Salyr design

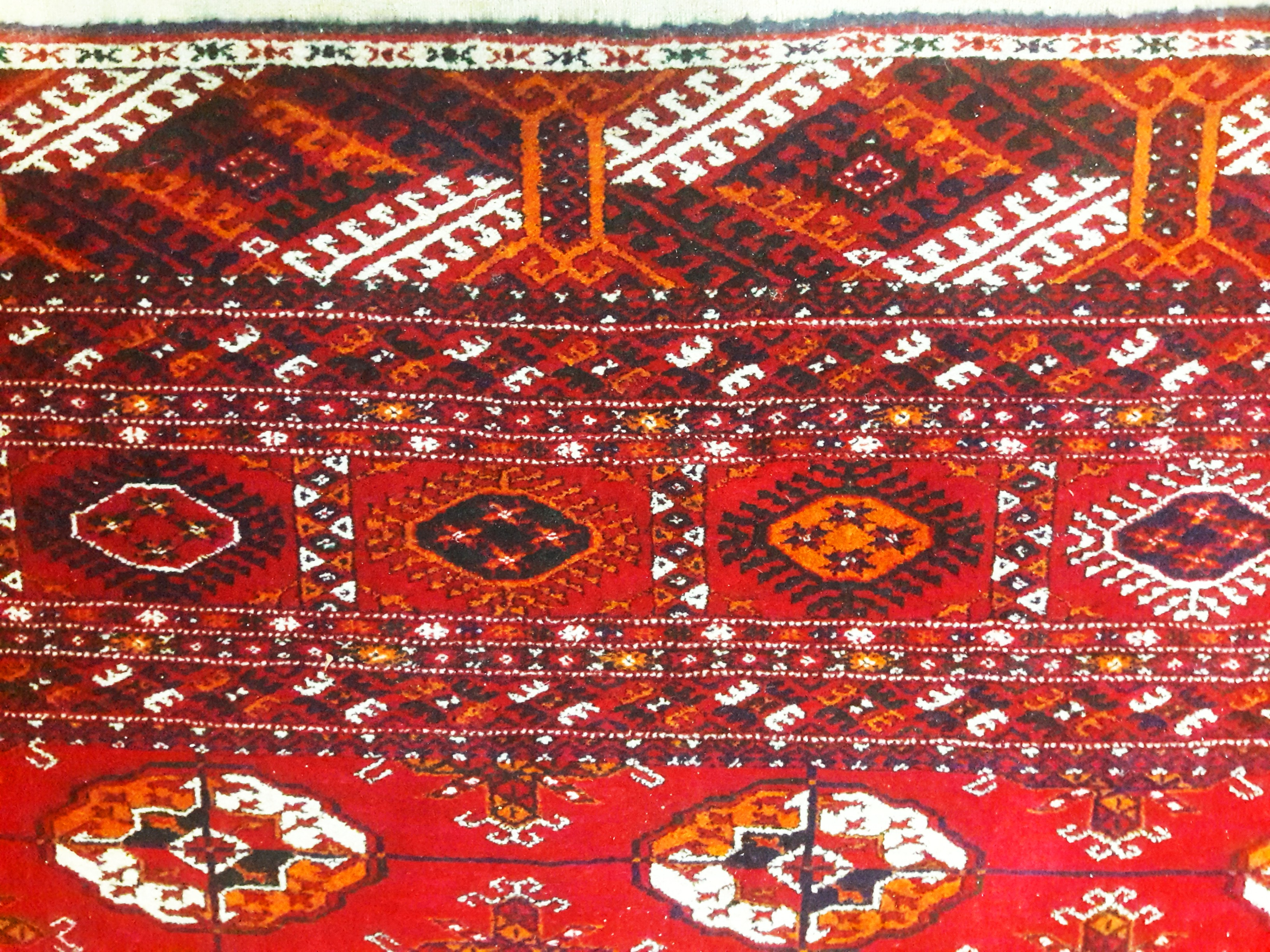
Fragment of a Turkmen Teke carpet with national patterns

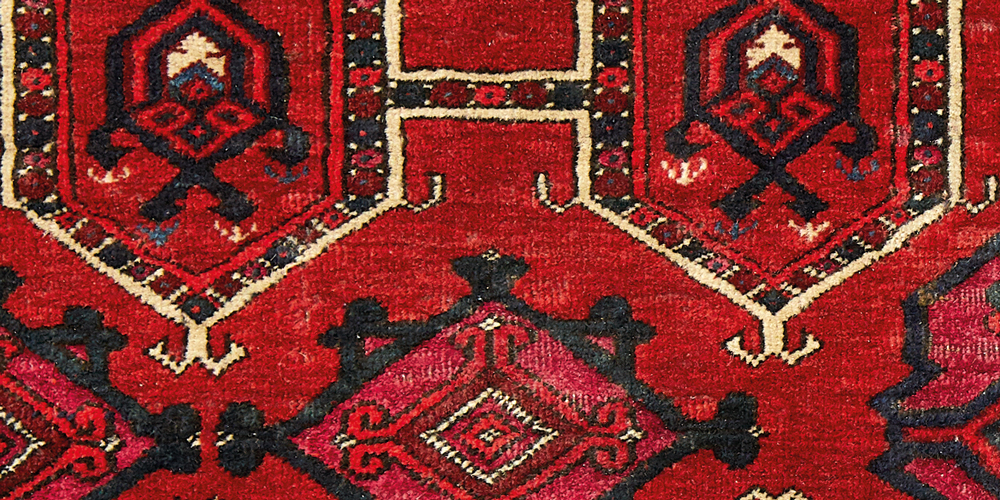
Fragment of a Turkmen carpet showing the pattern of guardian figures of the four gates of the Turkmen universe

=== Turkmen Carpet Museum ===
The Turkmenistan Presidential Decree of 20 March 1993 in Ashgabat created the Turkmen Carpet Museum. The Carpet Museum is one of the cultural centers of Turkmenistan, which has about 2,000 carpet exhibits, including rare ones, on display. For example, the museum has the smallest carpet product, designed to be worn with keys. The museum conducts restoration of antique carpets as well. It's a challenging process; some artfully woven old specimens contain up to 1,350,000 knots. The museum is constantly updated, and its employees conduct searches and compiles collections of old carpets. The new building of the National Museum of Turkmen Carpets has an overall space of 5089 m^{2}. The museum also hosts international scientific forums and conferences.

=== Major towns producing rugs ===
Bereket has a Turkmen carpet weaving factory which has been in operation since 1923.

== See also ==
- Yomut carpet
- Suzani (textile)
- Tush kyiz
