= Turkmen tribes =

Major modern Turkmen tribes

Turkmen tribes Türkmen taýpalary تۆركمن طایپالاریٛ
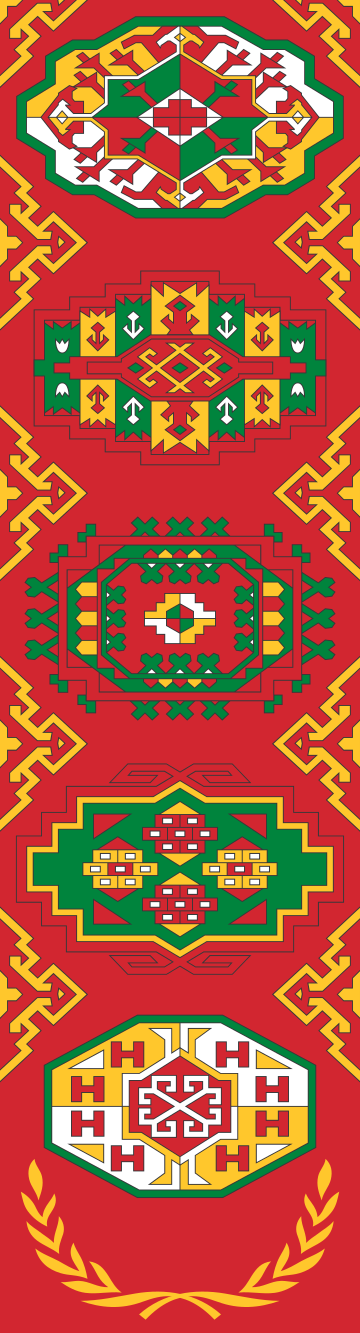
- Carpet rosettes (göller) representing five major modern Turkmen tribes as used in the National Flag of Turkmenistan
- Ethnicity: Turkmen
- Descended from: Oghuz tribes
- Branches: Teke, Yomut, Ersari, Chowdur, Gokleng, Saryk, and others
- Language: Turkmen
- Religion: Sunni Islam

The major modern Turkmen tribes are Teke, Yomut, Ersari, Chowdur, Gokleng, and Saryk. The most numerous are the Teke.

The origin of all of these tribes is traced to 24 ancient Oghuz tribes, among which the Salur tribe played a prominent role as its people are considered the ancestors of modern Turkmen tribes such as Teke, Yomut and Ersari.

Seljuks, Khwarazmians, Qara Qoyunlu, Aq Qoyunlu, Ottomans, and Afsharids are also believed to descend from the early Oghuz Turkmen tribes of Qiniq, Begdili, Yiwa, Bayandur, Kayi, and Afshar respectively.

== Tribes ==
=== Teke ===
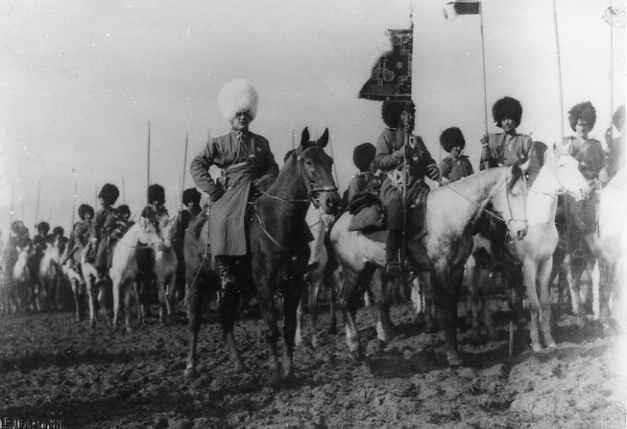
Teke Horse Regiment, beginning of the 20th century

The Teke ("billy goat" in Turkmen) constitute the largest and historically one of the most influential modern Turkmen tribes. The Teke descended from the Oghuz tribe of Salur in the 11th or 12th century. The tribe is subdivided into two, the Ahal Teke and Mary Teke. British Lt. Col. C.E. Stuart in 1830s also noted a subdivision into four clans, the Wakil (another variant is Wekil), Beg, Suchmuz, and Bukshi:

"The Wakil and Beg clans are collectively called Toghtamish, as they are descended from a person of that name. The Suchmuz and Bukshi clans are collectively called Otamish..."

Stuart estimated in 1881 the number of "Akhal Tekke" at "25,000 tents" and of "Merv Tekke" at "40,000 tents", which latter number included "Salor (5000 tents)". He estimated five people per tent, implying a total Teke tribal population of about 325,000 in that year.

The Teke militarily resisted, mostly successfully, Persian incursions in the 19th century. The Teke came under Russian colonial rule in the 1880s. Though the Turkmen tribes defeated Russian troops during the first incursion in 1879, a subsequent invasion between 1880 and 1881, culminating in the second Battle of Gökdepe, resulted in imposition of Russian Imperial authority. Following the surrender, the Teke commander, Ovezmurat Dykma-Serdar, was commissioned a major in the Russian Imperial Army. Russia's conquest of the Teke was completed in 1884 with the taking of Merv.

Today members of Teke tribe are found predominantly in the southeastern regions of Turkmenistan. They represent over a third of Turkmenistan's population (more than 1.6 million, as of 2014).

=== Ersari ===
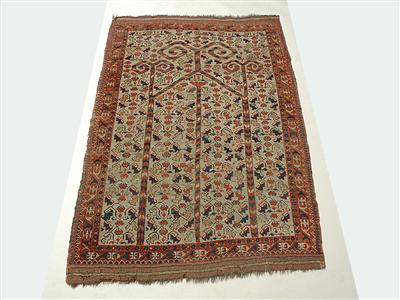
Ersari carpet

Ersari or Ärsary (where er is a brave man, master; and sari is light, bright, yellow in Turkmen language) is another major tribe of the Turkmen people. They live mainly in Turkmenistan, Afghanistan and Pakistan. Ersari people's number is approximately 2.1 million people overall (1 million in Turkmenistan, 1,5 million in Afghanistan, Turkey, Iran, Great Britain, Saudi Arabia, United Arab Emirates, Russia and other countries). Ersari has four sub-tribal divisions: Kara, Bekewul, Gunesh and Uludepe.

Ersari are direct descendants of the Salur tribe of the Oghuz Turks, as is the Yomud tribe.

Ersari appear to have been a major component of the Sayin Khan Turkmen tribal confederacy, whose Yurt (nomadic territory) in the 13-17th centuries stretched from the Balkan mountains to the Mangishlaq peninsula and north to the Emba river. The label Sayin Khani, given to them by the other nomadic peoples around, referred to their emergence from the breakup of the Golden Horde, (founded by Genghis Khan's grandson Batu, known as the Sayin Khan), in order to differentiate their origins from tribes that came from the territories of Hulegu (Iran) or Chaghatay (Trans-Oxanian Central Asia).

The Sayin Khan Turkmens were an organized confederation of tribes thought to be divided, in typical Turco-Mongol fashion, into two parts, the Ichki (inner) and Tashki (outer) Oghuz. Abu al-Ghazi Bahadur, the Khan of Khiva in the 17th century, in his book Shajara-i Tarākima ("The Genealogical Tree of the Turkmen", 1659) does not indicate whether the term Tashki refers to an organizational, military or purely geographical meaning. Sometime in the 17th century, in part to the drying up of the western Uzboy channel of the Amu Darya, the Ersari and its major subtribes moved east to the banks of the main course of the Amudarya. One sub-tribe, the Ali-Eli, also moved eastward, but remained near Kaka region, which is now in Ahal Province of Turkmenistan.

=== Saryk ===
The Saryk mostly live on the upper Marghab River.

=== Chowdur ===
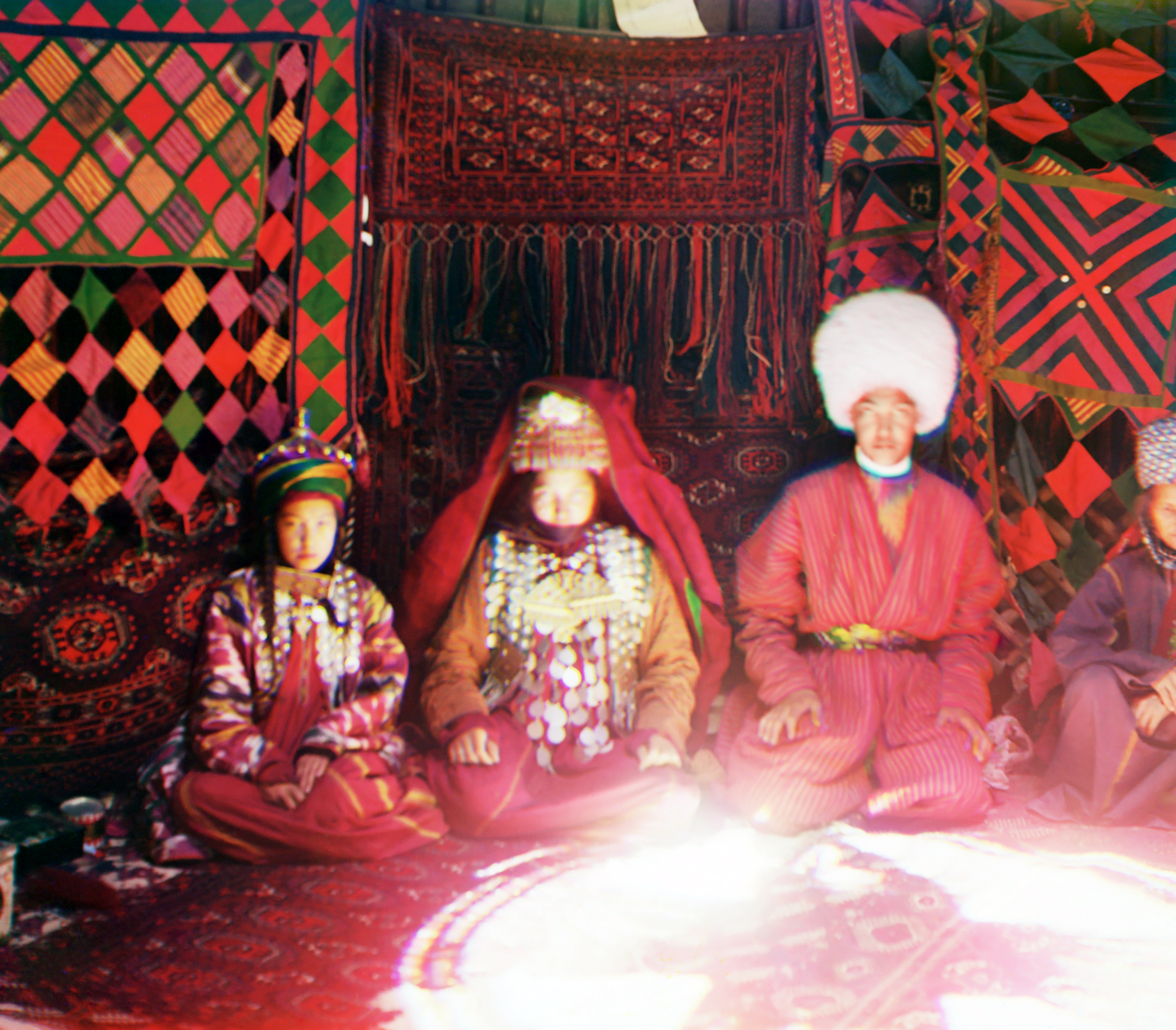
Inside the Turkmen tent, between 1905 and 1915

The Chowdur tribe are direct descendants of the Chavuldur tribe of the Oghuz Turks and are thought to have occupied the left flank of Oghuz Khan’s army.

They lived at the eastern shores the Caspian Sea since approximately at least the beginning of the second millennium. Abul Ghazi wrote that they had arrived in Mangyshlak as early as the 11th century. Prior to the rise of first Seljuk sultan Toghrul Beg in the mid-11th century, many tribes followed the lead of their tribal leaders such as Qilik bey, Kazan bey and Karaman bey, and settled in Mangyshlak. Most of them were members of the Imir, Dukur, Düker (Döger), Igdir, Chavuldur, Karkin, Salor or Agar (Ajar) tribes.

In 1219, the Mongols crushed the Khwarazmian Empire. Two years later, in 1221, the Mongol conquest pushed the Oghuz tribes, including the Chowdur, from the Syr Darya region into the Kara Kum area and along the Caspian Sea.

In the early 16th century, the Chowdur formed a confederate or aymaq in the Sayin Khan confederation. The Chowdur were primarily concentrated in the Mangyshlak Peninsula on the northeastern Caspian coast. The Kalmuks moved into the Mangyshlak Peninsula, the Sayin Khan confederation broke up and the Chowdur ended up southeast of Khiva, loosely confederated, but under the authority of the Yomut tribe. There are indications that some Chowdur ended up in the mid-Amu Darya region near the north of Charjui. Under the Khanate of Khiva, during the 19th century, Chowdur included the Igdir, Bozachi, Abdal, and Arabachi tribes.

=== Yomud ===
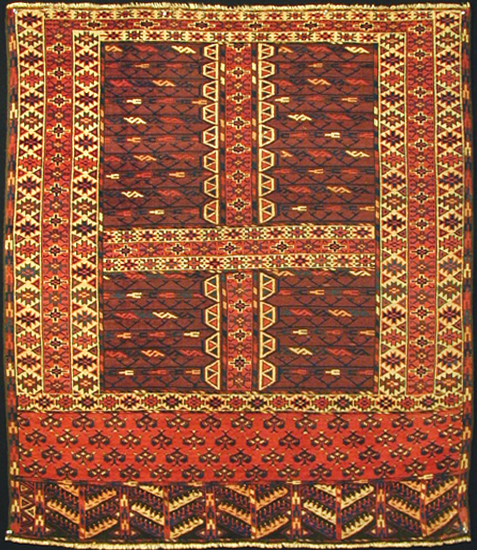
Yomud rug

Yomuds (also called Yomuts) are one of the major modern Turkmen tribes. They descend from the Salur tribe of the Oghuz Turks.

The historical region of settlement is the southern part of the Balkan welayaty (province) of Turkmenistan, near the Etrek River adjacent to Iran, between Etrek and Gorgan, as well as in the north, in Dashoguz velayat. The Yomuds were divided into sedentary, semi-nomadic and nomadic groups, the last being the majority. Sedentary Yomud Turkmens lived in the villages of Chekishler and Esenguly located in today's Balkan welayaty; semi-nomadic Yomuds lived in the lower reaches of the Etrek (in two large villages) in summer, and in winter they broke up into small groups and lived nomadically. Nomadic Turkmen Yomuds usually left for Etrek or Iran in autumn and winter.

The last de facto ruler of the Khanate of Khiva was a representative of the Turkmen Yomud tribe, Junaid Khan.

== Tribal structure and organization ==
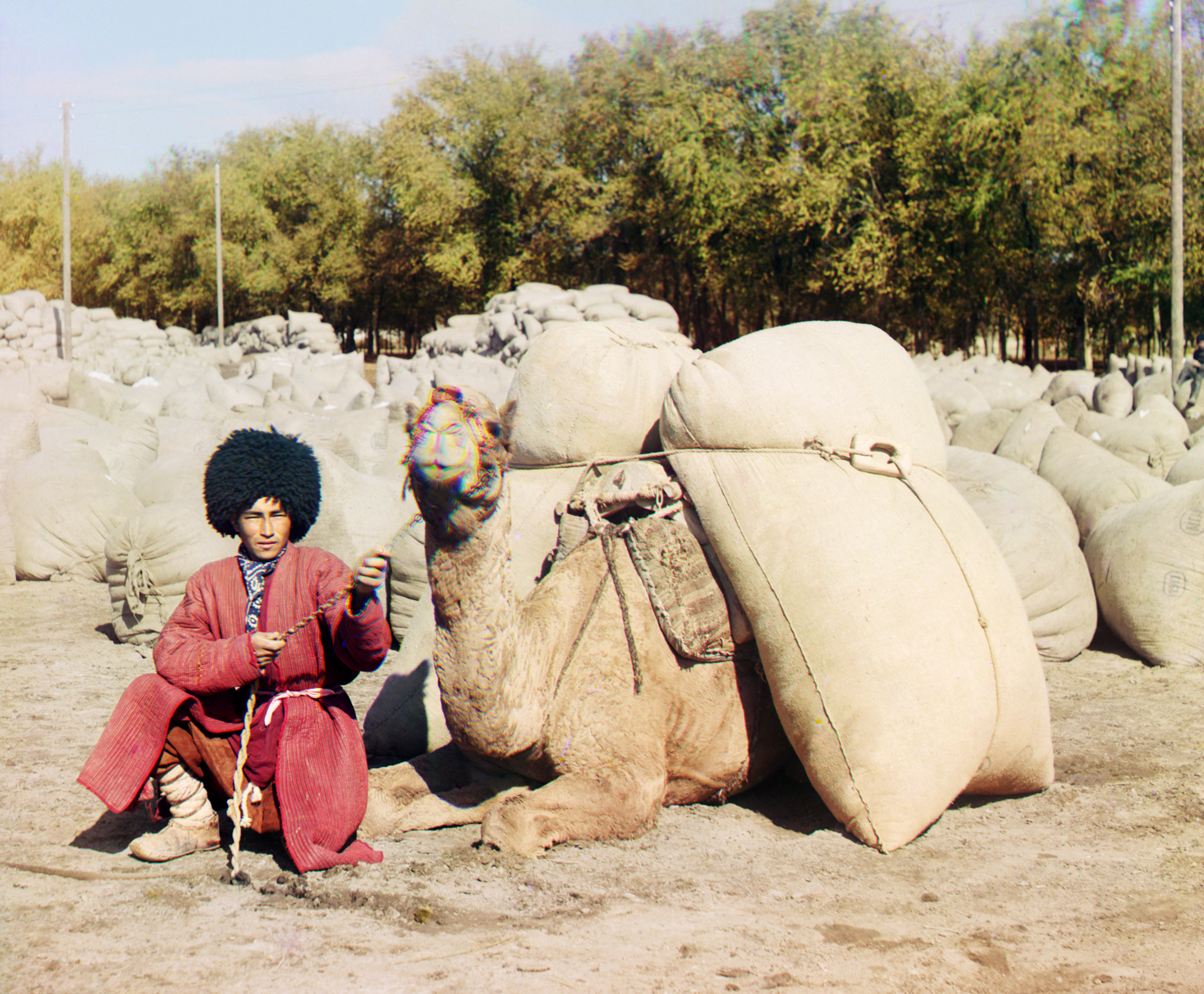
A Turkmen man of Central Asia in traditional clothes. Photo by Prokudin-Gorsky between 1905 and 1915.

Turkmen society has traditionally been divided into tribes (Turkmen: taýpalar). The full tribal structure of Turkmens is as follows: halk, il, taýpa, urug, kök, kowum, kabile, aýmak/oýmak, oba, bölük, bölüm, gandüşer, küde, depe, desse, lakam, top, birata, topar, and tire.

The origin of all present-day Turkmen tribes is traced to 24 Oghuz tribes. Abu al-Ghazi Bahadur, in his 1659 work Shajara-i Tarākima, places special emphasis on the Salur tribe of the Oghuz, since a few major Turkmen tribes, the Teke, Yomuts and Ersaris, derived from it. Abu al-Ghazi claims that the leader of the Salur tribe was Salur Ogurcik Alp. who had six sons: Berdi, Buka, Usar, Kusar, Yaycı and Dingli.

At the beginning of the 20th century, Feodor Mikhailov, a Russian officer in the military administration of the Transcaspian Region of the Russian Empire, noted, "all Turkmen, rich and poor, live almost completely alike". He also added that the Turkmen "put the principles of brotherhood, equality, and freedom into practice more completely and consistently than any of our contemporary European republics."

The five traditional carpet rosettes (Turkmen: göller) that form motifs in the coat of arms of Turkmenistan and on its flag belong to these tribes (and are named after them; see, for example, "Yomut carpet").

== Turkmen way of life ==
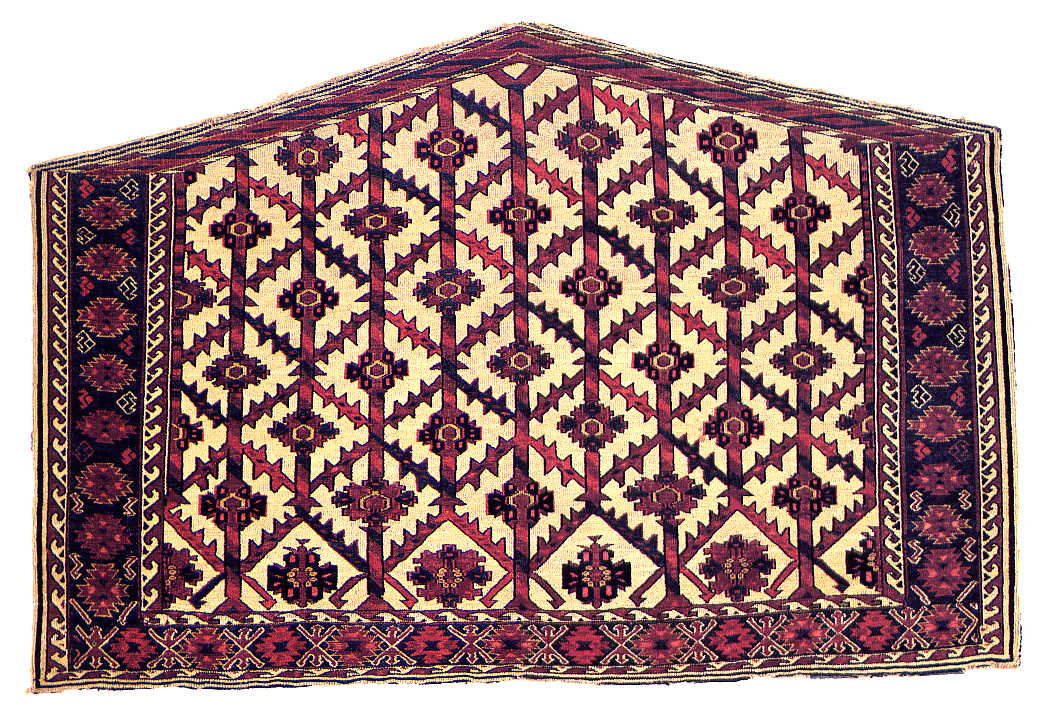
Turkmen asmalyk carpet, a textile trapping used in a Turkmen wedding procession

Modern Turkmen tribes were usually ruled by chiefs or leaders (Turkmen: serdar) and guided by elders (Turkmen: aksakal plural aksakallar), literally "white beards", who, most of the time, were chosen by consensus. Elders guided their people by unwritten customary laws called tore or adat. Besides guiding and regulating affairs between individuals, families and groups, elders, along with serdars, made important decisions on distribution of water, land or on declaring and waging war.

Turkmen tribes recognized only their free will as the primary authority and were never loyal to any of the foreign powers that conquered their lands. They always chose to rise and fight for their freedom, as evidenced in numerous battles and revolts against the neighboring Uzbek Khanates, Persian and Russian Empires. Such khans and serdars of various Turkmen tribes as Aba Serdar, Keýmir Kör, Nurberdi Han, Gowshut Han, Dykma Serdar, and others are the most prominent and are still respected by modern Turkmen.

== See also ==
- Oghuz tribes
- Kayi
- Salur
- Bayandur
- Teke
- Yomud
- Ersari
- Ersari baba
- Shajara-i Tarākima
- Russian conquest of Central Asia
- Battle of Geok Tepe (1879)
- Khivan campaign of 1873.
