= Turkmen Carpet Museum =

National museum in Ashgabat, Turkmenistan

- Türkmen haly muzeýi
- Established: 24 October 1994
- Location: Ashgabat, Turkmenistan
- Coordinates: 37.923999°N 58.377880°E
- Type: national museum

The Turkmen Carpet Museum or the National Carpet Museum is a national museum, situated on 5 Görogly Street, Ashgabat, Turkmenistan.

The museum opened on 24 October 1994. It has the largest collection of Turkmen carpets of any museum. It has a rich collection of Turkmen carpets from the medieval through to the 20th century, including over 1000 carpets from the 18th and 19th centuries. Aside from its extensive collection of antique carpets, it has many carpet articles, chuvals, khurjuns, torba, etc.

On the first floor of the museum are Teke and Saryk carpets. The museum is noted for its huge Teke carpets. One Tekke carpet measures 193m² and weighs a tonne and was made by some 40 people in 1941 to make a curtain for the Bolshoi Theatre in Moscow. Another, made in 2001, is even larger, measuring 301m² and 14 by 21.2 metres and was made to commemorate 10 years of Turkmen independence from the Soviet Union. It is recognised by the Guinness World Records as the largest hand-woven carpet in the world. One carpet, made in 1968, is representative of all the tribes in Turkmenistan, fusing together the different styles to display unity. The museum also has carpets dedicated to President Nyýazow. Some of the carpets on display are two-sided, often featuring different design on each side.

== Institutional authority ==
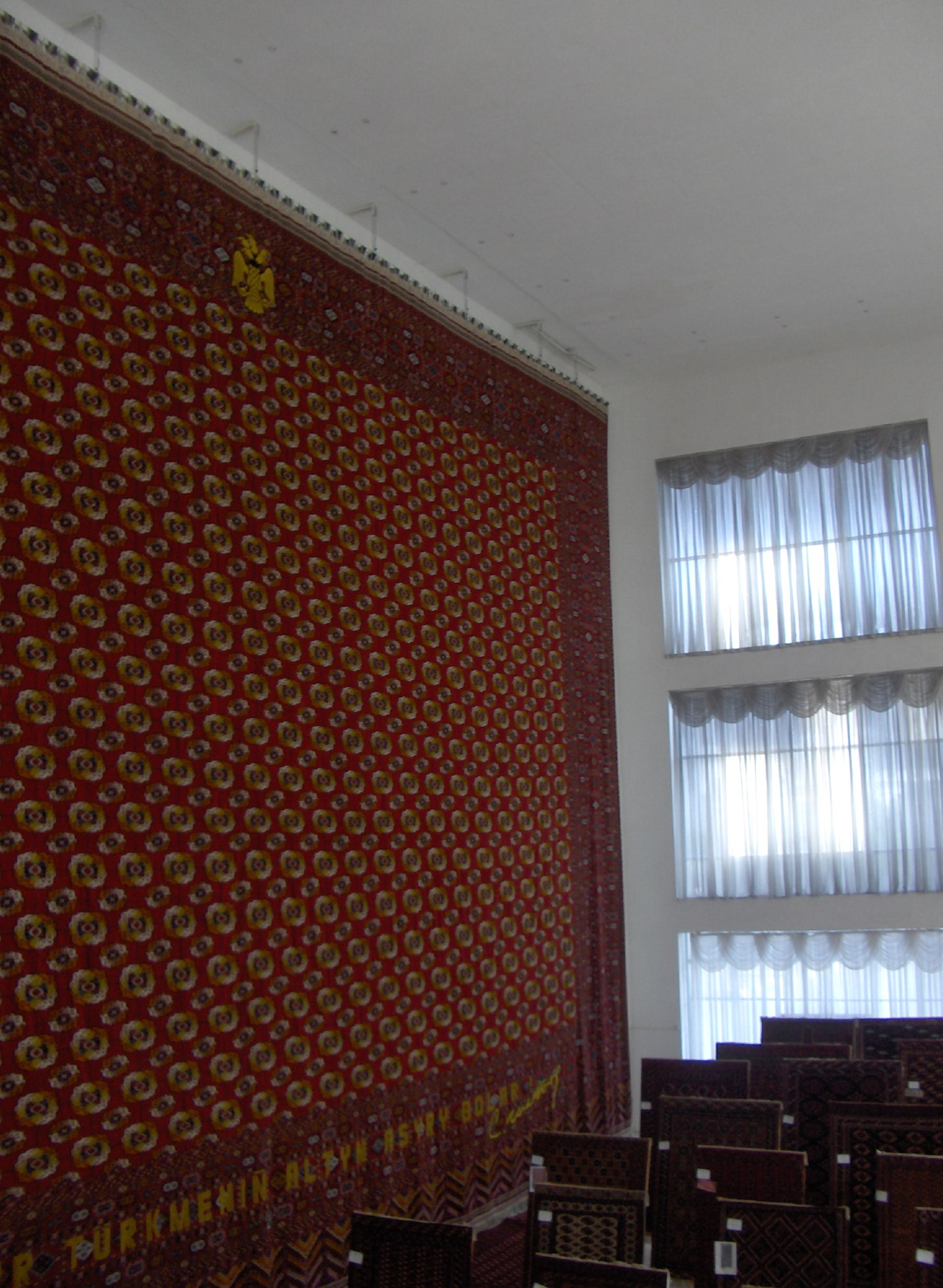
The largest hand-woven carpet in the world at the museum

The carpet museum is also recognized by the Turkmen government as the official authority on Turkmen carpets. Although many carpets are bought from the museum shop or factory, charging M15,000 per square meter of carpet, depending on the carpet quality, many are bought in the extensive Altyn Asyr Bazaar on the city outskirts. If anybody in Turkmenistan purchases a carpet and wants to export it, experts from the Carpet Museum must inspect it and issue a receipt confirming that the carpet is not of historical value, to allow it to be exported from Turkmenistan. Usually there are restrictions on exporting carpets older than 30 years old and if it is determined that the carpet has historical value, then a receipt for export will not be given. This policy restriction on exporting carpets is not only an obligation for tourists but Turkmen citizens also must have their carpets inspected. This has had a profound impact on entrepreneurs in Turkmenistan who find it difficult to develop their businesses internationally.
