= Emblem of Turkmenistan =

Versions
- 2000–2003

- 1992–2000
- Armiger: Turkmenistan
- Crest: A crescent and five mullets argent
- Shield: A disc azure, a depiction of an Akhal-Teke horse on a circular disc gules with a five carpet guls surrounds the sheaves of wheat and seven flowers in bottom.
- Other elements: An emblem is placed in an eight-point starburst (known as the Rub El Hizb (۞) vert

The State Emblem of Turkmenistan was created after Turkmenistan gained independence from the Soviet Union in 1991. Like other post-Soviet republics whose symbols do not predate the October Revolution, the current emblem retains some components of the Soviet one such as the cotton, wheat and rug. The eight-point green starburst (known as the Rub el Hizb, a symbol of Islam, to which a majority of Turkmen profess) with golden edges features in its center a red circular disc which carries sheaves of wheat, five carpet guls, and centered upon that a smaller blue circle with a lifelike (rather than heraldically stylised) depiction of former President Saparmurat Niyazov's pet Akhal-Teke horse Yanardag, a source of pride for the Turkmen people. A round variant of the emblem was used from 1992 until 2003, when President Saparmurat Niyazov proposed to change its appearance and said that the ancient Turkmen octagon has been considered to be a symbol of abundance, peace and tranquillity.

== Symbolism ==
The emblem of the Turkmen SSR was used after independence until 1992.

The Türkmenistanyň gerbi is a state symbol that combines the cultural heritage of the Turkmen ancestors, Oguz Khan and the Seljuk dynasty, who in ancient times created a powerful empire, significantly affecting the development of the Turkmens and their Turkic relatives as a whole.

The five traditional carpet motifs on the red disc represent the five major tribes or houses, and stand for the traditional and religious values of the country. These Turkmen tribes in traditional order are Teke (Tekke), Yomut (Yomud), Ärsary (Ersary), Chowdur (Choudur), and Saryk (Saryq). The Salyr (Salor), a tribe that declined as a result of military defeat before the modern period, are not represented, nor are several smaller tribes or subtribes.

The green and red colors appear in this shield because they have been venerated historically by the Turkmen. The central elements are surrounded by sheaves of wheat that allude to the custom to welcome to guests with salt and bread and to the claim that Turkmenistan is the place of origin of white wheat. Atop the wheat and the red circle appear a waxing crescent moon of white, typical of Turkic symbology, and five five-pointed stars also of white. The waxing crescent moon symbolizes the hope of the country for a shining future and the stars represent the five provinces (welayatlar) of Turkmenistan-Ahal, Balkan, Dashoguz, Lebap, and Mary. Most of the elements of the coat of arms are present in the national flag.

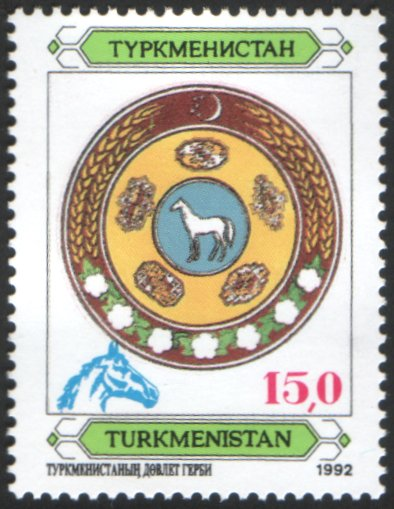
Coat of arms of Turkmenistan on a postage stamp of Turkmenistan, 1992.

Before independence from the USSR, Turkmenistan had an emblem similar to all other Soviet Republics. A single carpet gül, not matching any of the tribal patterns, was represented on the Coat of arms of the Turkmen SSR.

== Usage ==
The Turkmen emblem is used on desks for meetings, assemblies, and on other proposes.

== See also ==
- Flag of Turkmenistan
