= Ersari carpet =

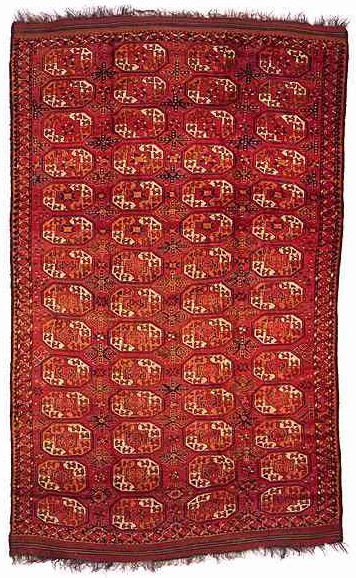
Turkmen Ersari main carpet, mid-19th century, "elephant foot's" design

The Ersari carpet is a type of carpet handmade by the Ersari Turkmen of Turkmenistan and Uzbekistan. More modern carpets may also contain cotton. The colors are dark red, blue, beige and sometimes yellow and blue-green.
