= Ersari baba =

Turkmen tribal leader and hero

Ersari baba (Turkmen : Ärsary baba) is the legendary leader of the Ersari tribe (one of the major Turkmen tribes), who, or most probably whose historical prototype, lived in 13th or 14th century in Mangyshlak (Mangystau Province) or in the vicinity of Balkan mountains (Balkan velayat of Turkmenistan). He was the founder of the loose Sayin Khan Turkmen confederation and is considered to be a common ancestor of all Ersari people, who today live predominantly on the banks of the Amudarya River in Lebap velayat of Turkmenistan and northern provinces of Afghanistan. "Ersari" literally means "yellow brave man" from Turkic (Turkmen) "er" or "är" - brave man, and "sari" or "sary" - yellow.

== Origin ==
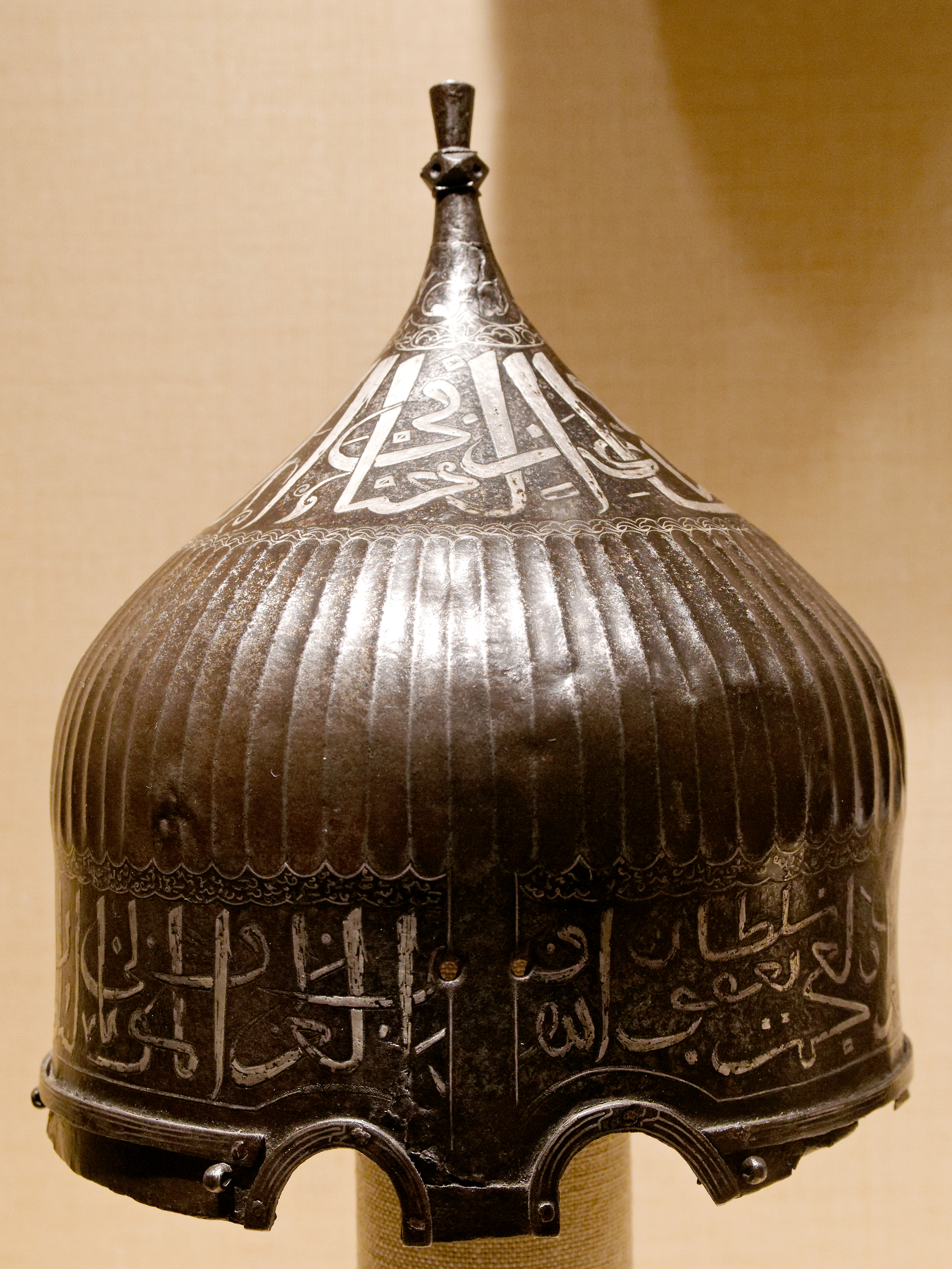
Turkmen helmet (15th century)

Not much is known about the life or activities of Ersari baba or his historical prototype, information is acquired mostly through the historical work and literary masterpiece of the Khan of Khiva and famous historian, Abu al-Ghazi Bahadur, called Shajara-i Tarākima. In his work, Abu al-Ghazi claims that Ersari baba was from the Salur tribe, which in turn is one of the Oghuz tribes and whose people descended from the son of Oghuz Khan - Dag Khan.

It is also mentioned that Ersari baba had 3 sons: Eynel Ghazi, Zeynel Ghazi, Mustafa Ghazi and 1 daughter: Mamabiqah (Mamabike).

He had grandchildren through Eynel Ghazi: To're, Sokman, Layna and Charshangi; through Zeynel Ghazi: Bekevul and Gara, through Mustafa: Uludepe and Gunesh.

Nowadays, descendants of Charshangi live in the vicinity which carries the same toponym. Gara and Bekevul live in Garabekewul etrap of Lebap velayat (Turkmenistan), Gunesh and Uludepe are found in the northern provinces of Afghanistan.

== Sayin Khan confederation ==
Ersari baba is widely considered to be the founder of the Sayin Khan confederation, a loose confederation of Turkmen tribes living in Mangyshlak in XIII or XIV century, a period just after a catastrophic Mongol invasion of Khwarazmian Empire. It is believed that he managed to assemble warring Turkmen tribes who stayed in Central Asia (others left for Anatolia and territories that today are part of Azerbaijan) and put their differences aside to create a new yurt. He is celebrated among the Ersari people as a hero who played a prominent role in consolidation of Turkmen tribes at that arduous period in Central Asia.

The label Sayin Khan confederation was given by the Safavids, who most probably referred to their emergence from the breakup of the Golden Horde.
