= Asmalyk =

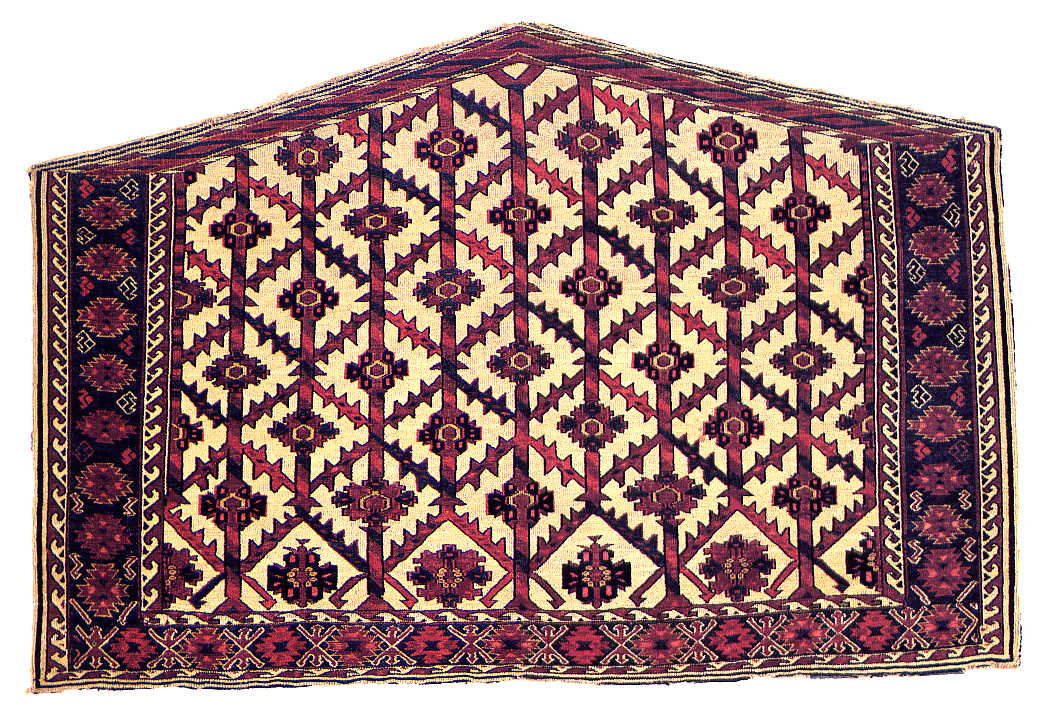
Yomut asmalyk, pile carpet, first half of 19th century

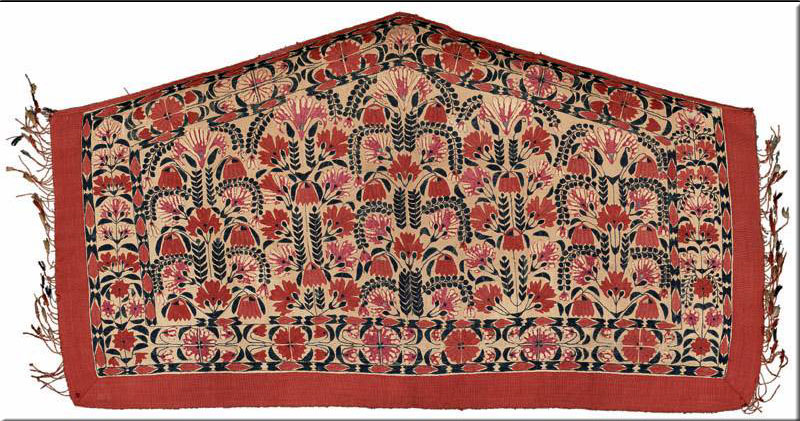
Tekke asmalyk, embroidered silk, mid-19th century

An asmalyk (Turkmen language, "a thing to be hung") is a textile trapping used in a Turkmen wedding procession. Asmalyks may be pile or embroidered, and are usually five-sided, but some are seven-sided. Yomut asmalyks are the most common, followed by those of the Tekke tribe. Asmalyks were made in pairs to decorate the flanks of a bride's wedding camel, and were then hung in her domed, felt-covered tent.
