= Salur (tribe) =

Ancient Oghuz Turkmen tribe

Salyr
- Tamga of the Salur

Regions with significant populations
- Turkey, Turkmenistan, Iran, China (Note: Salar people that live mostly in the Qinghai-Gansu border region, China.)

Languages
- Oghuz Turkic

Religion
- Islam

Related ethnic groups
- Oghuz Turks (Salyr Turkmens, Salar people)

Salur, Salyr or Salgur (Turkish: Salır, Turkmen: Salyr, سالؽر; Persian: سالور) was an ancient Oghuz Turkic (or Turkoman) tribe and a sub-branch of the Üçok tribal federation.

The medieval Karamanid principality in Anatolia belonged to the Karaman branch of the Salur. The Salghurids of Fars (Atabegs of Fars), were also a dynasty of Salur origin.

The patriarchs of the modern Turkmen tribe of the Salyr in Turkmenistan, Uzbekistan, Afghanistan, Iraq, and Iran, as well as the Salars of China, claim descent from the original Oghuz Salur.

== Etymology ==
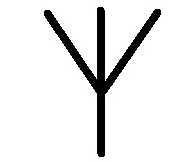
Tamga of the Salur tribe as per Abul-Ghazi's "Genealogy of the Turkmens"

Historian and statesman of the Ilkhanate, Rashid al-Din Hamadani, in his literary work Oghuzname, which is part of his extensive history book Jami' al-tawarikh (Compendium of Chronicles), writes that the name Salyr means “wherever you go, you fight with a sword and a club”. The khan of the Khanate of Khiva and simultaneously a historian, Abu al-Ghazi Bahadur, in his Shajara-i Tarākima (Genealogy of the Turkmens) expresses his belief that the meaning of the tribe's name is “armed with a saber”.

Turkologist Peter B. Golden believes the name comes from Salğur < sal- "to put into motion, violent motion," in Oghuz "to be aggressive, to hurl oneself into attack." Thus, this is a tribal name expressing military power, force and aggression. Such nomenclature may have appeared more in the medieval Turkic environment (e.g. Qiniq), as for personal names.

== History ==
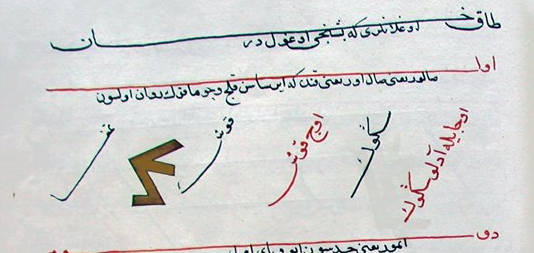
Tamga of Salur, Selçukname.

According to various versions of the Oghuz Turkic heroic epos Oghuzname, the Salyr tribe played an important role in the Oghuz Yabgu State up to the middle of the 10th century until the beginning of the Seljuk movement, and many Khans of this State were from the Salyrs. Rashid al-Din Hamadani wrote:

For a long time, royal dignity remained in the Oghuz family; for so long the dignity of the sovereign was in the ancestral branch of Salyr, and after that (from) other branches (also) there were revered kings.

Subsequently, the bulk of the Salyr tribe lived on the territory of Turkmenistan, a significant part of them in the 11th–12th centuries left along with other Oghuz-Turkmen tribes to the west; in Asia Minor they established the Salghurids State centered in Iraq in the 12th century, and supported other Turkmen beyliks in the reconstruction of Anatolia. The Salgurid Dynasty, which ruled in Fars in 1148-1282 and played an important role in the creation of the Sultanate of Rum, belonged to the Salyr tribe. Part of the tribe moved to Crimea, and the Crimean river Salgir, according to some scholars, owes its name to this tribe. In the 14th–16th centuries, the Salyr led the largest military-tribal association of five Turkmen tribes: Salyr, Arsary, Tekke, Yomud and Saryk. This military alliance existed until the waters of the Amu Darya stopped flowing along Uzboy watercourse. The Salyrs of Khorasan were known in the southern Turkmenistan. In the 16th–19th centuries, the Salyr Turkmen tribe lived in Mangyshlak peninsula and the area of Northern Balkan mountains of Turkmenistan, then in the Khiva Khanate, later in the middle reaches of the Amu Darya river, in the Murghab oasis and, finally, in Serakhs – the last place of their final settlement in 1884.

Salur Kazan, one of the heroes in Dede Korkut's epic tales, is also a Salurian. Some Salurs still live in the Middle East and Central Asia. Matthew Arnold's poem Sohrab and Rustum mentions the "lances of Salore" as a contingent of the Tartar army fighting the Persians.

== See also ==
- Oghuz traditional tribal organization
- Chepni, another Üçok tribe.

== Bibliography ==
- Leiser, G. (1995). "Salur". In Bosworth, C. E.; van Donzel, E.; Heinrichs, W. P. & Lecomte, G. (eds.). The Encyclopaedia of Islam, Second Edition. Volume VIII: Ned–Sam. Leiden: E. J. Brill. ISBN 978-90-04-09834-3.
