= Ovezmurat Dykma-Serdar =

Ovezmurat Dykma-Serdar (Russian: Овезмурад Дыкма Сердар; 1825–1882/84?, Turkmen: Öwezmyrat Dykma Serdar, عوض‌مراد دیقمه‌سردار) was a Teke Turkmen tribal leader in the second half of the 19th century. Originating from the Akhal region, the young Ovezmurat led armed raids (alaman) into the Persian provinces of Khorasan and Mazendaran. According to some reports, he was captured by the Shah's forces and held captive in Bojnurd prison in northeastern Iran. According to others, he was the commander of an armed detachment of Tekke tribesemen on behalf of the Khan of Khiva.

In the 1860s and 1870s, he took an active part in the military-political consolidation of the Teke clans and the final consolidation of the Teke hegemony in the Akhal and Merv oases in southern Turkmenistan. After the death of Nurberdy Khan, the chief leader of Akhal, Ovezmurat emerged as a key organizer of the armed resistance against the Russian expeditions of generals Nikolai Lomakin and Mikhail Skobelev. In 1879, on behalf of the Teke forces, he entered into negotiations with the advancing Russian troops and offered himself as a voluntary hostage. During his stay at the Russian camp, he studied the military organization, armament and deployment of enemy forces. He was one of the principal leaders of the ultimately failed defence of Geok-Tepe fortress.

The decisive defeat of the Turkmens by General Skobelev's troops marked a major milestone in Russia's conquest of Central Asia. Dykma-Serdar surrendered and swore allegiance to the House of Romanovs. In 1881, at the invitation of Tsar Alexander III, he visited Astrakhan, Moscow and St. Petersburg, where he was received by the emperor himself. He received the rank of major and was given a hereditary title. He was the father of Oraz Dykma-Serdar, one of the commanders of the Teke cavalry regiment in the Tsarist army.
