= Altyn Asyr Bazaar =

Largest market in Turkmenistan

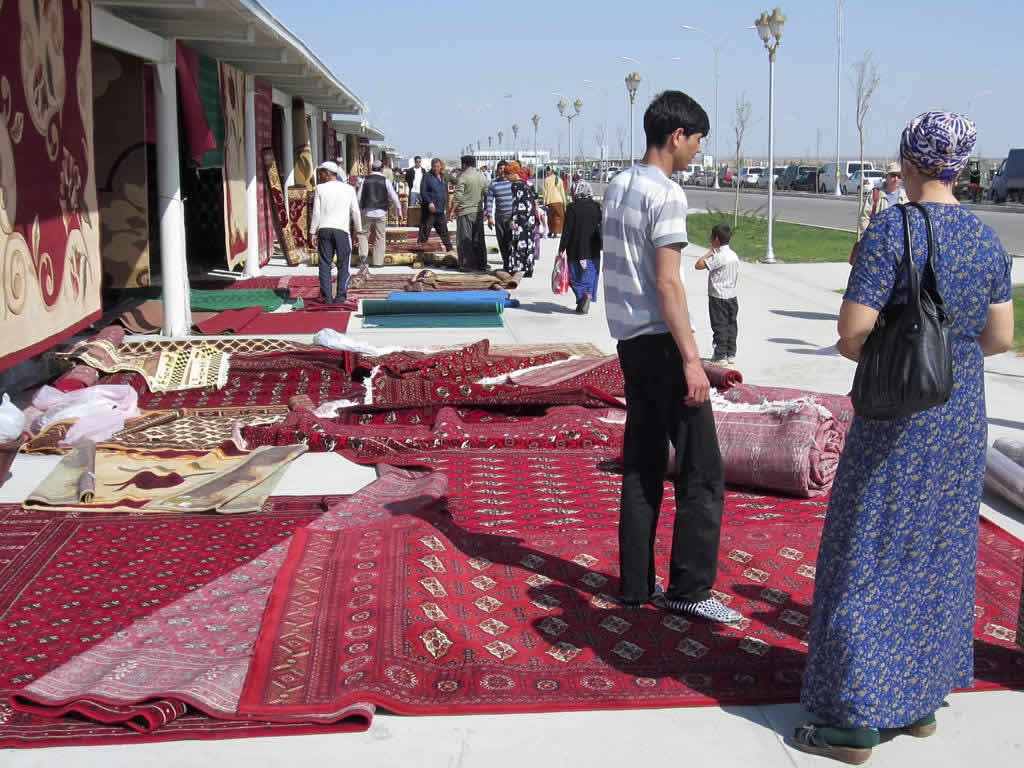
Sale of carpets on Altyn Asyr Bazaar

Oriental bazaar Altyn Asyr (Turkmen: Altyn Asyr gündogar bazary) also known locally as Täze jygyldyk (Russian: Новая Толкучка; New flea bazaar) is the largest market in Turkmenistan, and the fifth-largest in Central Asia. It is located in the outskirts of Ashgabat, in the residential area Choganly. It was built to resemble the shape a Turkmen carpet ornament of Ahal Province. The market covers 154 hectares. At the heart of the bazaar is a tall clock tower, its main landmark. There are 2,155 shops in the market.

== History and architecture ==
The origins of the Ashgabat flea market date back to the post-World War II Soviet era. At that time, the market, known as Jygyldyk in Turkmen and Tolkuchka in Russian, was held in the southern part of the city, near the former Podvoysky Street, (Note: The former Podvoysky Street is now named Bitarap Türkmenistan şaýoly.) which led toward the Kopet Dag hills, in the area known as Vosmushka or "8th of March".

Later, the flea market was relocated to the Khitrovka district, north of the railway line, in the vicinity of what were then Khalturin (Note: The former Khalturin Street is now named Geldi Bäşiýew köçesi.) and Sverdlov Streets. Subsequently, it was situated on Severnaya Street (Note: The former Severnaya Street is now named Artyk Jallyýew köçesi.), on the site of the later vegetable market known as Gündogar Bazary or Daýhan Bazary.

Before 1972, Tolkuchka was moved to the Choganly area near the Ashgabat airport, on the northern side of the Karakum Canal at the edge of the desert, and the market grounds were paved. (Note: The former location of Tolkuchka in the Choganly area was 38.000178°N 58.395739°E.) The market flourished in the 1990s, becoming known as a traditional Central Asian bazaar where hundreds of small-scale vendors sold various small goods and carpets, and camels wandered among the stalls. The Choganly flea market operated until 2011, when it was replaced by the Altyn Asyr Bazaar, located even further north. It opened on 15 February 2011 with the participation of the President of Turkmenistan Gurbanguly Berdimuhamedov.

The new market features unique architecture. The complex resembles a carpet pattern from a bird's eye view. The bazaar includes a hotel that can accommodate a hundred guests, and there are several cafes and bistros on the grounds.

In 2013 the market was equipped with telephone equipment and high-speed Internet.

== Photos of the demolished Tolkuchka bazaar ==
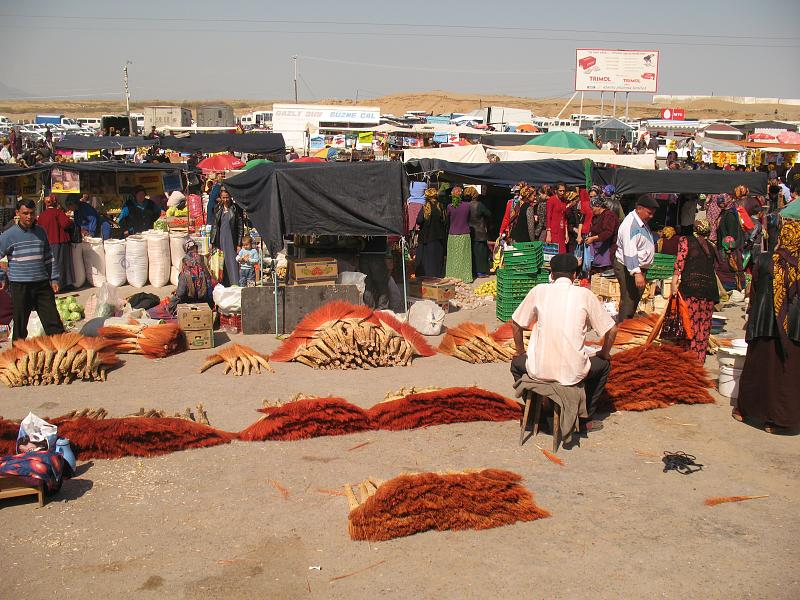

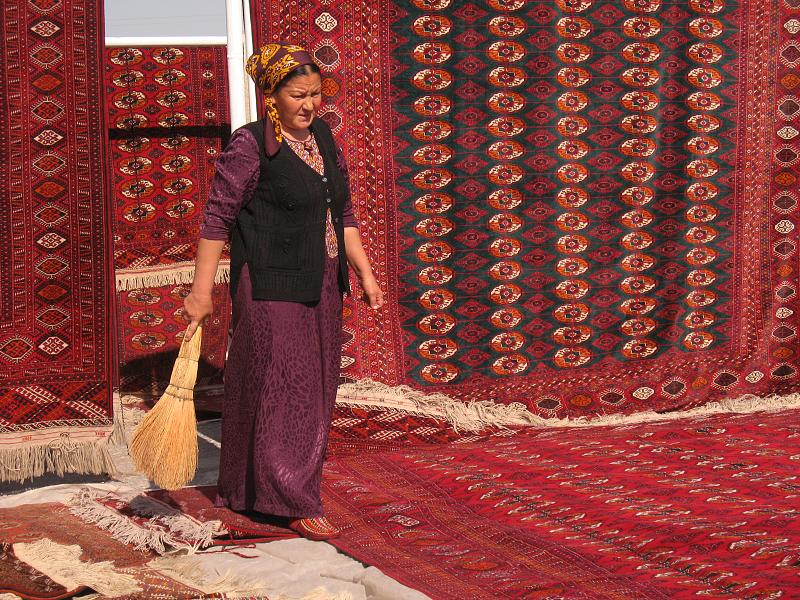

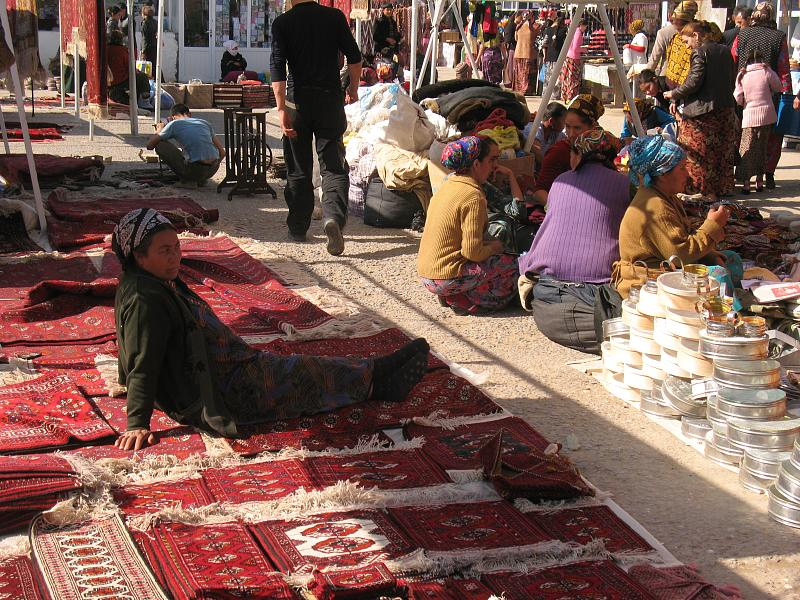

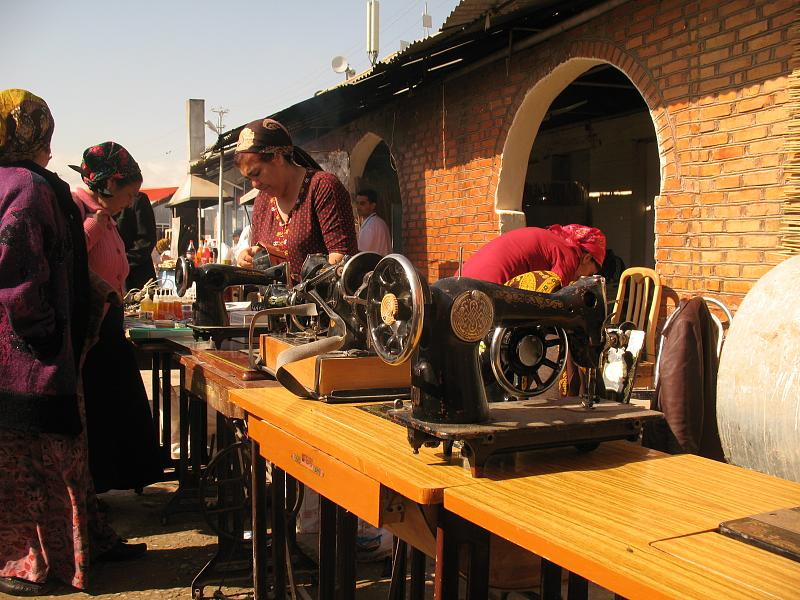

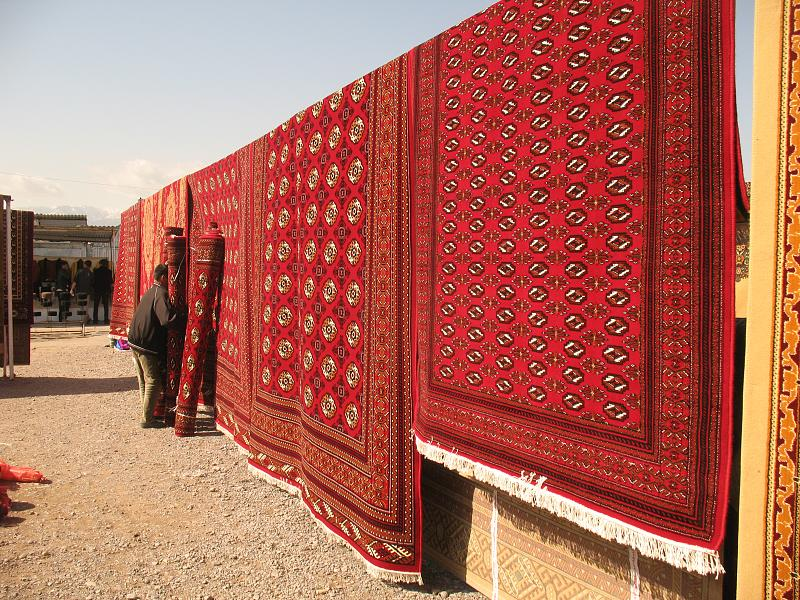

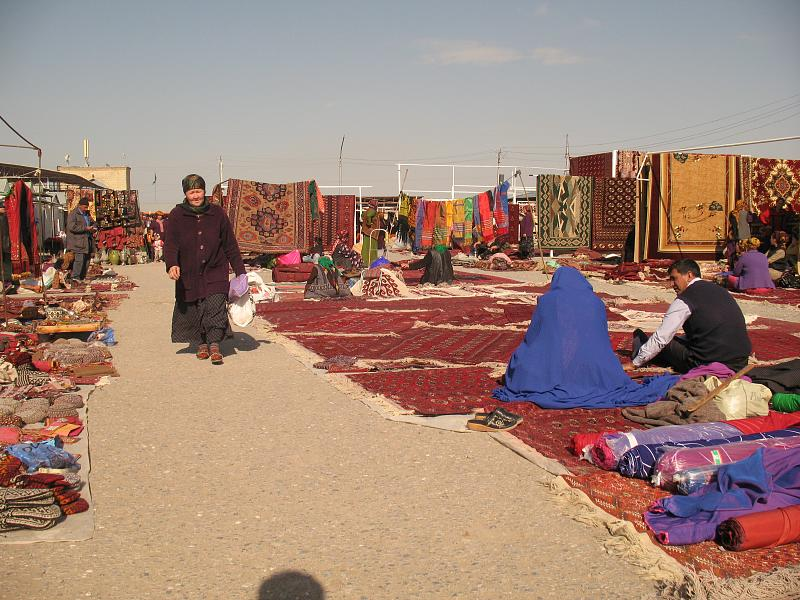

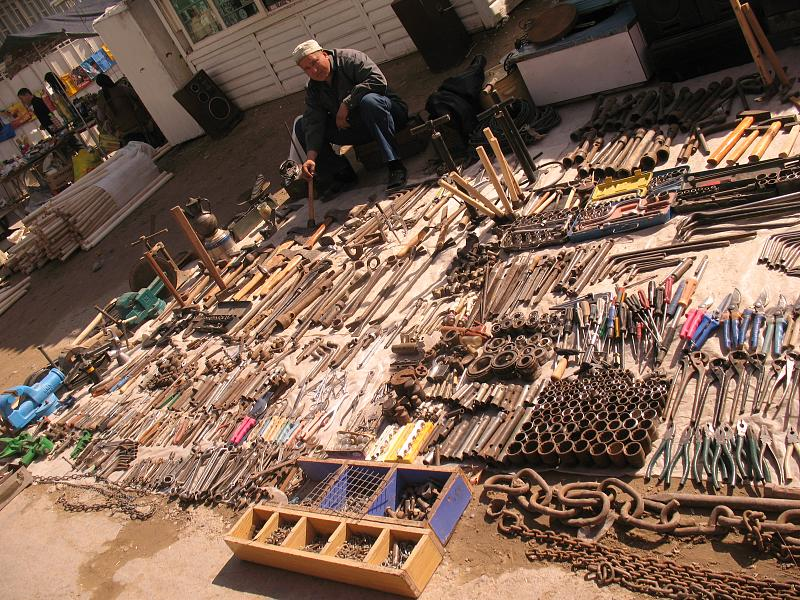

== See also ==
- Bazaar
- Market (place)
- Retail
- Souq
