= Yomut carpet =

Type of Turkmen rug

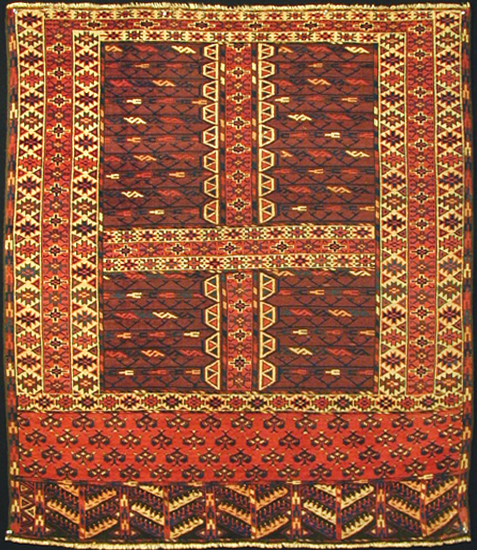
Mid 19th century - Yomut ensi (door hanging)

Yomut design on the Turkmen flag.

The Yomut carpet is a type of Turkmen rug traditionally handwoven by the Yomut or Yomud, one of the five major tribes of Turkmenistan. A Yomut design, along with designs from the other major tribes, is featured on the coat of arms and the flag of Turkmenistan.

== Design ==
Traditionally, the Yomut carpet uses gul motifs in different shapes and sizes. Commonly edged with florets, the Yomut carpet is noted by Britannica for its borders that usually follow a geometric vine design. Diamond-shaped motifs, attached by latch hooks, are also a common observation in the carpet. Britannica described its color pallet as ranging from a reddish brown to plum shades.

== See also ==
- Suzani rug
- Turkmen rug
- Tush kyiz
