= Saryk =

Turkmen tribe

Sarykly
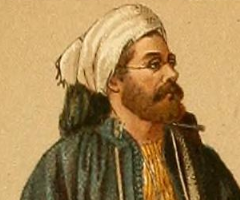
- Drawing of a Saryk man

Regions with significant populations
- Marghab Valley (Turkmenistan, Iran, Afghanistan)

Languages
- Turkmen (Saryq dialect), Dari

Religion
- Sunni Islam

Related ethnic groups
- Turkmens, Afghan Turkmens, Iranian Turkmens

The Saryk (Turkmen: Sarykly) are a tribe of Turkmens in Turkmenistan. The Saryk mostly live in the valley of the Marghab River (the ancient Margiana).

== Etymology ==
Suggestions for the etymology of Saryk (also Sarik, Saryq) are the Middle Turkic saryγ ("yellow") or the Kipchak root saryq ("sheep").

== History ==
In the early 19th century the Saryk lived in the Merv region, but from 1830 they were driven further up the Marghab valley by the Teke. Bala Murghab and the Panjdeh became their main settlements.

In 1881, the Saryk came under Russian control after the Battle of Geok Tepe and the creation of the Transcaspian Oblast. In 1885, the Saryk population was estimated at 65,000.

They continued under Russian rule through the Soviet period. Today most live in modern Turkmenistan, with some living over the borders in Iran and Afghanistan.

== Art and culture ==
Like other Turkmen tribes, the Saryk are known as carpet-makers and have their own distinctive style: dark red-brown carpets with the pattern picked out in fine, thin lines. They use a symmetrical (Turkish) knot, like the Yomut do. The Saryk are also famed for their jewellery.

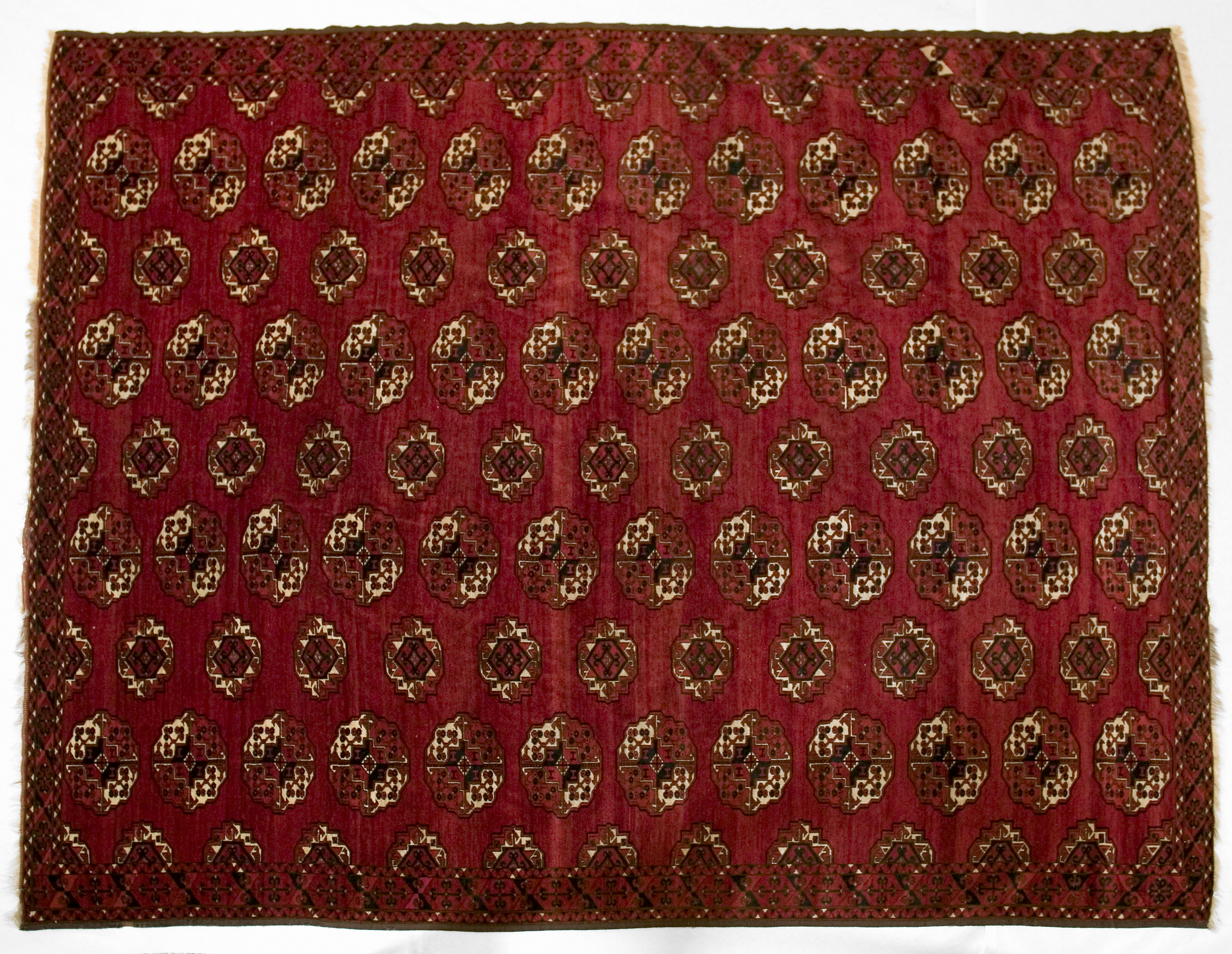
Saryk carpet, 19th century

Saryk carpet, 19th century

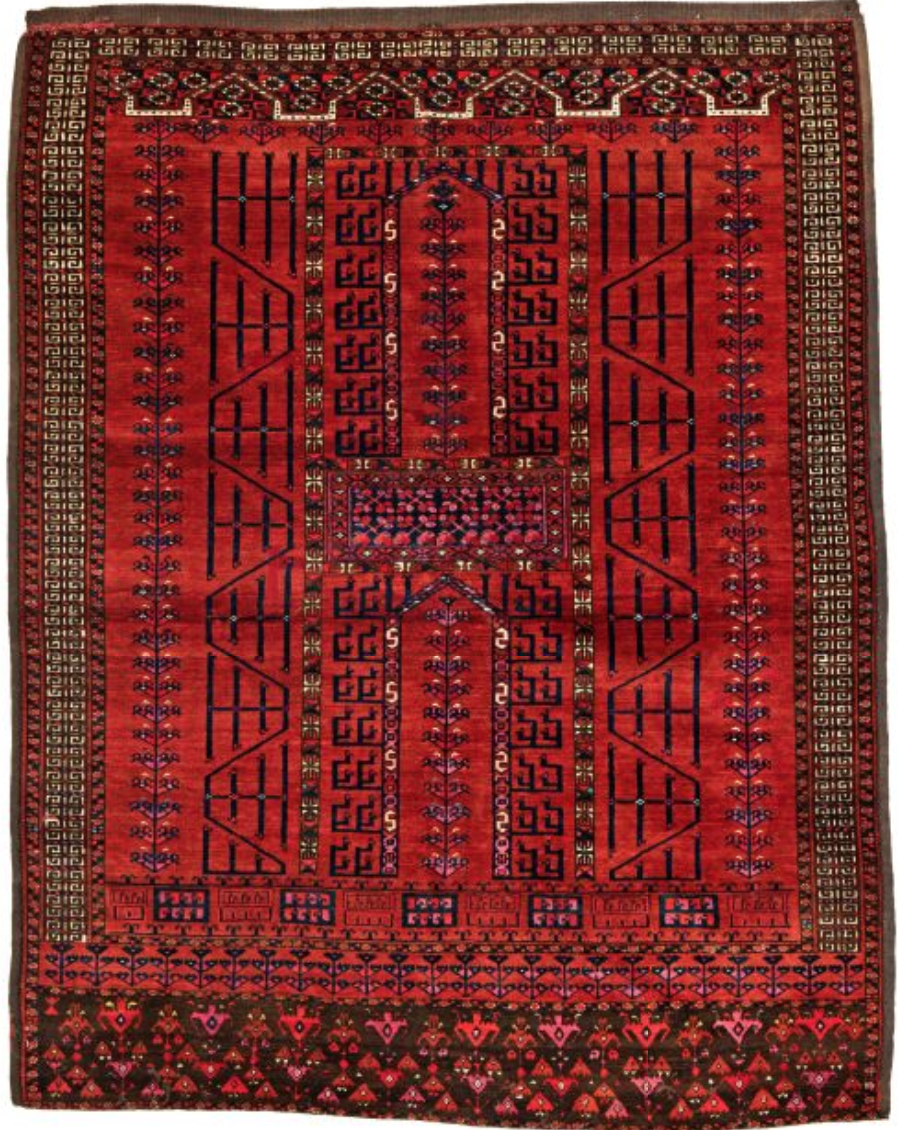
Siawosch Azadi Saryk Ensi. circa 18th century
