= Chowdur =

Turkmen tribe

Chowdur Çowdur
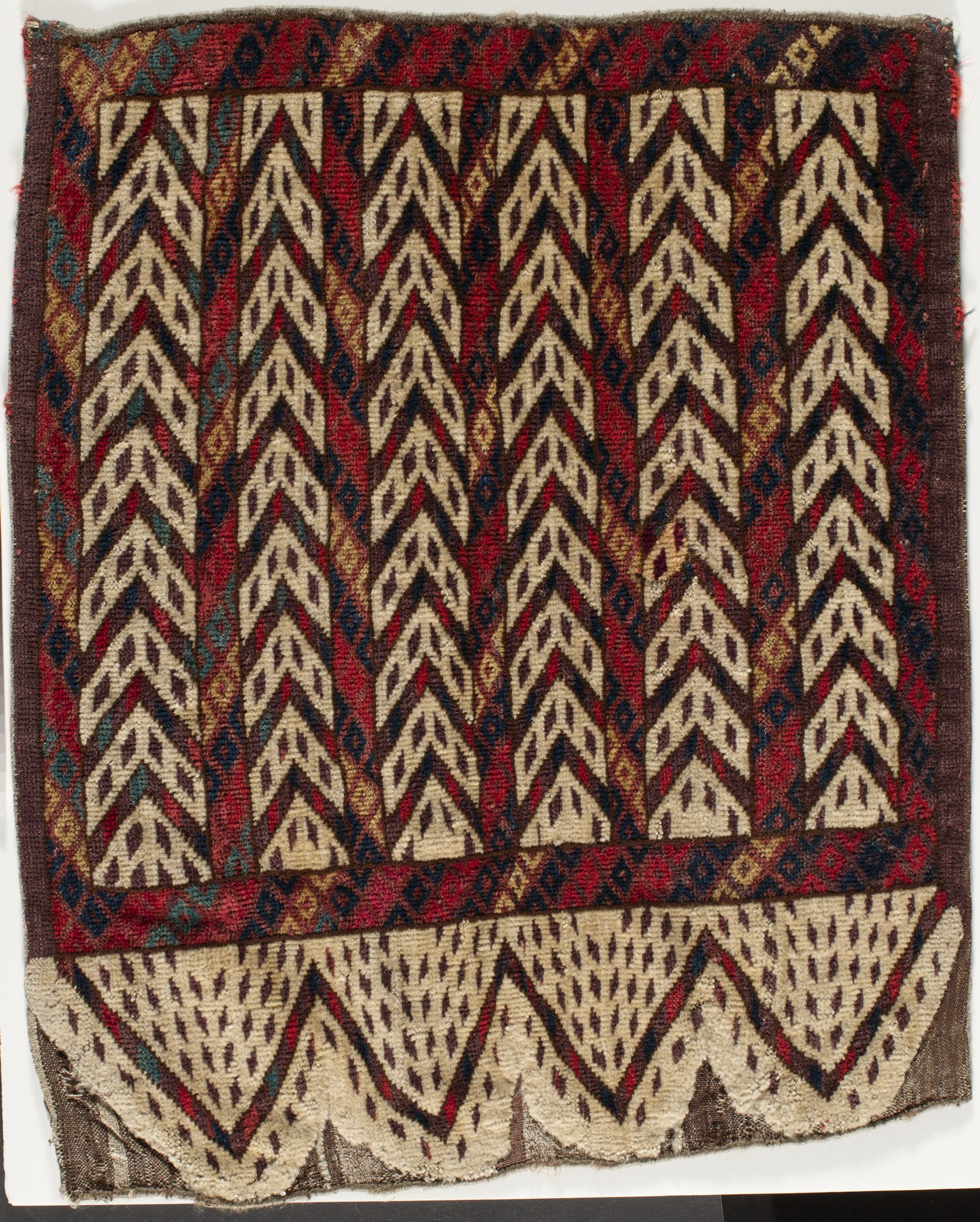
- A traditional Chowdur carpet from the early 19th century.
- Location: Turkmenistan, primarily Khwarazm
- Language: Turkmen
- Religion: Sunni Islam

Chowdur carpet design from the Turkmen flag

The Chowdur (meaning herder) or Choudor are one of the ten major groups of people who merged after 1920 to form the modern Turkmen Republic. They live primarily in and around the Khorezm Oasis.

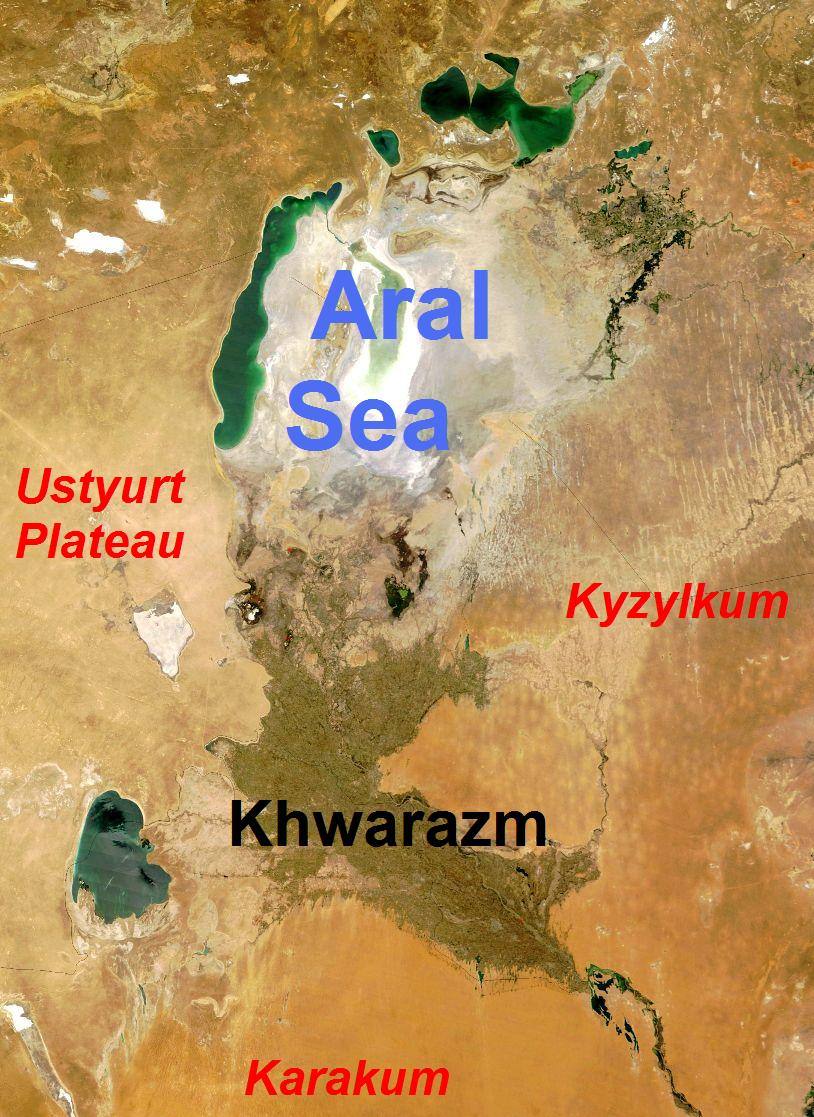
Satellite image showing the Aral Sea, Sarygamysh Lake (Dark lake in lower left corner), and the Khorezm Oasis (dark region).

== History ==
The Chowdur are thought to belong to the original Turkmen group and the left flank of Oghuz Khan's army.

They lived by the Caspian Sea since approximately the beginning of the second millennium. Abul Ghazi tells us they arrived in Mangyshlak as early as the 11th century. Prior to the rise of Toghrul Bek (the first Seljuk ruler, 1038 until 1063), many tribes followed the lead of their tribal leaders Kilik bek, Kazan bek and Karaman bek and settled in Mangyshlak. Most of them were members of the Imir, Dukur, Düker (Döger), Igdir, Chavuldur, Karkin, Salor or Agar (Ajar) tribes.

In 1219, the Mongols crushed the Khwarazm Shah and his Turkmen/Azeri allies. Two years later, in 1221, the Mongol conquest pushed the Oghuz tribes including the Chowdur from the Syr Dara region into the Kara Kum area and along the Caspian Sea.

Many Chowdur appear to have stayed on the Mangyshlak Peninsula from then through the Timurid and the Shaybanid Uzbek periods, beginning the Turco-Mongol transformation of these originally Oghuz people.

In the early 16th century, the Chowdur were a confederate or aymaq in the Salar Sayin Khani confederation. The Chowdur were primarily concentrated in the Mangyshlak Peninsula on the northeastern Caspian coast. The Kalmuks moved into the Mangyshlak Peninsula, the Sayin Khan confederation broke up and the Chowdur ended up southeast of Khiva loosely confederated, but under the authority of the Yomud. There are indications that some Chowdur ended up in the mid Amu Darya region near north of Charjui. Under the Khiva Khanate during the nineteenth century, Choudur included the Igdir, Bozachi, Abdal, and Arabachi tribes.

In 1743, the Yomud captured Khiva briefly and again in 1767, but that time they held it for three years. In 1770, the Muhammad Amin Inaq of the Qungrats, defeated the Yomuds and founded the Qungrat dynasty. Part and parcel of this was the breakup of the Yomud which gave the Chowdur autonomy from the Yomud, but still under the Khiva/Khwarezem Khans.

== Lifestyle ==
Turkmen living in the Murgab River delta (Margiana oasis) traditionally farmed and herded karakul and fat-tailed sheep with some goats. Camels were herded separately.

Herders (chovdur in Turkmen) covered an area around the oasis to the north. Each chovdur knew the wells, the temporary summer camps (yazlag) and the winter houses or camps (gyshlag) which were grouped in villages in the oasis. The gyshlags were all located in the cultivated areas, where herders could find late forage and reeds for shelters.

The Chowdur tribe, particularly those members who settled in Khorezm oasis' Kalinin district also speak the Chowdur dialect. It is considered one of the major dialects spoken in modern Turkmenistan along with Arsari, Goklen, Teke, Salir, Sarik, and Yomud.

== Sources ==
- Wixman. People of the USSR. p. 47
- Turkmen Reference Grammar P.18
