= Teke (tribe) =

Turkmen tribe in Turkmenistan

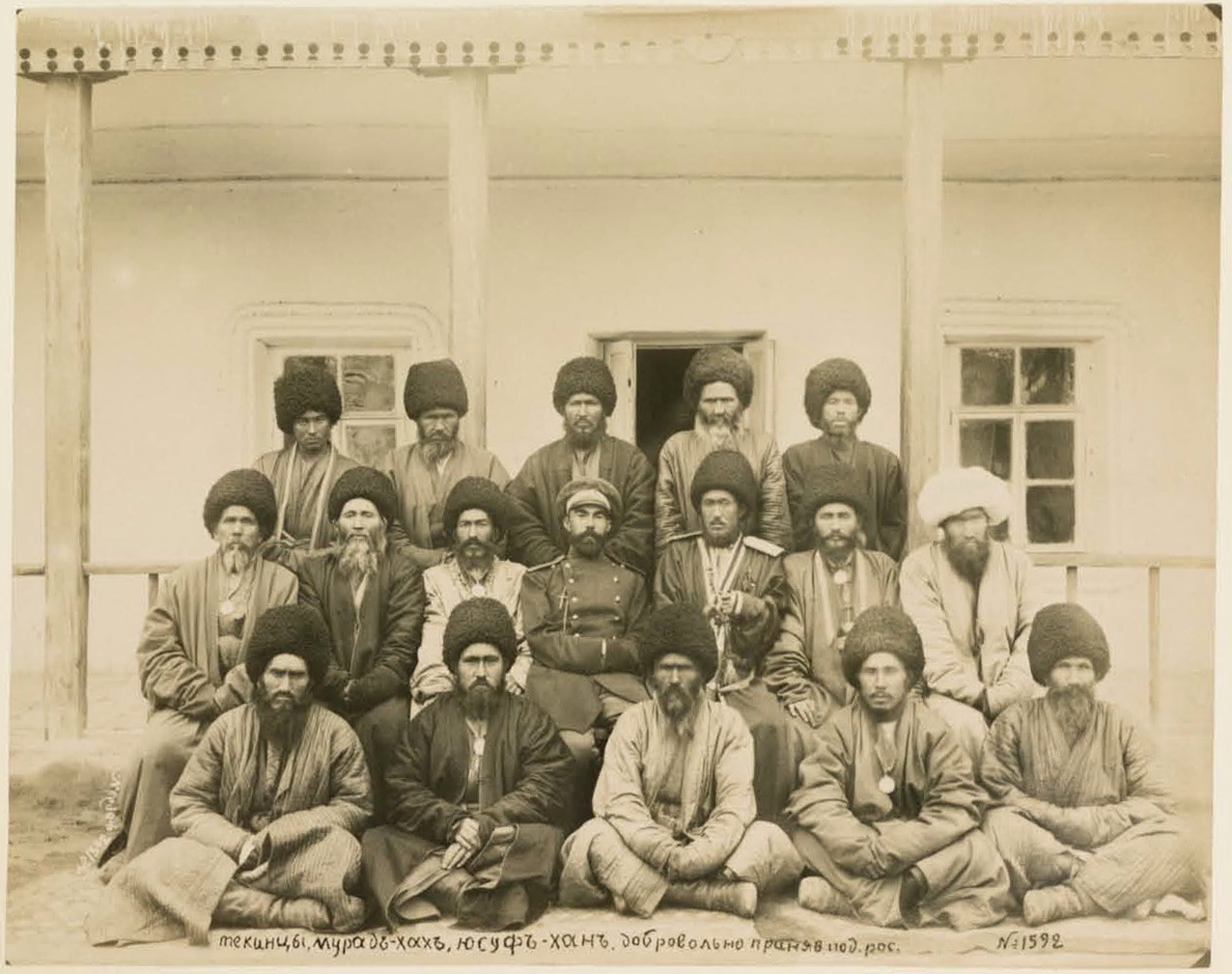
- A group of Teke men in 1888

Total population
- More than 1.6 million

Regions with significant populations
- Turkmenistan, Iran

Languages
- Turkmen

Religion
- Sunni Islam

Related ethnic groups
- Turkmen tribes

Teke is a major and politically influential tribe of Turkmens in Turkmenistan.

== History ==
The Oghuz forebears of the Teke migrated to Transoxiana in the 8th century. The tribe is called the Turka by explorer Alexander Burnes in his 1834 book Travels into Bokhara.

Lieutenant Colonel C.E. Stuart reported that in the 1830s the Teke tribe began to settle in the lower Murghab River delta near Merv, which, he said, they destroyed around 1855. From here the Teke extended their reach to Kizil-Arvat (the present-day city of Gyzylarbat), ultimately splitting into the Ahal Teke, located between Kizil-Arvat and Gäwers (an area Stuart called "Daman-i-Kuh"), and the Merv (today Mary) Teke, mainly between the Tejen and Murghab Rivers. Edmund O'Donovan described Merv as of 1881 as

...a heap of melancholy ruins. There are remains of baths, and palaces, and ramparts crumbling around, with nothing living but snakes and jackals to be seen, or perhaps some wandering Turkoman looking out for his sheep...This is all that remains of Merv...

O'Donovan also asserted that as of 1881

The Turkomans of Merv have only been twenty-six years in the oasis. They formerly inhabited the district around Sarakhs on the upper part of the Tejend river. They were driven from there twenty-seven years ago by the Persians, who objected to the neighbourhood of persons so disagreeable as to insist in carrying off Persian men, their wives, and daughters, and selling them at 5L per head in Bokhara.

The Ahal and Mary Teke were separated by a Persian-controlled zone north of the Kopetdag Mountains called Deregez. Though technically under Persian suzerainty, the Teke were de facto autonomous, and as O'Donovan remarked, were noted for raids to capture slaves for sale in the markets of Khiva and Bukhara. At one point the shah of Persia offered a reward of five tomans "for the head of each Turkoman killed raiding within his frontier." O'Donovan described to the Royal Geographical Society Mary Teke inhabitants of Mäne, a village in Deregez, as "nominally paying tribute to Persia, but who are really independent."

Sir Henry Rawlinson wrote of the Akhal Teke in 1879,

"The original settlement of the Akhal Tekeh, on the borders of Persia, was contemporaneous with that of the Merv Tekeh, of whom they are an integral portion. The whole tribe was brought from the 'Labáb', or banks of the Oxus...

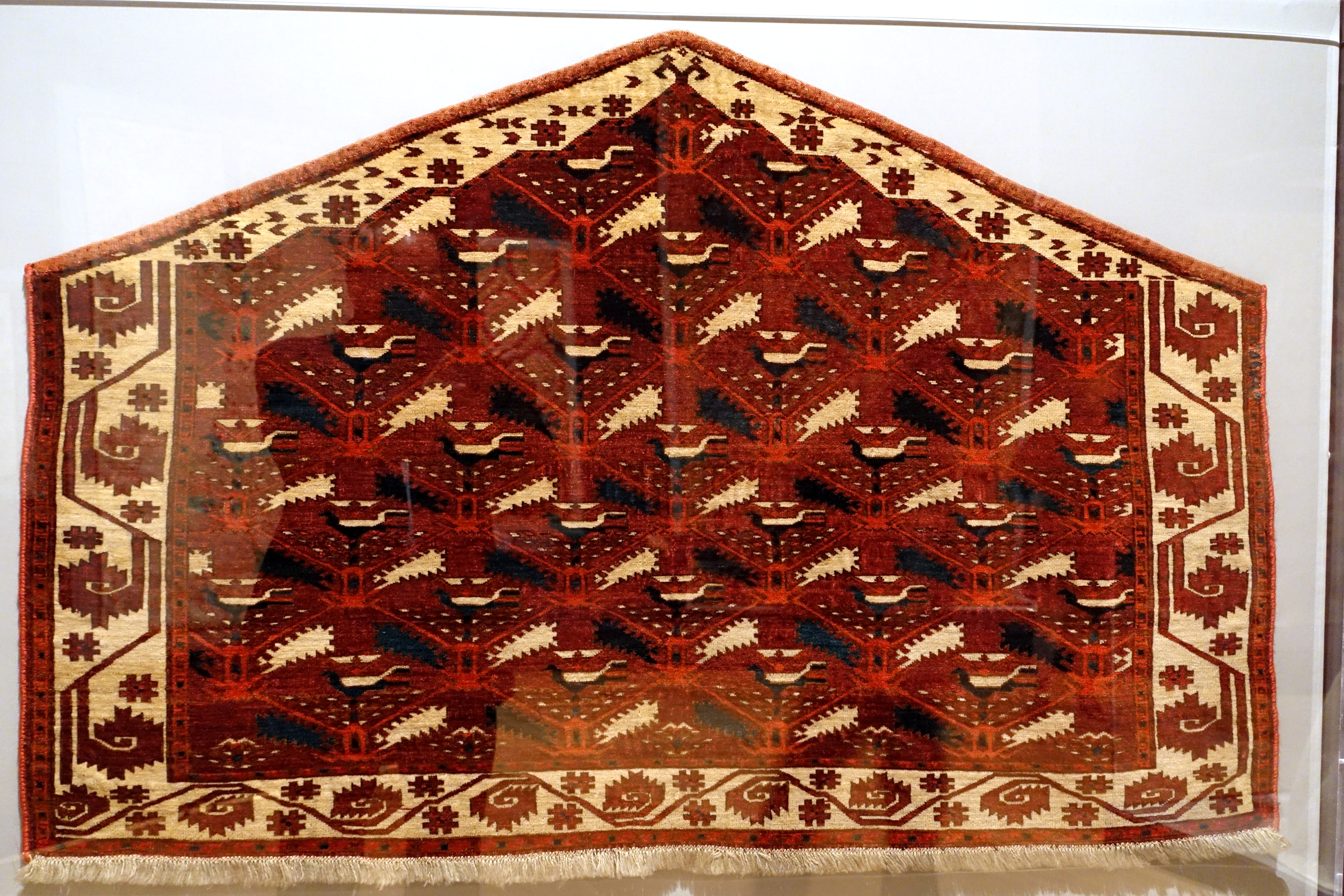
A Teke Turkmen rug

"The name 'Akhal'...is borrowed from one of their chief 'obahs,' or camps, near which are the ruins of a large Persian town and mounds of fire temples...the country occupied by the 'Akhal' consists of a strip of fertile land, varying from two or three to sixteen miles in width, and extending from Kizil-Arvat, about 160 miles...to Gawars, the most easterly settlement...

"The number of tents of families of the Akhal are variously computed, some estimates giving as high as 20,000. A comparison of Persian and Turcoman estimates...gives an average of about 8,000 tents, or 40,000 souls, which is probably very near the truth. One-fifth of this number must be adult males.

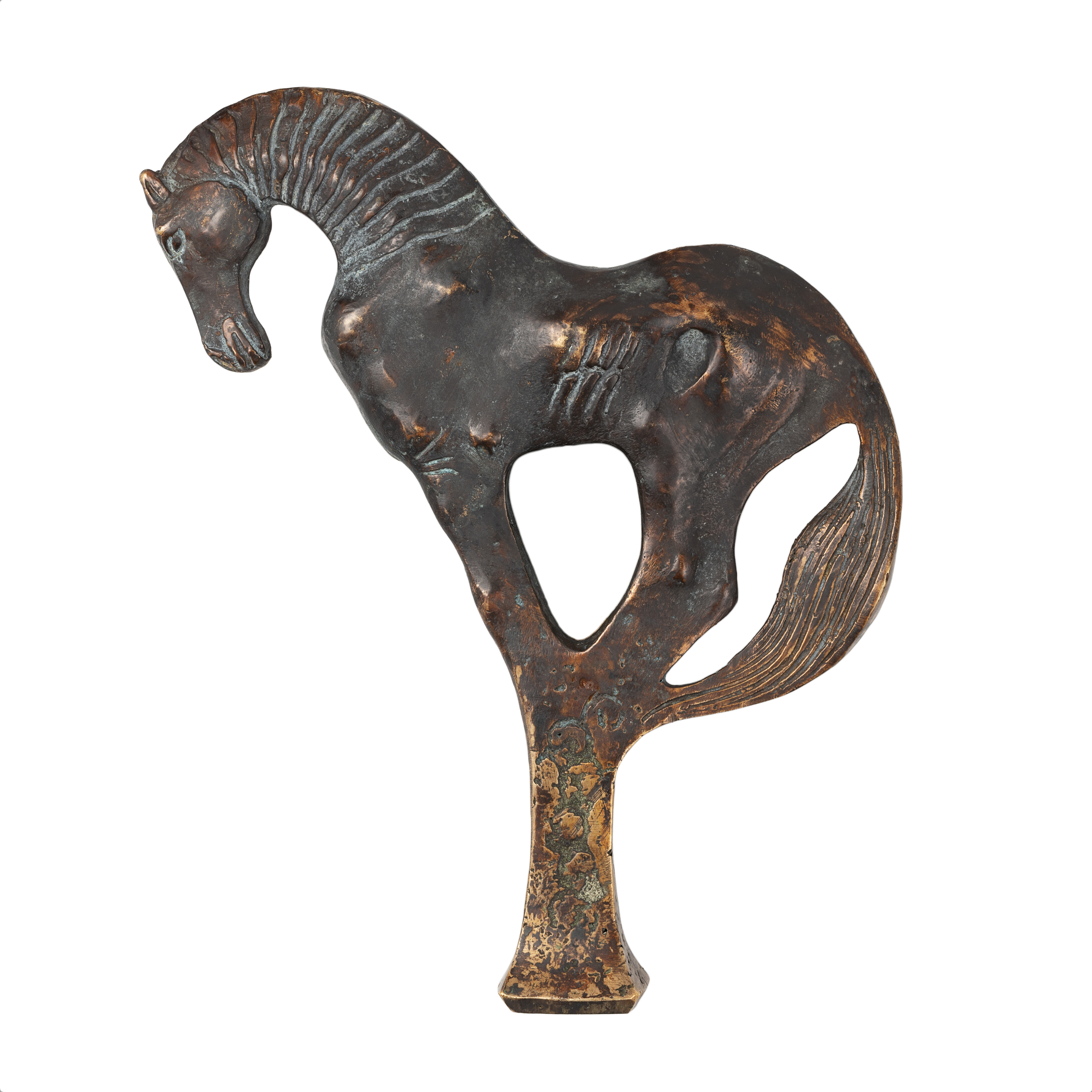
Ancient Turkmen Akhal-Teke horse, bronze, 4th-1st century BC.

"The principal settlements of the 'Akhal' are at Akhal, a permanent camp of 500 tents often increased to 1000 of various sections; Goombali, 1000 tents; Kariz, occupied only temporarily; Harrik-Kileh, Askabad, and Annau."

The Teke had militarily resisted Persian incursions in the 19th century intended to pacify them. The Teke came under Russian colonial rule in the 1880s. Though the Turkmen tribes defeated Russian troops during the first incursion in 1879, a subsequent invasion between 1880 and 1881, culminating in the second Battle of Gökdepe, resulted in imposition of Russian Imperial authority. Following surrender, the Teke commander, Ovezmurat Dykma-Serdar, was commissioned a major in the Russian Imperial Army. Russia's conquest of the Teke was completed in 1884 with the taking of Merv.

Following this conquest, the Teke were largely pacified and reverted from slave-trading to sheep-raising as the main source of income. A Russian diplomat, P.M. Lessar, reported that between December 1881 and April 1882, "a great change had taken place" and "it became possible to travel between Askhabad and Sarakhs without escort, accompanied by only a few labourers armed with guns against chance robbers."

== Culture ==
Historically each Turkmen tribe has had its own unique carpet pattern, clothing, headgear and dialect. Teke Turkmen carpets often feature a standard Teke rosette (Turkmen: göl), called the guşly göl, which in the words of O'Bannon "has the least variation of all Turkoman guls [sic] and has apparently changed least through time. This is the design which is also called Royal Bokhara...It is almost always connected by intersecting blue or black lines. It is an oval-shaped octagon, usually not more than four inches high and eight inches wide. The secondary gul is a diamond-shaped form and is sometimes referred to as a 'tarantula'."

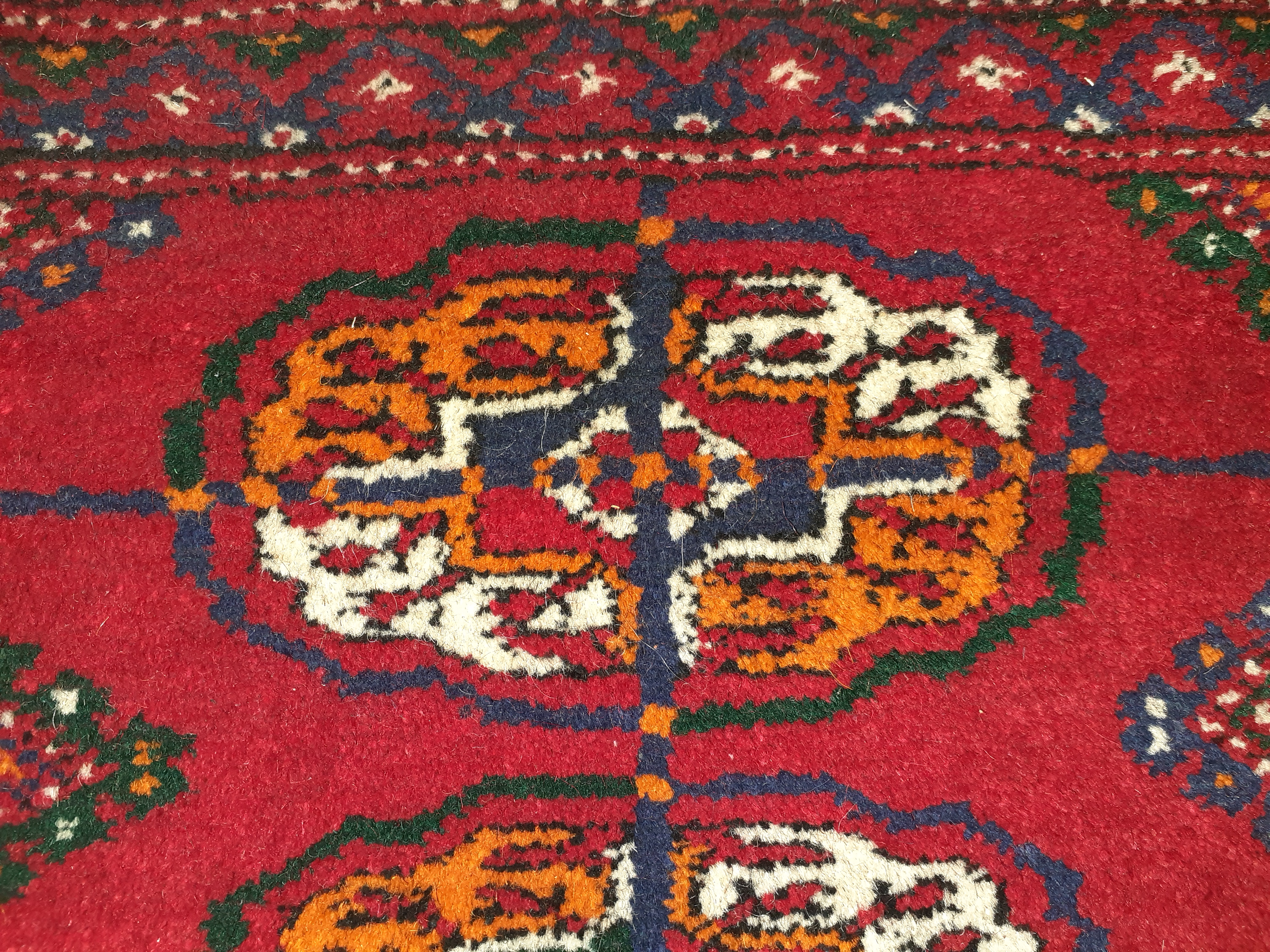
Typical Teke Turkmen rosette (göl) on a knotted carpet

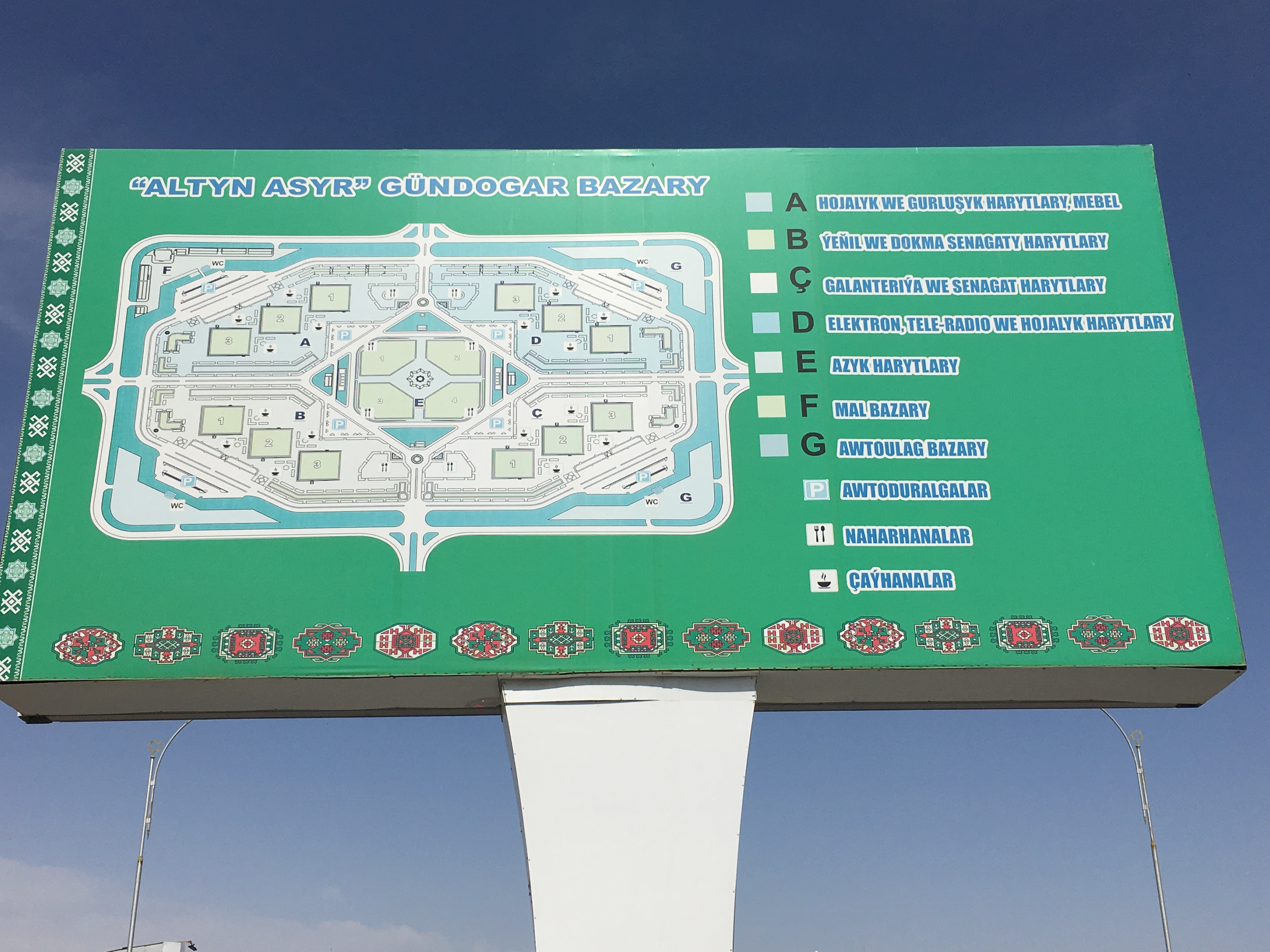
Photograph of a map of the Altyn Asyr Oriental Bazaar (Tolkuchka) in Ashgabat, Turkmenistan

National flag of Turkmenistan, featuring the five rosettes of the major tribes with the Teke rosette on top

The design of this rosette is reproduced in the layout of the Altyn Asyr bazaar in Ashgabat, and is the topmost rosette on Turkmenistan's national flag.

== Demographics ==
The Teke tribe can be subdivided in two, the Ahal Teke and Mary Teke. Lt. Col. Stuart noted as well subdivision into four clans, the Wakil (variant Wekil), Beg, Suchmuz, and Bukshi:

"The Wakil and Beg clans are collectively called Toctamish, as they are descended from a person of that name. The Suchmuz and Bukshi clans are collectively called Otamish..."

As of 1879 Russian military officers estimated the Ahal Teke population at "30,000 yurts", and that the Teke "were capable of fielding 50,000 armed men, of whom 20,000 were cavalry and the rest were infantry." The main body of Teke were located between Geok-Tepe and "Askhabad", with two villages east of that, Anau and Gäwers. Combined population of the main body was estimated at 40,000 to 50,000 people, and the Russian commander believed "capture of this area meant the mastery of the entire Ahal-Teke oasis."

Stuart estimated in 1881 the number of "Akhal Tekke" at "25,000 tents" and of "Merv Tekke" at "40,000 tents", which latter number included "Salor (5000 tents)". He estimated five people per tent, implying a total Teke tribal population of about 325,000 in that year.

Today members of Teke tribe are predominantly found in the southeastern regions of Turkmenistan. They represent over a third of Turkmenistan's population (more than 1.6 million, as of 2014). Major tribes of Turkmenistan have mainly settled different parts of the country.

Soviet policy on nationalities managed to diminish tribal identities in Turkmenistan, but the identities are still important in contemporary social contexts. Teke, and especially its subdivision Ahal Teke, have traditionally dominated Turkmenistan's political structure. Former Presidents Saparmurat Niyazov and Gurbanguly Berdimuhamedow and current President Serdar Berdimuhamedow were or are of the Ahal Teke tribe.

== Linguistics ==
The linguist Larry Clark wrote,

"Teke dialect [is] spoken by members of the Teke tribe settled in the southern regions of Turkmenistan and along the northern skirt of the Köpetdag mountains, from Gizilarbat to the banks of the Murgap and Tejen rivers. This dialect has two subdialects:

(a) Ahal: Tejen and Ashgabat districts up to Gizilarbat, including Büzmeyin, Gökdepe, Bäherdin, Bami and Goch districts.
(b) Mari: Mari, Türkmengala, Sakarchäge, Murgap and Bayramali districts."

The official Turkmen language is based on the Ahal Teke and Mary Teke dialects. Stuart wrote in 1881, "The Turkomans speak a variety of Turki differing very little from the Turki spoken all over Northern Persia, and the Turks of Persia understand it, though there are some differences. The Persians call the Turki spoken by the Turkmans, Jagatai." The common use of Chagatay as the Turkic lingua franca of Central Asia, however, changed under Soviet rule in 1924 when Russian became the common literary language of Central Asia and local dialects of Turkic languages were allowed to be used in publications.

Initial efforts in the late 1920s and early 1930s to create a common literary Turkmen language incorporating elements of all major dialects failed when Joseph Stalin's purges resulted in death of the intellectuals involved. Following independence the political dominance of the Teke tribe led to de facto adoption of the Teke dialect as the standard for literary Turkmen speech and writing. As Clark put it,

"Standard Turkmen is regarded as their national language by all Turkmen living within Turkmenistan and, according to many Turkmen, by at least some of those living in nearby countries as well. This partly abstract standard language stands closest to the real language of the Teke dialect, and specifically of its Ahal subdialect spoken in the Ashgabat region, because many of the specialists who formulated the standard language in the 1930s were Ahal Teke, and the majority of officials, businessmen and intellectuals who routinely use the standard language, are Ahal Teke or live in Ashgabat."

== Etymology ==
Stuart asserted, "Tekke means wild goat. The word Tekke also is applied to the old he-goat that leads a flock of goats." The modern definition of the word is "billy goat".

== See also ==
- Akhal-Teke
- Kibitka
- Teke Peninsula
- Beylik of Teke
