= Ersari =

Tribe of Turkmen people

Ersari Ärsary
- Tribe
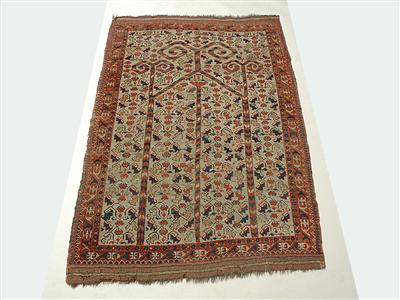
- Ethnicity: Turkmen
- Location: Central Asia
- Population: 2.1 million
- Branches: Four

Ersari (Turkmen: Ärsary, where Er - brave man, master; sari - light, bright, yellow) are one of the major tribes of the Turkmen people of Central Asia and one of the five major tribes of the country of Turkmenistan. They live mainly in Turkmenistan, Afghanistan and Pakistan.

== Population ==
Ersari people's number is approximately 2.1 million people overall (1 million in Turkmenistan, 1,5 million in Afghanistan.Turkey, Iran, Great Britain, Saudi Arabia, United Arab Emirates, Russia and other countries). Ersari has four sub-tribal divisions. They are: Gara, Bekeul, Gunesh and Uludepe.

== History ==
=== Origin ===
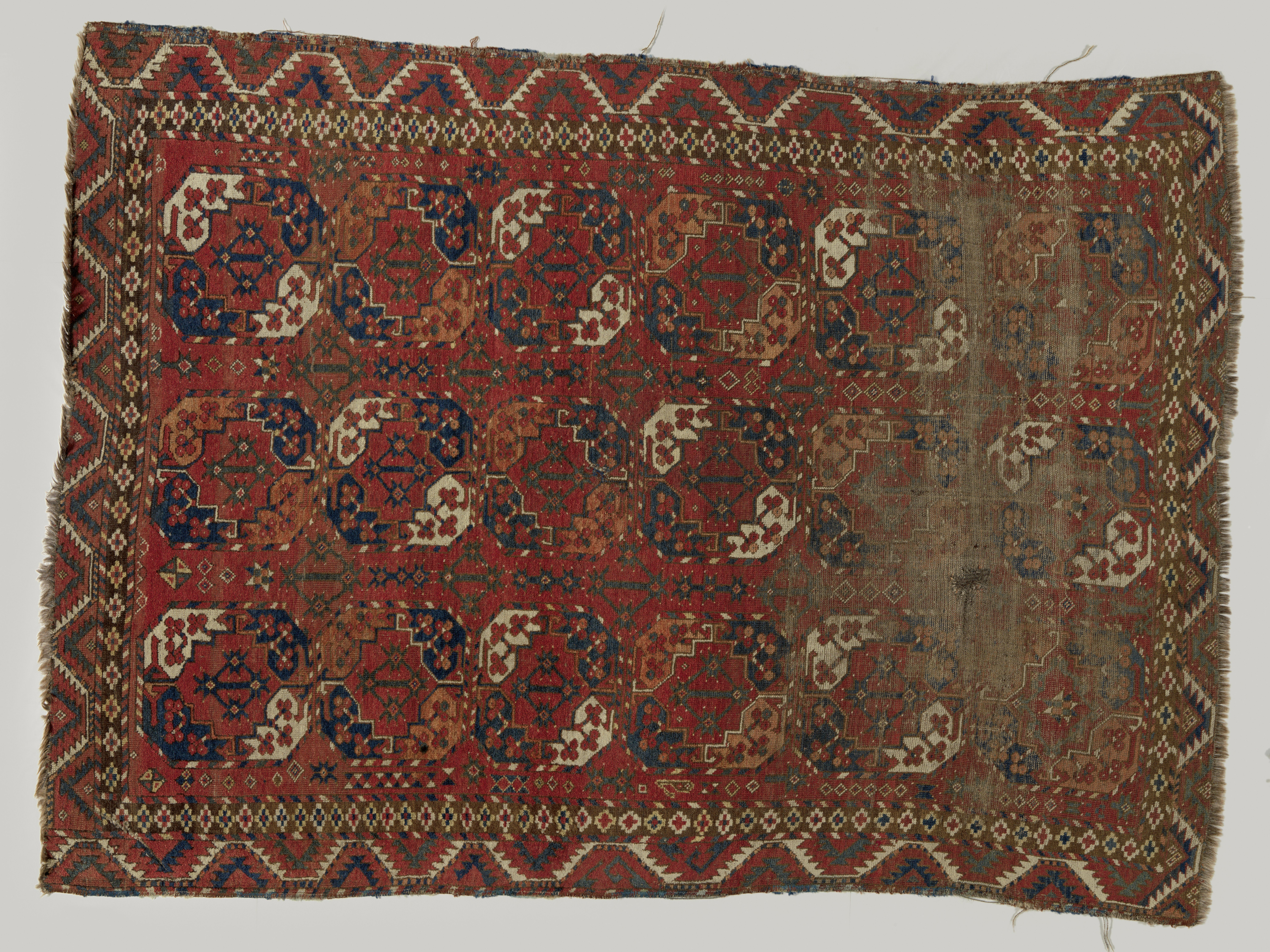
Ersari carpet, early 19th century

Ersari gul (pattern) as depicted on the Turkmen flag and arms

Ersari are direct descendants of the Oghuz Turks. It is believed that they come from the Salur tribe of the Oghuz Turks, just as Turkmen Yomud tribe. The Seljuk Turkomans, the conquerors of Iran and Turkey, are also considered as the forefathers of the Ersari.

=== Sayin Khan Turkmen tribal confederacy ===
Ersari appear to have been major component of the Sayin Khan Turkmen tribal confederacy whose Yurt (nomadic territory), in the late 13th, 14th, 15th, 16th and 17th centuries, stretched from the Balkan mountains to the Mangishlaq peninsula and north to the Emba river. The label Sayin Khani, given to these Turkmen by the other peoples around, referred to their emergence from the breakup of the Golden Horde, (founded by Genghis Khan's grandson Batu, known as the Sayin Khan), in order to differentiate their origins from tribes that came from the territories of Hulegu (Iran) or Chaghatay (Trans-Oxanian Central Asia).

The Sayin Khani Turkmens appear to have been an organized confederation of tribes said to be divided, in typical Turco-Mongol fashion, into two parts, the Ichki (inner) and Tashki (outer) Oghuz. Abu al-Ghazi Bahadur, the Uzbek Khan of Khiva in the 17th century, in his book Shajara-i Tarākima ("The Genealogical Tree of the Turkmen", 1659) does not indicate whether the term Tashki refers to an organizational, military or purely geographical meaning. Sometime in the 17th century, in part to the drying up of the western Uzboy channel of the Amu Darya, the Ersari and its major subtribes moved east to the banks of the main course of the Amudarya. One sub-tribe, the Ali-Eli also moved eastwards, but remained near Kaka region, which is now in Ahal Province of Turkmenistan.

=== Ersari baba ===
Ersari baba is the legendary leader of Ersari people, and of all Turkmen, who lived in the 13-14th centuries in Mangishlaq (Mangystau Province) and Balkan mountains (Balkan Province). He had been the founder of the Sayin Khan Turkmen confederation and considered to be father of Ersari people. He assembled all Turkmens, those that remained in Central Asia after the Mongol invasion of Central Asia. He played a leading role in consolidation of Turkmen tribes at that arduous period in Central Asia.
