= List of rivers of Turkmenistan =

Turkmenistan has four major rivers, the Atrek (Turkmen: Etrek), Amu Darya (Turkmen: Amyderýa), Murghab (Turkmen: Murgap), and Tejen. Turkmenistan has approximately 3,000 rivers, but the vast bulk of them are shorter than 10 kilometers in length, and all but 40 of them are seasonal.

The following list of major rivers of Turkmenistan is arranged geographically by river basin. All of the country's rivers flow into endorheic basins; none drains to an ocean.

== Caspian Sea ==
- Atrek River (Turkmen: Etrek)
  - Sumbar (Sary-suw)
  - Chandyr River
- Uzboy (extinct) (Turkmen: Uzboý) - a former distributary of the Amu Darya

== Karakum Desert ==
- Tejen River (Harirud) - now flows into the Karakum Canal
- Murghab River
  - Kushk River (Turkmen: Guşgy)
  - Kashkan River (Turkmen: Kaşan)

== Aral Sea basin ==
- Amu Darya (Turkmen: Amyderýa)

== Descriptions ==
The Amu Darya is Turkmenistan's largest and heaviest flowing river. One-thousand kilometers of its 1,415-kilometer length flows through Turkmenistan. It is the primary water source for the Karakum Canal. The Murghab River, Turkmenistan's second-largest, is 978 kilometers in length, with 530 kilometers of that in Turkmenistan. Northwest of the city of Mary the Murghab disappears into the Karakum Desert.The Tejen River is the third largest, and it has been diverted to flow into the Karakum Canal. The Atrek River rises in the Khorasan Mountains of Iran and sixty percent of its flow occurs in spring and winter. The Atrek's major tributaries are the Sumbar and Chandyr Rivers.

Over 140 small rivers and springs flow from the Kopet Dag mountain range to the north. The largest of them are the Begmyrat, Gamisuv, Ashgabat, Garasuv, Altyap, Sekizyap, Archman, Chachechay, Manechay, Artyk, Sunche, Borme, Bamy, Goch, and Gyzylarbat rivers.

References in Turkmenistan to the so-called "Garagum River" are to the Karakum Canal (viz.), which is not a true river, but an artificial, man-made canal.
