= Memorial Day (Turkmenistan) =

Public holiday in Turkmenistan

The Memorial Day (Turkmen: ýatlama güni) is an official holiday of Turkmenistan, commemorated on 12 January. It honors those who fell on 12 January 1881 defending the Geok Tepe fortress against the Russian troops. It is one of two mourning days in Turkmenistan (the other being Day of Remembrance). The country has marked Memorial Day since its independence in 1991 in commemoration of all those who gave their lives. The holiday is celebrated as a national day of mourning, with the resistance often being cited as a source of national pride.

National flags are traditionally lowered in the capital of Ashgabat as well as in the Provinces of Turkmenistan. Funeral prayers are performed in mosques, the largest of which is held at Saparmurat Hajji Mosque. According to tradition, the main public prayer as well as a national memorial service (with the President of Turkmenistan in attendance) is held in Goktepe, at the mosque standing on the site of the Battle of Geok Tepe. Ritual meals are offered all over the country. It is also a non-working holiday.
