= Sari-su =

Sari-su, Sary-su. Sara-su, Sarısu, Sarisu, Sarysu, or Ṣáríṣú, the name means yellow water in Turkic languages, may refer to:

== Azerbaijan ==
- Lake Sarysu, Azerbaijan's largest lake
- Sarısu, Beylagan, a village and municipality in Beylagan Rayon
- Sarısu, Goygol, a village and municipality in Goygol Rayon
- Sarısu, Imishli, a village in Imishli Rayon

== Crimea ==
- Sary-su (Alma), a tributary of the Alma River

== Iran ==
- Sari Su, Iran, a village in the Central District of Poldasht County, West Azerbaijan province
- Sari Su Rural District, Maku County, West Azerbaijan province

== Kazakhstan ==
- Sarysu (river), in Kazakhstan
  - Zhaman Sarysu, a tributary of the Sarysu in Kazakhstan
- Sarysu District, Kazakhstan

== Russia ==
- Volga River, in Russia

== Turkmenistan ==
- Sumbar River, in southern Turkmenistan

== Turkey ==
- Sarısu, Kahta, a village in the District of Kahta, Adıyaman Province
- Sarısu, Çubuk, a village in the District of Çubuk, Ankara Province
- Sarısu, Kiraz, a village in the District of Kiraz, İzmir Province; see List of populated places in İzmir Province
