= Battle of Geok Tepe (1879) =

Battle between the Russian Empire and Turkmens

- Part of Russian conquest of Central Asia
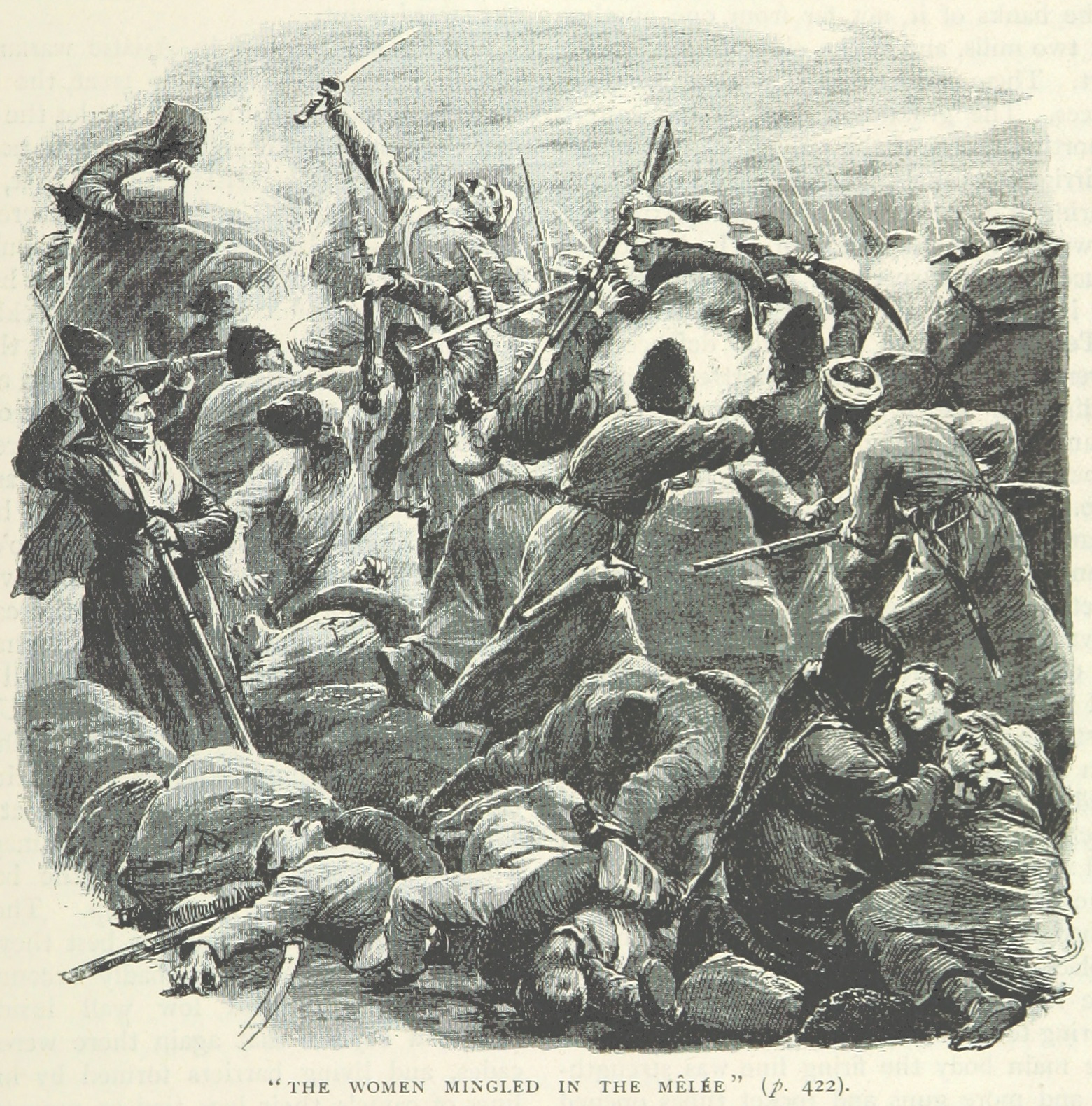
- Battle of Geok Tepe 1879
Date	9 September 1879
Location	Geok Tepe, Turkmenistan
Result	Turkmen victory: Russian invasion of Turkmenistan repelled

Belligerents
Akhal Teke Turkmens	Russian Empire

Commanders and leaders
Berdi Murad Khan †; Kara Bateer †	(Russian Empire) Nikolai Lomakin

Strength
About half the population of the tribe sheltered in the fortress; about 20,000 people	3,800 troops

Casualties and losses
2,000+ killed 2,000+ wounded	~200 killed 250+ wounded

The First Battle of Geok Tepe was the main event in the 1879 Russian expedition against the Akhal Tekke Turkmens during the Russian conquest of Turkestan. Nikolai Lomakin marched 442 km to the Geok Tepe fortress, but mismanaged the attack and was forced to retreat. The next year, this was reversed by Mikhail Skobelev in the second Battle of Geok Tepe.

Turkmen campaign of 1879
Blue = Russian fort.
(Khoja Kale is the mark south of Kazil Arvat.)
The Kopet Dagh Mountains run from Ashkabad northwest toward Krasnovodsk.

== Geography and background ==
After Russia subdued the Emirate of Bukhara in 1868 and the Khanate of Khiva in 1873 the Turkoman desert nomads remained independent. Their country was bounded by the Caspian Sea on the west, the Oxus River on the east and the ill-defined Persian border on the south. Near the center the Kopet Dag mountains ran northwest almost to Krasnovodsk Gulf. On their north side streams ran down from the mountains forming the Akhal Oasis which, in the broadest sense, ran from Kazil Arbat to beyond Askabad. The Tekke Turkomans who lived here were one of the few Turkoman tribes who practiced agriculture. Before and after the conquest of Khiva expeditions were sent into the Turkoman country to map the area and find the waterholes that would be needed by any significant army. In the spring of 1878 Lomakin was driven back from Kazil Arvat and that fall he crossed the Kopet Dag and was chased all the way back to Chikishlyar. These defeats had to be avenged, if only as a matter of prestige.

== Buildup ==
General Lazerev was given command, replacing the unsuccessful Lomakin. He assembled 18000 men and 6000 camels at Chikishlyar. He planned to march northeast through the desert along the Atrek and Sumbar Rivers and establish a large supply base in the mountain valley of Khoja Kale before crossing the Kopet Dagh to conquer Akhal and possibly Merv. The distance was 344 km to the mountain pass and then 117 km southeast along the oasis to Geok Tepe. Because Chikishlyar was a beach and not a harbor, landing supplies was slow. The place was unhealthy and this was the worst time of the year to march in the desert. It was difficult to find enough water and fodder for such a large force. One of the civilians who supported the army was a Mademoiselle Pauline who accompanied the troops all the way to Akhal and earned 4000 rubles during the campaign.

== Advance, disaster and retreat ==
They moved out in groups between June 18 and August 11. Near the end of July Lazerev grew ill. He insisted on following the troops and died at Chat in late August. Lomakin took command as the senior officer. Instead of building Lazarev's supply base, Lomakin decided to push on with the 3800 men he had. On September 4 they crossed the mountains near Bamy with only two weeks of supplies and marched southeast through deserted villages. By September 8 he was 13 miles from Denghil Tepe, as the fortress of Geok Tepe was called. Next morning he surrounded the place and began a bombardment. The fort held 15000 defenders and 5000 women and children, densely packed. The bombardment was terrible because they were using explosive shells instead of cannonballs. A standard practice was to leave one side of a siege line open so that the women and children could flee and that demoralized soldiers could run away to be cut down by cavalry. At 3pm the main force joined Lomakin's advance guard. At about 4pm the Tekkes sent negotiators. Both women and envoys were driven back into the fort. At 5pm Lomakin ordered a storm even though he had only 1400 infantry and had not brought scaling ladders. Instead of concentrating his soldiers at one point he spread them out in a thin line which was cut down before reaching the wall. The few Russians who crossed the first wall were stopped by the second wall.Thousands of Turkmen jumped from the walls and attacked the Russians. When the Russians retreated they were followed by a mob of Tekkes who were only stopped by artillery. During the battle, a cannonball hit the Turkmen commander Berdi Murad Khan and he lost his life. The Turkmen repelled the Russian troops, but the death of Murad Khan prevented the victory from being celebrated enthusiastically. At nightfall the Russians drew off and formed a defensive. Tekke cavalry followed and threatened but did nothing serious. By September 19 they were again south of the Kopet Dagh. On September 29 General Tergukasov reached Chat to replace Lazarev and Lomakin and learned of the disaster. By the end of October the whole force was back at Chikishlyar except for some outposts. By the end of the year most of the troops were back on the west side of the Caspian.

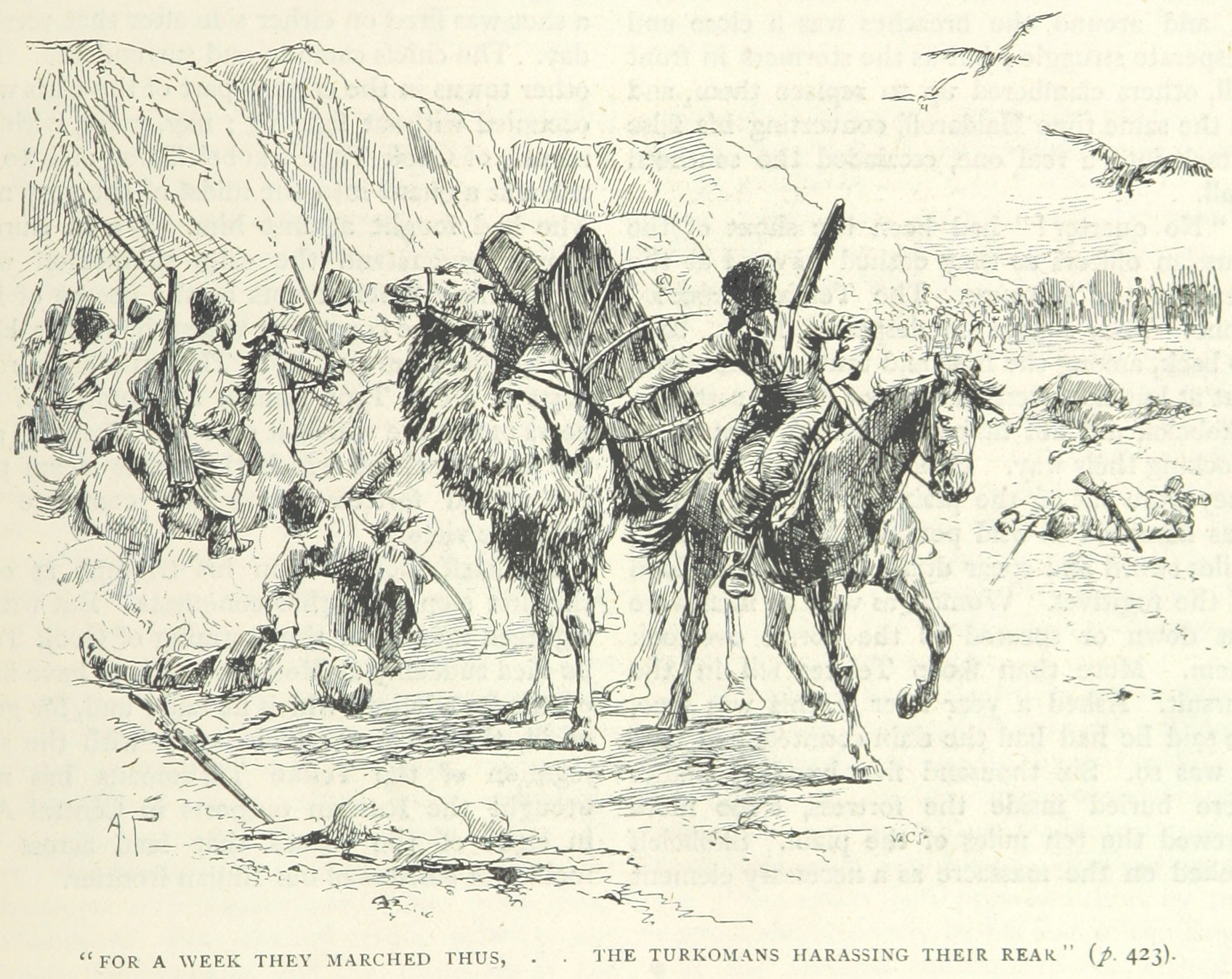
Turkmen follow the retreat.

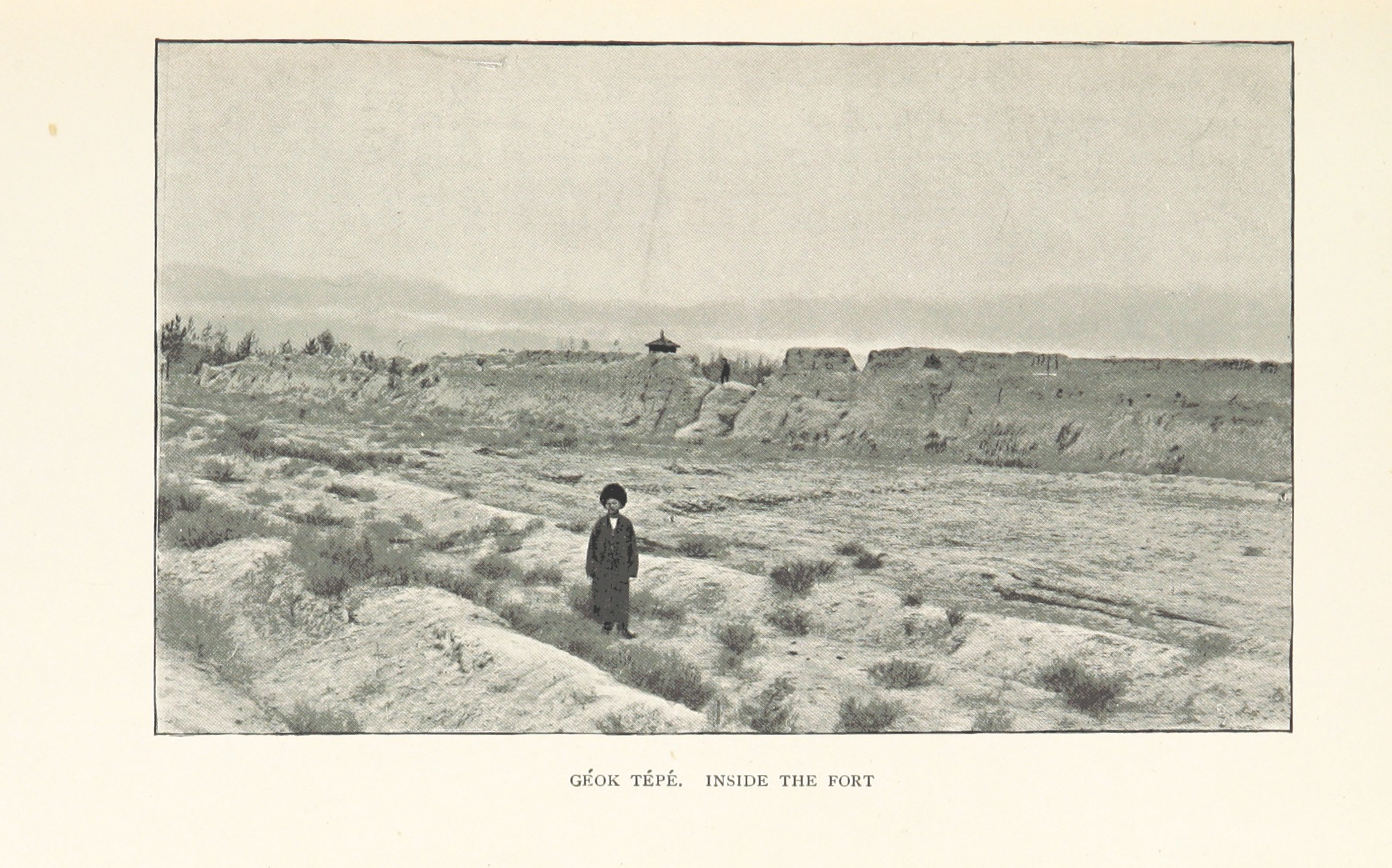
Ruins of the fort

== Accounting ==
The Russians lost 445 killed and wounded, about a third of the attacking infantry, and the Tekkes about 2000 dead and 2000 wounded. Almost all the camels died. Lomakin was blamed not only for his incompetent attack but for the needless slaughter of an enemy who would probably have surrendered or run away when confronted by a larger and better managed force. He was accused of preferring a bloody victory to something slow and sure, but it is also true that he had to act quickly because he had not brought enough supplies. He was accused of moving too quickly because he knew that he would soon be replaced by Lazarev's successor. His decision to abandon Lazarev's plan for a large supply dump restricted his freedom of movement. The Tekkes were partly responsible for the slaughter since they put so many people in one place. Perhaps they did not fully understand explosive artillery shells. Also, it is easier to defeat an enemy in pieces. A bloody defeat of the western Tekkes might have demoralized the eastern Tekkes, while if they had escaped they could have joined their fellows to the east and been much more formidable.

== See also ==
- Russian Turkestan
- Russian conquest of Turkestan
- For other victories of indigenous peoples in nineteenth-century colonial wars see Battle of the Little Big Horn, Battle of Isandlwana, Battle of Adwa, and 1842 retreat from Kabul.
- Aerial view of battlefield and memorial mosque 38.167286°N 57.967847°E

== Sources ==
Charles Thomas Marvin, The Eye-Witnesses’ Account of the disastrous Russian Campaign against the Akhal Tekke Turkomans, 1880
