= Nikolai Lomakin =

Russian military commander (1830–1902)

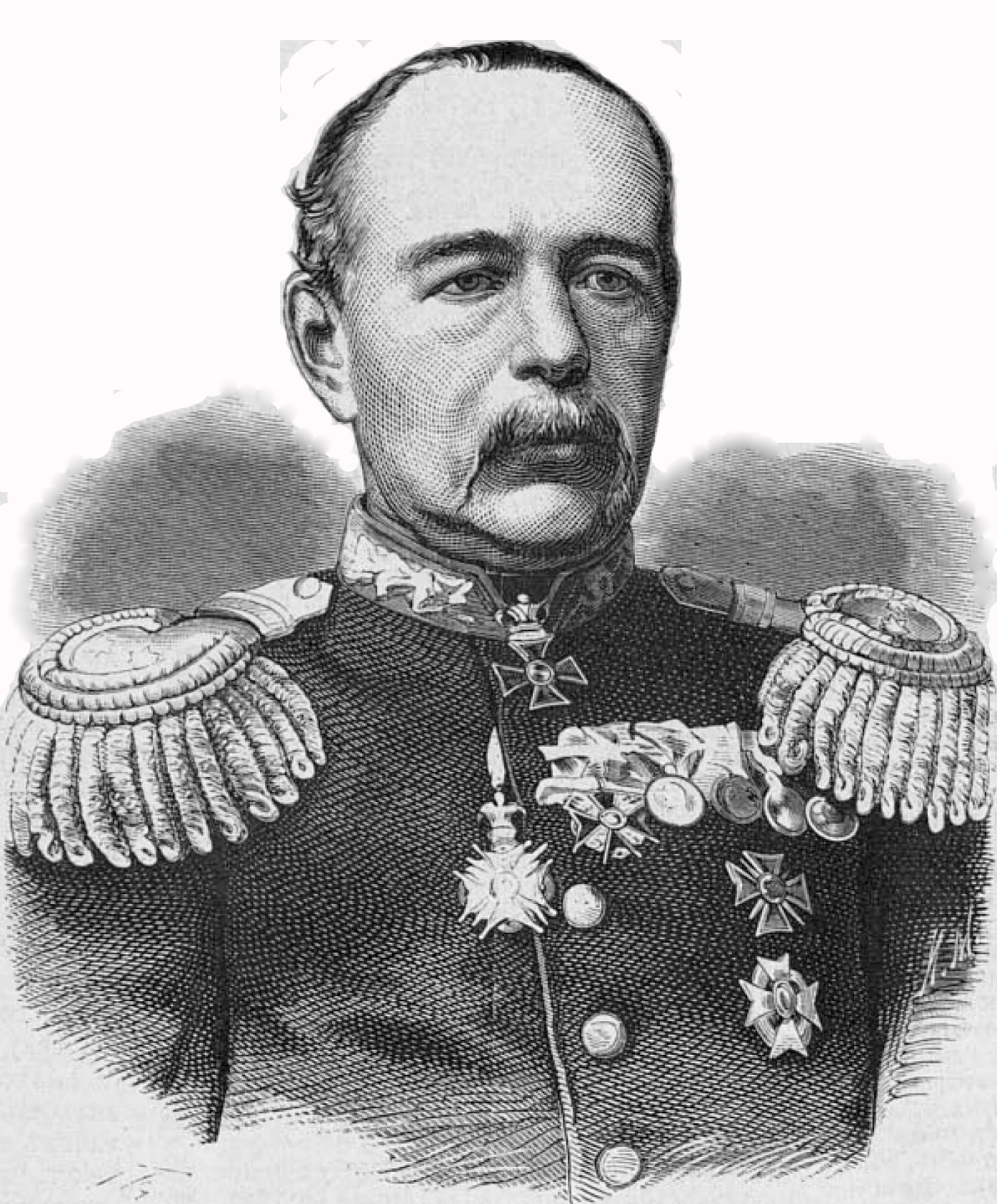
General Lomakin

General Nikolai Pavlovich Lomakin (Russian: Николай Павлович Ломакин; 1830–1902) was a 19th-century Russian military commander. He was born in Baku in 1830. He joined the Polotsk Cadet Corps and commenced service with the 19th Artillery Brigade. From 1850 onwards, he fought in the Caucasian War, serving with distinction and taking part in special assignments in Daghestan. This was followed by further success in the Khiva campaign of 1873, which saw Lomakin rise to the rank of major general and win various military awards.

In 1879, Lomakin became commander of the Akhal-Teke expedition in Turkmenistan, following the death of General I. D. Lazarev. He commanded an assault Geok-Tepe were about 2000 men, women and children were killed before the Turkmen forces managed to repel the Russian assault. After the failed capture of Geok-Tepe he was replaced by Mikhail Skobelev. After his service in Central Asia he was posted to Tiflis and gradually rose through the ranks, eventually retiring from the army in 1897 with the rank of general.

He died in Tiflis in 1902. His memoirs of service in the Transcaspian territory were published after his death.
