= Defender of the Fatherland Day (Turkmenistan) =

Professional holiday for the Armed Forces of Turkmenistan

Defender of the Fatherland Day (Turkmen: Watan gününiň goragçysy) is a professional holiday for the Armed Forces of Turkmenistan (coequally known as the Turkmen National Army) celebrated annually on 27 January. It commemorates the de facto anniversary of founding of Turkmenistan's National Army in 1992 via the founding of the Ministry of Defense. The event is marked by military parades, fireworks and ceremonies all around the country. The holiday is perceived to be the Turkmen analogue to the Defender of the Fatherland Day in Russia and the Commonwealth of Independent States celebrated traditionally on 23 February. It was previously celebrated as Army Day until President Gurbanguly Berdimuhamedow changed its name in 2009.

== Celebrations ==
The President of Turkmenistan typically delivers holiday greetings in his capacity as head of state and Supreme Commander in Chief. The message, which is published on the government website, is also read before military formations during the morning roll call. The Ministry of Defense traditionally organizes festive concerts and activities in military units on this day. Festive concerts by art groups are held at the military higher education establishments in Ashgabat and Türkmenbaşy, as well as in all the military garrisons. On the occasion of the 20th anniversary in 2012, the opening of another complex of buildings of the Military Institute and the Central House of Officers of the Ministry of Defence as well as the opening of a junior military school took place. On the armed force's 25th anniversary in 2017, the presentation of military banners to existing as well as newly created military units took place. The holiday has also been used for military-political purposes. For example, the current military doctrine was adopted on the eve of the holiday in 2016.

== See also ==
- Independence Day (Turkmenistan)
- Public holidays in Turkmenistan
- Navy Day (Turkmenistan)
- Defender of the Fatherland Day (Kazakhstan)
- Tajik National Army Day
- Defender of the Motherland Day
