= Halk Hakydasy Memorial Complex =

Memorial complex in Ashgabat, Turkmenistan

Coordinates: 37°56′08″N 58°19′00″E

Halk Hakydasy Memorial Complex is a memorial complex to the honour of those killed in the Battle of Geok Tepe in 1881, in World War II, and in the 1948 Ashgabat earthquake. It is in the southwestern part of Ashgabat, Turkmenistan.

== History ==
Construction began in September 2012 by the Turkish company Polimeks. On 5 October 2014, the memorial was given the official name the Halk Hakydasy ('People's Memory'). The memorial complex opened on 6 October 2014, on Memorial Day, with the participation of the president of Turkmenistan, Gurbanguly Berdimuhamedow. In 2020, the diamond jubilee of the victory in the Great Patriotic War was celebrated with a military parade and festive celebrations at the complex. This was the first ever Victory Parade to be held since Turkmen independence was attained, being held in front of a square at the complex. Soldiers of the Armed Forces of Turkmenistan took part in the parade, which was attended by President Gurbanguly Berdimuhamedow and Russian Deputy Minister of Defence Alexander Fomin.

== Architectural ensemble ==
The memorial complex covers 650 thousand square meters, being 916 meters long and 626 meters wide. The complex includes a monument erected in honour of the victory in the Great Patriotic War (1941–1945), and the memorial perpetuating the memory of the heroes who died during the battle near Geok Depe and the casualties of the 1948 Ashgabat earthquake. Also built in the memorial is a museum. There are buildings for the Muslim rite sadaqah. Near the monuments are fountains, lawns and flower beds, paved paths, installed decorative lamps and benches. At night, the complex is illuminated by searchlights.

=== Monument Ruhy Tagzym ===
A monument dedicated to the victims of the 1948 Ashgabat earthquake. The bronze sculpture is 10 meters high, mounted on a marble podium, rising above an area of 24 meters, a monument built on the initiative of Saparmyrat Nyýazow as a mighty bull tossing the world on its horns, and the bodies of the dead people, and on top a woman, with her last desperate hand movements saving her baby, lifting it over the ruins of the city. Until 2012 it was in the central square of Ashgabat. The basis of the design of the monument is an ancient legend about a fantastic bull holding the Earth on its horns, and its bellowing is heard as underground earthquake noises.

=== Monument Baky şöhrat ===
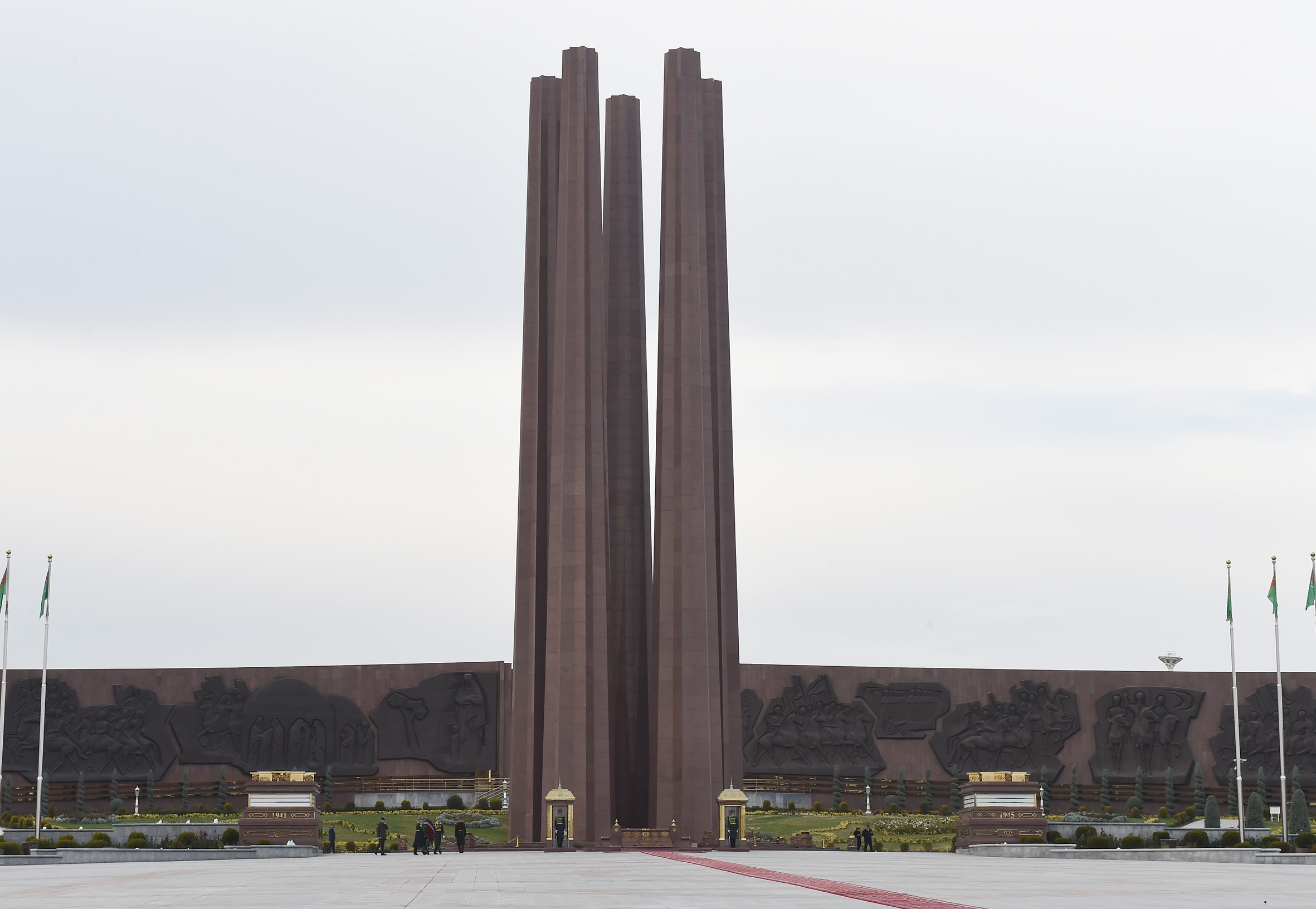
The eternal glory memorial

Monument to those who fell in the 1941–1945 Great Patriotic War. Until 2014, it was called the "Eternal Flame" and was in the center of Ashgabat; it was dismantled in the reconstruction of the park area. The new monument is significantly different from the former; four 27-meter high steles embodying the unfolding flower, were replaced with five steles with a base in the form of an eight-pointed star. The monument was unveiled in 1970 in honour of the 25th anniversary of the Victory.

=== Monument Milletiň ogullary ===
The monument depicts the Mother bowing her head and holding her son in an arm. Until 2014, the monument was in the center of Ashgabat. It was built in commemoration of the heroes of other battles for the Motherland (Turkmenistan).

== Museum "Watan mukaddesligi" ==
The museum has two halls—Ýer titreme ('Museum of the Earthquake') and Sowes ('War Museum'). The hall dedicated to the memory of the defenders of the fortress Geok Tepe, is the layout of the fortress, the real cold and firearms, clothing and military equipment, combatants, archival documents and photographs, diorama of the Battle of Geok Tepe. In the room dedicated to Turkmen citizens who fell in the Great Patriotic War of 1941–1945 is an exhibition of works of Turkmen painters, graphic artists, sculptors, and ceramists. A separate exposition hall has reconstructed pictures of the Ashgabat earthquake, photographs and exhibits of documentary chronicles.
