= Turkmen-class corvette =

Class overview
- Operators: Turkmen Naval Forces
- Active: 1

General characteristics
- Type: Corvette
- Displacement: 1,600 tonnes (1,570 long tons; 1,760 short tons)
- Length: 91.4 m (299 ft 10 in)
- Beam: 14.4 m (47 ft 3 in)
- Speed: 26 knots (48.2 km/h; 29.9 mph)
- Range: 3,000 nautical miles (5,560 km)
- Complement: 100
- Armament: Anti-surface warfare: Canister-launched firing: 8 x MBDA Otomat Mk 2 missiles; Anti-air warfare: 16-cell vertical launch system firing: VL MICA; Anti-submarine warfare: Rocket and torpedo launchers; Guns: 76 mm Leonardo Super Rapid Gun, 35 mm Gokdeniz Close-in Weapon System
- Aviation facilities: Flight deck
- Notes: Sources:

The Turkmen-class corvette is a class of a single ship, the Deňiz Han, presently serving as the flagship of the Turkmenistan Navy in the Caspian Sea.

== History ==
The Turkmenistan Navy has since 2010 ordered ships from the Turkish shipbuilding company Dearsan. During the International Defence Industry Fair held in Turkey in 2019, Turkmenistan officials signed a contract with the joint-venture Gülhan and Dearsan shipyards. The contract was not officially announced, but leaked information revealed the acquisition of one corvette, with options for additional purchases. The corvette was to be based on the C92 design by Dearsan, intended for anti-air, anti-surface and anti-submarine warfare.

The lead ship, Deňiz Han, was built in Urfa shipyard at Dzhanga, Balkan Region with materiel imported from Turkey. She was commissioned on 11 August 2021 at Turkmenbashi Naval Base in a ceremony officiated by President Gurbanguly Berdimuhamedov. The class is intended to protect Turkmenistan's exclusive economic zone in the Caspian Sea.

== Capabilities ==
The Turkmen-class features a 76 mm Leonardo Super Rapid Gun as the main gun. The 35 mm Gokdeniz Close-in Weapon System makes its debut on the class as the secondary gun armament. It has a 16-cell vertical launch system firing VL MICA anti-air missiles and 8 canisters for MBDA Otomat Mk 2 anti-ship missiles. Rocket and torpedo launchers for anti-submarine warfare are also installed.

There is a flight deck for helicopter and drone operations, but no hangar.

== Ships in class ==
Ship	Pennant number	Launched	Commissioned	Status
Deňiz Han	01		11 August 2021	In active service
