= State Flag and Constitution Day (Turkmenistan) =

Official holiday of Turkmenistan

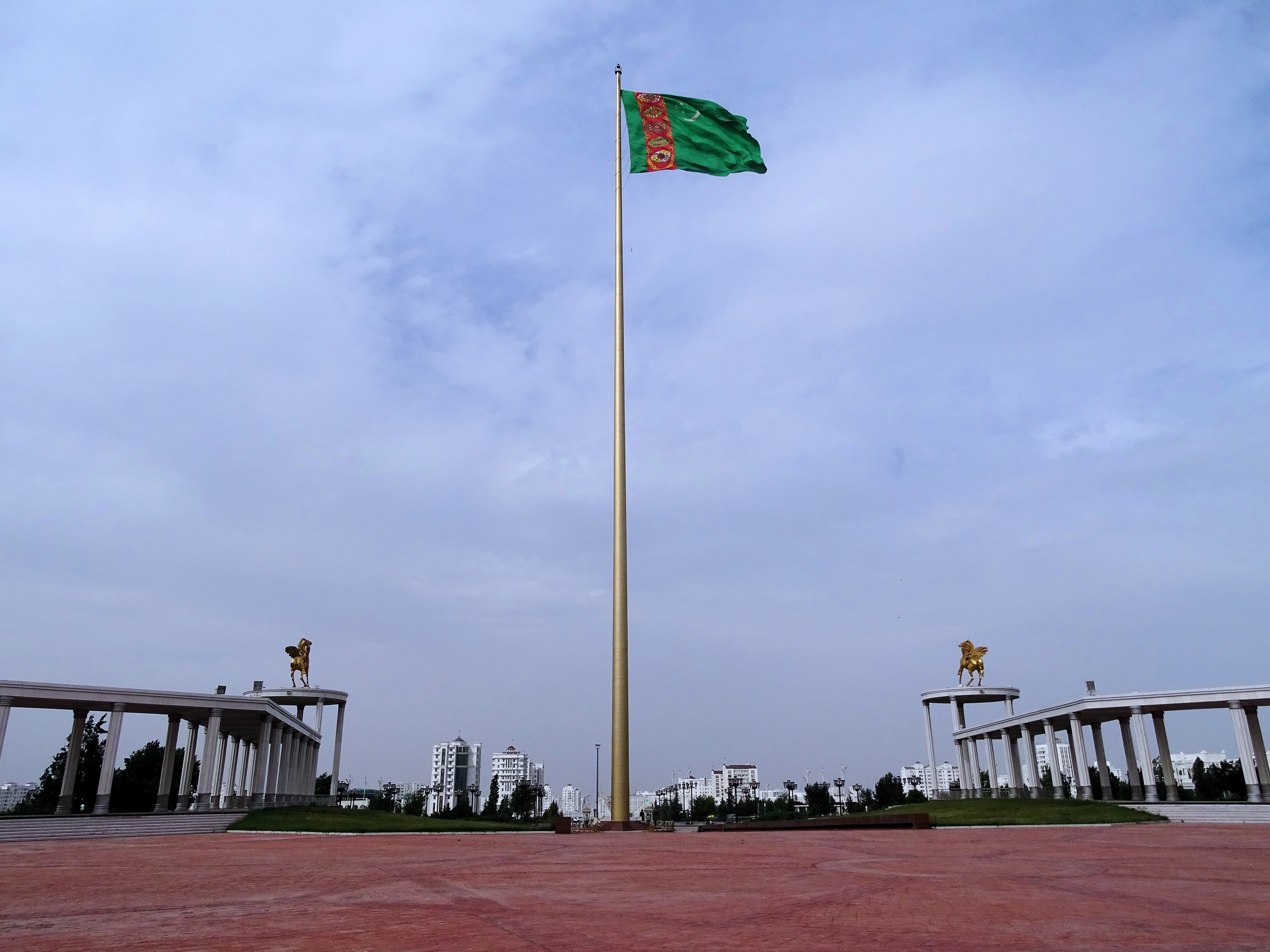
The Flag of Turkmenistan at the Ashgabat Flagpole.

The Day of the State Flag of Turkmenistan is an official holiday of Turkmenistan.

== History ==
It marks the day Turkmenistan approved its current national flag on 19 February 1992. On 26 December 1994, President Saparmurat Niyazov ordered the day to become a state holiday and a non-working day. At a session of the People's Council of Turkmenistan on 10 October 2017, a decision was made to combine State Flag Day with Constitution Day and to move it to 18 May. They were both celebrated jointly for the first time in 2018.

== Commemorations ==
A traditional flower laying ceremony is held at the Monument to the Constitution and the Main Flag of Turkmenistan. The head of state and the participants in festive ceremonies lay flowers to the national flag. Festive events and performances in Ashgabat take place at the Saparmurat Turkmenbashi Olympic Stadium. Prison amnesty from the President is also traditionally held on Flag Day. Festive events marking the holiday also take place in all regions of the country. Turkmen pop artists and singers performs folk songs at central squares. In 2020, on the night of 18 May, the colors of the flag of Turkmenistan were flashed on the Tbilisi TV Broadcasting Tower, cumulating the holidays events in Georgia which also included an event organized by the Tbilisi City Hall with the support of the Embassy of Turkmenistan in Georgia.

== See also ==
- Public holidays in Turkmenistan
