= Turkmen Naval Forces =

Turkmenistan Military unit

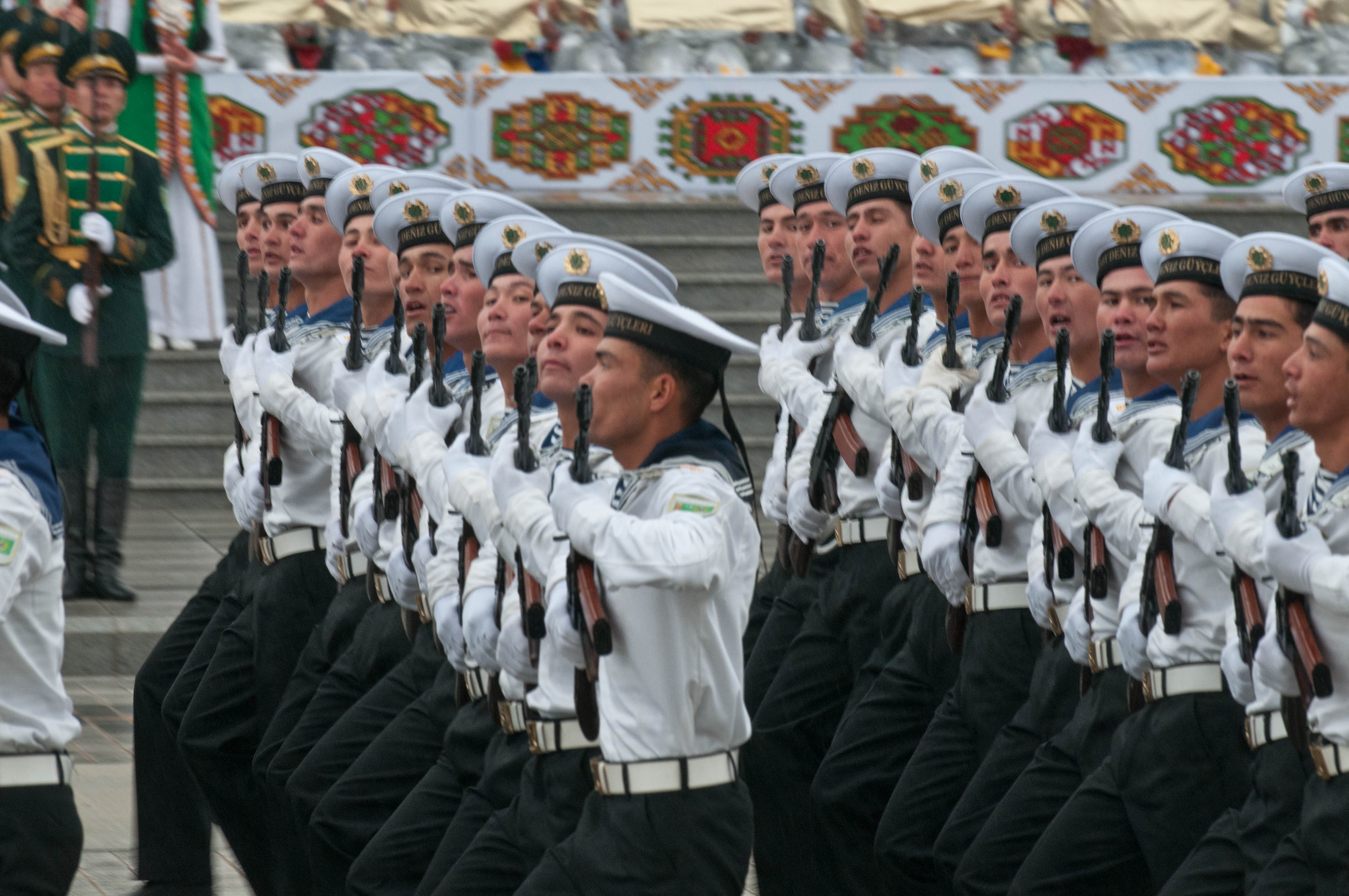
- Turkmen navy sailors during a parade in 2011.
- Founded: 1992 (under the DSG); 2011 (as independent branch)
- Country: Turkmenistan
- Type: Navy
- Role: Naval warfare and defense
- Size: 2,000 sailors and 16 patrol boats
- Part of: Armed Forces of Turkmenistan
- Headquarters: Türkmenbaşy
- Colors: Yellow, blue, and white
- Anniversaries: October 9: Navy Day

Commanders
- Supreme Commander-in-Chief: Serdar Berdimuhamedow
- Commander of the Navy: Lieutenant Colonel B. Annaev
- Notable commanders: Major General Begench Gundogdyev

Insignia
- Ensign

The Turkmen Naval Forces (Turkmen: Türkmenistanyň Harby-deňiz Güýçleri), colloquially referred to as the Turkmenistan Navy, is the naval warfare branch of the armed forces of Turkmenistan. Turkmenistan's Navy Day is celebrated annually on October 9. The naval forces were directed by the Border Guard Service until 2009.

Although Turkmenistan is not connected to the world's oceans, it is on the Caspian Sea, the world's largest lake, which is where the Naval Forces operate. There are no large navigable rivers in the country, so they are not active on the rivers.

== History ==
The Turkmenistan Navy was established in 1992. From 1992 to 1997, the Navy of Turkmenistan existed as a separate division of border guard ships and boats, deployed in the city of Turkmenbashy as part of the Border Troops of the Ministry of Defense of Turkmenistan, and then transferred to the subordination of the State Border Service of Turkmenistan. In August 2009, President of Turkmenistan Gurbanguly Berdimuhammedov announced the creation of a new independent navy, saying that it would be used to protect the nation from external threats, such as "international terrorist groups" who "would like to disturb the Turkmen people's peaceful life". On 1 October 2009, Berdimuhammedov declared the previous Turkmen Navy null and void. On 22 January 2010, a 5-year program for the development of the Navy was implemented, which laid the foundation for the creation of a national Navy as part of the Ministry of Defense.

At the end of that five-year period in 2015, the navy engaged in its first major action since establishment. Turkmen naval vessels fired on a fishing boat from Iran, sinking it and killing one of the fishermen. Iranian media referred to the navy's actions as "a move beyond diplomatic norms and contrary to international law". In September 2017, it held its first naval exercises in the Caspian Sea. In early 2018, efforts were continued to strengthen the navy.

On 11 August 2021, President Berdimuhammedov commissioned the navy's first domestically assembled corvette, the Deniz Han.

== Organization ==
In 2010, the Turkmenistan Navy consisted of 16 patrol boats and 2,000 servicemen.

=== Ships ===
- Patrol Ship Sanjar
- Turkmen-class corvette

=== Base ===
The naval headquarters is the "Garshy" or "Dzhanga" Naval Base located at Türkmenbaşy şäherçesi in the Turkmenbashy Gulf.

=== Turkmen Marines ===
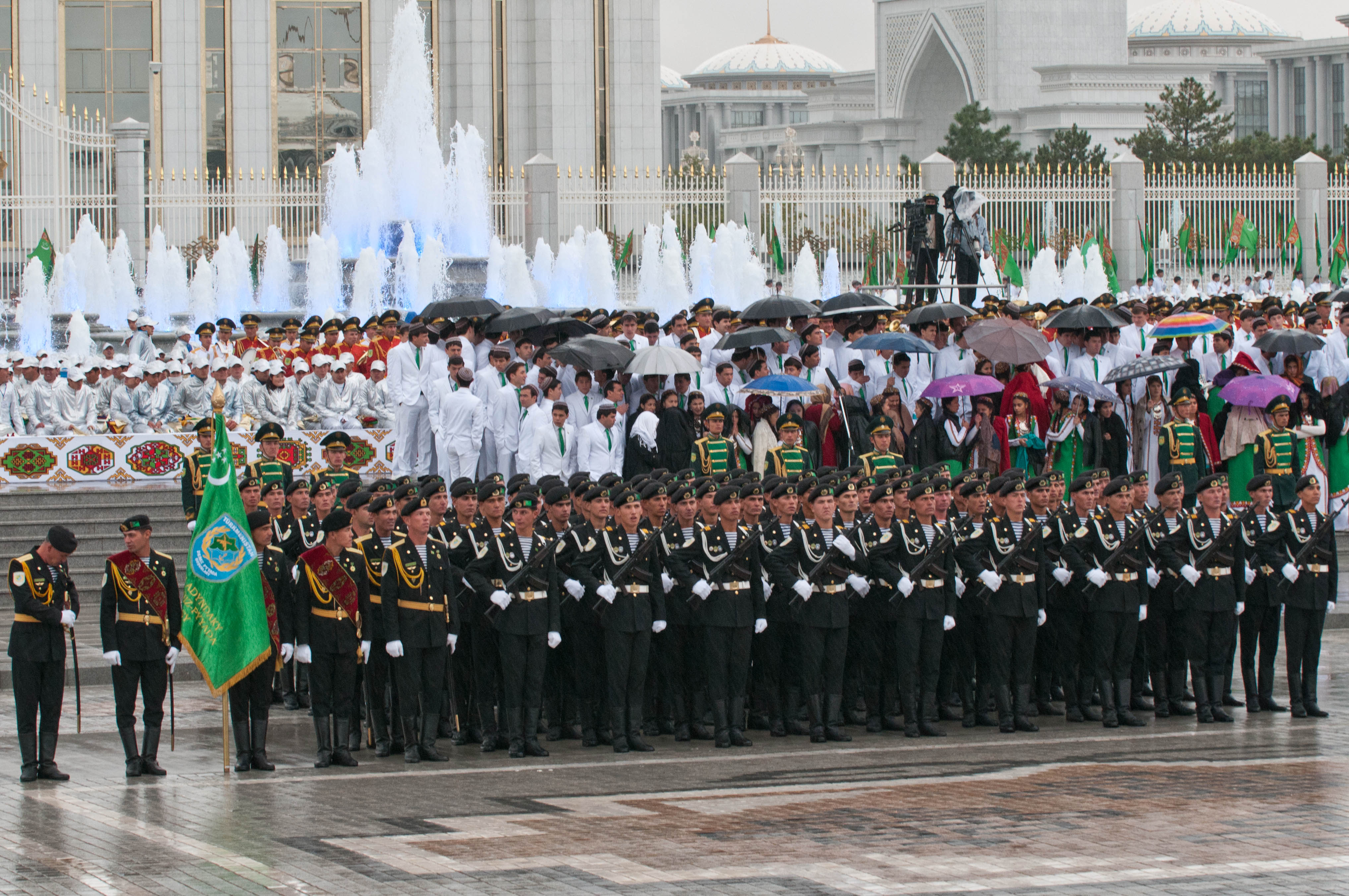
Turkmen marines on parade.

A naval infantry (marine) unit is maintained in the Navy, the Naval Infantry Separate Brigade named after Oghuz Khagan (Turkmen: Oguz Han adyndaky Deňiz Pyýada Goşunynyň Aýratyn Brigadasy). It was issued its new colors in October 2011.

== Equipment ==
Equipment as of 2022 regardless of the operating service

Type	Class	Origin	Number of Ships	Displacement	Length	Notes/ Weapons
Corvettes (3)
Corvette	Deniz Han (C-92)	Turkey	1	1600 tonnes	91 meter	1x76mm Super Rapid Gun 8x Otomat Mk2 Anti-Ship Missiles 16x VL Mica SAM 1x 35 mm ASELSAN Gokdeniz CIWS 2x 25mm ASELSAN STOP RWS 2x12.7mm ASELSAN STAMP RWS 6x ROKETSAN ASW Rocket Launcher 2x3 Torpedo Tubes
Corvette	Molniya	Russia	2	550 tonnes	56 meter	1x 76mm Gun 16x Kh-35 Uran Anti-Ship Missiles 4x Igla MANPADS 2x Ak-630 CIWS
Missile Boats (16)
Missile Boat	Tuzla (Serhet) Class	Turkey	10	430 tonnes	56 meter	2x 40mm OtoMelara Gun 4x Otomat Mk2 Anti-Ship Missiles or 4x Marte Mk2 Anti-Ship Missiles 4x SIMBAD RC MANPADS 2x 25mm ASELSAN STOP RWS 2x 12.7mm ASELSAN STAMP RWS 6x ROKETSAN ASW Rocket Launcher
Fast Attack Missile Boat	FAC 33	Turkey	6	135 tonnes	33 meter	4x Marte Mk2 Anti-Ship Missiles 1x 25mm ASELSAN STOP RWS 2x 12.7mm Machine Gun
Patrol Boats (15)
Patrol Boat	Point Class	USA	1	69 tonnes	25 meter	1x 20 mm Gun
Patrol Boat	Sobol Class	Russia	2	57 tonnes	30 meter	1x14.5 mm Machine Gun 2x Igla MANPADS 1x 30 mm Grenade Launcher
Patrol Boat	Kalkan-M	Ukraine	1		24 meter	Machine Gun
Fast Intervention Boat	FIB-15	Turkey	10	22 tonnes	15 meter	1x 12.7mm ASELSAN STAMP RWS
Patrol Boat	Grif (Grit-T)	Ukraine	1		11 meter	Machine Gun
Amphibious Warfare Ship (1)
Landing Craft		Turkey	1		27 meter	2x 12.7mm RWS
Auxiliary Vessels
Multi-Purpose Offshore Support Vessel	MPOSV-72	Turkey	5	2700 tonnes	72 meter	2x 12.7mm RWS
Hydrographic Survey Ship	HSV-41	Turkey	1	500 tonnes	41 meter	2x 12.7mm RWS
Fast Passenger Ferry		Turkey	1	140 tonnes	38 meter	
Tug Boat		Turkey	2	900 tonnes	32 meter	

=== Under the Defence Ministry ===
Equipment as of 2015:

Original nation	Type	Class	Name	Side number	Notes
Russia	Missile boat	Project 12418	Edermen	828 [later 211]	
Russia	Missile boat	Project 12418	Gayratly	829 [later 214]	
Turkey; Turkmenistan	Speed patrol boat	NTPB project			Armed with French-produced SIMBAD-RC naval surface-to-air missiles
Soviet Union	ambulance boat	etc. SK620	No data	No data	
United States	landing boat	type LCM-1	No data	SK 156	
Turkmenistan	tow	No data	No data	No data	
Turkmenistan	special ship	No data	No data		Launched on 10 October 2015

=== Under the DSG ===
Equipment includes:

Original nation	Type	Class	Name	Side number	Notes
United States	Patrol boat	project from Point	Merjin	SG110	10 May 2010 at Point Jackson
Turkey; Turkmenistan	Fleet patrol boat	NTPB project	Arkadag	SG111	2012
Turkey; Turkmenistan	Fleet patrol boat	NTPB project	Berkarar	SG112	
Turkey; Turkmenistan	Fleet patrol boat	NTPB project	Merdana	SG113	
Turkey; Turkmenistan	Fleet patrol boat	NTPB project	Erkana	SG114	
Turkey; Turkmenistan	Fleet patrol boat	NTPB project	Asuda	SG115	
Turkey; Turkmenistan	Fleet patrol boat	NTPB project	Mergen	SG116	
Turkey; Turkmenistan	Fleet patrol boat	NTPB project	Hüsgär	SG117	
Turkey; Turkmenistan	Fleet patrol boat	NTPB project	Synmaz	SG118	
Turkey; Turkmenistan	Fleet patrol boat	NTPB project	Nayza	SG119	
Turkey; Turkmenistan	Fleet patrol boat	NTPB project	Ezber	SG120	
Turkey; Turkmenistan	Fleet patrol boat	NTPB project	Algyr	211	
Turkey; Turkmenistan	Fleet patrol boat	NTPB project	Hanjar ?	215	
Turkey; Turkmenistan	Small missile boat ( Marte 2/N )	Dearsan 33 project	Kämil	SG121	2015
Turkey; Turkmenistan	Small missile boat ( Marte 2/N )	Dearsan 33 project	<unknown>	SG122	
Turkey; Turkmenistan	Small missile boat ( Marte 2/N )	Dearsan 33 project	Galjaň	SG123	
Turkey; Turkmenistan	Small missile boat ( Marte 2/N )	Dearsan 33 project	Gaplaň	SG124	
Turkey	Fleet patrol boat	Type АМВ	Bars-12	No data	
Ukraine	Patrol boat	Кalkan-М	No data	No data	Purchased in 2002.
Ukraine	Patrol boat	Grid-T	No data	No data	Purchased in 2002.
Russia	Patrol boat		No data	SK 131	
Russia	Patrol boat		No data		

== Naval education ==
=== Turkmen Naval Institute ===
In June 2010, the State Security Council of Turkmenistan announced the creation of a naval institute (Turkmen: Harby-deňiz institutynda) in Turkmenbashi. It was officially opened by President Berdimuhamedow on Navy Day in 2015. It is one of the more recently established military educational institutions in Turkmenistan. In September 2014, over 100 cadets of the naval institute attended a training course organized by the OSCE on maritime border security and the management of ports. Candidates are admitted to the Naval Institute based on the results of entrance exams of the Ministry of Defense of Turkmenistan.

The following have served as rectors of the institute:

- Colonel Serdar Yalkabov (June 2010-3 August 2021)
- Captain 2nd Rank Meylis Byashimov (since 3 August 2021)

=== Specialized Naval School ===
The Specialized Naval School is a boarding school for Turkmen youth, part of the defense ministry. Admission to study at the Specialized Naval School requires youth who are in 7th grade as well as morally educated and physically strong students.

== Ranks and insignia ==
=== Commissioned officer ranks ===
The rank insignia of commissioned officers.

Rank group	General / flag officers				Senior officers			Junior officers
Turkmen Naval Forces
Turkmen Naval Forces	Flot admiraly	Admiral	Wise-admiral	Kontr-admiral	1-nji derejeli kapitan	2-nji derejeli kapitan	3-nji derejeli kapitan	Kapitan-leýtenant	Uly leýtenant	Leýtenant	Kiçi leýtenant

=== Other ranks ===
The rank insignia of non-commissioned officers and enlisted personnel.

Rank group	Senior NCOs				Junior NCOs	Enlisted
Turkmen Naval Forces
Turkmen Naval Forces	Baş gämi starşinasy	Baş starşina	Birinji basgançakly starşina	Ikinji basgançakly starşina		Matros

== See also ==
- Armed Forces of Turkmenistan
- Turkmen Ground Forces
- Turkmen Air Force
- Navy Day (Turkmenistan)
