= Day of Remembrance (Turkmenistan) =

Public holiday in Turkmenistan

The Day of Remembrance (Turkmen: Hatyra Guni) is an official holiday of Turkmenistan, commemorating those who were killed in the 1948 Ashgabat earthquake on 6 October 1948. It is one of two mourning days in Turkmenistan (the other being Memorial Day).

== Background ==
It caused extreme damage and a high number of casualties in the city. Saparmurat Niyazov, who would later become the first President of Turkmenistan, was the only member of his family to survive the earthquake, which killed two of his brothers and as well as his mother. His mother Gurbansoltan Eje later became part of the cult of personality in Niyazov's presidency. The earthquake so claimed the life of Berdymukhamed Annaev, grandfather of Gurbanguly Berdimuhamedow, the current President. Due to censorship of the tragedy by the Communist Party of Turkmenistan and the government of the Turkmen SSR, the event was not widely reported in the national media in the Soviet Union. Aid to victims, as well as restoration of infrastructure was provided by the Soviet Army, with many victims being sent to the neighboring republics of Azerbaijan, Kazakhstan and Uzbekistan.

== Commemorations ==
The country officially began to observe this holiday in 1995. The national memorial ceremony is held at the Halk Hakydasy Memorial Complex, attended by President of Turkmenistan. The leaders of the Assembly of Turkmenistan and members of the Cabinet of Ministers lay flowers at the monument. Ceremony participants observe a minute of silence in memory of the victims of the earthquake. The only ceremony in which the president did not attend was the 55th anniversary in 2003, during which President Niyazov had the common cold. Ceremonies are also held in different regions of the country. For example, the 2010 ceremony was held in Gypjak.

Other memorial actions, particularly prayers and Sadaqah are done in memory of those who died. National flags are traditionally lowered to halfmast in the capital of Ashgabat as well as in the Provinces of Turkmenistan. All national TV channels show documentaries and newsreels of the earthquake.
