= Navy Day (Russia) =

National holiday in Russia

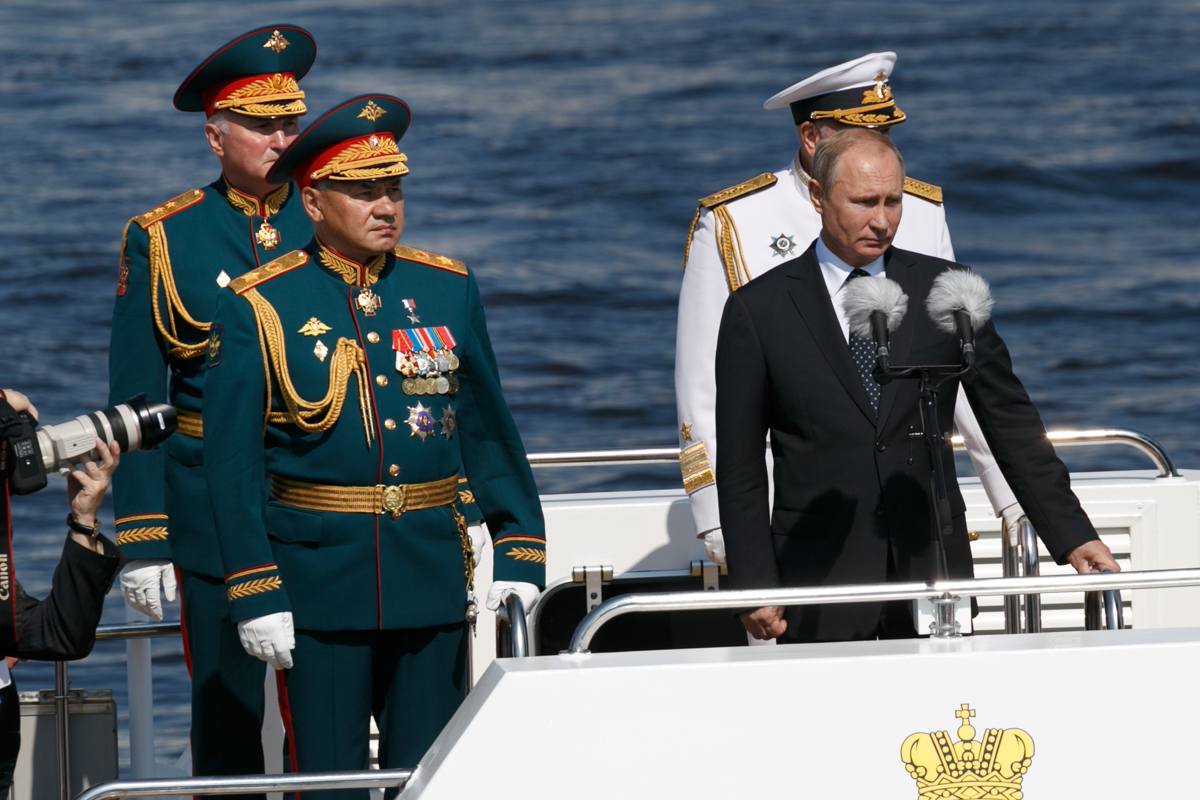
- President Vladimir Putin and Defense Minister Sergey Shoygu during the Navy Day celebrations in 2018.
- Official name: День Военно-Морского Флота
- Also called: Day of the VMF
- Observed by: Russia
- Type: National
- Celebrations: Parades, Fireworks, Rallies (mostly in the naval capital of St. Petersburg)
- Date: July 30
- Frequency: annual

Day of the Russian Navy (Russian: День Военно-Морского Флота России) is national holiday in the Russian Federation and a senior holiday in the Russian Armed Forces. The day honors the sailors in units of the Russian Navy and its specialized arms (Naval Aviation and the Coastal Troops consisting of the Naval Infantry and the Coastal Missile and Artillery Troops). It is celebrated annually, on the last Sunday of July.

== History ==
The original version of the Russian Navy was founded in 1696 for the Tsardom of Russia. In the Soviet Union, Navy Day was established by a decree of the Council of People's Commissars of the USSR and the Central Committee of the VKPB of June 22, 1939 and to be celebrated annually on July 24; in connection with the Battle of Gangut. The holiday was moved to the last Sunday in July on October 1, 1980 by the Presidium of the Supreme Soviet.

== Main Naval Parade ==
=== Overview ===
Russian President Vladimir Putin's speech at the National Naval Parade in 2017.

Russia celebrates Navy Day with a 2-hour fleet review in St. Petersburg near the Neva River and the Port of Kronstadt, commonly known as the Main Naval Parade (Russian: Главный военно-морской парад). It was established by order of President Vladimir Putin on July 27, 2017 as the principal anniversary event in connection with Navy Day celebrations. According to Putin, the idea was conceived while he was reading historical literature on his Ilyushin presidential plane, during which he came across an article about a naval parade in Kronstadt during the Imperial era, after which he called Defense Minister Sergey Shoygu to order him to organize a similar type of event. The parade features ships and marine air force units from the Baltic, Black Sea, Northern and Pacific Fleets as well as the Caspian Flotilla. The naval parade starts at 11:00 AM, with the Commander-in-Chief of the Russian Navy (currently Admiral Nikolai Yevmenov) being the ceremonial commander of the fleet review formation. Holiday commemorative naval parades by ground units and fleet reviews are also held at naval bases all over the country, such as Sevastopol, Kaliningrad, Vladivostok, Severomorsk and Astrakhan. In 2020, a Naval Parade was held in the Dagestani city of Kaspiysk.

In 2023 and 2024 there were no Russian navy parades in occupied Sevastopol. In 2025, Sevastopol Governor Mikhail Razvozhayev said that the schedule for festive events will not be published, "for obvious reasons".

The Royal Danish Navy often monitors Russian ships moving through Danish territorial waters to get to the parade to prevent incidents at sea.

=== Order of ceremony ===
The fleet inspection segment begins when the President leaves the Peter and Paul Fortress aboard a presidential review yacht following the inspection of a guard of honor platoon and the Admiralty Navy Band, together with the Commander in Chief of the Navy and the Minister of Defense, to review a number of stationed vessels representing each of the fleets and the surface and submarine forces of the Navy as a whole docked on the Neva River.

A separate ceremony on Senate Square in the presence of the President of Russia then follows. The ceremony also includes a flag raising ceremony and the presidential holiday address to the nation and the service personnel of the Navy, following which the National Anthem of Russia is played with the firing of a 21-gun salute. The fleet review segment follows, ending with a flypast of naval aviation and in 2021 a marchpast of naval personnel.

In 2025, the main parade in St Petersburg was scheduled for July 27. Early that day, president Vladimir Putin cancelled the parade. Kremlin spokesperson Dmitry Peskov said that this was due to the general situation and security reasons.

=== Previous parades ===
In 2019, the holiday's national fleet review was for the first time in many years attended by naval combat ships from China, India, Vietnam and the Philippines as well as military bands from Thailand and Vietnam that performed with the Central Navy Band of Russia. Foreign ships such as the Chinese missile destroyer Xi'an and the BRP Davao del Sur (LD-602) took part. In Sevastopol, the raising of the flag of the Russian Imperial Navy battleship Imperatritsa Mariya took place during the parade in the presence of Prime Minister Dmitry Medvedev. This was done to commemorate the 80th anniversary of the founding of the Day of the Soviet Navy.

The 2020 celebrations marked the 75th anniversary of the end of the Second World War and the bicentennial of the First Russian Antarctic Expedition. In honor of the former, the parade was closed out with the Alexey Barinov and D-178 landing boats with Katyusha rocket launchers and a T-34 tank aboard, along soldiers dressed in Red Army uniforms and a Soviet naval flag. In the parade speech, President Putin announced that the navy would be armed with hypersonic nuclear strike weapons. The Ukrainian government sent a letter to António Guterres, the Secretary General of the United Nations, in protest of the organization of a naval parade in Sevastopol, which is located in a region that Ukraine says is occupied. On the eve of this letter, the Ukrainian Foreign Ministry sent a similar note of protest to their Russian counterparts.

In 2023, the parade saw the highest level of participation by foreign delegations with Commander of the Iranian Navy Admiral Shahram Irani, as well as the heads of four African states (including the Republic of the Congo, Burkina Faso, Eritrea, and Mali, who were in the city for the Russia–Africa Summit) participating.

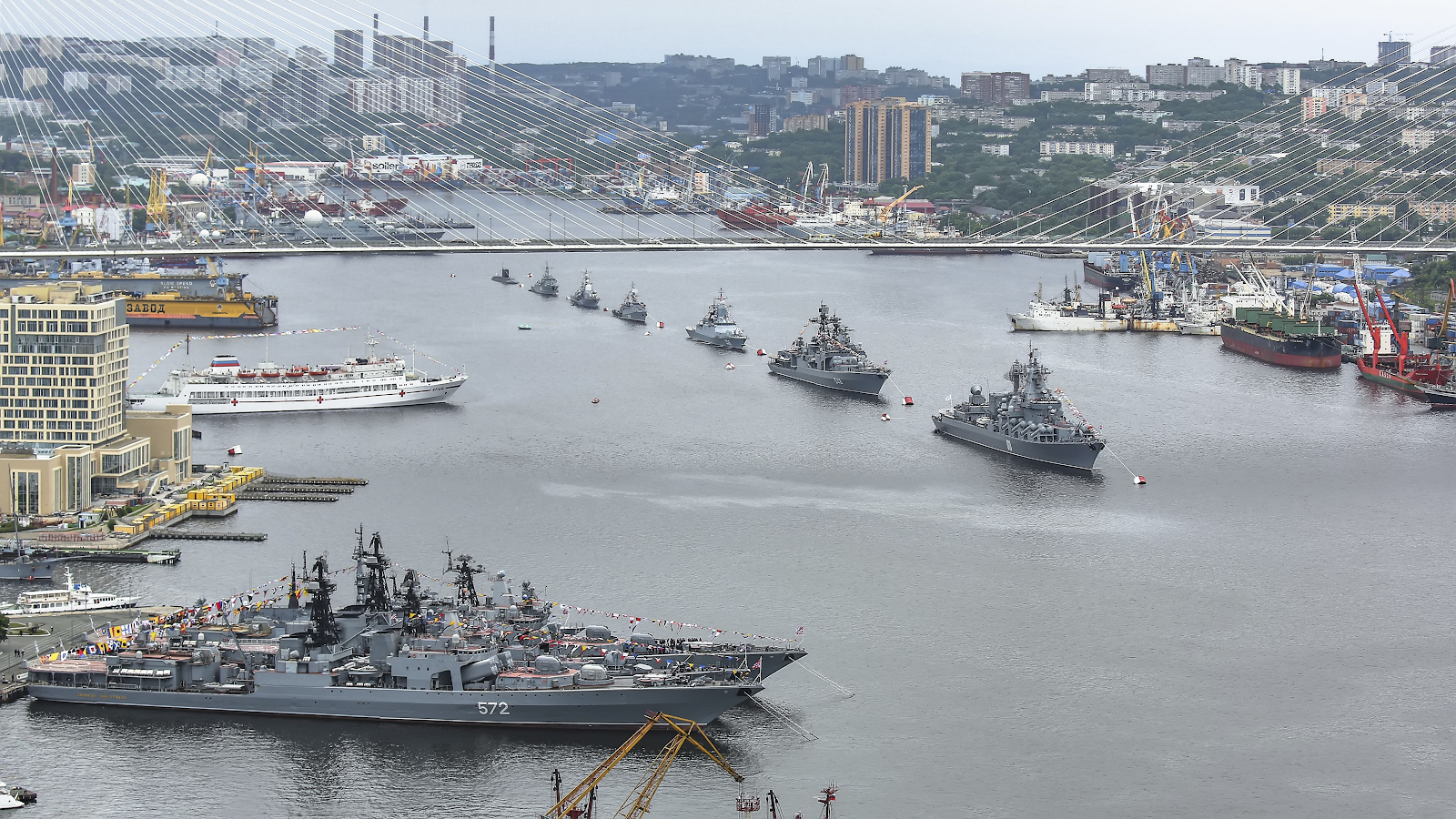
Navy Day parade rehearsal at Zolotoy Rog Bay (Vladivostok, 2020)

== Navy Day reception ==
An official reception is held after the parade at the Admiralty building near the Admiralty Embankment.

== Other celebrations ==
In 2020, as a result of the COVID-19 pandemic in Russia and the postponement of the 2020 Moscow Victory Day Parade, the Immortal Regiment march, which was supposed to be held on 9 May, was also postponed and was announced to be held on Navy Day in a videoconference with President Putin and Minister of Defence Sergey Shoygu. These plans were later scrapped and the march was postponed until 2021.

== Gallery ==
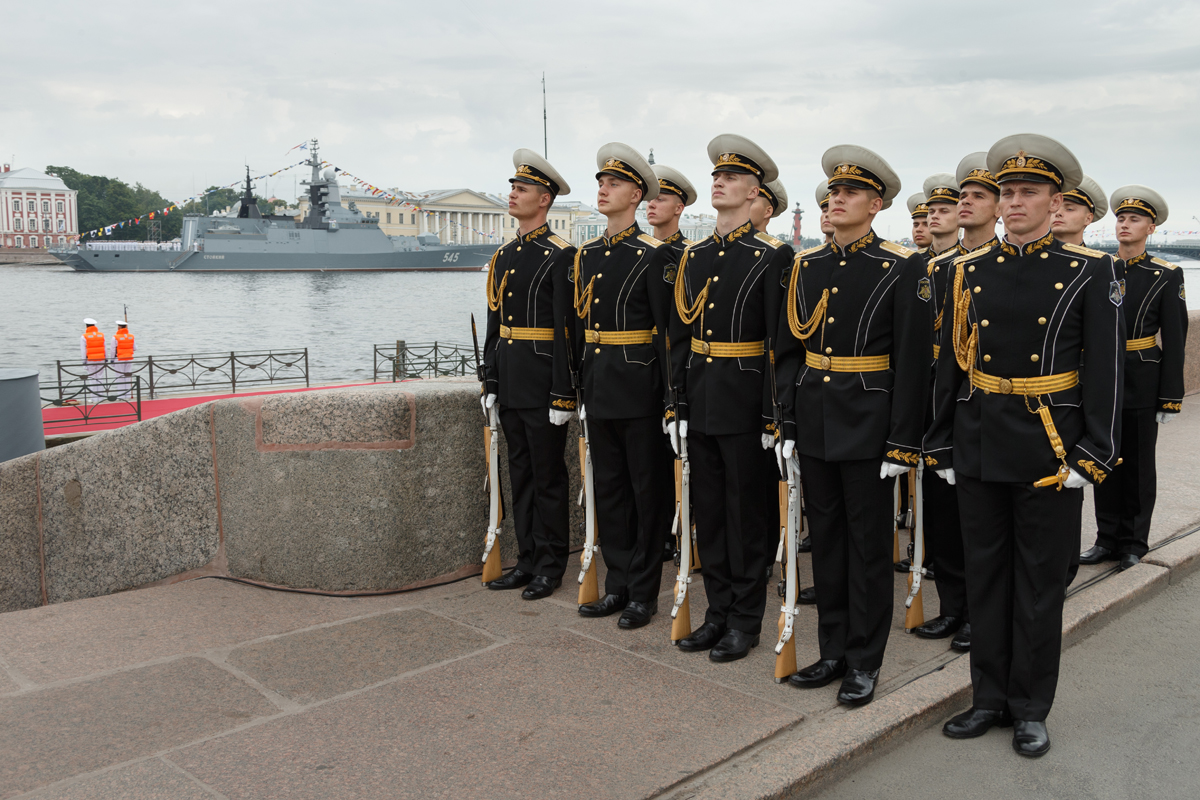
Russian naval honour guards.

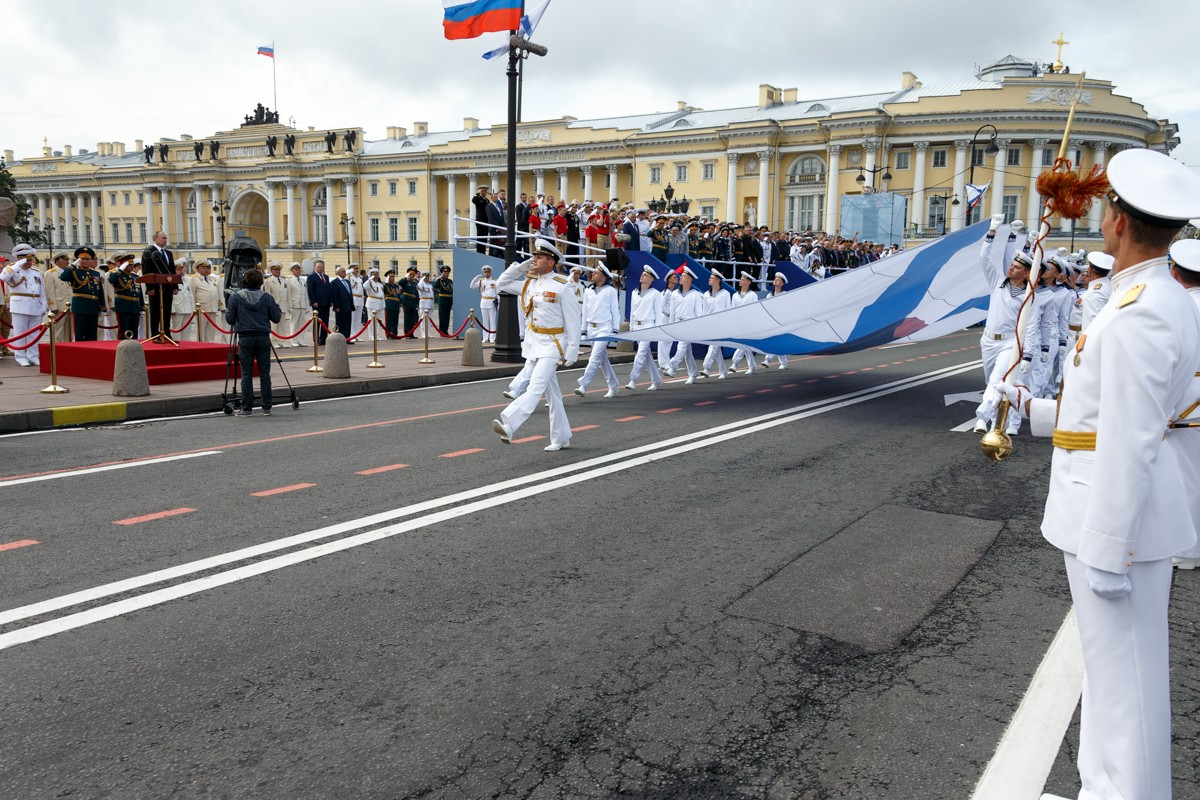
A flag raising ceremony on Senate Square.

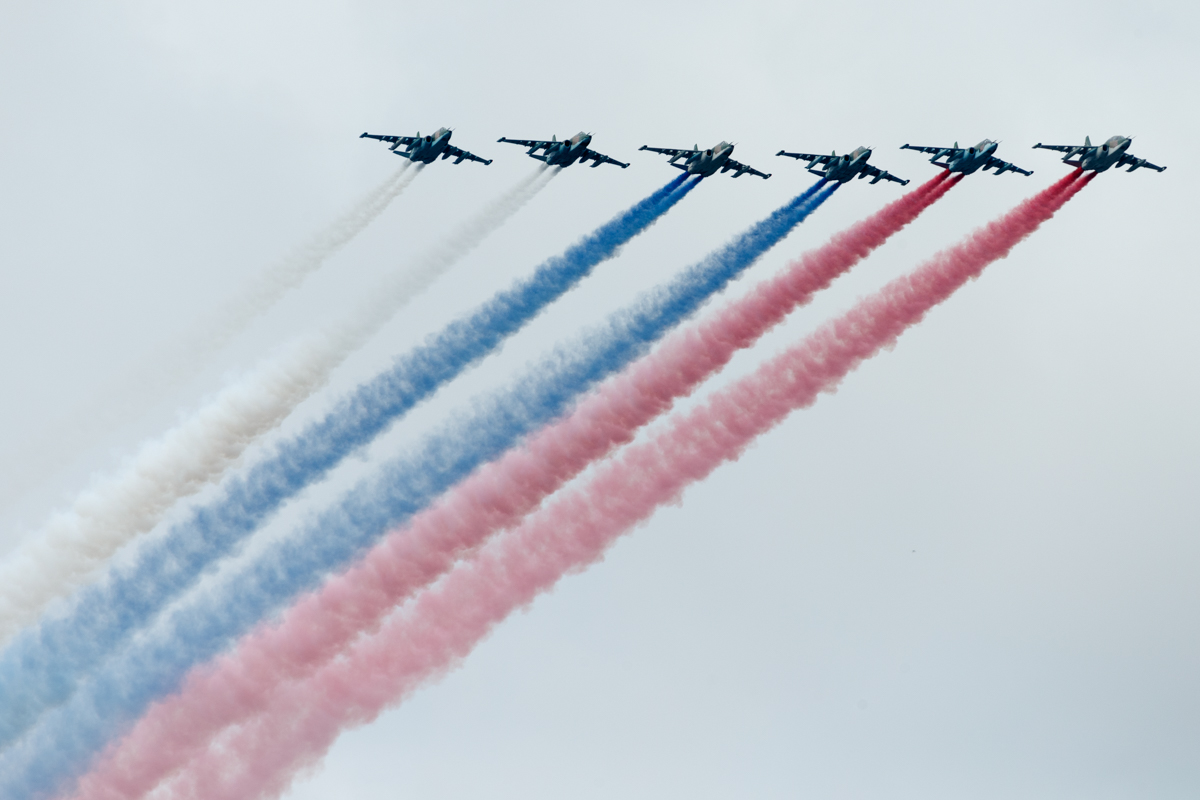
The Russian tri-colour during a flypast by Russian Naval Aviation.

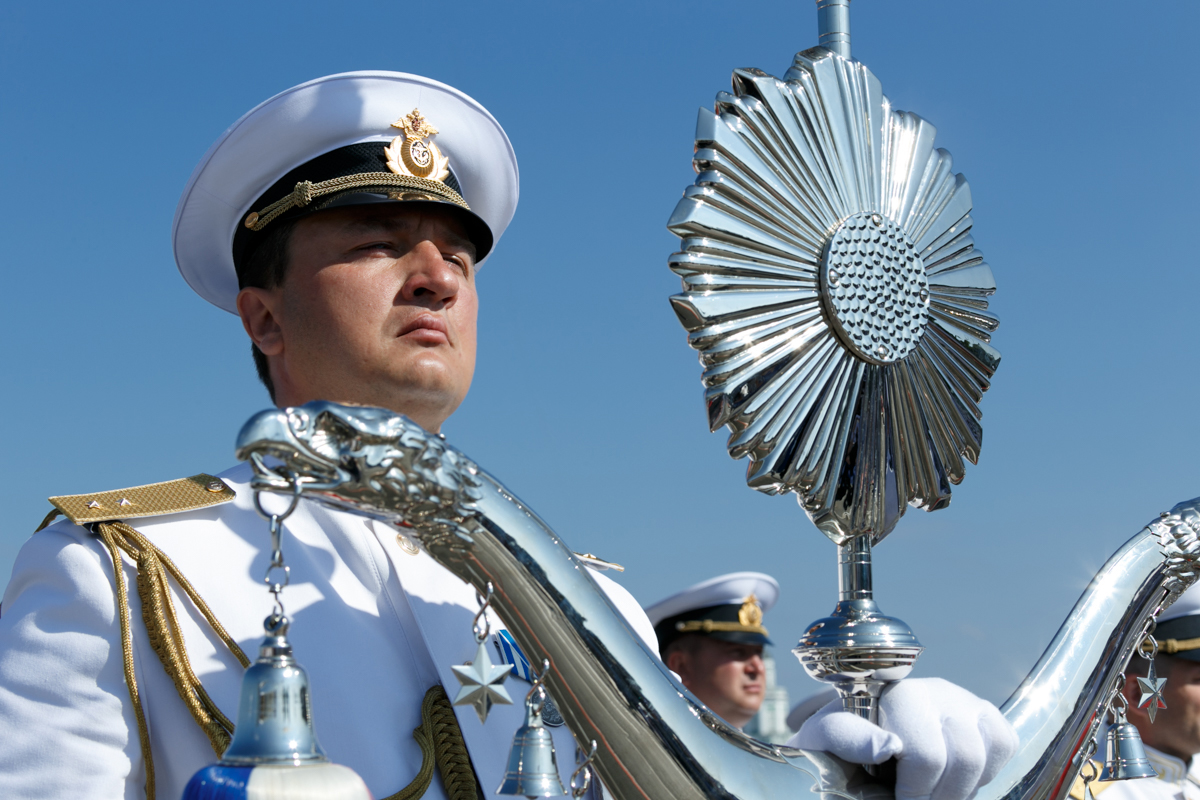
A Schellenbaum holder from the Admiralty Navy Band of Russia.

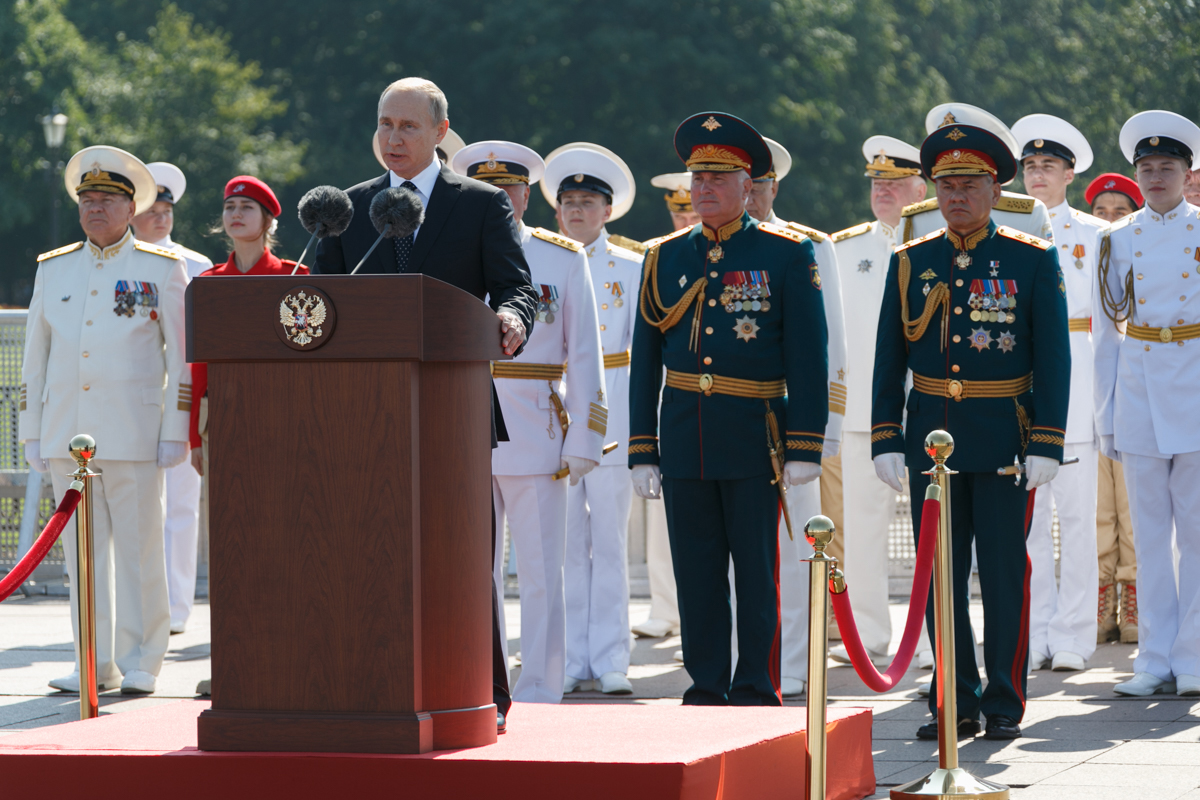
A speech by President Vladimir Putin at the Main Naval Parade.

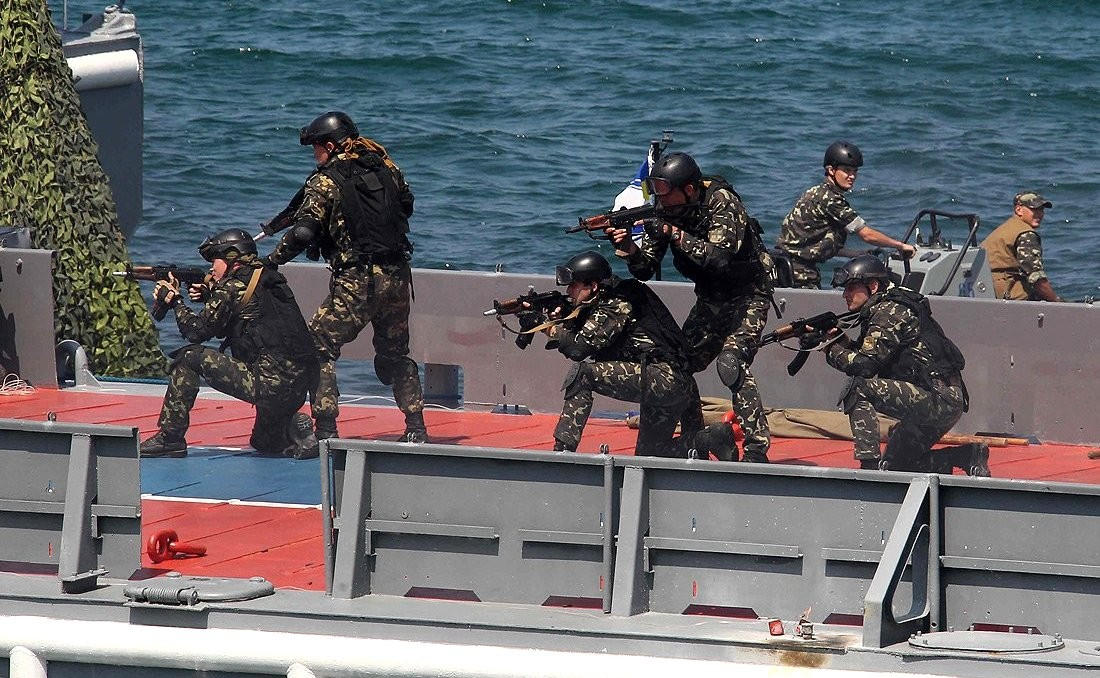
A joint exercise between the Russian and Ukrainian Navies.

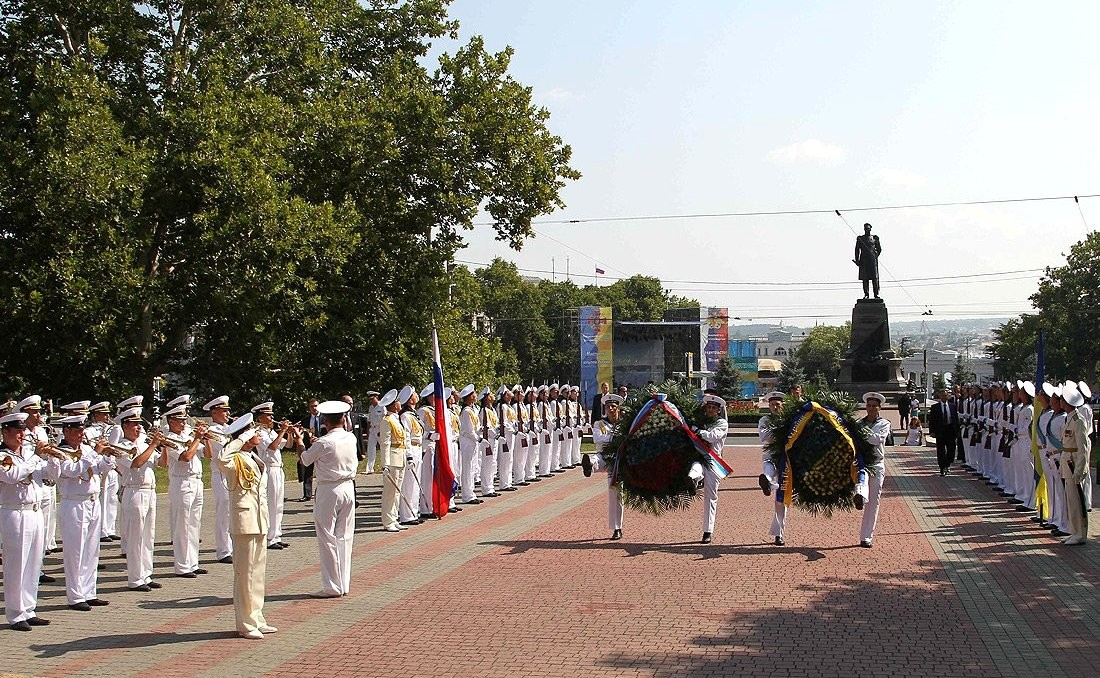
A joint Russian-Ukrainian Navy Day ceremony in the presence of Presidents Viktor Yanukovych and Vladimir Putin at the Memorial to the Heroic Defence of Sevastopol.

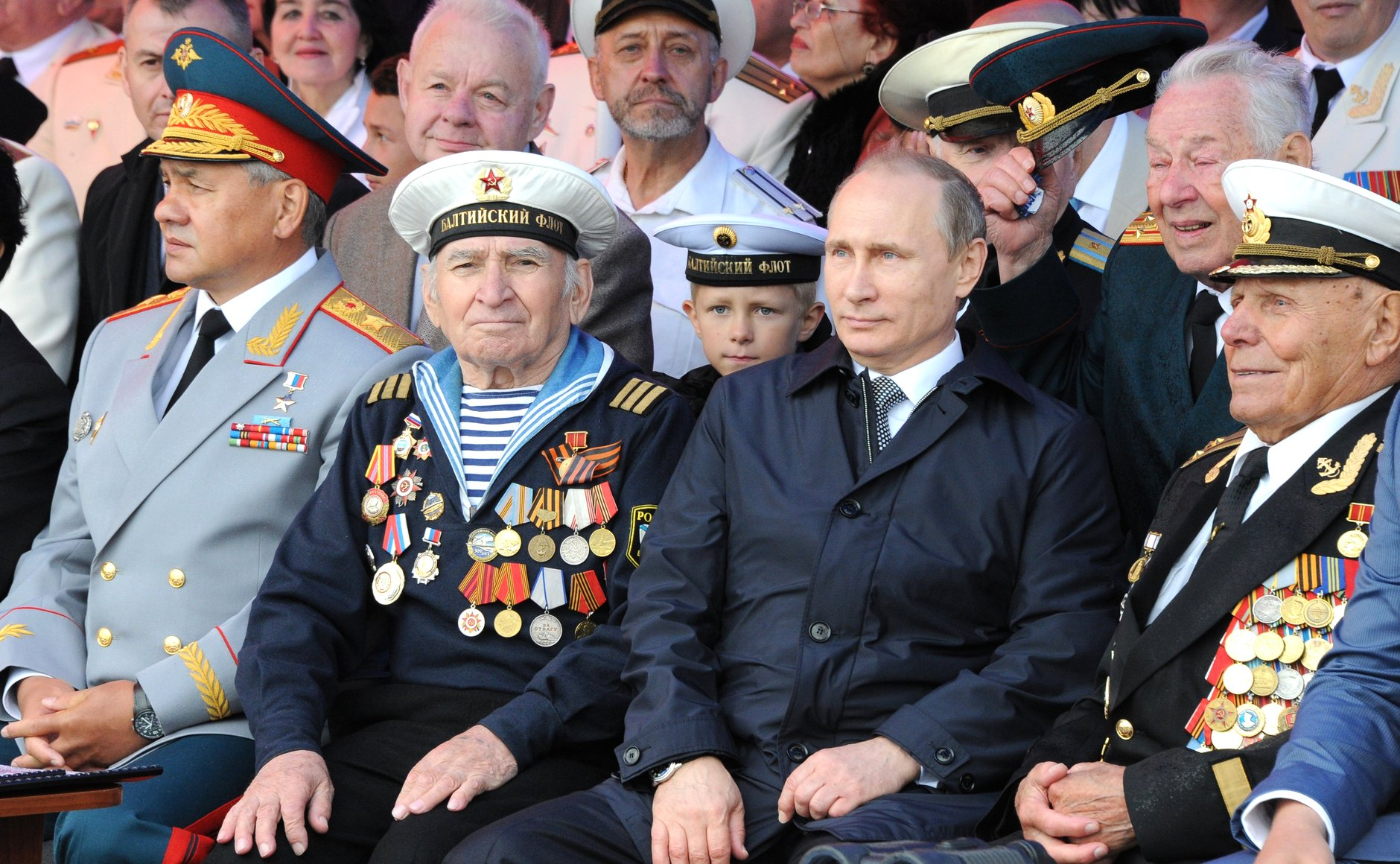
Putin at the parade in Baltiysk, 2015.

== See also ==
- Public holidays in Russia
- Navy Day (Ukraine)
- Navy Day (Turkmenistan)
