= Public holidays in Turkmenistan =

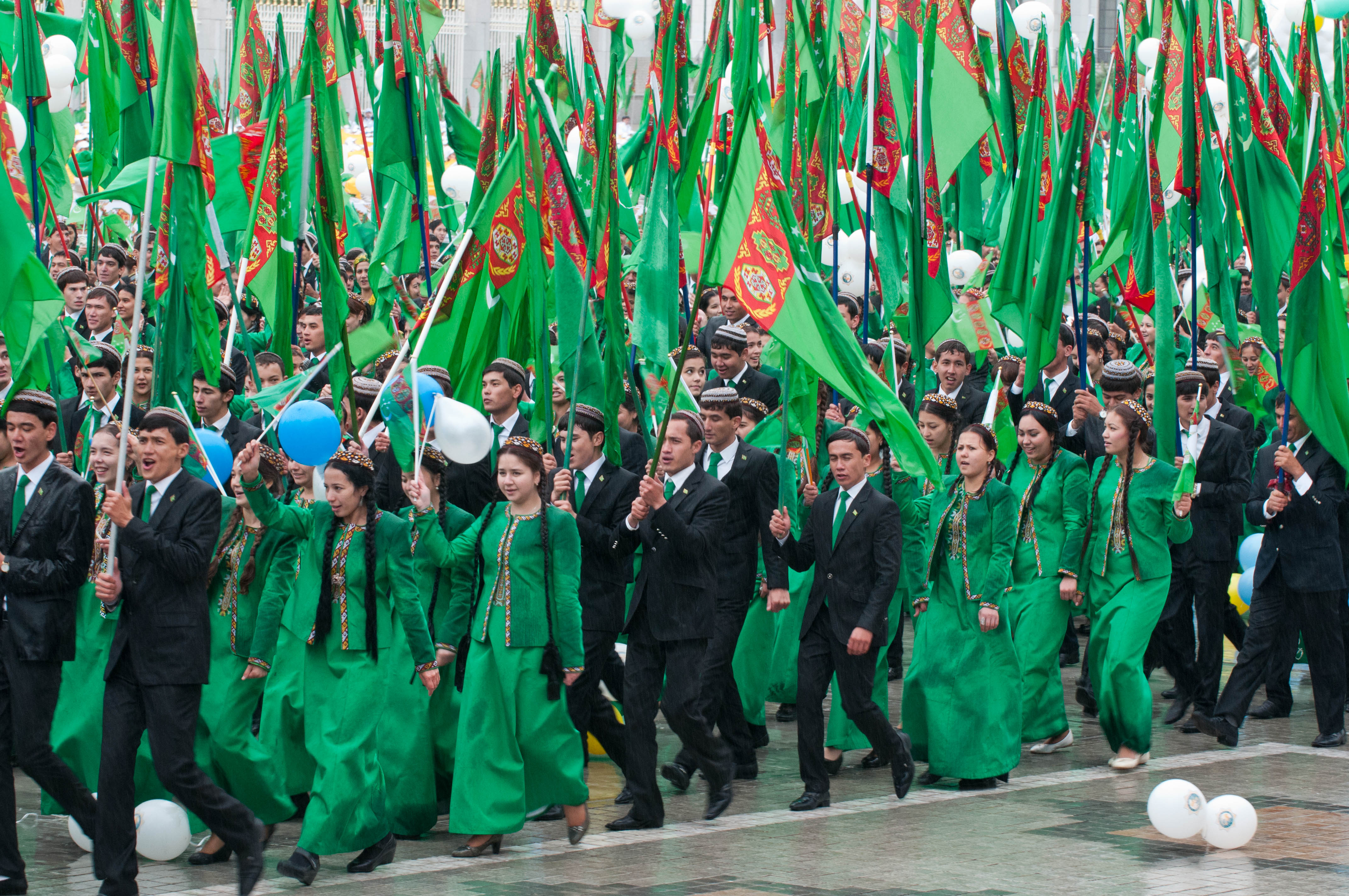
Parade during the Independence Day

Public Holidays in Turkmenistan are laid out in the Constitution of Turkmenistan, which acts as a list of nationally recognized public holidays in the country.

== Main public holidays ==
- New Year's Day (January 1)
- International Women's Day (March 8)
- Nowruz (March 21–22) (Persian New Year)
- State Flag and Constitution Day (May 18)
- Independence Day (September 27)
- Day of Remembrance (October 6)
- Day of Neutrality (December 12)
- Uraza Bayram (Shawwal 1; Gregorian date determined annually by Presidential decree)
- Kurban Bayram (Dhu al-Hijja 10; Gregorian date determined annually by Presidential decree)

== Professional holidays ==
- Memorial Day (January 12)
- Defender of the Fatherland Day (January 27)
- Turkmen Racing Horse Festival (ru: Праздник туркменского скакуна) (27 April)
- Day of Remembrance of National Heroes of Turkmenistan in the 1941-1945 World War (May 9)
- Day of Revival, Unity, and the Poetry of Magtymguly (May 18–19)
- Turkmen Carpet Day (День туркменского ковра) (last Sunday in May)
- Day of Turkmen Workers of Culture and Art (June 27)
- Third Sunday in July – Galla Bayramy (celebration of the wheat harvest)
- Day of the Ministry of Internal Affairs (May 29)
- Border Guards Day (August 11)
- Day of the Workers in the Oil, Gas, Power, and Geological Industry (second Saturday in September)
- Turkmen Bakhshi Day (second Sunday in September)
- Day of the Worker in the Organs of National Security (September 30)
- Day of the Navy (October 9)

== Other holidays ==
- Turkmen Melon Day (Second Sunday in August)
- Good Neighborliness Day (First Sunday in December)
- Day of Remembrance of the First President of Turkmenistan Saparmurat Niyazov
