= Battle of Geok Tepe =

Battle between the Russian Empire and Turkmens (1881)

Siege of Geok Tepe
- Part of the Russian conquest of Turkestan
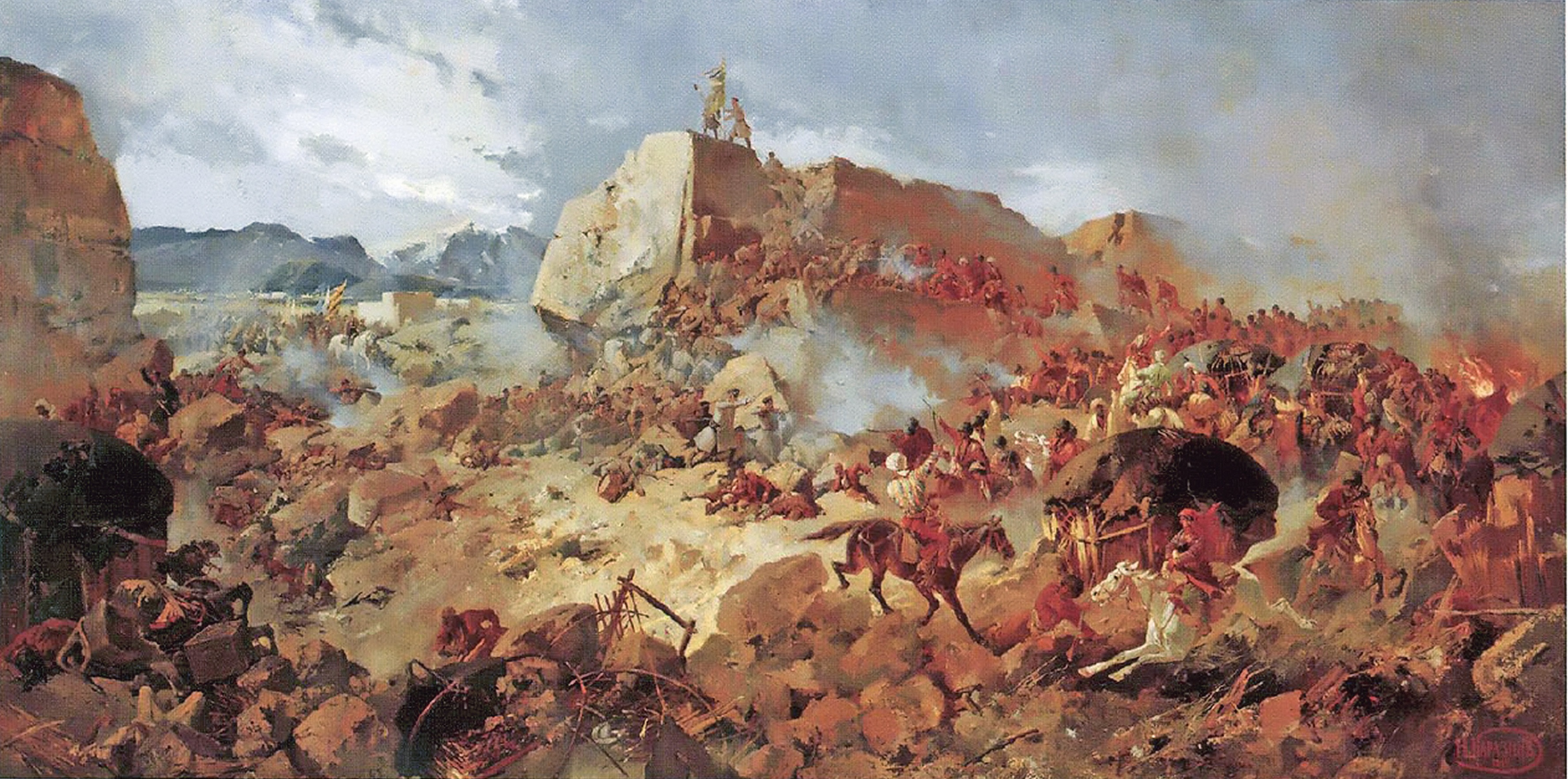
Date	December 1880 – January 1881
Location	Geok Tepe, Turkmenistan 38°09′28″N 57°57′59″E
Result	Russian victory

Belligerents
Russia	Turkmens

Commanders and leaders
(Russian Empire) Mikhail Skobelev (Russian Empire) Aleksey Kuropatkin	Ovezmurat Dykma-Serdar

Strength
7,200; 72 artillery pieces	20–25,000 people in the fortress (around 8,000 with firearms) no artillery

Casualties and losses
268 killed 669 wounded or: 59 killed, 254 wounded 645 died of disease.	15,000 defenders and civilians killed or up to 20,000 killed

The Battle of Geok Tepe in 1881 was the main event in the 1880/81 Russian campaign to conquer the Teke tribe of Turkmens. Its effect was to give the Russian Empire control over most of what is now Turkmenistan, thereby nearly completing the Russian conquest of Central Asia.

The battle is also called Denghil-Tepe or Dangil Teppe. Sources are inconsistent, but Denghil-Tepe seems to have been the name of the fort and also the name of a small hill or tumulus in the northwest corner of the fort. Geok Tepe ('Blue Hill') seems to refer to the general area, the modern town, a nearby village and a mountain to the south. Skrine says that fort enclosed 2.6 square kilometres (1 sq mi) or more, with mud walls 5.5 m (18 ft) thick and 3 m (10 ft) high on the inside and a 1.2 m (4 ft) dry ditch on the outside, although other dimensions are given. The area was part of the Akhal Oasis where streams coming down from the Kopet Dagh support irrigation agriculture.

The Russians killed all Turkmen males who had not succeeded in escaping from the fort, but spared about 5,000 women and children. They freed about 600 Persian slaves.

== Campaign and siege ==
Turkmen campaign of 1880-81
* Blue=Russian fort; Yellow=Khanate
* The Kopet Dagh Mountains run from Ashkabat northwest toward Krasnovodsk.
* Khoja Kale is the mark south of Kazil Arvat.

After Russian forces were defeated in 1879, Russia began to plan for a new campaign. The basic problem was moving up supplies since Akhal was an oasis surrounded by several hundred kilometres of semi-desert. In March 1880 Mikhail Skobelev was put in charge of the Trans-Caspian region. He adopted Lazarev's original plan of a slow and massive advance. Instead of Khoja Kale he chose a base at Bami on the north side of the Kopet Dagh. At some point he decided to take Geok Tepe by siege rather than storm. He arrived at Chikislyar in May, advanced up the Atrek and Sumbar rivers and by June 11 he occupied Bami. The build-up was slow, partly due to the shortage of camels. In July he made a reconnaissance in force to examine Geok Tepe.

By the first half of December he had enough men and supplies and moved out to occupy a fort he renamed ‘Samur’ a few kilometres west of Geok Tepe. On 27 December Aleksey Kuropatkin arrived with five companies, having made a remarkable march across the desert from Khiva. By the end of the month Skobelev had 4020 infantry, 750 cavalry as well as artillery, rockets, several machine guns and heliographs for communications.

About 40000 Tekkes were thought to be in the area. On 1 January 1881 he occupied Yanghi-Kala south of the fort to control the water supply and the following day chose the southeast corner as the point of attack and on the following day moved the main camp to Yanghi-Kala.

On 4–8 January the first parallel was built about 600 m (700 yd) from the fort and a second begun. To protect this a detachment was sent to capture a small redoubt to the north and General Petrushevich was killed after rushing through the gate. The Tekkes made sorties on the 9th, 11th and 16th.

These were largely successful, but cost many Turkoman lives. The camp was twice moved north to make it easier to deal with sorties. The Russians only had enough men to hold a siege line in the southeast corner and the Tekkes were usually allowed to move in and out on the north side of the fort. On January 18 a mine was started on the southeast side and two days later artillery made a breach in the south wall which was quickly repaired. On 23 January the mine was completed and loaded with 1,200 kg (2,600 lb) of powder.

== Battle ==
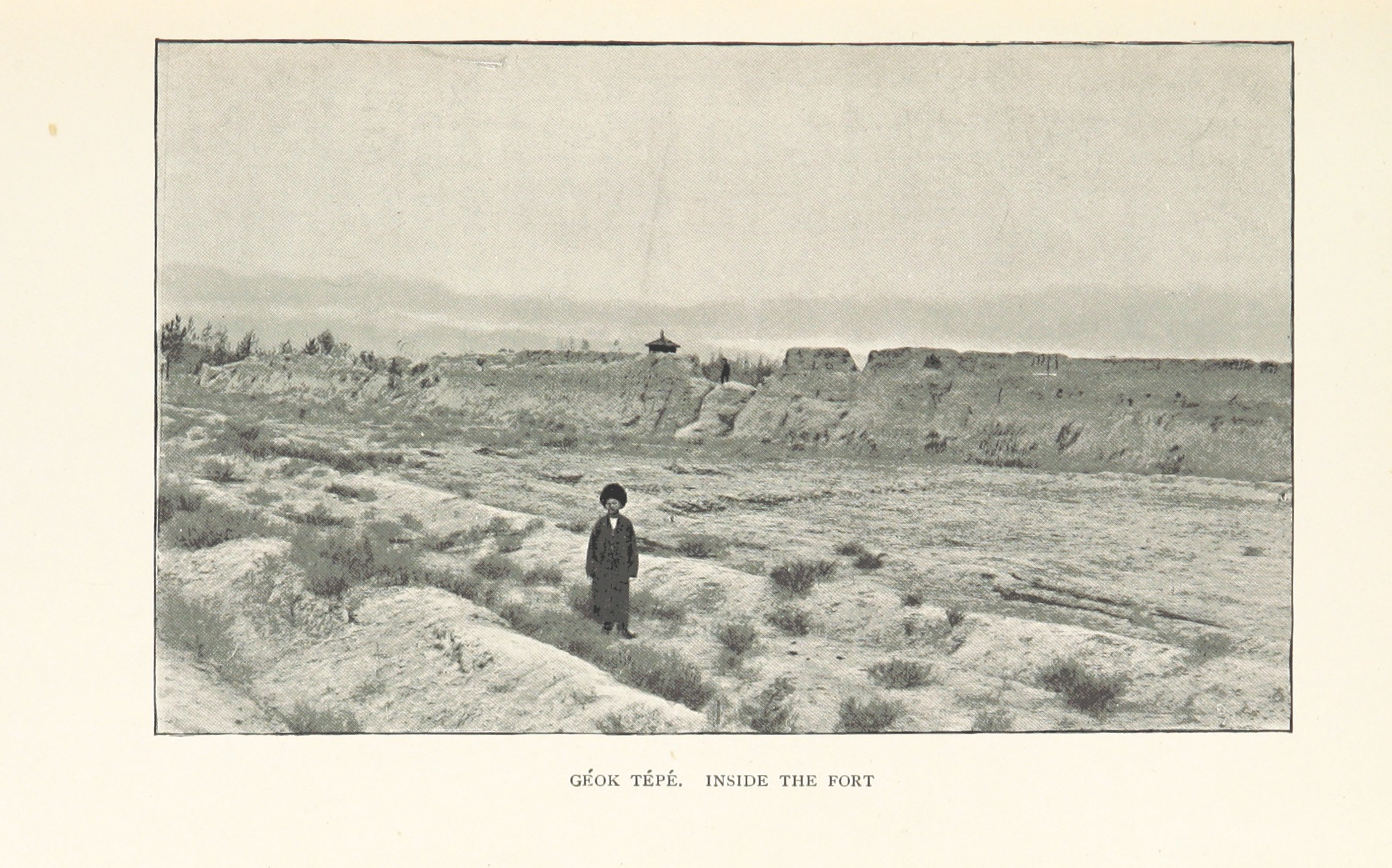
Ruins of the fort

The attack began at 07:00 on January 24. All the artillery opened up and the southern artillery started to reopen the south breach. On the west side a diversionary attack was made to capture a redoubt. The mine was exploded at 11:20 and made a 43-metre (140 ft) breach in the wall. Kuropatkin led eleven and a half companies into the breach, which was taken. At the same time Kozelkov led eight companies into the southern breach, which proved too small. They were stopped and the breach was only taken when reserves were brought up, the flanks being taken with scaling ladders.

The two groups linked up and, following instructions, began to entrench themselves. Meanwhile, the western group scaled the wall. Given this success, Skobelev reversed orders and ordered a general advance. By afternoon the hill at the northwest corner was taken and the Tekkes were fleeing over the north wall, pursued by cavalry. The pursuit continued for 16 kilometers and was only stopped by nightfall.

== Aftermath ==
For the final day's battle Skobelev reported 59 killed, 304 wounded and 85 slightly wounded. For the month of January "Indian Officer" gave 1108 Russians killed and wounded out of about 5000 engaged. Ammunition expended was 287,314 bullets, 5,864 artillery shells and 224 rockets (time period uncertain). Thousands of transport camels died during the campaign. Tekke losses were estimated at 20,000.

On 30 January the Russians moved 45 km (28 mi) southeast and took Ashgabat which was then a fairly small place. They could not go much further because of heavy losses and lack of supplies. Skobelev was removed from command, probably because of the excessive slaughter of civilians. On 6 May 1881, Transcaspia was declared an oblast of the Russian Empire under the Viceroy of the Caucasus. In September Persia signed the Treaty of Akhal formalizing the Atrek River as the border. The next Russian moves were the capture of Merv in 1884 and the push toward Panjdeh in 1885. In the 1990s a mosque was built to commemorate the siege and the defenders. In Turkmenistan the battle is remembered as a national day of mourning, and the resistance is often cited as a source of national pride.

The last paragraph of Skobelev's official report reads: "After the capture of the fortress, 6,500 bodies were buried inside it. During the pursuit 8,000 were killed." On the previous page he wrote: "In this pursuit by the dragoons and Cossacks ... the killed of both sexes amounted to 8,000 persons."

== See also ==
- Russian Turkestan
- History of Turkmenistan
- Russian conquest of Turkestan
- Aerial view of battlefield and memorial mosque 38.167286°N 57.967847°E

== Bibliography ==
- "An Indian Officer", "Russia's March towards India", Chapter XVI, 1894
- Mikhail Skobelev, "Siege and Assault of Denghil-Tepe", 1881 (official report)
