= Gökdepe =

Gökdepe Gökdepe şäheri
- City
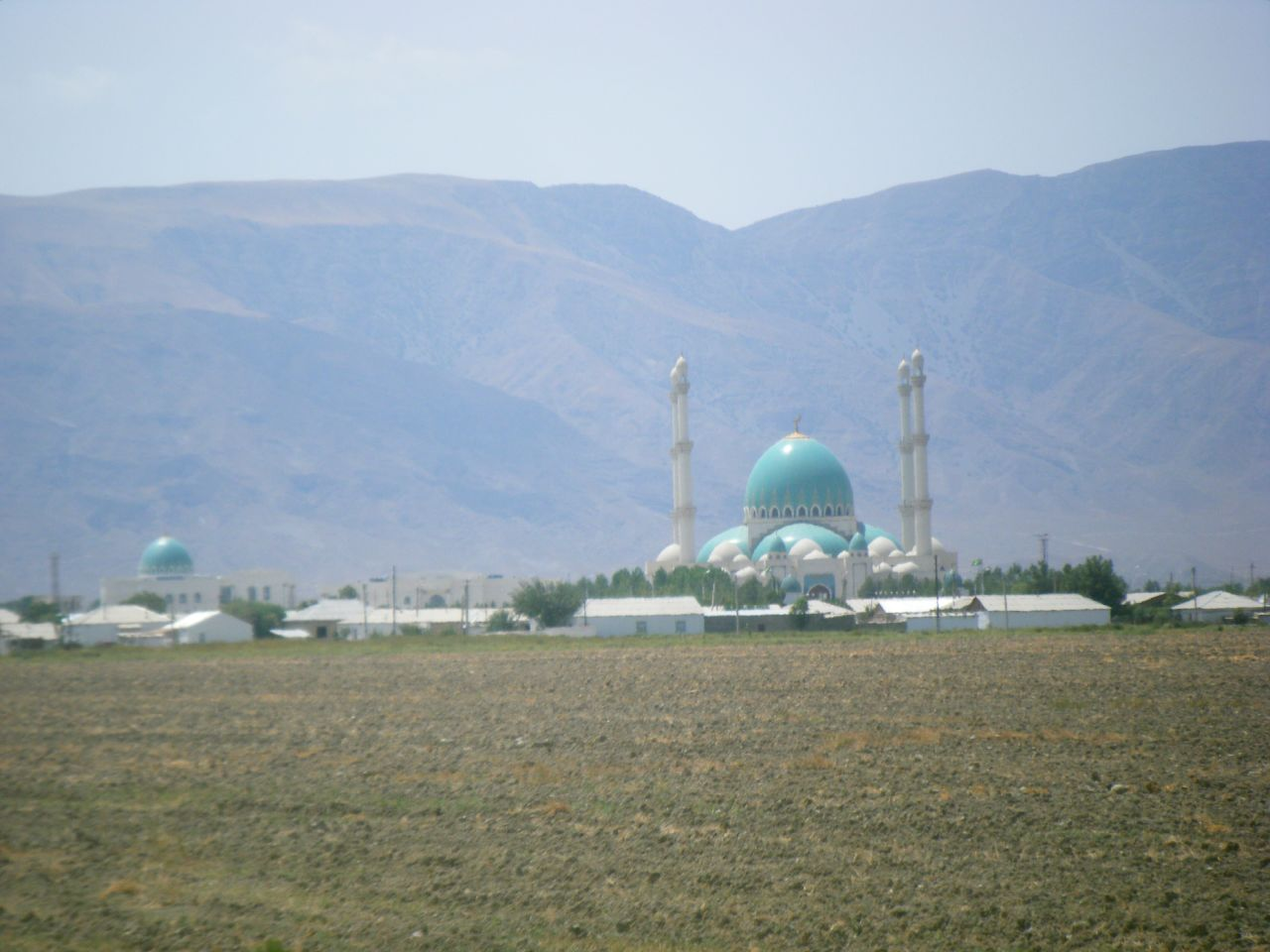
- Saparmyrat Hajji Mosque

- Location in Turkmenistan
- Coordinates: 38°09′28″N 57°57′59″E
- Country: Turkmenistan
- Province: Ahal Province
- District: Gökdepe District
- Elevation: 204 m (668 ft)

Population (2022 official census)
  - Total: 33,381
- Time zone: UTC+05:00 (TMT)
- Postal code: 745190

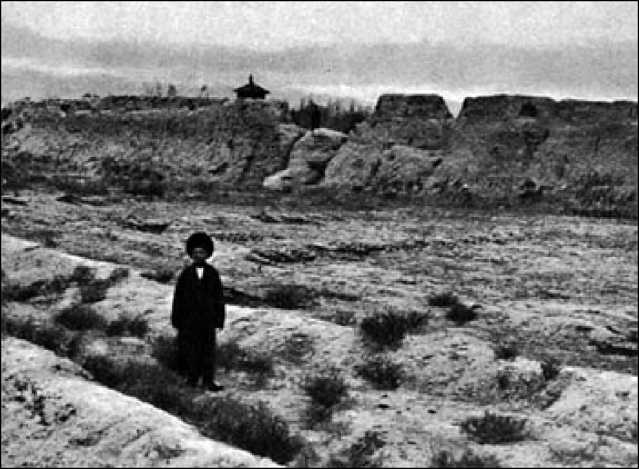
Geok Tepe in 1913

Gökdepe, previously spelled "Geok-Tepe" ("Геок-Тепе") in Russian, is a city in and the administrative center of Gökdepe District, Ahal Region, Turkmenistan, 45 kilometres (28 mi) north-west of Ashgabat. The city is built around a former fortress of the Turkmens which bore the same name. The city lies along the M37 highway and the Trans-Caspian Railway. In 2022, it had a population of 33,381 people.

== Etymology ==
The words gök depe mean "blue hill" in Turkmen. Atanyýazow explains that nearby hills in this district, as well as elsewhere in Turkmenistan, "appear to be blue-black with fog from the wind" and the settlements are named after such hills.

== History ==
=== Battle of Geok Tepe ===
The fortress of Geok Tepe consisted of a walled enclosure 2.8 km (1 3/4 mi) in circuit, the wall being 5.5 m (18 ft) high and 6 to 9 m (20 to 30 ft) thick. In December 1880 in the Siege of Geok Tepe it was attacked by 6,000 Russians under General Mikhail Skobelev against 25,000 defenders. The siege of Geok Tepe lasted 23 days, after which the fort was taken by storm. The Russian forces encountered heavy resistance and finally broke in by digging a tunnel under the wall, then detonating a mine under the wall on January 12 (24th new style), 1881. Once the fortress was breached, the Russian troops stormed in. Several hundred defenders died in the explosion, and many more died in the fighting that ensued. Eventually, the defenders, and the 40,000 civilians inside the fort, fled across the desert, pursued by General Skobelev's cavalry. Around 8,000 Turkmen soldiers and civilians died while fleeing, adding to 6,500 who had died in the fort. Russian casualties were 398 killed and 669 wounded.

== Economy ==
Gökdepe is the site of a cotton ginning mill and of the Gökdepe Textile Factory named for Hero Atamyrat Nyýazow (father of the first president of independent Turkmenistan, Saparmyrat Nyýazow). The city features two hospitals, one a general hospital and the other specializing in obstetrics and pediatrics. The city's central market, Ak Bazar, located across the M37 highway from the central train and bus stations, draws villagers from the surrounding area both to sell their wares and to purchase necessities.

== Architecture ==
The city's main architectural attraction is the Saparmyrat Hajji Mosque, completed in 1995 by order of President Nyýazow to commemorate the fallen in the Battle of Geok Tepe. The local history museum is located on the grounds of the mosque, and one floor of the museum is dedicated to the battle. The entire complex is on the southern end of the former fortress.

== Legacy ==
- Saparmyrat Hajji Mosque was built to commemorate the defeat and is noted for its mint-turquoise blue coloured roof and white marble structure
- Halk Hakydasy Memorial Complex

== See also ==
- Battle of Geok Tepe
- Battle of Geok Tepe (1879).
