= Navy Day (Turkmenistan) =

Public holiday in Turkmenistan

Day of the Navy of Turkmenistan
- Native name: Türkmenistanyň harby-deňiz güni
- Date: October 9
- Time: All day
- Location: Usually at the naval headquarters in Türkmenbaşy
- Also known as: Navy Day
- Type: Naval Holiday
- Participants: President of Turkmenistan; Commander of the Navy; Minister of Defense of Turkmenistan
- It is commonly celebrated with a naval parade or an awards ceremony.

The Day of the Navy of Turkmenistan (Turkmen: Türkmenistanyň harby-deňiz güni) is an official holiday of Turkmenistan. It was established in 2011 following an appeal by defense minister Yaylym Berdiyev to President Gurbanguly Berdimuhamedow. It was set on 9 October in honor of the presidential working visit to one of the military units located in a suburb in the city of Turkmenbashi. It is celebrated on October 9 and honors the founding of the Turkmen Naval Forces.

== Navy Day 2013 ==
In 2013, President Gurbanguly Berdimuhamedov made a working trip to Balkan province, where he met with the officers of the military units of the Ministry of Defence, seamen and cadets of the Navy.

== Navy Day 2015 ==
In 2015, President Berdimuhamedov inaugurated new buildings of Naval Institute in Turkmenbashi on the occasion of Navy Day. Following the inauguration ceremony, he held an enlarged meeting of the State Security Council of Turkmenistan at the conference hall of the institute. Berdimuhamedov announced that the first Turkmen naval parade will be held in the western region of the country. He also announced the establishment of the first ever garrison of the Naval Forces in the Caspian Sea. After the meeting of the State Security Council, he went to the local sea port where he took part in the ceremony of launching a new special warship and viewed the festive procession of the fleet in its waters. Defence Minister Berdiyev was also promoted to the rank of Colonel General.

== See also ==
- Public holidays in Turkmenistan
- Navy Day (Russia)
