= Chandyr River =

River in Iran and Turkmenistan

The Chandyr River (Persian: رود چاندیر) is a tributary of the Atrek River. It originates in the Kopet Dag mountains in Iran and joins the Atrek River in Turkmenistan.

== See also ==
- Sumbar River
