= Sarısu, Beylagan =

Village in Beylagan Rayon, Azerbaijan

Sarısu is a village and municipality in the Beylagan Rayon of Azerbaijan. It has a population of 635.
