= Sari Su, Iran =

Sari Su ساري سو
- Village
- Location within Iran
- Coordinates: 39°20′11″N 44°55′48″E
- Country: Iran
- Province: West Azerbaijan
- County: Poldasht
- Bakhsh: Central
- Rural District: Chaybasar-e Sharqi

Population (2006)
  - Total: 234
- Time zone: UTC+3:30 (IRST)
  - Summer (DST): UTC+4:30 (IRDT)

Sari Su (Persian: ساري سو, also Romanized as Sārī Sū; also known as Sarasu) is a village in Chaybasar-e Sharqi Rural District, in the Central District of Poldasht County, West Azerbaijan Province, Iran. At the 2006 census, its population was 234, in 42 families.
