= Sarısu, Imishli =

Sarısu
- Location within Azerbaijan
- Coordinates: 40°03′N 48°15′E
- Country: Azerbaijan
- Rayon: Imishli
- Time zone: UTC+4 (AZT)
  - Summer (DST): UTC+5 (AZT)

Sarısu is a village in the Imishli Rayon of Azerbaijan.
