= Sumbar River =

River in Iran and Turkmenistan

The Sumbar (also Sari-su, Sara-su and Ṣáríṣú) is a fast flowing river in southern Turkmenistan and northern Iran. It is a tributary of the Atrek. The name Sari-su means yellow water in Turkic languages, but is applied to a number of other rivers as well. It used to be an area for Caspian tigers in Turkmenistan, until the last individual was killed in January 1954.

== Geography ==
The Sumbar is 245 kilometres (152 mi) long and drains a basin of 8,300 square kilometres (3,200 sq mi). It arises in the Kopet Dag mountains in Iran and flows into Turkmenistan. For a long stretch before the Sumbar runs into the Atrek, it is separated from the latter by a range of hills called the Marábeh. The Atrek becomes part of the Turkmenistan-Iran border where the Sumbar flows into it, at 37°59′28″N 55°16′29″E.

== See also ==
- Chandyr River
- Battle of Geok Tepe (1879)
