= Saparmyrat Hajji Mosque =

Mosque in Gökdepe, Turkmenistan

- Saparmyrat Hajy metjidi (Turkmen)

Religion
- Affiliation: Islam

Location
- Location: Gökdepe, Turkmenistan
- Interactive map of Saparmyrat Hajji Mosque
- Coordinates: 38.16212°N 57.96729°E

Architecture
- Architect: Kakajan Durdyev
- Type: Mosque
- Style: Islamic
- Completed: 1995

Specifications
- Capacity: 8000
- Minaret: 4
- Minaret height: 63

The Saparmyrat Hajji (Turkmen: Saparmyrat Hajy metjidi) is a mosque in Gökdepe, Turkmenistan. Commissioned in memory of the defenders of Gökdepe Fortress, it was built between 1994 and 1995, during the presidency of President Saparmyrat Nyýazow. The mosque—with its blue dome and four minarets—is a prominent landmark in Gökdepe.

== History ==
Ashgabat architect Kakajan Durdyyev designed the structure. The mosque was opened in 1995 and named in honour of President of Turkmenistan Saparmyrat Nyýazow's Hajj in 1992. The tender went to Bouygues in 1994, who had the mosque built in one year. (Note: Bouygues has been involved in multiple construction projects at Turkmenistan, and has attracted criticism for it.)

In 2008, Turkish firm SUR Turizm Inşaat Ticaret ve sanayi LTD STI renovated the mosque, and additionally designed and built ritual banquet facilities with capacity of 1,000 guests plus the Gökdepe National Museum located on the mosque's grounds. The contract included landscaping of the surrounding territory. The cost of reconstruction plus building the banquet hall and museum was cited as $34 million.

== Architecture ==
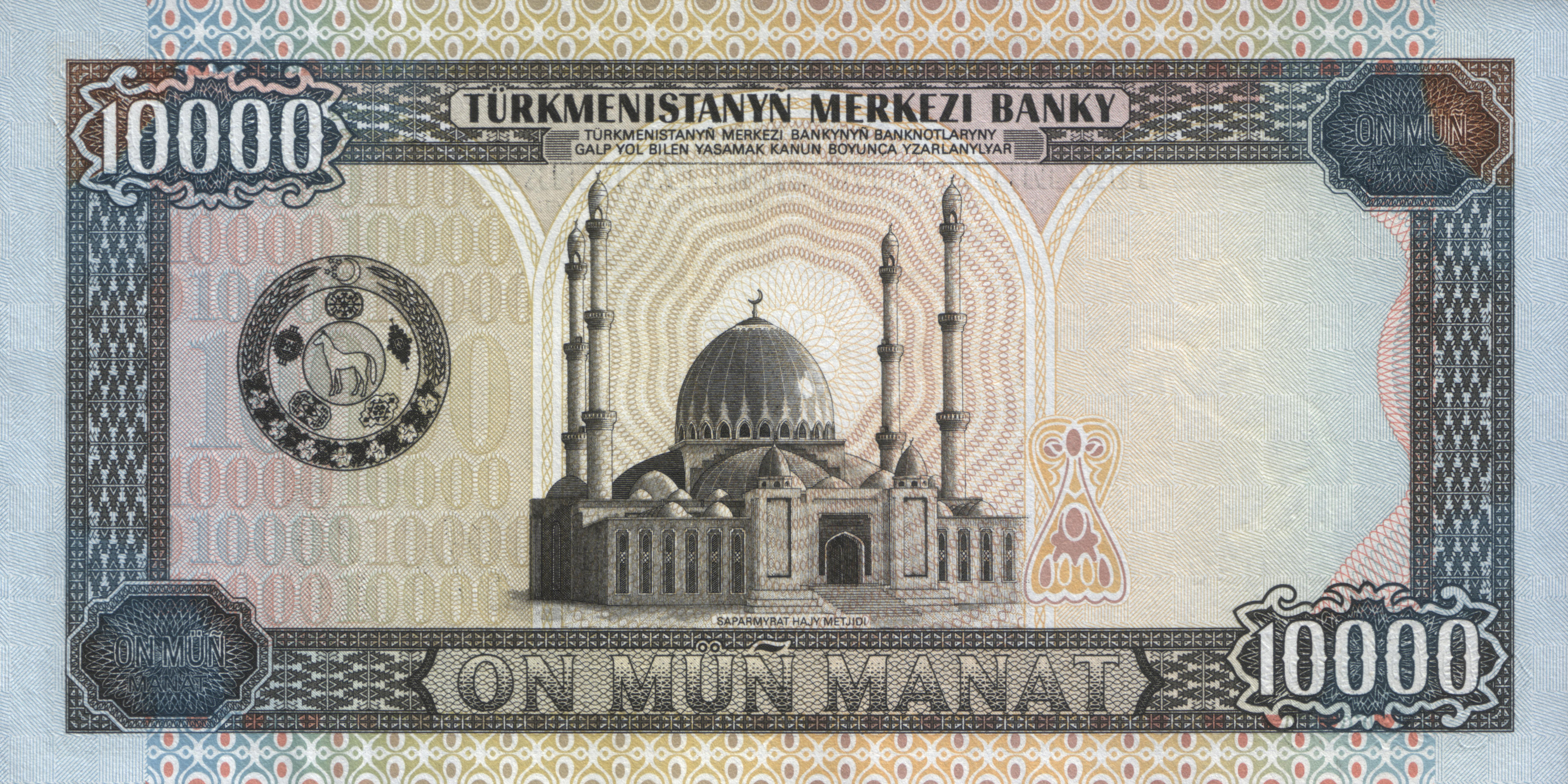
Saparmurat Hajji Mosque featured on 10,000 manat banknote.

The mosque has a dark green dome in the center, surrounded by four half-domes of lower height but same shade. The interior of the mosque is a square hall—extending outside to a square courtyard. Four minarets, each having a height of 63 meters, were installed at the four corners of this courtyard to represent the age of Muhammad. (Note: Muhammad died aged 61–62. When he died he was around 61 in Kameri calendar, and 63 in Hijri Islamic calendar.) Adjacent to the mosque in the east, is a two-floored complex centered around a star-shaped pool. Small white domes adorn the perimeter of the complex's ceiling as well as the mosque courtyard.

A chandelier—having 260 lamps—hangs from the center of the mosque. The walls are embossed with motifs of traditional Turkmen carpets while the interior of all domes are decorated with pastel blue designs. The mosque is reported to have a capacity for 8,000 worshipers.

== See also ==
- Islam in Turkmenistan
- Islamic architecture
- List of mosques
- Türkmenbaşy Ruhy Mosque
