= Atrek =

River in Iran and Turkmenistan

Atrek Attrack
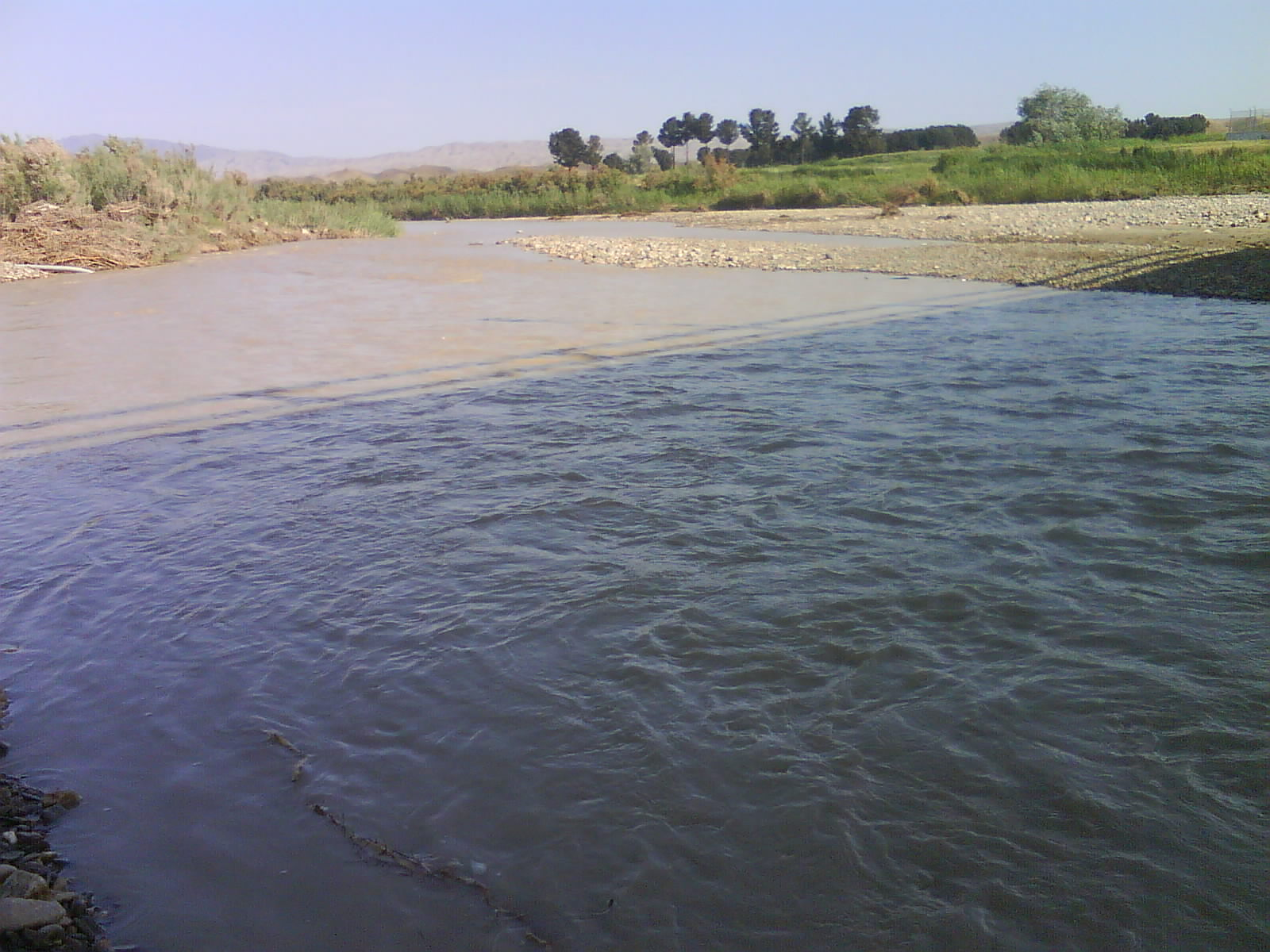

- Location within Iran
- Native name: اَترک (Persian)

Physical characteristics
- Source
  - location: North-eastern Iran
  - coordinates: 37°10′N 59°00′E)
- Length: 563 km (350 mi)
- Basin size: 27,300 square kilometres

The Atrek (Persian: اترک, Kurdish: Etrek, Turkmen: Etrek), also known as the Attrack, Atrak, and Etrek, is a fast-moving river which begins in the mountains of north-eastern Iran (37°10′N 59°00′E) and flows 563 kilometres (350 mi) westward, draining into the south-eastern corner of the Caspian Sea in Turkmenistan. Because of the high use of its waters for irrigation, the Atrek only flows into the Caspian when it is in its flood stage.

== Geography ==
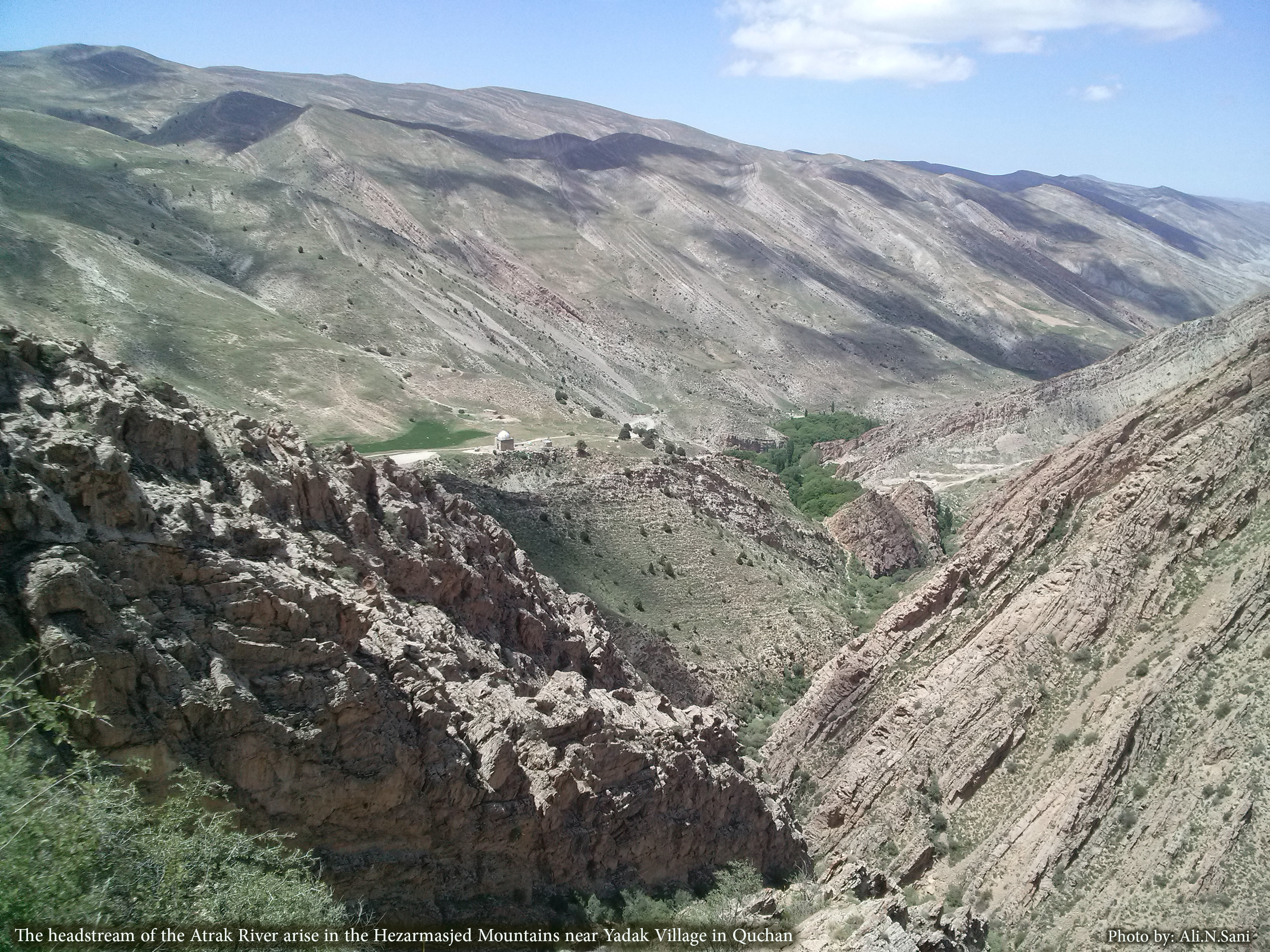
Atrek river headstream

The Atrek is 669 kilometres (416 mi) long and drains a basin of 27,300 square kilometres (10,500 mi^{2}).

== Politics ==
Beginning at 37°59′28″N 55°16′29″E, where its tributary the Sumbar joins it, the river forms the border of Iran with Turkmenistan; this helped keep the area closed throughout the Cold War years. A 1957 treaty between Iran and the USSR assigns equal rights to 50% of the water of the frontier parts of the Atrek. The same treaty also applies to the Aras River, which now forms part of the border between Iran and Azerbaijan.

== Ecology ==
Even though sturgeons concentrate in the area of the Caspian Sea next to the Turkmen coast, they do not currently migrate into the Atrek River owing to its low water level and pollution. Since the Atrek is the only Caspian watershed river of the Turkmen coast, sturgeons no longer reproduce in Turkmenistan.

== See also ==
- Chandyr River
