= Al-Idah fi Ulum al-Balagha =

Arabic Rhetorical work

The Elucidation of the Sciences of Rhetoric
- Editor: Ibrahim Shams al-Din
- Author: Jalāl al-Dīn al-Qazwīnī
- Original title: الإيضاح في علوم البلاغة
- Language: Arabic
- Subject: Arabic rhetoric
- Publisher: Dar al-Kotob al-'Ilmiyya
- Publication date: 2023
- Publication place: Beirut, Lebanon
- Pages: 416
- ISBN: 978-2-7451-3907-8

Al-Īḍāḥ fī ʿUlūm al-Balāgha (Arabic: الإيضاح في علوم البلاغة, romanized: The Elucidation of the Sciences of Rhetoric) is a major work of Arabic rhetorical theory authored by Jalāl al-Dīn al-Qazwīnī (d. 739 AH / 1338 CE). The book serves as both a commentary and a comprehensive elaboration on his earlier work, Talkhīṣ al-Miftāḥ, which itself was a condensed reworking of the rhetorical section of al-Sakkākī's Miftāḥ al-ʿUlūm. While the Talkhīṣ was intended as a teaching digest, al-Īḍāḥ provides deeper theoretical explanations, corrections, and critical reflections on the rules and categories of Arabic rhetoric.

== Content ==
The author distinguished his book through thorough investigation, leaving no topic—major or minor—of rhetoric unaddressed. He presented each issue in a detailed and precise manner, encompassing all opinions related to it, whether from his own time or from earlier periods. Jalāl al-Dīn al-Qazwīnī said in the book's introduction:

“This is a book on the science of rhetoric and its related subjects. I have named it al-Idāḥ (The Elucidation) and arranged it according to the structure of my abridgment, which I titled Talkhīṣ al-Miftāḥ (The Summary of the Key). I have elaborated upon it to serve as a commentary for that work: clarifying its difficult parts, explaining its concise meanings, and adding material omitted from the abridgment that is found in Miftāḥ al-ʿUlūm (The Key to the Sciences). I have also included what al-Miftāḥ left out from the writings of the great Imam 'Abd al-Qāhir al-Jurjānī (may Allah have mercy on him), in his books Dalāʾil al-Iʿjāz (Proofs of Inimitability) and Asrār al-Balāgha (Secrets of Eloquence), along with whatever else I could examine from the words of others. I extracted the essence of all this, refined and organized it until everything was placed in its proper place. I also added my own insights—what my mind arrived at and I did not find in the works of others. Thanks to Allah, the result is a comprehensive work that gathers together the scattered elements of this science. I sincerely hope it benefits those with understanding who read it. Allah is sufficient for me, and He is the best disposer of affairs.”

The text combines exposition with critique, functioning not just as a commentary but as an independent contribution to rhetorical theory. It was often used in tandem with the Talkhīṣ, allowing students to balance memorization with detailed understanding.

== Editions ==
The work has since been published in multiple modern editions. Notable among them is the 2008 Beirut edition by Dār al-Kitāb al-ʿArabī ISBN 9953272573, edited by Muḥammad ʿAbd al-Munʿim Khafājī, and a more recent two-volume edition by Dār al-Nūr al-Mubīn (Amman, 2023).

== See also ==
- Talkhis al-Miftah
- List of Sunni books
