= Al-Isfahani =

The name Al-Isfahani is a nisba indicating someone from the city of Isfahan, Iran.

People with this name include:

- Hamza al-Isfahani (d. 961), Persian historian
- Abu al-Faraj al-Isfahani (d. 967), Arab historian and author of Kitāb al-Aghānī
- Abu Bakr al-Isfahani (d. 908), Persian scholar in Warsh recitation
- Abu Nu'aym al-Isfahani (d. 1038), Shafi'i hadith scholar who wrote the most important source for the early development of Sufism
- Abu al-Fath al-Isfahani, in full Abu-l-Fath Mahmud ibn Mohammed ibn Qasim ibn Fadl al-Isfahani, a 10th-century Persian mathematician
- Al-Raghib al-Isfahani (d.1108/1109), an Islamic scholar
- Husayni Isfahani, in full Ghiyath al-Din 'Ali ibn Amirin al-Husayni al-Isfahani, a 15th-century Persian physician and scientist from Isfahan
- Imad al-Din al-Isfahani, a 12th-century historian
- Jalal al-Din Muhammad al-Isfahani, a 19th-century Persian physician from Isfahan

== See also ==
- Isfahan (disambiguation)
- Isfahani, alternative form of the surname
- Esfahani, alternative form of the surname
- Esfahani accent, modern Persian dialect of Isfahan
- Ispahani family, a business family
