= Miftah al-Ulum =

13th-century Arabic textbook

The Key to the Disciplines
- Author: Abū Yaʿqūb Yūsuf al-Sakkākī
- Original title: مفتاح العلوم
- Language: Arabic
- Subject: Arabic rhetoric, Arabic grammar
- Publisher: Dar al-Kotob al-'Ilmiyya
- Publication date: 2000
- Publication place: Beirut, Lebanon
- Pages: 846
- ISBN: 2745114689

Miftāḥ al-ʿUlūm (Arabic: مفتاح العلوم, romanized: The Key to the Disciplines) is a 13th-century Arabic textbook authored by Abū Yaʿqūb Yūsuf al-Sakkākī (d. 626/1229). It is most notable for codifying Arabic rhetoric into a systematic structure and became one of the most influential rhetorical texts in Islamic intellectual history. The work comprises three main sections: morphology (ṣarf), syntax (naḥw), and rhetoric (balāghah), with the third section having the most lasting scholarly legacy.

== Overview ==
The structure of Miftāḥ al-ʿUlūm reflects a pedagogical approach to avoiding errors in Arabic through three fields:

- Ilm al-ṣarf to avoid mistakes in isolated words (mufrad).
- Ilm al-naḥw to avoid syntactic errors (taʾlīf).
- Ilm al-maʿānī and ʿilm al-bayān to avoid improper or contextually unfitting usage (al-wājib).

== Methodology ==
Imam Sirāj al-Dīn al-Sakkākī is recognized as one of the leading scholars of the Arabic language, distinguished by his command of its various disciplines. His celebrated work, Miftāḥ al-ʿUlūm (The Key to the Sciences), represents a remarkable contribution to linguistic scholarship, as it brings together a wide range of linguistic sciences in a single framework. Yet, despite his breadth of expertise, al-Sakkākī's reputation remained largely confined to the field of rhetoric, where his influence was most strongly felt.

In Miftāḥ al-ʿUlūm, al-Sakkākī follows the established scholarly practice of grounding grammatical rules in textual evidence. His sources include the Quran, Hadith, poetry, and prose, each differing in frequency and importance. Quranic citations occupy a central role in his arguments, with al-Sakkākī even drawing upon variant readings where necessary. While he does employ Hadith as supporting evidence, their use is comparatively limited, reflecting his limited expertise in Hadith studies a gap that at times led to errors in attribution or authenticity.

By contrast, poetry forms the cornerstone of al-Sakkākī's evidential method. In line with earlier grammarians, he frequently quotes full verses or extracts, occasionally naming the poet and at other times leaving the source unmentioned. Proverbs and wise sayings also appear in his work, though they play a more minor role than poetry.

== Content ==
=== Literary Foundations ===
Sakkākī's rhetorical theory in Miftāḥ al-ʿUlūm is built upon the earlier works of ʿAbd al-Qāhir al-Jurjānī, especially Dalāʾil al-Iʿjāz and Asrār al-Balāghah. Though al-Jurjānī offered many of the core insights of Arabic rhetoric, he did not systematize them. Sakkākī restructured these insights into a methodological textbook, giving the rhetorical sciences clear categorization and functional hierarchy.

Additionally, al-Sakkākī's Miftāḥ al-ʿUlūm also built upon Fakhr al-Dīn al-Rāzī's Nihāyat al-Iʿjāz fī Dirāyat al-Iʿjāz (“The Ultimate in Concision Concerning the Inimitability of Qurʾānic Style”), itself indebted to the pioneering works of the 11th-century master ʿAbd al-Qāhir al-Jurjānī. Additionally, al-Rāzī's systematic engagement with al-Jurjānī’s rhetorical theories provided a crucial intermediary step.

Al-Sakkākī was also deeply influenced by the works of al-Zamakhsharī (d. 538/1144), particularly his Qurʾānic commentary al-Kashshāf ʿan Ḥaqāʾiq al-Tanzīl which provided a sophisticated application of rhetorical analysis to Qurʾānic exegesis.

=== Triadic System of Rhetoric ===
Al-Sakkākī (d. 626/1229) is often credited as the pioneer who systematized the science of balāgha into its canonical tripartite division:

1. Ilm al-Maʿānī
2. Ilm al-Bayan
3. Ilm al-Badīʿ

In his seminal work Miftāḥ al-ʿUlūm, he not only consolidated earlier rhetorical discussions but also provided the framework that later scholars adopted as the standard organization of Arabic rhetoric. Through this formulation, al-Sakkākī transformed disparate insights on eloquence into a coherent discipline that shaped subsequent rhetorical scholarship.

== Legacy ==
The third section on rhetoric became a core curriculum text in the Islamic world, especially in the Ottoman Empire, where madrasahs named “Miftāḥ Madrasahs” were inspired by the text's title. Jalāl al-Dīn al-Qazwīnī later abridged al-Sakkākī's Miftāḥ al-‘Ulūm in his celebrated Talkhīṣ al-Miftāḥ, which became a standard reference in rhetoric. He also authored a further commentary, al-Idāḥ fī ‘Ulūm al-Balāgha, to expand and clarify its discussions.

== Edition ==
A single manuscript of Miftāḥ al-ʿUlūm (catalogue no. 7843/IV) is preserved in the collection of the Abu Rayḥān Bīrūnī Centre of Oriental Manuscripts at the Tashkent State University of Oriental Studies. This copy was transcribed in 1813 by Muḥammad Āshūr ibn Qurbān Muḥammadī Kulābī. With the rise of Arabic printing, the work saw multiple published editions:

- Cairo, al-Maṭbaʿa al-Bahiyya, 1318 AH / 1900 CE. One of the earliest printed editions, lithographically produced.
- Beirut, Dar al-Kotob al-'Ilmiyya, 2000. A critical reprint of the text in modern typeset. ISBN 2745114689.
- Beirut, Dar al-Kotob al-'Ilmiyya, 2014 (4th ed.). Edited by ʿAbd al-Ḥamīd Hindāwī. Hardcover, 846 pp., ISBN 978-2745130181.
