= Jalal al-Din Mohammad =

Jalal al-Din Mohammad is a male Muslim name of Arabic origin, formed from the name Jalal with the suffix ad-Din and the name Mohammad. The first part of the name may also be written as Jalaluddin, Jamal al-Din, in addition to various other ways.

Notable people with the name include:

- Jalal-ud-Din Muhammad Akbar (1542–1605), Mughal emperor
- Jalāl al-Dīn Muḥammad Rūmī (1207–1273), Sufi mystic and poet
- Jamal al-Din Muhammad, Burid ruler of Damascus
- Jamal al-Din Muhammad Isfahani, Iranian poet and painter
- Jalaluddin Muhammad Shah, seventh Sultan of Bengal
- Jalal al-Din Muhammad al-Isfahani, 19th-century Persian physician
- Jalal al-Din Mohammad Tabrizi, Safavid aristocrat and vizier (advisor)

== See also ==
- Jalal ad-Din
