= Oguz =

Oguz may refer to:

- Oğuz (name), a Turkish name
- Oghuz Rayon, (Azerbaijani: Oğuz), an administrative division of Azerbaijan
- Oğuz, a city, municipality and capital of Oghuz Rayon, Azerbaijan
- Oğuzlar, a Turkic nomad tribe

== See also ==
- Oghuz (disambiguation)
