= Talkhis al-Miftah =

Arabic Rhetorical work

The Digest of the Key
- Editor: Dr. Ḍiyāʾ al-Dīn ʿAbd al-Ghanī al-Ṭāliṣh
- Author: Jalāl al-Dīn al-Qazwīnī
- Original title: تلخيص المفتاح
- Language: Arabic
- Subject: Arabic rhetoric
- Publisher: Dār al-Lubāb
- Publication date: 2021
- Publication place: Istanbul, Turkey
- Pages: 424

Talkhīṣ al-Miftāḥ (Arabic: تلخيص المفتاح, romanized: The Digest of the Key) is a seminal 14th-century Arabic treatise on rhetoric (balāgha), authored by the renowned scholar Jalāl al-Dīn al-Qazwīnī (d. 739 AH / 1338 CE). The work is an abridgment of the third section of al-Sakkākī's Miftāḥ al-ʿUlūm, focusing exclusively on the rhetorical sciences. Al-Qazwīnī aimed to streamline al-Sakkākī's often difficult and complex exposition into a clearer, more pedagogical format. The text became one of the most influential manuals in the teaching of Arabic rhetoric throughout the post-classical Islamic world until modern times.

== Content ==
Talkhīṣ al-Miftāḥ (The Digest of the Key's) is a pedagogical reworking of the rhetorical section of Miftāḥ al-ʿUlūm by al-Sakkākī. Composed in the early 14th century, al-Qazwīnī's work does not simply summarize its predecessor; it reframes, reorganizes, and condenses the material, creating what scholars describe as a de facto novel understanding of Arabic rhetoric.

The text focuses exclusively on the third section of al-Sakkākī’s work—the science of rhetoric (ʿilm al-balāgha)—and omits the sections on logic and grammar. Al-Qazwīnī’s goal, as stated in the introduction, was to counteract the prolixity of al-Sakkākī’s presentation by producing a concise and memorizable text. This heavy condensation, however, often comes at the cost of clarity and accessibility, making the Talkhīṣ difficult to interpret without extensive commentary.

Despite this, the work is meticulously structured, presenting rhetorical theory in a format suitable for rote learning within the madrasa system. Its dense form was intentionally designed for use in a highly disciplined educational environment, requiring students to rely on memorization and explanatory glosses.

== Legacy ==
Talkhīṣ al-Miftāḥ became the most influential textbook of Arabic rhetoric in the Islamic world, from the later Middle Ages through to the modern times. It was widely adopted as a core text in the madrasa curriculum, not only for its conciseness but also for its authority in codifying the rhetorical sciences. Its concise style, logical organization, and instructional clarity led to it becoming more influential than its parent text (Miftāḥ al-ʿUlūm).

A wide range of commentaries and glosses were written on the Talkhīṣ, most notably:

- Al-Qazwīnī's own Al-Īḍāḥ fī ʿUlūm al-Balāgha, which served as a companion commentary.
- al-Taftāzānī (d. 792/1390), whose al-Mutawwal, an extended commentary that became a standard reference.
- Interlinear Persian and Ottoman Turkish glosses, showing its instructional use across linguistic boundaries.

These commentaries were essential for interpreting the often densely packed and elliptical prose of the Talkhīṣ. Its structure became the blueprint for teaching balāgha in pre-modern Islamic education, securing its place as a canonical work. According to modern research on Ottoman's Madrasah education: “It was almost the sole conduit for bringing al-Jurjānī's ideas out of 11th-century Iran and into all parts of the Islamic world.”

== Manuscript Tradition and Editions ==
The work has been preserved through multiple manuscripts and printed editions. Notably, the Library of Congress/WDL digital copy shows an 1884 Beirut edition, affirming its historical circulation and continued relevance. Other manuscript witnesses are held in Cambridge and Bodleian libraries, revealing its broad scholarly dissemination.

== See also ==
- Al-Idah fi Ulum al-Balagha
- List of Sunni books
