= Oğuzhan (disambiguation) =

Oğuzhan may refer to:

- Oğuzhan, a Turkish masculine given name
- Oghuz Khagan, a legendary and semi-mythological Turkic leader
- Oguzhan District, a district of Mary Province, Turkmenistan

== See also ==
- Oghuz (disambiguation)
