= Jaloliddin =

Jaloliddin may refer to:

- Jalal al-Din Mangburni
- Jaloliddin Masharipov
- Jaloliddin Balkhi District

== See also ==
- Jalal ad-Din
