= Oghuz =

Oghuz or Oğuz may refer to:

- an early Turkic word for 'tribe', see Oghuz (tribe)
- Oghuz languages, southwestern branch of the Turkic language family
- Oghuz Turks, the Turkic groups speaking Oghuz languages
- Oghuz Khan, a legendary and semi-mythological Turkic khan
- Oğuz (name), a Turkish masculine given name
- Oghuz Rayon, an administrative district of Azerbaijan
- Oghuz (city), a city, municipality and capital of Oghuz Rayon, Azerbaijan
- Oğuz, Buldan, a village in the Buldan District, Turkey
- Oğuz, Beşiri, a village in the Beşiri District, Turkey
- Dara, Artuklu, a village in Turkey formerly known as Oğuz

== See also ==
- Oğuzhan (disambiguation)
