= Isfahan (disambiguation) =

Isfahan is a city in Iran.

Isfahan or Esfahan may also refer to:

- Isfahan County, an administrative subdivision of Iran
- Isfahan province, an administrative subdivision of Iran
- Esfahan Police Compound in Kohgiluyeh and Boyer-Ahmad Province, Iran
- Isfahan rug, a carpet traditionally manufactured in the city of Isfahan
- "Isfahan" (song), a Billy Strayhorn composition on Duke Ellington's The Far East Suite
- Isfahan (E.S. Posthumus song), a E.S. Posthumus song on the Unearthed album
- Ispahan (rose), a kind of rose, based on an older pronunciation of the city's name

== See also ==
- Al-Isfahani (disambiguation)
- Isfahani, a surname
  - Ispahani family
- Yspahan, a boardgame
