= Oğuzhan =

- Gender: Masculine
- Language: Turkish

Origin
- Language: Turkish
- Origin: "oğuz"
- Derivation: 1. "oğuz" 2. "han"
- Meaning: 1. "arrows", "clans", "nations" 2. "khan"

Other names
- Cognate: Oğuz
- See also: Oghuz Khan

Oğuzhan is a common masculine Turkish given name. "Oğuzhan" is composed of two words, "Oğuz" and "han"; Oğuz is a given name, while "han" means literally "khan". Thus, "Oğuzhan" means "Oğuz khan". The modern name derives from the name and title of Oghuz Khagan, a legendary Turkic leader.

There are various theories on the meaning of "Oğuz". The most prominent explanation is that it is composed of "ok" and "z". In modern Turkish as well as Proto-Turkic, "ok" means "arrow". However, in Proto-Turkic, "ok" also means "clan" or "nation". Again, only in Proto-Turkic, "-z" is the plural suffix. Therefore "okz" means "clans", "nations", or "arrows" in Proto-Turkic. In modern Turkish, "-z" is not the plural suffix anymore, having been replaced with "-lar" and "-ler".

"Oğuz" was used both as given names and as names of some of the Turkish clans. Oghuz Turks are the southwestern branch of Turkish clan system. "Gökoğuz" was a group of Oghuz Turks who migrated to northwest and were the ancestors of the modern Gagauz people. There are also groups named as Üçoğuz (Three Oğuz), Sekizoğuz (Eight Oğuz), Dokuzoğuz (Nine Oğuz), etc.

== People ==
- Oghuz Khagan, a legendary and semi-mythological Turkic leader
- Oğuzhan Asiltürk (1935–2021), Turkish politician
- Oğuz Han Aynaoğlu (born 1992), Danish-Turkish footballer
- Oğuzhan Azğar (born 1993), Turkish footballer
- Oğuzhan Bahadır (born 1979), Turkish football goalkeeper
- Oğuzhan Bıyık (born 1986), Turkish footballer
- Oğuzhan Kefkir (born 1991), Turkish-German footballer
- Oğuzhan Özyakup (born 1992), Turkish-Dutch footballer
- Oğuzhan Tüzün (born 1982), Turkish sport shooter
