= Jalal al-Din al-Qazwini =

14th-century Islamic scholar and rhetorician

Imam Jalāl al-Dīn al-Qazwīnī جلال الدين القزويني
- Title: Jalāl al-Dīn; Al-Khatib

Personal life
- Born: 1267 Mosul
- Died: 1338 (aged 70–71) Damascus
- Era: Mamluk period
- Region: Levant and Egypt
- Main interest(s): Islamic jurisprudence, Arabic rhetoric, Linguistics
- Notable work(s): Talkhis al-Miftah; Al-Īḍāḥ fī ʿUlūm al-Balāgha
- Occupation: Scholar, Muslim Jurist, Rhetorician, Linguist, Judge, Preacher

Religious life
- Religion: Islam
- Denomination: Sunni
- Jurisprudence: Shafi'i
- Creed: Ash'ari

Muslim leader
- Influenced by: Al-Shafi'i Abu Hasan al-Ash'ari Abd al-Qahir al-Jurjani Siraj al-Din al-Sakaki
- Influenced: Siraj al-Din al-Bulqini al-Safadi Abd Allah ibn Abd al-Rahman ibn Aqil Al-Taftazani Al-Sharif al-Jurjani

Jalāl al-Dīn Muḥammad ibn ʿAbd al-Raḥmān al-Qazwīnī (Arabic: جلال الدين محمد بن عبد الرحمن القزويني), commonly known as Jalāl al-Dīn al-Qazwīnī (Arabic: جلال الدين القزويني; 739–666 AH/ 1267–1338 CE) was a renowned Shāfiʿī jurist, linguist, judge, preacher, and scholar of Arabic rhetoric. He is most famous for refining and popularizing the science of balāgha (Arabic rhetoric), particularly through his two influential works: Talkhīṣ al-Miftāḥ and Al-Īḍāḥ fī ʿUlūm al-Balāgha. His writings became foundational in Islamic rhetorical education from the late medieval period onward, earning him recognition as one of the most influential scholars in the history of Arabic eloquence.

== Life ==
Jalal al-Din al-Qazwini was born in 666 AH (c. 1267 CE), most likely in Mosul, although his family originated from Qazwīn in Iran—hence his nisba "al-Qazwīnī". He lived during the post-Abbasid era, a time marked by the expansion of scholarly institutions in the Islamic world. He lived in the lands of Rūm with his father and brother, where he studied and trained in jurisprudence until he was appointed as judge (qāḍī) in Rūm while still under the age of twenty.

Then he travelled to Damascus and studied under a number of its scholars. He pursued knowledge in various sciences and mastered uṣūl al-fiqh, Arabic language, semantics (maʿānī), and eloquence (bayān). Al-Qazwīnī belonged to the Shāfiʿī school of law and held multiple public and scholarly. He taught at the Bādariyyah Madrasa and when his brother was appointed judge of Damascus, he deputized for him. He then deputized for Najm al-Dīn ibn Ṣaṣrā, until the Sultan al-Nāṣir summoned him and appointed him to the judiciary of Greater Syria (al-Shām) in the year 724 AH (1324 CE). He was also appointed as the preacher (khaṭīb) at the Umayyad Mosque.

He had arrived to meet Sultan al-Nāṣir on a Friday, and coincidentally, he met him within an hour of his arrival. The Sultan ordered him to deliver the Friday sermon in the Citadel Mosque, which he did. After finishing, he kissed the Sultan’s hand and apologized, saying he had just arrived from travel and did not expect the Sultan to command him to preach. The Sultan thanked him and asked how much debt he owed. He replied, "Thirty thousand (dirhams)," so the Sultan ordered that his debts be paid off. He remained in office as the chief judge of al-Shām until he was summoned in the year 727 AH (1327 CE) and appointed as Qāḍī al-Quḍāt (Judge of Judges) of Egypt when Badr al-Dīn ibn Jamāʿah fell ill. He remained there for a period before being dismissed and reinstated as Chief Judge in Greater Syria (Levant). The Sultan did not reject any of his intercessions (requests for favours). His prominent students include Siraj al-Din al-Bulqini, al-Safadi, and Abd Allah ibn Abd al-Rahman ibn Aqil. He died in Damascus in 739 AH (1338 CE).

== Legacy ==
Jalāl al-Dīn al-Qazwīnī is considered one of the most influential figures in the codification of Arabic rhetoric (ʿilm al-balāgha) during the post-classical period. Building upon the theoretical foundations laid by ʿAbd al-Qāhir al-Jurjānī (d. 471/1078) and the systematization initiated by al-Sakkākī (d. 626/1229), al-Qazwini played a central role in refining and organizing the field into a teachable, concise structure that shaped Islamic rhetorical education for centuries.

His two principal works — Talkhīṣ al-Miftāḥ and Al-Īḍāḥ fī ʿUlūm al-Balāgha — became standard texts in madrasas across the Islamic world. Talkhīṣ al-Miftāḥ is a succinct summary of the rhetorical sections of al-Sakkākī's Miftāḥ al-ʿUlūm, focusing on the three core branches of rhetoric: maʿānī (semantics and sentence structure), bayān (figurative clarity), and badīʿ (stylistic embellishment). Its clarity and brevity made it a foundational primer, while al-Īḍāḥ served as a more detailed companion, offering elaboration and examples for advanced students.

Al-Qazwini's works became the subject of extensive commentary by later scholars, most notably al-Taftāzānī (d. 792/1390), whose al-Mutawwal on the Talkhīṣ became a core text in its own right. Through these contributions, al-Qazwini helped transform balāgha into a formal science distinct from Arabic grammar and literary criticism. His legacy endures in both the curriculum of traditional Islamic education and the broader study of Arabic eloquence.

== See also ==
- List of Ash'aris
