= Balagha =

Classical Arabic rhetoric

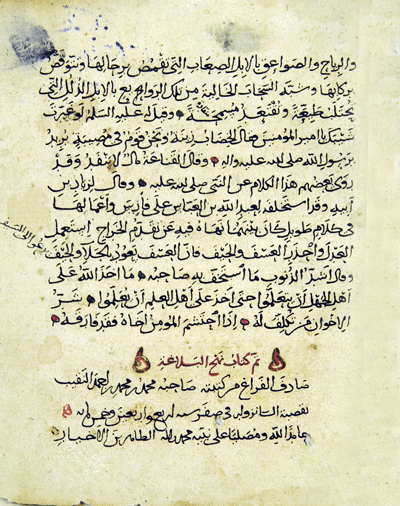
An image of Nahj Albalagha

Balāgha (Arabic: البلاغة) is the classical Arabic discipline of rhetoric. It is concerned with how language can be used to convey meaning, evoke emotional response, and persuade an audience. Rooted in Pre-Islamic Arabia and refined within Islamic scholarship, balāgha (ʿilm al-balāgha) developed into a formal science that integrates linguistic analysis with aesthetics and logic. The discipline drew on poetry criticism, Qurʾānic exegesis, secretarial prose, and theological discourse, and reached its classical formulation between the 5th and 7th Islamic centuries (11th–13th centuries CE).

== Etymology ==
The term balāgha derives from the Arabic root ب-ل-غ (b-l-gh), meaning "to reach" or "to convey successfully." In rhetorical usage, it refers to reaching the height of eloquence or conveying meaning effectively and appropriately to an audience.

== Historical development ==
=== Early eloquence and the Qur'anic challenge (Pre-Islamic to 1st Century AH) ===
Balāgha began as an informal literary practice rather than a formalized discipline. In pre-Islamic Arabia, eloquence (faṣāḥa) played a central role in poetic contests, such as those held at the marketplace of ʿUkāẓ. Poets like al-Nābigha al-Dhubyānī (d. 604 CE) are recorded as judges in these events, illustrating an early rhetorical culture.

With the revelation of the Qurʾān, Arab poets were reported to have attempted to match its linguistic style, though sources suggest that their efforts did not reproduce its characteristics. Scholars subsequently formulated the doctrine of iʿjāz al-Qurʾān (Qurʾanic inimitability) to explain the distinctive features of the Qurʾān's language and style.

Nahj al-Balāgha is a 10th-century compilation by the Shia scholar al-Sharīf al-Rāḍī (d. 1015), containing sermons, letters, and sayings attributed to Ali ibn Abi Talib. The work has been studied for its rhetorical style and has influenced discussions of Arabic literature and balāghah.

=== Secretaries and philologists (2nd–3rd Centuries AH) ===
With the institutionalization of the Islamic state, professional secretaries (kuttāb) emerged who required eloquence for diplomatic and administrative writing. Works like Ibn Qutaybah's Adab al-Kātib and al-Ḥamadhānī's Al-Alfāẓ al-Kitābiyya provided guidance on literary style and composition for these purposes.

In parallel, philologists such as Abu al-ʽAbbās Thaʽlab (al-Faṣīḥ) and Ibn al-Sikkīt (Iṣlāḥ al-Mantiq) cataloged proper usage and stylistic norms, motivated in part by the linguistic Arabization of non-Arab Muslim populations.

=== Rise of poetic criticism and Badiʿ (3rd–4th Centuries AH) ===
During the Abbasid period, the study of poetic embellishment (badīʿ) became prominent, generating discussion among scholars regarding literary innovation. Ibn al-Muʿtazz (d. 909) wrote Kitāb al-Badīʿ, arguing that rhetorical figures were rooted in pre-Islamic poetry and the Qurʾān rather than representing new innovations (Bid'ah). In the work, he cataloged five rhetorical devices, including istiʿārah and tajnīs, and emphasized balance in usage over excessive ornamentation.

Simultaneously, Abū ʿUthmān al-Jāḥiẓ (d. 869), a pioneering Mu'tazilite writer, composed al-Bayān wa al-Tabyīn, an early treatise on expressive language, eloquence, and speech psychology.

=== Systematization and classical codification (5th–7th Centuries AH) ===
Abd al-Qāhir al-Jurjānī (d. 1078) is widely considered the founder of classical balāgha. He established a comprehensive theory of rhetorical effectiveness centered on the concept of naẓm, which concerns the intricate relationship between syntactic structures and semantic meaning. His two major works, Dalāʾil al-Iʿjāz (Proofs of Inimitability), which focuses on semantic structures, and Asrār al-Balāgha (Secrets of Eloquence), which explores imagery and figurative speech, laid the theoretical groundwork for the field.

The application of these rhetorical principles to Qur'anic exegesis was advanced by Al-Zamakhsharī (d. 1144), a Mu'tazilite scholar. His commentary, al-Kashshāf, was the first to place rhetorical analysis at the heart of interpreting the Qur'anic text. He also authored Asās al-Balāgha, a thesaurus and dictionary dedicated to figurative expressions. While his theological views were controversial, his linguistic and rhetorical insights have been consistently acknowledged for their significant contribution to the study of the Quran's unique eloquence.

The formal codification of balāgha into its now-standard tripartite structure was achieved by Al-Sakkākī (d. 1229) in his encyclopedic work, Miftāḥ al-ʿUlūm (The Key to the Sciences). He organized the science into the three core disciplines of ʿilm al-maʿānī (the study of semantic structures), ʿilm al-bayān (the study of figurative speech), and ʿilm al-badīʿ (the study of rhetorical embellishments). This comprehensive framework proved highly influential for subsequent generations of scholars.

Finally, Jalāl al-Din al-Qazwīnī (d. 1338) played a crucial role in consolidating and disseminating this knowledge. He produced an abridgement of al-Sakkākī's work entitled Talkhīṣ al-Miftāḥ (The Summary of the Key), which he later explained in his own commentary, al-ʾĪḍāḥ fī ʿUlūm al-Balāgha (The Clarification of the Sciences of Rhetoric). These two texts became central in madrasah curricula, especially in the post-classical period. Al-Qazwīnī is thus credited with creating the structured and accessible framework that served as the standard reference for the study and teaching of balāgha throughout the post-classical period and beyond.

=== Consolidation and preservation ===
After the era of refinement and popularization under al-Qazwīnī, the science of balāgha entered a stage often described as one of consolidation and preservation rather than fresh theorization. Major scholars devoted themselves to systematizing, teaching, and commenting upon the established corpus of rhetorical theory. During this period, a number of scholars emerged who excelled at presenting this legacy in a clear and systematic way. Among them were:

- Saʿd al-Dīn al-Taftāzānī (d. 1390) authored influential commentaries, most notably his Al-Muṭawwal and Mukhtaṣar al-Ma'ni, which became standard teaching texts in madrasas. These works distilled the material of al-Qazwīnī while clarifying and expanding on difficult points.
- Al-Sharīf al-Jurjānī (d. 1413) further developed this tradition with his super-commentaries (ḥawāshī), offering deeper critical engagement with al-Taftāzānī's interpretations and helping cement the scholastic framework of balāgha.
- Jalāl al-Dīn al-Suyūṭī (d. 1505) compiled, versified, and preserved earlier doctrines in works such as ʿUqūd al-Jumān fī ʿIlm al-Maʿānī wa-l-Bayān, making the discipline accessible to students through didactic poetry.

Through these efforts, the classical tradition of balagha was effectively codified, ensuring its transmission as a central component of advanced Islamic education.

=== Modern revival ===
Ali al-Jarim, an Azhar-trained scholar and later Dean of Cairo University, together with the Egyptian educator Mustafa Amin, authored al-Balagha al-Wadiha, a textbook designed to simplify the study of balagha. By omitting complex debates rooted in philosophy and logic and carefully selecting the most essential topics, they made the subject more accessible. The work achieved wide success, was reprinted many times, and remains a standard textbook in high schools across the Middle East as well as in introductory courses for non-Arab students in seminaries.

Mohamed Abu Musa is considered as one of the most prominent scholars of Arabic rhetoric in the modern era, and a figure in the contemporary revival movement of classical Arabic rhetoric. Abu Musa dedicated his life to reestablishing the connection between modern Arabic education and the rhetorical traditions established by such exceptional scholars as Abd al-Qahir Al-Jurjani. His writings stem from a vision posting that rhetoric is an essential lens through which the linguistic miraculousness of the holy Quran can be perceived with true accuracy and depth. Abu Musa directed particular criticism toward the manner in which Arabic grammar and rhetoric have come to be taught in modern educational institutions, for these disciplines have been reduced to mere abstract technical systems, rather than being presented as living frameworks for meaning and perception. He believed that this pedagogical failure had left an entire generation incapable of engaging in an authentic and an important manner with classical Arabic texts. He stated:

“What is more important is that this generation, whose condition requires from us greater effort, and whose mistake is evident, is asking of us that it learn grammar and rhetoric in the language of past ages. Yet we have realized that we are on the verge of losing it, and that the direction behind it lies in overlooking the perceptible shades and failing to observe what Islam has manifested within it.”(Abu Musa, 1996, p. 19)

==== Contemporary application and Qur'anic rhetorical exegesis ====
Modern scholars have revitalized balāgha by applying it to Qur'anic exegesis and literary analysis:

- Ibn ʿĀshūr's tafsir entitled al-Taḥrīr wa al-Tanwīr is a landmark Qur'anic commentary focused on rhetorical structure.
- Hamīd al-Dīn Farāhī and Amīn Aḥsan Iṣlāḥī developed theories of Qur'anic coherence (naẓm), continued in English by Raymond Farrin and others.

== Subfields ==
Balagha is traditionally divided into three core disciplines. Each branch addresses a distinct aspect of rhetorical structure and effectiveness, working together to ensure a message is conveyed with precision, clarity, and persuasive power. These three foundational pillars are 'Ilm al-Ma'ani (the Science of Meanings), which concerns sentence construction and contextual appropriateness; 'Ilm al-Bayan (the Science of Expression), which deals with figurative language and clarity of meaning; and 'Ilm al-Badi' (the Science of Embellishment), which focuses on artistic devices that enhance the rhetorical impact. The following sections provide a concise overview of each subfield:

=== ʿIlm al-Maʿānī (Science of Meanings) ===
This branch focuses on understanding the meaning and purpose behind sentences, as well as the correct application of grammatical structures. It guides how to craft sentences that fit a particular context and audience. For instance, addressing children would require simpler vocabulary and shorter sentences compared to delivering a scholarly lecture. Essentially, this science emphasizes clarity, precision, and the effective use of language according to the situation.

To express this in a different way, ‘ilm al-ma‘ānī is a core sub-field of Arabic rhetoric that studies the direct relationship between grammar and meaning. It evaluates how an author arranges words and selects specific sentence structures to appropriately match the setting and audience. This branch of study is rooted in al-Jurjānī's theory that true eloquence relies on deliberately using the rules of syntax to accurately reflect the complex ideas in a speaker's mind.

=== ʿIlm al-Bayān (Science of Expression) ===
This branch, one of the most recognized in Balagha, explores the different ways to express a single meaning using various rhetorical techniques. It examines key figures of speech, including:

- Tashbīh (التشبيه): Simile, which compares two things using words like “as” or “like.”
- Majāz (المجاز): Metaphor or figurative language, where words or phrases convey a meaning beyond their literal sense.
- Kināyah (الكناية): Metonymy, using a related term or phrase to represent an idea, such as “the people of the sword” to refer to soldiers.

=== ʿIlm al-Badīʿ (Science of Embellishment) ===
This branch emphasizes the artistic and decorative aspects of language, focusing on techniques that enhance elegance and rhythm in speech and writing. Examples include:

- Jinās (الجناس): Paronomasia or puns, where words sound alike but differ in meaning.
- Saj‘ (السجع): Rhymed prose, which gives a musical quality to the text.
- Tibāq (الطباق): The use of contrasting terms to create striking effects, such as “darkness and light.”

== Western analysis ==
The literary eloquence of the Qur'an is examined within the Arabic linguistic discipline known as al-Balāgha. This field encompasses the study of the Qur’an’s i‘jāz (inimitability) among other aspects. Notably, there exists a distinction between ‘ilm al-Balāgha (the science of Arabic eloquence) and classical Greek rhetoric. William Smyth observes, in the Western tradition, rhetoric was primarily studied to craft speeches, with its main applications situated in the forum and law courts. In contrast, within the Islamic context, the study of language was principally aimed at understanding the foundational proofs of Islamic law. The primary goal of Arabic linguistic study, therefore, was to extract meaning from established texts rather than to compose new ones.

Arabic scholarship further divides ‘ilm al-Balāgha into three core branches: ‘ilm al-Ma‘ānī (the study of syntax and semantics), ‘ilm al-Bayān (the study of figurative language), and ‘ilm al-Badī‘ (the study of stylistic and poetic devices). Zeibiri (2003: 100) notes that the term “rhetoric” has often carried pejorative connotations in the Western tradition, sometimes implying empty verbosity or manipulative discourse, which is seen as inimical to truth. Boullata (1988, cited in Zeibiri 2003: 104) argues that the Arabic term al-Balāgha, often translated as “rhetoric,” is more accurately rendered as “the study of aesthetic effectiveness” or “the art of conveying meaning in the best verbal form.” Consequently, the study of Balāgha has occasionally acquired the negative associations historically linked with rhetoric in the Graeco-Roman tradition.

== Major works ==
The foundational and canonical works that shaped the science of Arabic rhetoric (Balagha) include:

- Dalāʾil al-Iʿjāz and Asrār al-Balāgha by Abd al-Qahir al-Jurjani.
- Al-Kashshāf and Asās al-Balāgha by al-Zamakhshari.
- Miftāḥ al-ʿUlūm by Siraj al-Din al-Sakkaki.
- Talkhīṣ al-Miftāḥ and Al-ʾĪḍāḥ fī ʿUlūm al-Balāgha by Jalal al-Din al-Qazwini.
- Al-Mutawwal and Mukhtaṣar al-Ma'ni by al-Taftazani.
- ʿUqūd al-Jumān by al-Suyuti.
- Al-Taḥrīr wa al-Tanwīr by Ibn ʿĀshūr.
- Kitāb al-Badīʿ by Ibn al-Muʿtazz.
- Al-Bayān wa al-Tabyīn by al-Jahiz.
- Nahj al-Balāgha by al-Sharif al-Radi.

== See also ==
- Arabic grammar
- Arabic literature
- Tafsir
- Iʿjāz al-Qurʾān
- Pragmatics

== Sources ==
- Suheil Laher (2017). The History of Balagha. Fawakih Institute. pp. 2–16 – via Academia.edu.
- J. T. P. de Bruijn (15 December 1988). "BALĀḠAT". Encyclopædia Iranica.
- Hussein Abdul-Raof (27 September 2006). Arabic Rhetoric - A Pragmatic Analysis. Taylor & Francis. pp. 3–225. doi:10.4324/9780203965399. ISBN 9780203965399.
- Salima Rustamiy, Durdona Lutfullaeva, Hilola Gulomova (2020). "The Importance of Balagha Science in Aesthetic Education". PalArch's Journal of Archaeology of Egypt / Egyptology. 17 (6). PalArch Foundation: 8882–8886. ISSN 1567-214X.
- Carol Poster, Richard Utz (1999). Discourses of Power - Grammar and Rhetoric in the Middle Ages. Northwestern University Press. pp. 1–151. ISBN 978-0-8101-1812-6.
- Martijn Theodoor Houtsma (1987). "Balāgha". E.J. Brill's First Encyclopaedia of Islam 1913-1936. Vol. 1. Brill. pp. 611–612. ISBN 978-90-04-08265-6.
- Jonathan Owens (15 August 2013). The Oxford Handbook of Arabic Linguistics. Oxford University Press. pp. 185–207. ISBN 9780199344093.
- Vladimir Braginsky (11 October 2013). The Comparative Study of Traditional Asian Literatures - From Reflective Traditionalism to Neo-Traditionalism. Taylor & Francis. pp. 165–166. ISBN 9781136833694.
