= Kamal al-Din Isfahani =

Iranian author & poet (1172–1237)

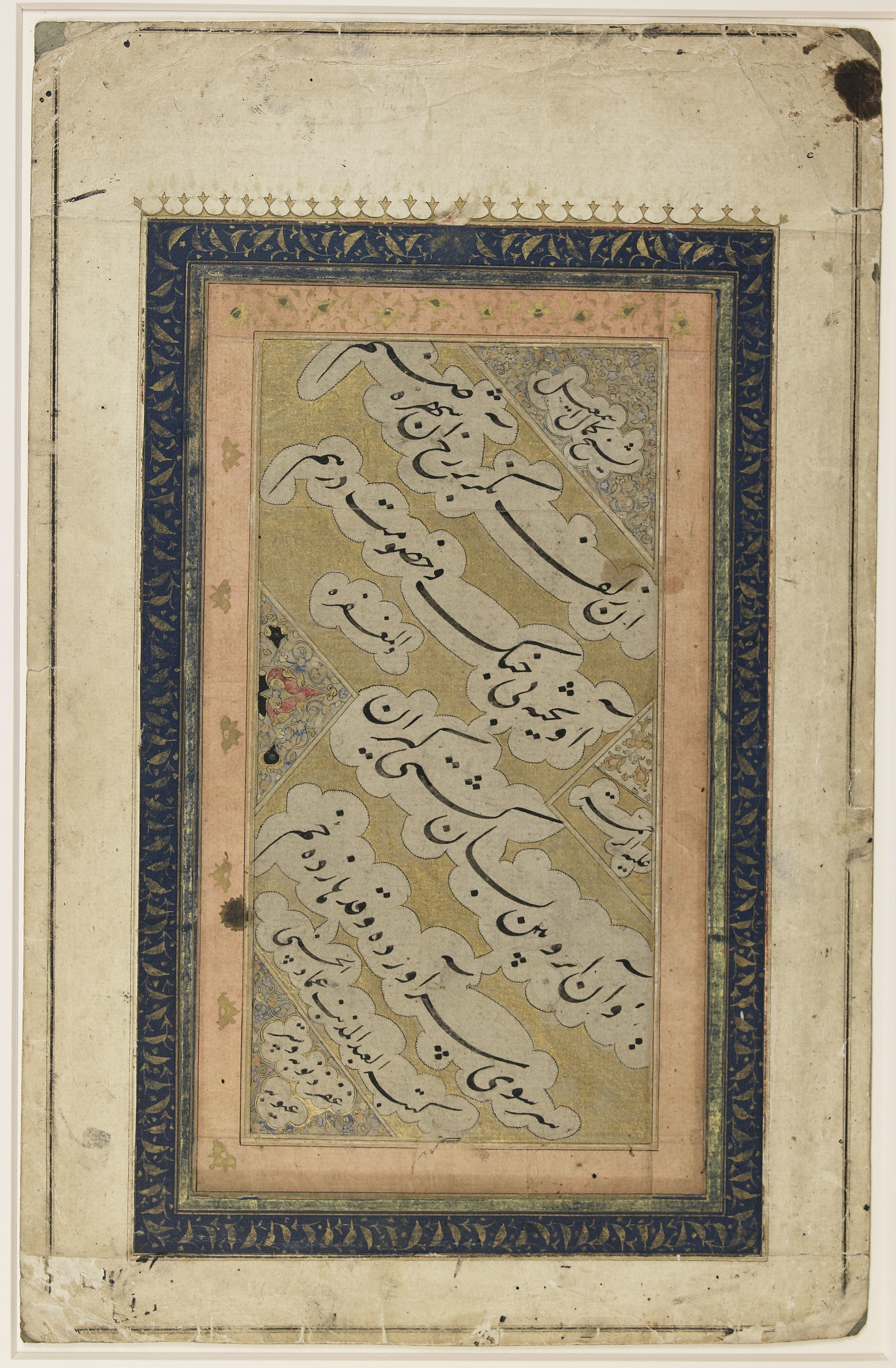
- Quatrain (rubaʿi) of Kamal al-Din Isfahani copied by Mir Emad Hassani. Iran, early 17th-century. Library of Congress
- Native name: کمال الدین اسماعیل
- Born: 1172 Isfahan, Seljuk Empire
- Died: 21 December 1237 (aged 64–65) Isfahan, Mongol Empire
- Notable works: Divan of Kamal al-Din Isfahani
- Relatives: Jamal al-Din Muhammad Isfahani (father)

Kamal al-Din Isfahani (Persian: کمال الدین اسماعیل; 1172 – 1237) was a Persian writer of qasidas and other forms of poetry, who lived from 1172–1237. He and his father, the poet Jamal al-Din Muhammad Isfahani, were well-known in Isfahan. He was murdered during the Mongol invasion and buried in a simple tomb. His tomb is in the Jouybareh district in Isfahan.

== Sources ==
- Durand-Guédy, David (2010). "Kamāl-al-Din Eṣfahāni". In Yarshater, Ehsan (ed.). Encyclopædia Iranica. Vol. XV/4: Kafir Kala–Ḵamsa of Jamāli. London and New York: Routledge & Kegan Paul. pp. 415–417. ISBN 978-1-934283-26-4.
- Durand-Guédy, David (2018). "Kamāl al-Dīn Iṣfahānī". In Fleet, Kate; Krämer, Gudrun; Matringe, Denis; Nawas, John; Rowson, Everett (eds.). Encyclopaedia of Islam (3rd ed.). Brill Online. ISSN 1873-9830.
