= Asas al-Balagha =

12th-century thesaurus and dictionary

The Foundation of Eloquence
- Editor: Muhammad Basil Uyun al-Sud
- Author: Al-Zamakhshari
- Original title: أساس البلاغة
- Language: Arabic
- Subject: Balagha
- Genre: Dictionary
- Publisher: Dar al-Kotob al-'Ilmiyya
- Publication date: 2010
- Pages: 1392
- ISBN: 978-2-7451-2197-4

Asās al-Balāghah ("The Foundation of Eloquence") is a thesaurus and dictionary of figurative speech (Ilm al-Bayan), a branch in Arabic rhetoric authored by Al-Zamakhshari. Zamakhshari authored the work, in part, to reconcile what he viewed as the miraculous nature of the Qur'an with his theological views.

Notable as the earliest fully alphabetical Arabic lexicography, and in addition for the metaphorical content Zamakhshari includes with his literal definitions. Zamakhshari's system lists words in alphabetical order according to the first component of their tri-radical consonant letters to the last. He excludes complicated derived and rare forms, such quadrilaterals and quintilaterals. Zamakhshari's goal was to catalog both the literal and figurative meanings of Arabic words, and he used examples from the Qur'an and hadith for both. He viewed words almost as living organisms that were given life by the way they were used in rhetoric.
