= Oğuz (name) =

- Gender: Masculine
- Language: Turkic_languages

Origin
- Language: Turkic languages
- Origin: "ok"
- Derivation: 1. "ok" 2. "z"
- Meaning: 1. "arrow", "clan", "nation" 2. plural suffix

Other names
- Cognate: Oğuzhan
- See also: Oghuz Khan

Oğuz is a common masculine Turkic given name. There are various theories on the meaning of "Oğuz". The most prominent explanation is that it is composed of "ok" and "z". In various modern Turkic languages and in Proto-Turkic language "ok(h)" means "arrow". Only in Proto-Turkic language, "ok" also means "clan", and/or "nation". Again, only in Proto-Turkic language, "z" is the plural suffix. In modern Turkish "z" is not the plural suffix anymore, in general. Therefore "okz" means "clans", "nations", and/or "arrows".

Finally, "Oğuz" is used both as given names and as names of some of the Turkic clans. Oğuz Türks are the southwestern branch of Turkish clan system. "Gökoğuz" was a group of Oğuz Türks who migrated to northwest and named as Gagauz in modern times. There are also groups named as Üçoğuz (Three Oğuz), Sekizoğuz (Eight Oğuz), Dokuzoğuz (Nine Oğuz), etc. One of the earliest rulers of the Turkic people is also named "Oghuz Khan". As a given name "Oğuz" used in memory of and connotes Oghuz Khan.

== Given name ==
=== First name ===
- Oğuz Akbulut (born 1992), Turkish para-athlete
- Oğuz Han Aynaoğlu, Turkish-Danish football player
- Oğuz Atay (1934–1977), Turkish novelist
- Oğuz Dağlaroğlu (born 1979), Turkish football player
- Oğuz Gökmen (1916–2007), Turkish writer and diplomat
- Oghuz Khan, legendary khan of Turks, considered to be the ancestor of all Turks
- Oğuz Savaş (born 1987), Turkish basketball player
- Oğuz Tansel (1915–1994), Turkish poet and folklorist
- Oğuz Tezmen, Turkish politician
- Oğuz Yılmaz (musician) (1968–2021), Turkish folk musician

=== Middle name ===
- Hıfzı Oğuz Bekata (1911–1995), Turkish lawyer and politician
- Muhammet Oǧuz Zengin, Turkish curler

== Surname ==
- Candeğer Kılınçer Oğuz (born 1980), Turkish female high jumper
- Abdullah Oğuz (born 1958), Turkish director
- Ahmet Oğuz (born 1993), Turkish football player
- Cemal Oğuz, Turkish judoka
- Cemal Oğuz, Turkish biologist and academic
