= Isfahani =

Isfahani (Persian: اصفهانی) or Ispahani is a surname of Iranian origin. It may refer to the following:

- Al-Isfahani
- Al-Raghib al-Isfahani
- Imad ad-Din al-Isfahani
- Jalal al-Din Muhammad al-Isfahani

== See also ==
- Al-Isfahani (disambiguation)
- Esfahani
- Isfahan
- Isfahani style
