= Esfahani =

Esfahani (Persian: اصفهانی) is an Iranian surname. Notable people with the surname include:

- Abdas-Samad Esfahani, Iranian Sufi
- Abu al-Hasan al-Esfahani, Iranian grand ayatollah
- Asir-e Esfahani, Persian poet
- Ata'ollah Ashrafi Esfahani, Iranian ayatollah
- Bondari Esfahani, Persian historian and translator
- Jaleh Esfahani (1921–2007), Iranian poet
- Mahan Esfahani, Iranian-American keyboardist
- Mohammad Esfahani, Iranian pop music singer
- Soheila Esfahani, Iranian-born Canadian visual artist

== See also ==
- Al-Isfahani (disambiguation)
- Isfahani
- Isfahan
