= Sayyid Suhrāb Walī =

Sayyid Suhrāb Walī (Persian: سید سهراب ولی) was a legendary pīr (Sūfī master) associated with the central Asian region of Badakhshān. Little is known for certain of his life, or even if he really existed, but his importance as a legendary figure, prominent in mostly nineteenth-century central Asian Ismaili hagiography, is not doubted.

== Account of Silk-i guhar-rīz ==
The earliest and most important hagiography of Sayyid Suhrāb is the Silk-i guhar-rīz, composed by Khwājah Aḥrār, who claimed descent from Sayyid Suhrāb, around 1251 AH/1835 CE in Jurm, a town in what is now the Afghan province of Badakhshān. This hagiography portrays Sayyid Suhrāb as a descendant of Muḥammad and of Mūsā al-Kāẓim. It claims that Sayyid Suhrāb’s father was one Mīr Sayyid Ḥasan. Mīr learns of the renowned Nāṣir-i Khusraw and engages a prominent dervish, Bābā Ḥaydar, to escort the four-year-old Sayyid Suhrāb, then four years old, to Nāṣir. Sayyid Suhrāb studies alongside Umar Yumgī, but it is Sayyid Suhrāb whom Nāṣir then makes his principle disciple and successor (in a move more likely reflecting the spiritual politics of the Ismaili community that produced the text than any historical reality), and the charismatic Sayyid Suhrāb goes on to have a large following of his own. Many central Asian Ismaili families continue to claim Sayyid Suhrāb as an ancestor and a source of their own spiritual authority. Another prominent hagiography of Sayyid Suhrāb is entitled Baḥr al-akhbār.

== Historicity ==
In the assessment of Daniel Beben, 'the extent of Sayyid Suhrāb’s presence within the genealogical traditions of the Badakhshān region suggests that his name bears at least some connection to a historical figure'. He argues that notwithstanding the traditional association with Nāṣir-i Khusraw (implying a twelfth-century date for Sayyid Suhrāb), the genealogies actually imply a date of birth around 1400 CE. Since the Ismaili text Ṣaḥīfat al-nāẓirīn is in the majority of known manuscripts attributed to Sayyid Suhrāb but in another recension attributed to the fifteenth-century Ghiyāth al-Dīn ʿAlī Iṣfahānī, Beben has even suggested that Sayyid Suhrāb might in origin have been Ghiyāth al-Dīn himself.
