= Oghuz Khagan =

Legendary khan of the Turkic people, eponymous ancestor of Oghuz Turks

Oğuz Khan
- Oghuz Khan enthroned, folio 9r (Bibliothèque nationale, Supplément persan 1113)
- Born: in Central Asia
- Known for: being an eponymous ancestor of Oğuz Turks
- Title: Khan
- Predecessor: Qara Khan
- Successor: Split into the 24 Oğuz Tribes
- Spouse: Selvihan Hatun
- Children: Gun, Ay, Yildiz, Kok, Tagh, Tengiz
- Parents: Qara Khan (father); Ay Khagan (mother)

Oghuz Khagan or Oğuz Khan (Turkish: Oğuz Kağan or Oğuz Han; Azerbaijani: Oğuz Xan or Oğuz Xaqan; Turkmen: Oguz Han) is a legendary khan of the Turkic people and an eponymous ancestor of the Oghuz Turks. Some Turkic cultures use the legend of Oghuz Khan to describe their ethnic and tribal origins. The various versions of the narrative preserved in many different manuscripts have been published in numerous languages, as listed in the references below. The narratives about him are often entitled Oghuzname, of which there are several traditions describing his many feats and conquests; some of these tend to overlap with other Turkic epic traditions, such as the Seljukname and The Book of Dede Korkut. Oğuz Khan was from the Balga tribe, the son of Qara Bey (Oğuz Bey), and later became a khan.

The name of Oghuz Khan has been associated with Modu Chanyu, a Xiongnu leader often by Turanists. The reason for this is the assumed similarities between the biography of Oghuz Khagan in Turkic mythology and the biography of Modu found in Chinese historiography, a theory first proposed by the Russo‑Chuvash sinologist Hyacinth.

== Legend ==
According to a Turkic legend, Oghuz was born in Central Asia as the son of Qara Khan, leader of the Turkic people. He started talking as soon as he was born. He stopped drinking his mother's milk after the first time and asked for kymyz (an alcoholic beverage made from fermented mare's milk) and meat. After that, he grew up supernaturally fast, and in only forty days he became a young adult. At the time of his birth, the lands of the Turkic people were preyed upon by a dragon named Kiyant. Oghuz armed himself and went to kill the dragon. He set a trap for the dragon by hanging a freshly killed deer in a tree; then he killed the great dragon with a bronze lance and cut off its head with a steel sword.

After Oghuz killed Kiyant, he became a people's hero. He formed a special warrior band from the forty sons of forty Turkic begs (lords or chiefs), thus gathering the clans together. However, his Chinese stepmother and half‑brother, who was the heir to the throne, became intimidated by his power and convinced Qara Khan that Oghuz was planning to dethrone him. Qara Khan decided to assassinate Oghuz at a hunting party. Oghuz learned of this plan and instead killed his father, becoming the khan. His stepmother and half‑brother fled to Chinese lands.

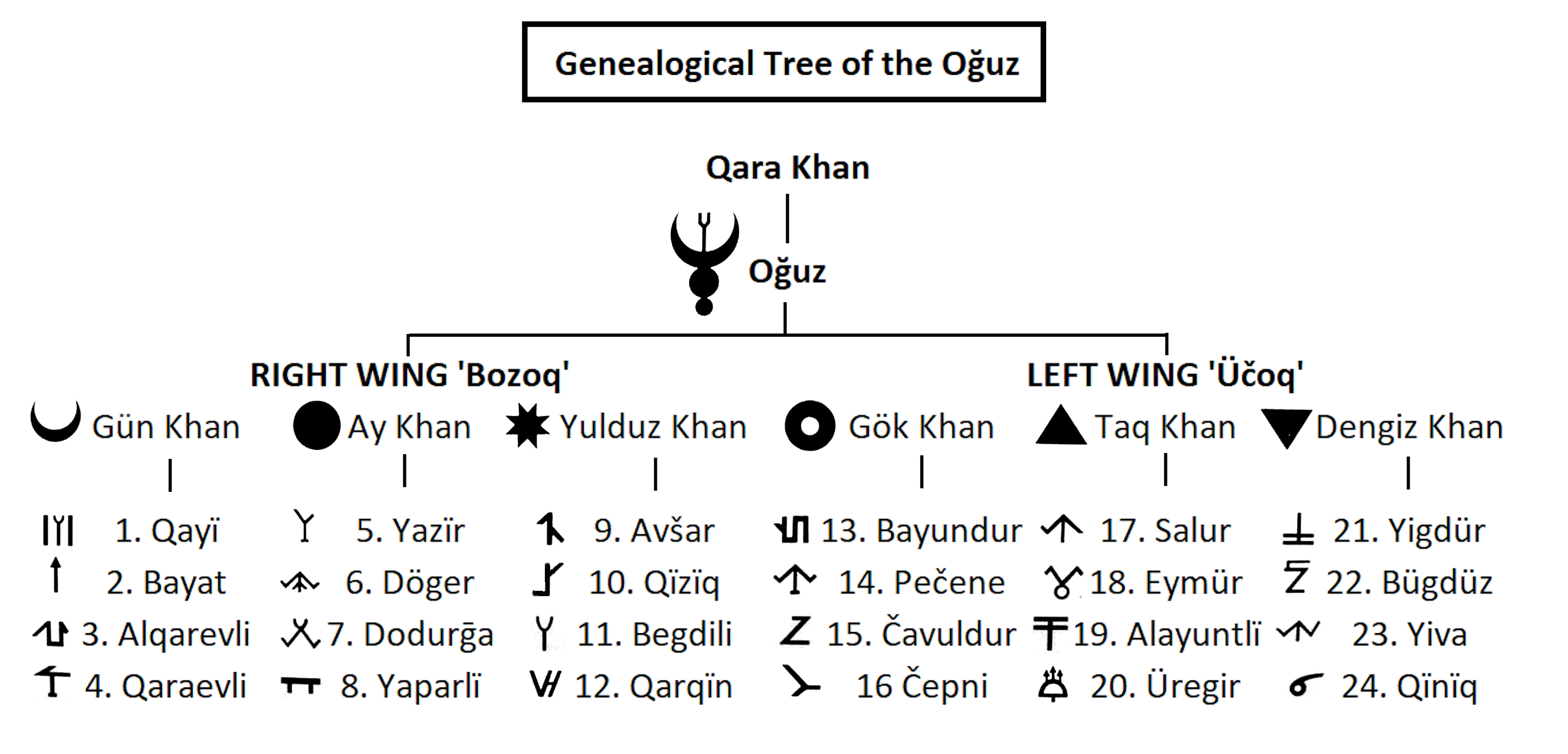
Genealogical tree of Oghuz.

After Oghuz became the khan, he went to the steppes by himself to praise and pray to Tengri. While praying, he saw a circle of light coming from the sky with a supernaturally beautiful girl standing in the light. Oghuz fell in love with the girl and married her. He had three sons whom he named Gün (Sun), Ay (Moon), and Yıldız (Star) (all in Turkmen). Later, Oghuz went hunting and saw another mesmerizing girl inside a tree. He married her as well and had three more sons whom he named Gök (Sky), Dağ (Mountain), and Deniz (Sea) (in Turkmen).

After his sons were born, Oghuz Khan gave a great toy (feast) and invited all of his begs (lords). At the feast, he gave this order to his lords:

I have become your Khan;
Let's all take swords and shields;
Kut (divine power) will be our sign;
Gray wolf will be our uran (battle cry);
Our iron lances will be a forest;
Khulan will walk on the hunting ground;
More seas and more rivers;
Sun is our flag and sky is our tent.

Then, he sent letters to the Kings of the Four Directions, saying: "I am the Khan of the Turks. And I will be Khan of the Four Corners of the Earth. I want your obedience."

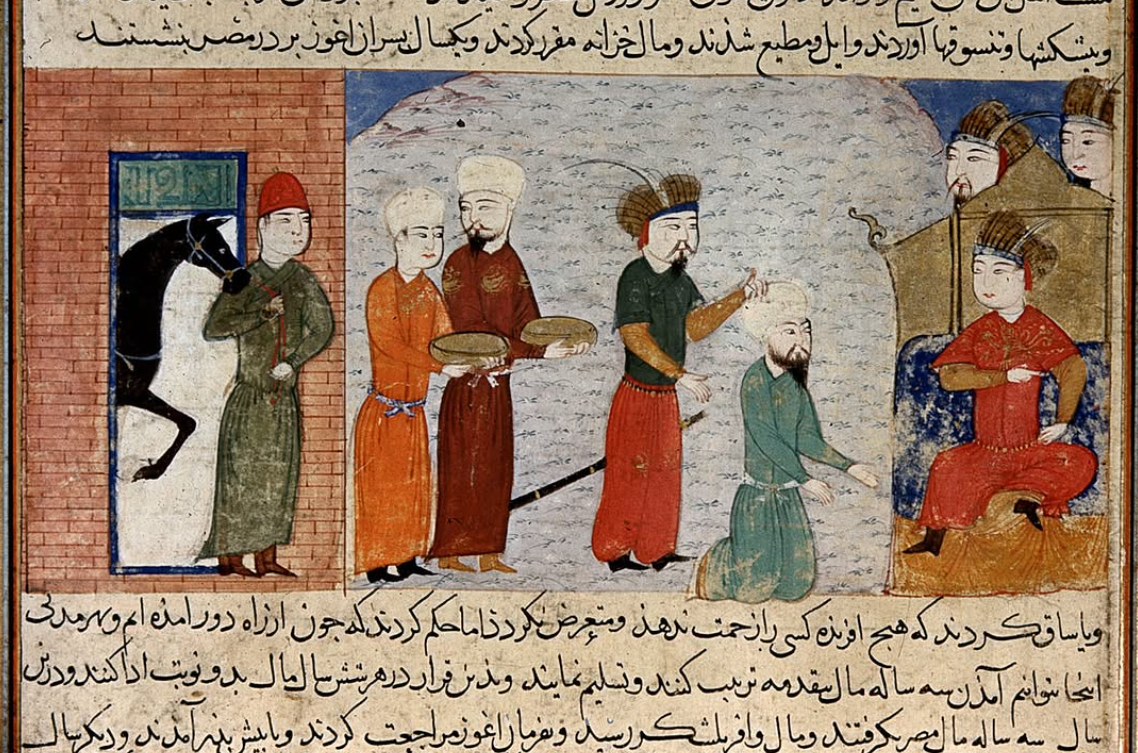
Sons of Oguz collecting taxes in Egypt per Oguz's order. Jami al-Tawarikh (1317-1425) H.1654

Altun Khan (Golden Khan), on the right corner of the earth, submitted his obedience, but Urum (Roman), Khan of the left corner, did not. Oghuz declared war on Urum Khan and marched his army to the west. One night, a large male wolf with grey fur (which is an avatar of Tengri) came to his tent in an aura of light. He said, "Oghuz, you want to march against Urum, I want to march before your army." So, the grey sky-wolf marched before the Turkic army and guided them. The two armies fought near the river İtil (Volga). Oghuz Khan won the battle. Then, Oghuz and his six sons carried out campaigns in Turkistan, India, Iran, Egypt, Iraq and Syria, with the grey wolf as their guide. He became the Khan of the Four Corners of the Earth.

In his old age, Oghuz saw a dream. He called his six sons and sent them to the east and the west. His elder sons found a golden bow in the east. His younger sons found three silver arrows in the west. Oghuz Khan broke the golden bow into three pieces and gave each to his three older sons Gün, Ay, and Yıldız. He said, "My older sons, take this bow and shoot your arrows to the sky like this bow." He gave the three silver arrows to his three younger sons Gök, Dağ and Deniz and said, "My younger sons, take these silver arrows. A bow shoots arrows and you are to be like the arrow." Then, he passed his lands on to his sons, Bozoks (Gray Arrows - elder sons) and Üçoks (Three Arrows - younger sons) at a final banquet. (Abū’l-Ghāzī identifies the lineage symbols, tamga seals and ongon spirit guiding birds, as well as specifying the political hierarchy and seating order at banquets for these sons and their 24 sons). Then he said:

My sons, I walked a lot;
I saw many battles;
I threw so many arrows and lances;
I rode many horses;
I made my enemies cry;
I made my friends smile;
I paid my debt to Tengri;
Now I am giving my land to you.

== Descendants ==
=== Seljuks ===
The Seljuks originated from the Kinik branch of the Oghuz Turks, who in the 9th century lived on the periphery of the Muslim world, north of the Caspian Sea and Aral Sea in their Yabghu Khaganate of the Oghuz confederacy. During the 11th century, they established the Great Seljuk Empire under the command of the Seljuk chieftains Toghrul Beg and Chaghri Beg.

=== Anushteginids ===
There are certain historical sources that state that the Anushteginids, who ruled vast parts of Central Asia from 1077 to 1231 under the title of Khwarazmshahs, descended from the Begdili tribe of the Oghuz Turks.

The dynasty was founded by commander Anush Tigin Gharchai, a former Turkic slave of the Seljuq sultans, who was appointed as governor of Khwarezm. His son, Qutb ad-Din Muhammad I, became the first hereditary Shah of Khwarezm.

=== Qara Qoyunlu ===
Qara Qoyunlu was a tribal confederation of Oguz Turkic nomadic tribes from the Oguz tribe of Yiva, which existed in the 14th–15th centuries in Western Asia, on the territory of modern Azerbaijan, Armenia, Iraq, northwestern Iran and eastern Turkey.

=== Aq Qoyunlu ===
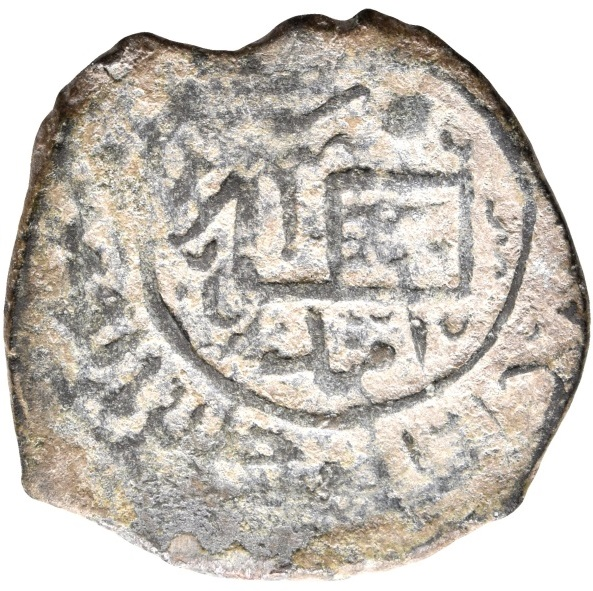
Anonymous Aq Qoyunlu fals having the Bayindir tribe symbol

The Aq Qoyunlu sultans claimed descent from Bayindir Khan, through a grandson of Oghuz Khagan.

Professor G. L. Lewis stated:

The Ak-koyunlu Sultans claimed descent from Bayindir Khan and it is likely, on the face of it, that the Book of Dede Korkut was composed under their patronage. The snag about this is that in the Ak-koyunlu genealogy Bayindir's father is named as Gok ('Sky') Khan, son of the eponymous Oghuz Khan, whereas in our book he is named as Kam Ghan, a name otherwise unknown. In default of any better explanation, I therefore incline to the belief that the book was composed before Ak-koyunlu rulers had decided who their ancestors where. It was in 1403 that they ceased to be tribal chiefs and became Sultans, so we may assume that their official genealogy was formulated round about that date.

=== Ottomans ===
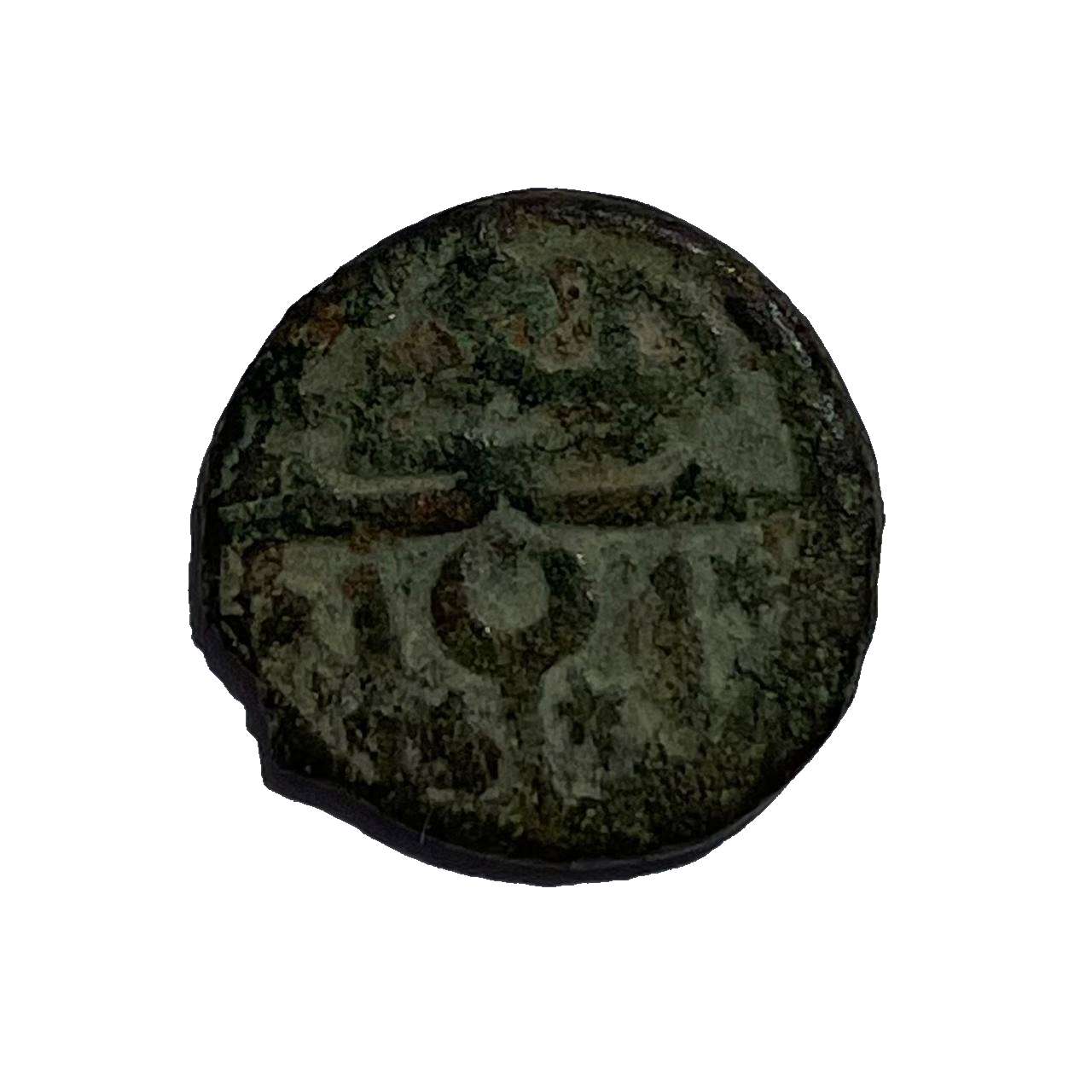
Manghir coin of Murad II having the Kayi tribe symbol

Ottoman historian and ambassador to the Qara Qoyunlu, Şükrullah states that Ertuğrul's lineage goes to Gökalp, a son of Oghuz Khagan. The author states that the information was shown during a court of Jahan Shah, from a book written in Mongolian script.

Yazıcıoğlu Ali, in the early 15th century, traced Osman's genealogy to Oghuz Khagan, through his senior grandson of his senior son, so giving the Ottoman sultans primacy among Turkish monarchs. Yazıcıoğlu quotes as follows:

Ertugrul, from the tribe of Kayï, his son Osman Bey, and the beys on the frontier, held an assembly. When they had consulted each other and understood the custom of Oghuz (Khan), they appointed Osman khan.

Bayezid I advanced this claim against Timur, who denigrated the Ottoman lineage.

According to Ottoman historian Neşri, Osman had a grandfather with a king's name and came from a lineage of the senior branch of Oghuz family:

The experts in the knowledge of the foundation of the prophets and those who know the secrets of the meanings (human) works narrate that this great lineage (of the house of Osman) comes from Oghuz son of Kara Han, who was one of the children of Bulcas, son of Yofas, son of Noah, peace be upon him! As follows: Ertugrul son of Suleyman Shah son of Kaya Alp son of Kızıl Buğa ... son of Bulcas son of Yafes son of Noah.

Cem Sultan, Bayezid II's brother, linked their genealogy to Oghuz Khagan which would prevail as a tool of legitimization from the sixteenth century onwards:

Oghuz Khan, he has given the name, which means "saint", in his childhood because he was seen on the right path (i.e. God's). Because he recognized the Oneness of God, he fought with his father, and Oghuz's army killed the latter. This happened during Prophet Abraham's times.

== Historical precursor and legacy ==
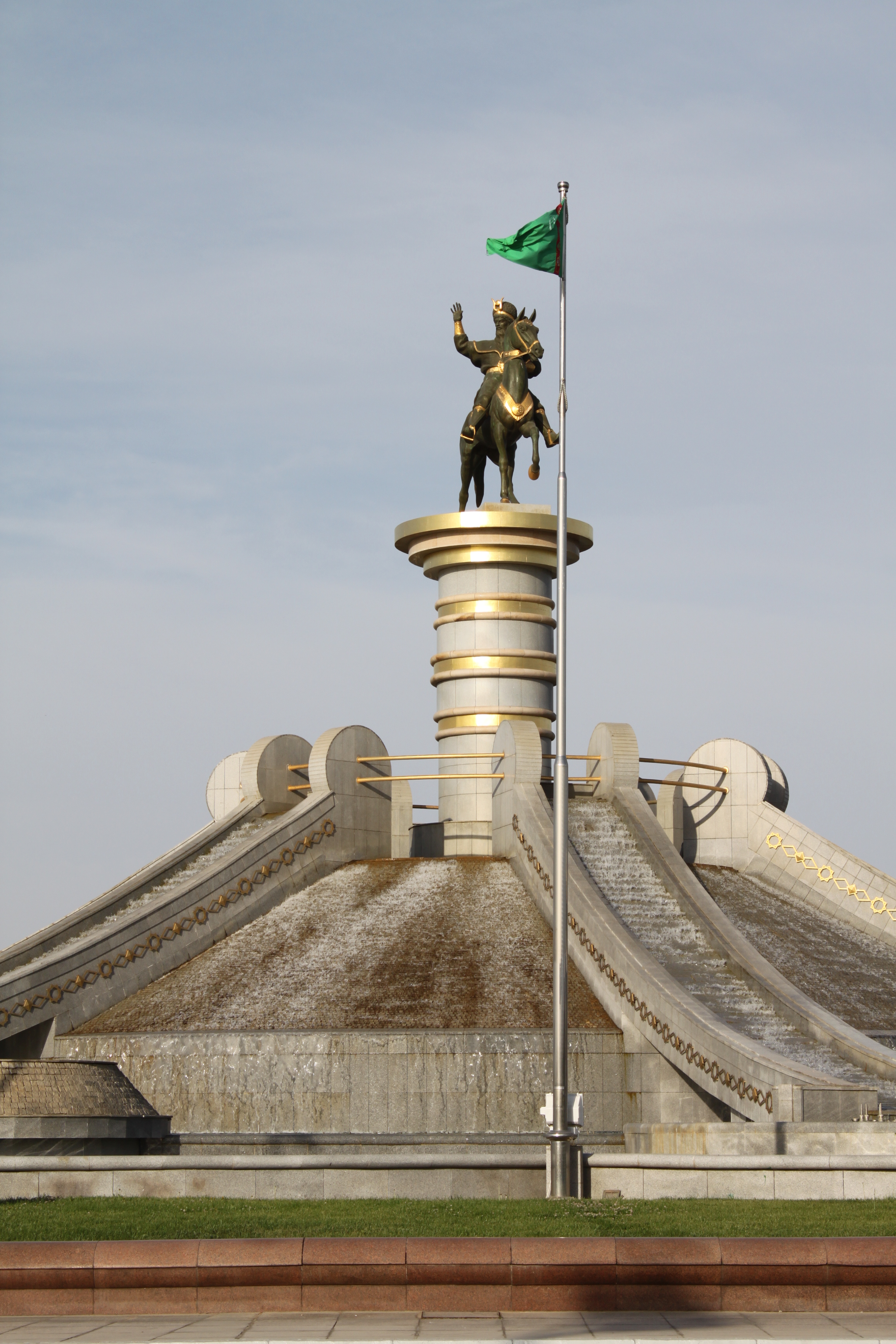
Modern Oguzhan monument in Ashgabat

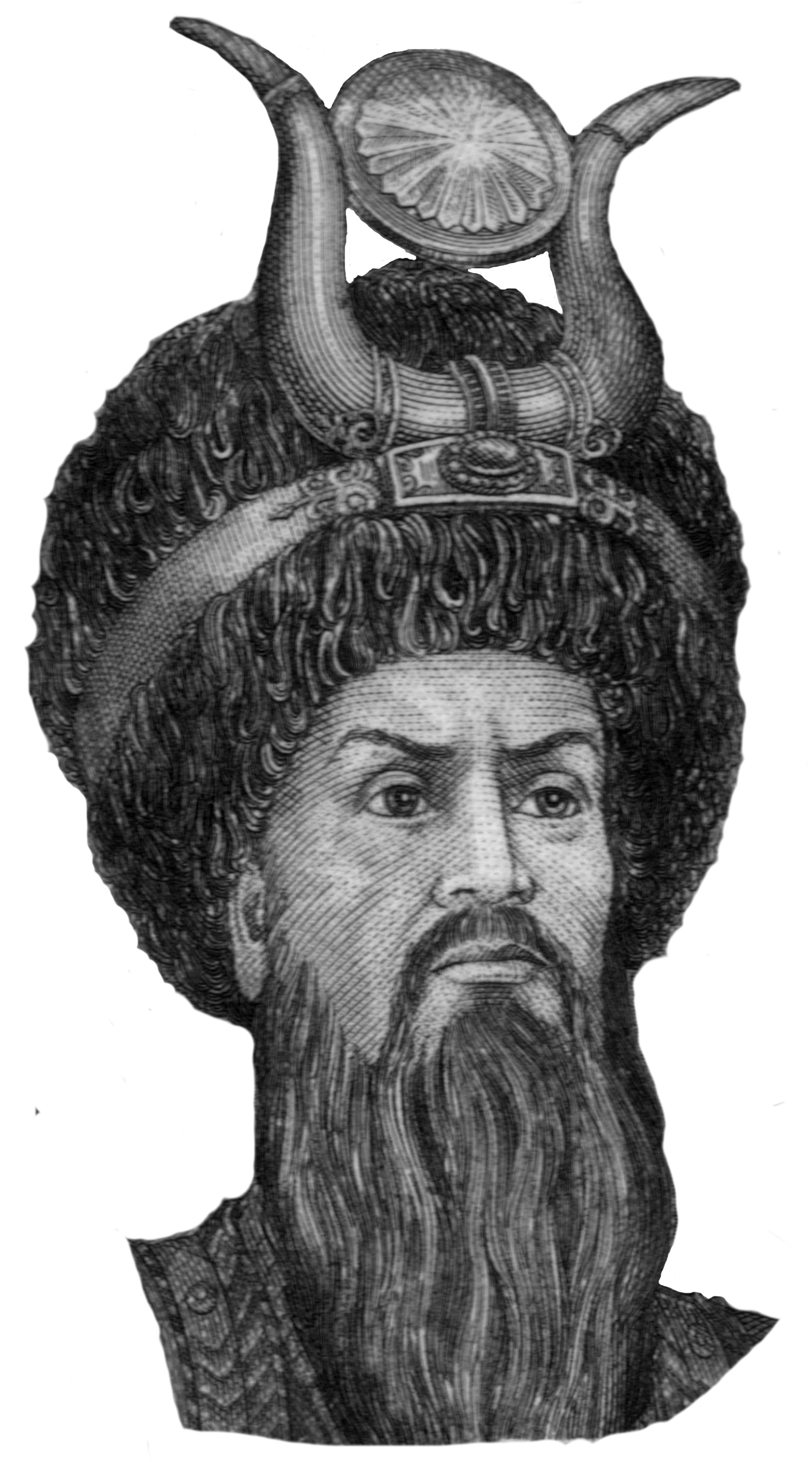
Modern-day representation of Oghuz Khan as Dhu al-Qarnayn, with two horns

According to Abulgazi, Oghuz Khan may have lived four thousand years before the Prophet Muhammad, during the time of the legendary ancient king Keyumars. The 18th‑century French academic J.‑S. Bailly placed the khan's life in the 29th century BC, while the 18th‑century Russian geographer and historian P. Rychkov and the Soviet historian O. Tumanovich placed it in the 7th century BC. The French Encyclopaedia of Diderot and d'Alembert mentions that Oghuz Khan lived long before the Persian king Cyrus II.

The Swedish geographer and cartographer Philip Johan von Strahlenberg (17th–18th centuries), drawing on the Ancient Greek historian Diodorus Siculus and other sources, concluded that Oghuz Khan was the leader of the ancient Scythian peoples, under whose leadership they conquered vast territories in the Middle East, Southeast Europe, and Egypt in ancient times. Stralenberg also noted that among the Central Asian peoples, Oghuz Khan enjoyed the same fame as Alexander the Great and Julius Caesar among Europeans.

In the scholarly literature, the name of Maodun is usually associated with Oghuz Khagan. The reason for this is a striking similarity between the biography of Oghuz Khagan in Turkic‑Persian manuscripts (Rashid al‑Din, Hondemir, Abulgazi) and the biography of Maodun in Chinese sources (feud between father and son, murder of the former, direction and sequence of conquests, and so on), a similarity first noticed by N.Ya. Bichurin (Collection of information, pp. 56–57).

Preliminary studies suggest that Oghuz Khan may have lived during the 6th to 7th centuries CE, possibly as a member or leader of the Tiele tribal group known as Kibir (Qibi). Presumably, he was an ally and supporter of a Yabgu‑Khagan of the Western Turkic Khaganate up to a certain point. Moreover, it has been proposed that Oghuz Khan may have been a close relative and companion of the Qibi chief Geleng (哥楞), also known as Yiwuzhenmohe Qaghan. The possibility of a kinship link between Oghuz Khan and the ruling Ashina clan has also been examined.

Oghuz Khan is sometimes considered the legendary founder of most Turkic peoples and the ancestor of the Oghuz sub‑branch. Even today, the sub‑branches of the Oghuz are classified according to the order of the legendary six sons and twenty‑four grandsons of Oghuz Khan. In history, Turkmen dynasties often rebelled or claimed sovereignty by asserting that their rank was higher than that of the existing dynasty in this tribal classification.

Oghuz Khan appears on the 100 manat banknote.

Oğuz and Oğuzhan are common masculine Turkish and Turkic given names, derived from Oghuz Khan.

Mary Province's district, Oguzhan, in Turkmenistan is named after him.

The international airport in Ashgabat, Turkmenistan, is named after Oghuz Khan.

== See also ==
- Book of Dede Korkut
- Ergenekon

== Bibliography ==
- Abū’l Ghāzī. 1958. Rodoslovnaia Turkmen. Andrei N. Kononov, ed. Moscow: Nauka.
- İlker Evrim Binbaş, Encyclopædia Iranica, "Oguz Khan Narratives" Welcome to Encyclopaedia Iranica, accessed 7 July 2012.
- Golden, Peter B. 1992. An introduction to the history of the Turkic peoples. Ethnogenesis and state formation in medieval and early modern Eurasia and the Middle East. Wiesbaden: Harrassowitz.
- Light, Nathan. Genealogy, history, nation
- Nationalities Papers: The Journal of Nationalism and Ethnicity. Volume 39, Issue 1, 2011, Pages 33 – 53.
- Pelliot, Paul. 1930. Sur la légende d'Uγuz-khan en écriture ouigoure. T'oung Pao. Second Series. 27: 4–5. pp. 247–358.
- Rašīd ad-Dīn. Die Geschichte der Oġuzen des Rašīd ad-Dīn. Karl Jahn, trans. Vienna: 1969
- Shcherbak, Aleksandr Mikhaǐlovich. Oguz-name. Muhabbatname. Moscow, 1959.
- Woods, John E. 1976. The Aqquyunlu Clan, Confederation, Empire: a study in 15th/16th Century Turco-Iranian Politics. Minneapolis: Bibliotheca Islamica.
