= Jalal ad-Din =

Jalal ad-Din (Arabic: جلال الدین, lit. 'Majesty of the Faith') is a male Muslim given name of Arabic origin, formed from the name Jalal with the suffix ad-Din. It may also be written as Jalal al-Din, Jalaluddin, Jalaleddin, Dželaludin and Djelaludin.

Notable people with the title or name include:

== People ==
- Jalaluddin Hasan (1187–1221), 25th Nizāri Ismā‘ilī Imām
- Jalaluddin Surkh-Posh Bukhari (c. 1192–1291), Suhrawardiyya Sufi saint
- Jalal al-Din Mangburni (died 1231), last ruler of the Khwarezmid Empire (r. 1220–1231)
- Jalaluddin Muhammad Rumi (1207–1273), Persian poet and Sufi mystic
- Jalaluddin Tabrizi (died 1288), Sufi saint of Bengal
- Jalal ud din Firuz Khalji (died 1296), first Indian ruler of the Delhi sultanate and founder of the Khalji dynasty
- Jalal al-Din al-Qazwini (1267–1338), Shafi'i jurist and scholar of Arabic rhetoric
- Jalaluddin Jahaniyan Jahangasht (c. 1308–1385), Suhrawardiyyah Sufi Saint
- Jalal al-Din Mahmud (died 1352), Mihrabanid king of Sistan
- Jalal ad-Din khan (1380–1412), khan of Golden Horde, son of Tokhtamysh, leader of Lipka Tatars
- Jalal ad-Din al-Mahalli (c. 1389–1460), Egyptian religious scholar
- Jalaluddin Muhammad Shah (died 1433), ruler of Bengal
- Jalaluddin Fateh Shah (died 1487), ruler of Bengal
- Jalaladdin Davani (1426–1502), Persian philosopher, theologian, jurist and poet
- Imam Jalaluddin Al-Suyuti (c. 1445–1505), Egyptian religious scholar, juristic expert and teacher
- Jalaluddin Muhammad Akbar (1542–1605), Mugal Emperor of India
- Jalal Al-Din Mirza (1827–1872), Persian historian and freethinker
- Jalal al-Din Muhammad al-Isfahani, (fl. 1828), Persian physician
- Jalaluddin Mirza (1864–1876), prince of the Mughal royal family
- Djelal ed-Din Korkmasov (1877–1937), Dagestani revolutionary and Soviet politician
- Jalaluddin Ahmad (1890–1958), Bengali landlord, jurist and politician
- Muhammad Jalaluddin Sayeed (born 1920), founding director of Neptune Orient Lines
- Jalal Al-Din Taheri (1926–2013), Iranian Islamic theologian
- Jalaleddin Farsi (born 1934), Iranian politician
- Jalaluddin Umri (1935–2022), Indian Muslim writer
- Jalal Mansur Nuriddin (Jalaluddin Mansur Nuriddin, born 1944), American musician and hip hop pioneer
- Mir Jalaleddin Kazzazi (born 1949), Iranian writer
- Jalaluddin Haqqani (born c. 1950), Afghan military leader
- Jalaluddin Hassan (born 1954), Malaysian actor
- Jalal al-Din Ali al-Saghir (born 1957), Iraqi politician
- Jalal-ud-Din (cricketer) (born 1959), Pakistani cricketer
- Dželaludin Muharemović (born 1970), Bosnian footballer
- Djelaludin Sharityar (born 1983), Afghan-German footballer
- Jalaledin Alimohammadi (born 1990), Iranian footballer
- Jasurbek Jaloliddinov (born 2002), Uzbek footballer

== Other ==
- Jalaleddin (novella), Armenian historical novel by Raffi
- Jalaluddin School, school in the Maldives.
