= Abu al-Fath al-Isfahani =

Iranian 10th-century mathematician

Philosophical work
- Region: Persian scholar
- School: Persian science

Abu al-Fath Mahmud ibn Muhammad ibn Qasim ibn Fadl al-Isfahani, Persian: ابوالفتح محمود بن محمد بن قاسم اصفهانی Latinized Abalphatus Asphahanensis, was a 10th-century Persian mathematician. He flourished probably around 982 AD in Isfahan.

He gave a better Arabic edition of the Conics of Apollonius and commented on the first books. The Conics had been translated a century before by Hilal al-Himsi (books 1–4) and Thabit ibn Qurra (books 5–7).

== See also ==
- List of Iranian scientists

== Sources ==
- H. Suter: Die Mathematiker und Astronomen der Araber (98, 1900).
