= Oğuz Tansel =

Turkish poet (1915–1994)

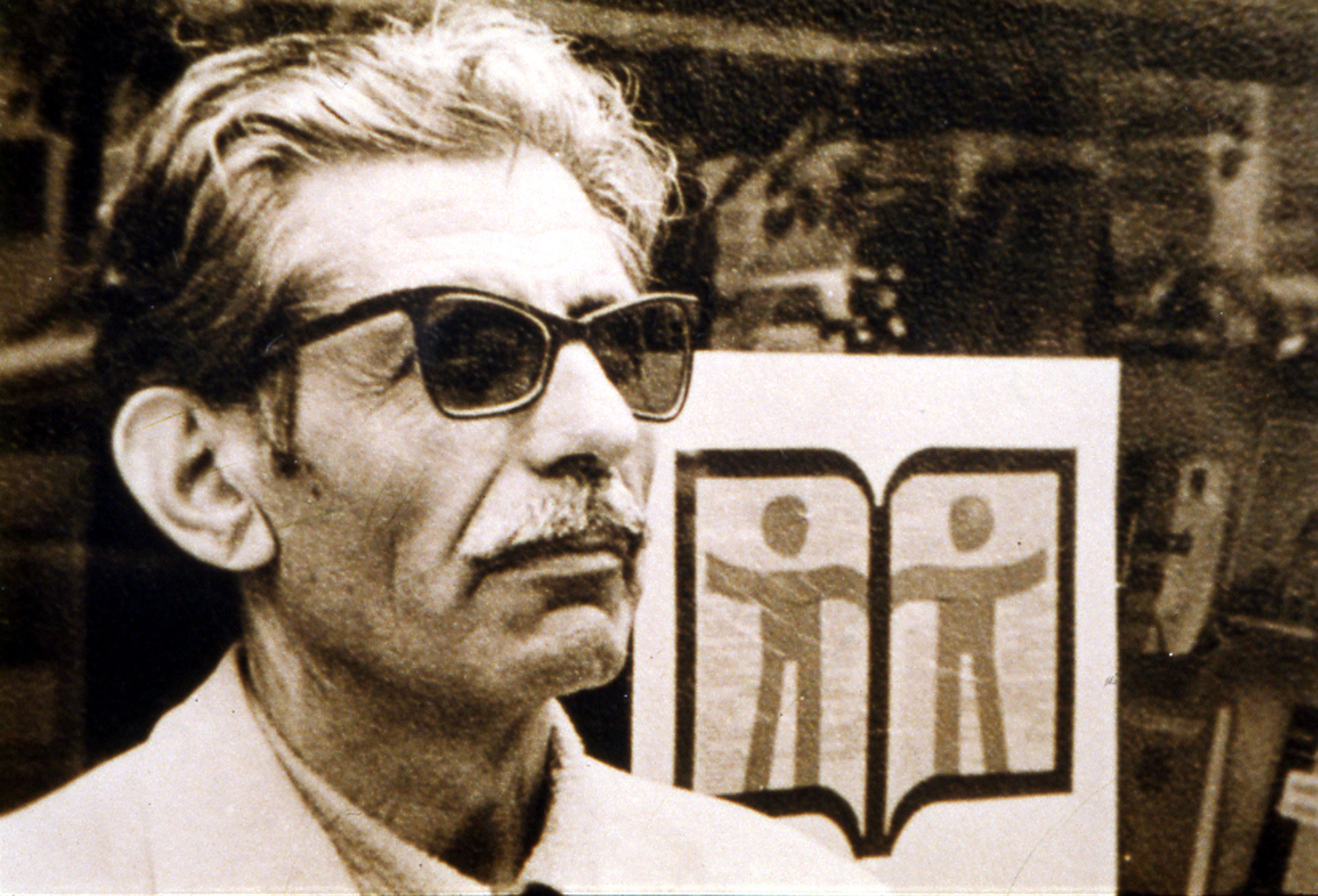
Oguz Tansel foto Elips

Oğuz Tansel (February 15, 1915 in Meyre, Konya – October 30, 1994 in Ankara) was a Turkish poet and folklorist.

== Early life and career ==
Tansel graduated from Davutpaşa junior high school and Pertevniyal high school in Istanbul. He took up teaching as a profession as early as 1938 while studying at the Department of the Turkish Language and Literature of the Faculty of Literature at the Istanbul University and gave it up in 1969 when he retired for health reasons. He taught and held administrative positions in the junior high schools and high schools in Mardin, Akhisar, Eskişehir (Çifteler Village Institute), Amasya and Konya. He was a member of the Turkish Writers’ Union and honorary member of the Literary Society.

== Writing career ==
His early poems employing rhyme and rhythm were published in the periodicals Servetifünun and Varlık and his first article appeared in Halk Bilgisi Haberleri (1937). After 1940 he was seen to turn to free verse and was noted among Turkish poets of the 1940s generation. He gained recognition with the poems and articles published in numerous literary periodicals such as Varlık, Aydınlık, Yelken, Yeditepe, Kaynak, Dost, Güney, Türk Sanatı, Kıyı, Türk Dili. In his poems where he treated themes of humanism, love, struggle for peace and freedom, equality and socialism he arrived at a plain style of poetry.

Alongside poetry, Tansel was the scholar of Turkish folk tales which he had recorded during 1942-1948 in the province of Amasya. He made the highest contribution of over forty types of Turkish folk tales, to the Typen Türkischer Volksmarchen catalog prepared by professors Pertev Naili Boratav and Wolfram Eberhard. With the mastery and meticulousness derived from his poetic skill, he formed his own unique, fluent narrative style in writing down those tales for children. He was the first author to receive the Children’s Literature Award in 1977 given by the Turkish Linguistics Society for his two volume collection of folk tale books titled “Al’lı ile Fırfırı”.

His poems were composed to music by the American composer Prof. Bruce Reiprich. And recorded live on a CD titled Salkım Söğüt, or The Weeping Willow. On the first anniversary of his death in 1995, his friends had a book The Mythical Bird with Three Wings: Oğuz Tansel (Üç Kanatlı Masal Kuşu: Oğuz Tansel) published for him.

== Death and after ==
Oğuz Tansel Turkish Literature center is established with an Oğuz Tansel Research Library at Bilkent University.

His family together with Ankara Aydınlığı Girişimi instituted a poetry award to commemorate him. His family together with Ankara Aydınlığı Girişimi, Folklor/ Edebiyat Dergisi and Troya Folklor Dernegi also instituted a folklore award to commemorate his achievements. These awards are given one year to a work of poetry and the following year to a work of folklore and the following year to a work of children's Literature.

== Works ==
=== Poetry ===
Tansel, Oğuz (1953) Savrulmayı Bekleyen Harman, İstanbul: Yeni Matbaa.

Tansel, Oğuz (1962) Gözünü Sevdiğim, Ankara: Dost Yayınları.

Tansel, Oğuz (1986) Sarıkız Yolu, Ankara: Yaz Yayınları.

Tansel, Oğuz (M. Eloğlu ile) (1970) Bektaşi Dedikleri (desenler: Abidin Dino) İstanbul: İş Bankası Kültür Yayınları, 1977: İstanbul: Sander Yayınları, 1983: İstanbul: Miyatro Yayınları, 1995: İstanbul: Adam Yayınları, 2004 ve 2008: İstanbul: Evrensel Basım Yayın.

Tansel, Oğuz (1999, 2006, 2013) Dağı Öpmeler (ölümünden sonra yayına hazırlayan: A. Tansel) İstanbul: Yapı Kredi Yayınları.

Tansel, Oğuz (2005, 2013) Mutluluk Peşinde (Seçme Şiirler), İstanbul: Evrensel Basım Yayın.

Tansel, Oğuz (2011) Zakkum Çiçeği Tan Yerinde-At the Dawn of Oleander Blossoms (İngilizce-Türkçe Antalya Dolayları Şiirleri), Antalya: Suna-İnan Kıraç Akdeniz Medeniyetleri Araştırma Enstitüsü.

Tansel, Oğuz (2012) Masal Dünyası-World of Tales (İngilizce-Türkçe Seçme Şiirler / English- Turkish Selected Poems), Ankara: Elips Kitap.

Tansel, Oğuz (2017) Gökdeniz-Das Meer am Himmel (Almanca-Türkçe Seçme Şiirler / Ausgewahlte Gedichte auf Deutch und Türkisch), Wassenberg, Almanya: Schulbuchverlag Anadolu.

Tansel, Oğuz (with M. Eloğlu) (2020) Dervish Bektashi Gems (Illustrations: Abidin Dino) (Bektaşi Dedikleri kitabı İngilizce) Istanbul: Libra Kitap.

=== Folk Tales ===
Tansel, Oğuz (1959) Altı Kardeşler, Ankara: Dost yayınları, (2003) Ankara: MEB Yayınları.(2011) İstanbul: Yapı Kredi Yayınları.

Tansel, Oğuz (1962) Yedi Devler, İstanbul: Kutulmuş Matbaası Yayınevi (2003) Ankara: MEB Yayınları, (2011) İstanbul: Yapı Kredi Yayınları.

Tansel, Oğuz (1963) Üç Kızlar, Ankara: Dernek Yayınları, (2003) Ankara: MEB Yayınları,(2011) İstanbul: Yapı Kredi Yayınları.

Tansel, Oğuz (1966) Mavi Gelin, Ankara: Yaz Yayınları, (2003) Ankara: MEB Yayınları,(2011) İstanbul: Yapı Kredi Yayınları.

Tansel, Oğuz (1976) Al’lı ile Fırfırı, 2 Cilt, (1977 Türk Dil Kurumu ödülü aldı), İstanbul: Yaz yayınları, (2009, 2012, 2014, 2016) Ankara: Elips Kitap.

Tansel, Oğuz, A. Özyalçıner ve diğerleri (1979) Bir de Varmış İki de Varmış, İstanbul: Boyut Yayın, (2006) İstanbul: Boyut Yayın.

Tansel, Oğuz (1985) Çobanla Bey Kızı, Ankara: Yaz Yayınları.

Tansel, Oğuz (1985) Konuşan Balıkla Yalnız Kız, Ankara: Yaz Yayınları.

Tansel, Oğuz (2018) Al’lı ile Fırfırı (Rusça’ya Çeviren: Anastasia M. Zherdeva) Kırım: Tarpan Yayınevi.

Tansel, Oğuz (2019) Masallar, İstanbul: Yapı Kredi Yayınları.

Tansel, Oğuz (2019) Altı Kardeşler, (Rusça’ya Çeviren: Anastasia M. Zherdeva) Kırım: Tarpan Yayınevi.

Tansel, Oğuz (2019) Yedi Devler (Rusça’ya Çeviren: Anastasia M. Zherdeva) Kırım: Tarpan Yayınevi.

=== Books About Him ===
Turan, Metin (Hazırlayan) (1996) Üç Kanatlı Masal Kuşu: Oğuz Tansel, Ankara: Ürün Yayınları. Genişletilmiş İkinci Basım (2018), Genişletilmiş Üçüncü Basım (2019) ve Genişletilmiş Dördüncü Basım (2021), Ankara: Ürün Yayınları.

Eloğlu, Metin (2012) Canım Oğuzcuğum: Oğuz Tansel’e Mektuplar, İstanbul: Yapı Kredi Yayınları.

Atlı, Ferda (2020) Şiirin Mavi Dili, Ankara: Sonçağ Akademi Yayınları..

== Awards ==
Oğuz Tansel was the first to receive the Children’s Literature Award given by the Turkish Linguistics Society in 1977.
