= Jamal al-Din Muhammad Isfahani =

Iranian poet and painter

Jamal al-Din Muhammad Isfahani (Persian: جمال الدین محمد اصفهانی) was a Persian poet and painter from Isfahan, who was active in the second half of the 12th-century.

Modern scholarship acknowledges his ghazals being of high quality, as well as a forerunner of the ghazals of Saadi Shirazi (died 1291/92).

Regardless, opinions about Jamal al-Din are varying. Saeed Nafisi regarded him as "the greatest Iranian poet of the 12th century" and "the most eloquent poet of Iran after Unsuri." Wahid Dastgerdi considers Jamal al-Din to have been the only one that could challenge the poet Sanai (died 1131/41). The opinions of Badiozzaman Forouzanfar and Jan Rypka, however, are less positive.

Jamal al-Din possibly had four children, two of them whom are known; Kamal al-Din Mahmud, who died before him, and Kamal al-Din Isfahani (died 1237) who surpassed him as a poet.

== Sources ==
- Durand-Guédy, David (2008). "Jamāl-al-Din Moḥammad Eṣfahāni". In Yarshater, Ehsan (ed.). Encyclopædia Iranica. Vol. XIV/4: Jade III–Jamalzadeh, Mohammad-Ali II. Work. London and New York: Routledge & Kegan Paul. pp. 436–438. ISBN 978-1-934283-04-2.
- Durand-Guédy, David (2018). "Kamāl al-Dīn Iṣfahānī". In Fleet, Kate; Krämer, Gudrun; Matringe, Denis; Nawas, John; Rowson, Everett (eds.). Encyclopaedia of Islam (3rd ed.). Brill Online. ISSN 1873-9830.
