= Siraj al-Din al-Sakkaki =

13th-century Islamic scholar and rhetorician

Imam Sirāj al-Dīn al-Sakkākī سراج الدين السكاكي
- Title: Sirāj al-Dīn

Personal life
- Born: 11 May 1160 Khwarazm
- Died: 1229 (aged 68–69) Qaryat al-Kindi
- Era: Islamic golden age
- Region: Khwarazm
- Main interest(s): Fiqh, Theology, Arabic rhetoric, Arabic grammar, Linguistics, Prosody, Poetry
- Notable work: Miftāḥ al-ʿUlūm
- Occupation: Scholar, Jurist, Theologian, Rhetorician, Grammarian, Linguist, litterateur, Poet

Religious life
- Religion: Islam
- Denomination: Mu'tazila
- Jurisprudence: Hanafi

Muslim leader
- Influenced by: Wasil ibn Ata Abu Hanifa Abd al-Qahir al-Jurjani Al-Zamakhshari Fakhr al-Din al-Razi
- Influenced: Jalal al-Din al-Qazwini

Sirāj al-Dīn Abū Yaʿqūb Yūsuf al-Sakkākī al-Khwārizmī (Arabic: سراج الدين ابو يعقوب يوسف بن محمد السكاكي), commonly known as Sirāj al-Dīn al-Sakkākī (Arabic: سراج الدين السكاكي; 626–555 AH/ 1160–1229 CE) was a Persian Muslim scholar and a prominent figure in the Arabic language. He excelled in several fields, including grammar, rhetoric, morphology, semantics, prosody, and poetry. Al-Sakkākī is widely regarded as the leading rhetorician of his century, playing a pivotal role in the systematization of balāgha (Arabic rhetoric). His most celebrated work, Miftāḥ al-ʿUlūm (“The Key to the Disciplines”), a comprehensive treatise that became a cornerstone in the study of eloquence and literary expression in the Islamic tradition. Additionally, al-Sakkaki was not only proficient in Arabic but also well-versed in Turkish language and Persian language.

== Biography ==
Little is known about his life, due to the latter's finish coinciding with the conquest of al-Sakaki's native area by Mongols. There is a hagiographical account saying that he was originally a blacksmith until his thirties, which is dubious, considering the resemblance to the story of another scholar, al-Kaffal al-Marwazi. According to one account, when he was 30, he constructed an iron chest for the king and brought it to the court, where he met members gathered around a scholar. Sakkaki expressed his desire to become a scholar but was reproved for being too old. In response, he dedicated himself to learning. Ten years later, while journeying into mountains in frustration over the studying struggles, he looked at the rocks and decided that his heart was softer than them. Then, he rededicated himself to his studies and became a famous scholar.

In any case, it is recorded that he had connections with the state, in that he was said to have created a magical statue or image for the king at the time, 'Ala al-Din Khwarazm-Shah, for use in the war against the contemporary Abbasid caliph al-Nasir. Biographical literature also credited him with the ability to use magical powers to strike down cranes in mid-flight. Early in his life, he dabbled in magical and ritual practices, but he eventually abandoned them and devoted himself to pursue knowledge and scholarship.

He studied under the most renowned Hanafi jurists of his time, namely: Sadid al-Din al-Hayati, Ibn Sa'id al-Harithi, and Muhammad ibn Abd al-Karim al-Turkistani. He gained widespread fame in his era, to the extent that Yaqut al-Hamawi described him saying: “A jurist, theologian, and expert in various sciences. He is one of the most distinguished figures of his time, whose fame has spread far and wide.” He died in the year 626 AH/1229 AD.

== Works ==
1. Miftāḥ al-ʿUlūm ("The Key to Knowledge")
2. Kitab al-Jumal ("The Book of Sentences"), commentary on a pre-existing work al-Jumal by Abd al-Qahir al-Jurjani.
3. al-Tibyan ("The Clarification")
4. al-Tilasm ("The Talisman"), in Persian
5. Risalah fi 'Ilm al-Manazirah ("A Treatise on Debating")
6. Kitab al-Shamil wa Bahr al-Kamil ("The Encompassing Book and Ocean of Perfection")
