= Husayni Isfahani =

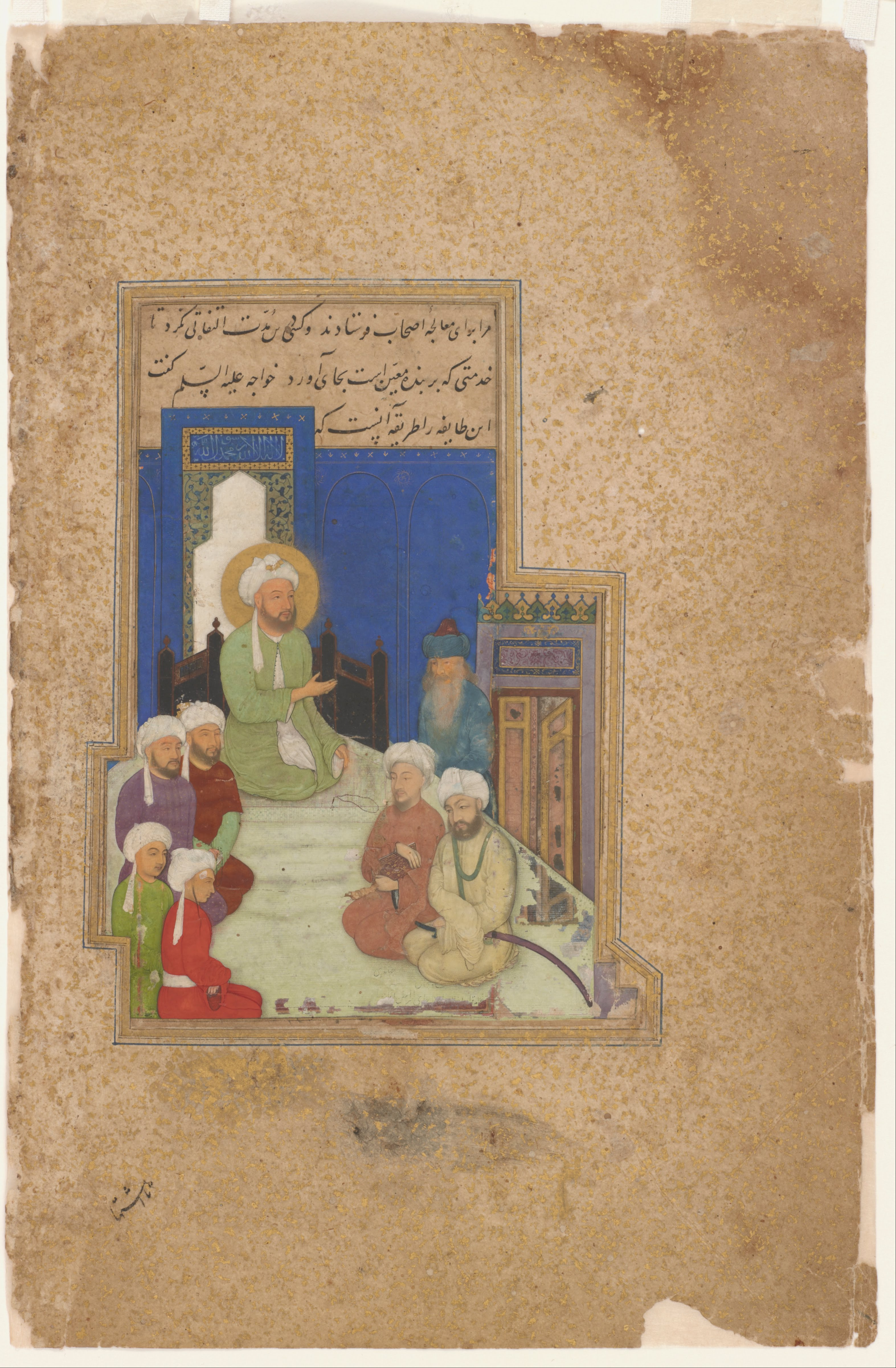
The Prophet and the Persian physician, miniature by ‛Abid. Mughal India, ca. 1645. Freer Gallery of Art

Ghiyāth al-Dīn ʿAlī ibn Ḥusayn ibn ʿAlī Amīrān Iṣfahānī (Arabic: غياث الدين على ابن حسينى ابن على اميرا الاصفهاني) was a fifteenth-century Persian physician and scientist from Isfahan, Iran. He was, in the words of Daniel Beben, 'a polymath in the service of several of the Timurid governors of Badakhshān in the second half of the 15th century' CE. Little is known of him beyond the works attributed to him.

== Works ==
- Asrār al-ḥurūf (870 AH/1465–1466 CE), dedicated to then governor of Badakhshān Abū Bakr, son of the Timurid ruler Abū Saʿīd Mirza.
- Dānish-nāma-i jahān, dedicated to Sulṭān Maḥmūd Mirza, also a son of Abū Saʿīd Mirza, governor of Badakhshān from 873/1469. This is Ghiyāth al-Dīn's best known work, a Persian encyclopedia of the natural sciences, concerned with meteorology, mineralogy, botany, and anatomy.
- Durrat al-misāḥa (890 AH/1485 CE), on measurements and geometry, likewise dedicated to Sulṭān Maḥmūd Mirza.
- Khulāṣat al-tanjīm va burhān al-taqvīm, on astronomy.
- Maʿārif al-taqvīm, also known as Nujūm, also on astronomy.
- A small treatise on foodstuffs, in table format, is preserved in the National Library of Medicine collection.

=== Ṣaḥīfat al-nāẓirīn ===
According to one recension of Ṣaḥīfat al-nāẓirīn ('pages for the readers'), also known as Tuḥfat al-nāẓirīn ('gift for the readers') and Sī ū shish ṣaḥīfa ('thirty-six chapters'), Ghiyāth al-Dīn also composed that text; Daniel Beben has accepted this attribution, arguing that its explicit Ismailism, which would have been unacceptable to the Timurids, implies that this text was composed before their conquest of Badakhshān. In Beben's assessment, 'the Ṣaḥīfat al-nāẓirīn is an important yet understudied work covering a series of topics related to Ismaili theology and doctrine, and is noteworthy for being the first Ismaili text known to have been composed within Badakhshān after Nāṣir-i Khusraw (d. after 462/1070)', who seems to have been the person who introduced Ismailism to that region.

Most manuscripts of the Ṣaḥīfat al-nāẓirīn attribute the text to the legendary pīr Sayyid Suhrāb Walī, though Beben has suggested that the original person behind this figure might himself have been Ghiyāth al-Dīn.

The date of composition of the work is usually stated to be 856/857 AH/1452–1453 CE. As of 2022, thirteen manuscripts of the text are known (two copied from the 1960 printed edition); the oldest manuscript was copied in 1137/1725.

==== Editions ====
- Sayyid Suhrāb Walī, Tuḥfat al-nāẓirīn, ed. by Qudratullāh Beg (1960)
- Sayyid Suhrāb Walī Badakhshānī, Sī ū shish ṣaḥīfa, ed. by Hūshang Ujāqī and Wladimir Ivanow (Tehran, 1961).

== See also ==
- List of Iranian scientists
