= Asrar al-Balagha =

Arabic Rhetorical work

Secrets of Eloquence
- Author: ʿAbd al-Qāhir al-Jurjānī
- Original title: أسرار البلاغة
- Language: Arabic
- Subject: Arabic rhetoric
- Publisher: Dar al-Risalah
- Publication date: 2007
- Publication place: Damascus / Beirut
- Pages: 304
- ISBN: 9789953320748

ʿAsrār al-Balāgha (Arabic: أسرار البلاغة, romanized: Secrets of Eloquence) is one of the seminal works of Arabic rhetoric, authored by the renowned 11th-century grammarian and literary theorist ʿAbd al-Qāhir al-Jurjānī (d. 1078/1079). The work explores imagery and figurative speech, providing a systematic framework for the identification, classification, and analysis of simile and metaphor. It remains a foundational reference for the study of comparative imagery in both traditional and modern Arabic literary criticism, and constitutes one half of al-Jurjānī's twin contributions to the development of ʿilm al-balāgha (the science of eloquence).

== Overview ==
In Asrār al-Balāgha, al-Jurjānī investigates how meanings in language are conveyed not only through straightforward expression but also, often more effectively through tamthīl (representation or analogy), metaphor, and figurative devices. He analyzes how the aesthetic force of literary language is shaped by the mind's ability to perceive indirect meanings, a process which requires both imaginative insight and intellectual analysis.

== Content ==
Central to Asrār al-Balāgha is the concept of tamthīl, which al-Jurjānī defines as the most significant form of indirect expression (majāz). Unlike conventional metaphors (istiʿāra) that create immediate and concrete comparisons, tamthīl functions by drawing abstract analogies between unlike domains, inviting the listener to engage intellectually with the expression.

Al‑Jurjānī illustrates tamthīl with examples such as “the hand of the north wind,” noting that the wind, lacking physical parts, cannot literally possess a hand. Instead, the metaphor assigns to it a quality, such as power or impact through imaginative transference.

He further distinguishes between two types of metaphor: informative metaphors, where the comparison is evident and direct, and tamthīl-based metaphors, which require reflection due to the subtlety of the relationship. The latter, he argues, often produces a stronger aesthetic effect because of its visual vividness and a quality he calls strangeness (gharāba). This unfamiliarity invites deeper engagement and pleasure, as the listener perceives harmony between concepts typically seen as unrelated.

To explain this process, al-Jurjānī draws on poetic and Qur'anic examples. One such image compares those who bear sacred knowledge but do not understand it to donkeys carrying books (Qur'an 62:5). The metaphor does not rely on physical resemblance but on the cognitive leap needed to understand its moral implication, demonstrating how tamthīl can transmit layered meanings with rhetorical force.

== Legacy and Influence ==
The influence of Asrār al-Balāgha was profound, shaping Arabic literary theory throughout the medieval period. It was cited by scholars like Ibn Khaldūn, who praised it as representative of the deep intellectual analysis involved in the science of eloquence. The treatise contributed significantly to the intellectual foundation of Arabic literary criticism and is still studied today in fields related to rhetoric, poetics, and Qur'anic exegesis.

== See also ==
- Dala'il al-I'jaz
- List of Sunni books
