= Dala'il al-I'jaz =

Work of Arabic literary theory

The Proofs of Inimitability in the Qur'ān
- Editor: Mahmoud Mohamed Shaker
- Author: 'Abd al-Qāhir al-Jurjānī
- Original title: دلائل الإعجاز في القرآن
- Language: Arabic
- Subject: I'jaz al-Qur'ān, Arabic rhetoric
- Publisher: Dar al-Khanji
- Publication date: 2004
- Publication place: Cairo, Egypt
- Pages: 688

Dalā'il al-I'jāz fī al-Qur'ān (Arabic: دلائل الإعجاز في القرآن, romanized: The Proofs of Inimitability in the Qur'ān) is a foundational work of Arabic literary theory and Arabic rhetoric written by the 11th-century Persian-born grammarian and theorist 'Abd al-Qāhir al-Jurjānī (d. 1078 CE / 471 AH). It is widely regarded as a pioneering text in the field of ʿilm al-balāgha (Arabic rhetorical science), and a cornerstone in the study of the inimitability of the Qur'ān (I'jāz al-Qur'ān).

Written in the city of Jurjān, the treatise presents a radical linguistic theory that redefined how eloquence (faṣāḥa) and literary power are understood. Its influence extended across disciplines such as Qur'anic exegesis (tafsir), grammar (naḥw), semantics, and classical poetics, and helped formalize rhetoric as a scientific discipline in the Islamic world.

== Background ==
Dalā'il al-I'jāz emerged in a period of intense theological and linguistic debate concerning the miraculous nature of the Qur'ān. Earlier scholars had attributed its inimitability to either divine intervention, unmatched poetic beauty, or its power to affect hearts. Al-Jurjānī, however, contended that such approaches were insufficiently rigorous. He argued that the Qur'ān's inimitability lies in its naẓm the unique, precise, and semantically charged arrangement of words and grammatical structures. The work was composed in response to various speculative and apologetic arguments, including those advanced by the Mu'tazilites and Ash'arites, but it transcended polemics to offer a detailed linguistic model rooted in syntax and semantics.

== Content ==
Al-Jurjānī revolutionized Arabic poetics and the doctrine of i'jāz al-Qur'ān (the inimitability of the Qur'ān) by proposing that its miraculous nature stemmed not merely from vocabulary, but from the perfect synthesis between meanings (ma'ānī) and expressions (alfāẓ). In his seminal work Dalā'il al-I'jāz ("Signs of Inimitability"), he surpassed earlier literary theorists who focused on rhetorical ornamentation by advancing a theory of literary structure rooted in mental logic, harmony, and syntax. His aim was not just to describe eloquence but to define why the Qur'ān was inimitable by developing a general theory of rhetoric and poetics.

One of al-Jurjānī's greatest intellectual contributions was his theory of naẓm, the arrangement of words to produce coherent and powerful meaning. Rejecting the inherited notion that meanings were static “motifs” from pre-Islamic poetry, he argued that meaning only emerges through syntactic construction. In his view, grammar (naḥw) was not mechanical but cognitive and situational, shaping both expression and perception.

Al-Jurjānī analyzed how Arabic sentence structure mirrors thought patterns: verbal expressions are selected according to intended meaning, context, and nuance making naẓm the bridge between linguistic form and conceptual clarity. This theory connected syntactic structure with rhetorical purpose, influencing generations of grammarians and rhetoricians.

== Legacy and Influence ==
Dalā'il al-I'jāz is considered one of the most influential works in the history of Arabic literary theory. Al-Jurjānī’s insights shaped the way scholars interpreted the Qur'ān, classical poetry, and prose, with his theory of naẓm becoming central to later rhetorical analysis.

Al-Zamakhsharī's commentary known as al-Kashshāf was notably influenced by the rhetorical theories of ʿAbd al-Qāhir al-Jurjānī, particularly his concept of naẓm, the arrangement of words and meanings in a harmonious structure. Drawing on al-Jurjānī's Dalā'il al-I'jāz, al-Zamakhsharī applied principles of balāgha to his Qur'ānic commentary, making al-Kashshāf the first tafsīr to emphasize rhetorical analysis.

To this day, Dalā'il al-I'jāz is studied in traditional Islamic seminaries and modern university departments concerned with Arabic linguistics, rhetoric, Quranic studies, and philosophy of language. Its emphasis on form-meaning relationships has drawn comparisons to modern linguistic structuralism and semantic theory.

== Editions ==
The most widely circulated printed edition was prepared by Muḥammad Rashīd Riḍā in Cairo (1902), and it remains in academic use today. Other modern editions have been published by Dār al-Jīl, Dār al-Ma'ārif, and scholarly presses in Beirut, Damascus, and Tehran.

== See also ==
- Asrar al-Balagha
- I'jaz
- List of Sunni books
