= Oğuz Han Aynaoğlu =

Turkish footballer (born 1992)

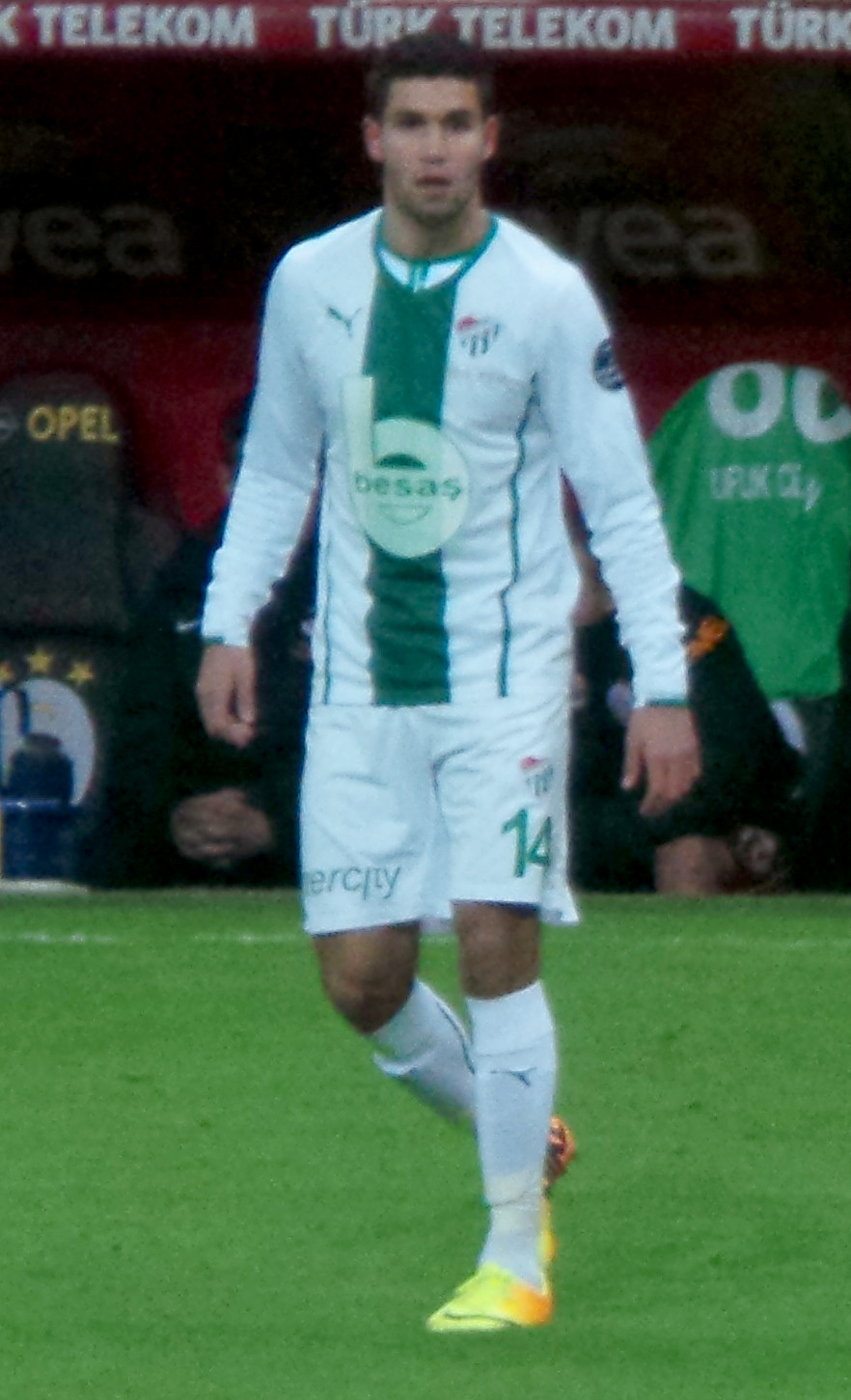

Personal information
- Date of birth: 22 March 1992 (age 34)
- Place of birth: Farum, Denmark
- Height: 5 ft 9 in (1.75 m)
- Position: Winger

Team information
- Current team: Erbaaspor
- Number: 7

Youth career
- Glostrup FK
- 2005–2006: Brøndby IF
- 2008–2011: FC Nordsjælland

Senior career*
Years	Team	Apps	(Gls)
2011–2014	FC Nordsjælland	10	(1)
2014–2016	Bursaspor	5	(0)
2014–2015	→ Adana Demirspor (loan)	33	(5)
2015–2016	→ Kardemir Karabükspor (loan)	17	(3)
2016–2017	Çaykur Rizespor	11	(1)
2017–2018	Adanaspor	33	(3)
2019–2020	Altay	19	(0)
2020	Menemenspor	4	(0)
2020–2023	Balıkesirspor	72	(4)
2023–2024	24 Erzincanspor	26	(3)
2024–	Erbaaspor	67	(16)

International career
2008–2009	Denmark U17	6	(0)
2009	Denmark U18	1	(0)
2011–2012	Denmark U20	4	(0)
- * Club domestic league appearances and goals as of 1 October 2026

Oğuz Han Aynaoğlu (born 22 March 1992) is a Danish professional footballer who plays as a winger for TFF 2. Lig club Erbaaspor. He has amassed a total 11 youth caps for Denmark under three different age groups.

== Early life ==
Aynaoğlu began his football career in the youth system of Brøndby, before moving to FC Nordsjælland.

== Senior career ==
=== Nordsjælland ===
Following this debut, Aynaoğlu made two additional appearances in the spring of 2011. His strong performances earned him a place in the first-team squad for the 2011–12 season. However, during his time at Nordsjælland, he struggled to secure a regular spot in the starting lineup. In the 2011–12 season, he featured in just one league match, and the following season (2012–13) saw him make seven appearances.

In January 2014, after limited playing time and a series of injuries, Aynaoğlu left the club. Although he faced challenges in his final season, particularly with injuries, he did manage to play more frequently in the autumn months.

=== Bursaspor ===
On 5 January 2014 it was confirmed, that Aynaoğlu was sold to Turkish club Bursaspor. He played nine games on loan for Adanaspor in the first half season.

==== Loan to Adana Demirspor ====
After Aynaoğlu's first season at Bursaspor, the club underwent changes in management, including a new board and manager. Following this shift, Aynaoğlu was loaned out to Adana Demirspor after just half a season at Bursaspor. He later revealed that the new management had neither seen him play nor train, but decided to loan him out without consulting him.

At Adana Demirspor, Aynaoğlu quickly became a regular starter and enjoyed a successful stint, which he later described as a breakthrough in Turkish football. Over the course of his loan, he made 40 appearances and scored six goals before returning to Bursaspor.

==== Back in Bursaspor ====
Aynaoğlu returned to Bursaspor following a successful season at Adana Demirspor, where he was informed by the club that they intended to give him another opportunity. He participated in a training camp with the squad in Germany, featuring in several friendly matches. However, Aynaoğlu later revealed that while the coach expressed a desire to include him in the team's plans, the club preferred to sign more experienced players who had competed at a higher level. As a result, Aynaoğlu did not have the chance to establish himself in the first team and subsequently left the club on loan.

==== Loan to Karabükspor ====
Aynaoğlu was loaned to Kardemir Karabükspor on 26 August 2015. The player later revealed that he had the option to remain at Bursaspor, but chose not to take the risk. During his loan spell, Aynaoğlu made 24 appearances and scored four goals before leaving the club at the end of the season.

=== Rizespor ===
Aynaoğlu signed for Süper Lig-side Çaykur Rizespor in the summer 2016. Aynaoğlu scores his first goal in the Süper Lig in April 2017 against Fenerbahçe. His contract got terminated in the summer of 2017.

=== Adanaspor ===
On 26 August 2017, Aynaoğlu signed for newly relegated TFF First League club Adanaspor.

=== Altay SK ===
Aynaoğlu signed with Altay and joined the club on 1 January 2019.

== International career ==
Aynaoğlu was part of the Danish under-20 team that won the 2011 Milk Cup in Northern Ireland.

== Career statistics ==
=== Club ===
As of 21 September 2011

Club	Season	League		Cup		Continental		Other		Total	
Club	Season	Apps	Goals	Apps	Goals	Apps	Goals	Apps	Goals	Apps	Goals
F.C. Nordsjælland	2010–11	2	0	0	0	0	0	0	0	2	0
F.C. Nordsjælland	2011–12	1	0	1	0	0	0	0	0	2	0
F.C. Nordsjælland	Total	3	0	1	0	0	0	0	0	4	0
Career total		3	0	1	0	0	0	0	0	4	0

== Honours ==
Nordsjælland

- Danish Cup: 2010–11

Denmark U20

- Milk Cup Elite: 2011
