= Abd al-Qahir al-Jurjani =

11th-century Persian grammarian of Arabic

Imam Abd al-Qāhir al-Jurjānī
- العبد القاهر الجرجاني
- Title: Imām al-`Arabiyyah; Majd ad-Din

Personal life
- Born: 1009 Gorgan
- Died: 1078 (aged 68–69) Gorgan
- Era: Islamic golden age
- Region: Khurasan
- Main interest(s): Arabic grammar, Literary theory, Arabic rhetoric
- Notable work(s): Dalā'il al-I'jāz; Asrār al-Balāgha
- Occupation: Scholar, Grammarian, Literary theorist, Rhetorician, Linguist, Theologian, Logician

Religious life
- Religion: Islam
- Denomination: Sunni
- Jurisprudence: Shafi'i
- Creed: Ash'ari

Muslim leader
- Influenced by: Al-Shafi'i Abu al-Hasan al-Ash'ari Sibawayh Abu Ali al-Farisi
- Influenced: Al-Zamakhshari Fakhr al-Din al-Razi Siraj al-Din al-Sakaki Jalal al-Din al-Qazwini

ʿAbd al-Qāhir ibn ʿAbd al-Raḥmān al-Jurjānī (Arabic: عبد القاهر بن عبد الرحمن الجرجاني), commonly known as Abd al-Qāhir al-Jurjānī (Arabic: عبد القاهر الجرجاني), was a Persian Sunni scholar based in Gorgan in the 4th century AH/11th century AD. He was a leading Arab grammarian and philologist in his day. He is widely regarded as one of the greatest literary theorists in medieval Islam. Al-Jurjānī is considered a founding figure in establishing Arabic rhetoric (ʿilm al-balāgha) as an independent science. Widely regarded as a towering figure in the intellectual history of the Islamic Golden Age, al-Jurjānī transformed centuries of Arabic grammatical, philological, and poetic traditions into a rigorous theory of linguistic beauty centered on the concepts of eloquence (faṣāḥa) and syntactic harmony (naẓm).

His two masterworks: Dalā'il al-I'jāz (“The Proofs of Inimitability”) and Asrār al-Balāgha (“The Secrets of Eloquence”) are considered foundational texts in the field of Arabic rhetoric. Together, they codified a system of literary analysis that deeply influenced Qurʾānic exegesis, classical poetry, and rhetorical education across the Islamic world for nearly a millennium. Al-Jurjānī’s synthesis of grammar and literary aesthetics not only shaped the development of balāgha as an independent discipline, but also earned him lasting reverence as a pioneer of Arabic linguistic thought.

== Life ==
ʿAbd al-Qāhir al-Jurjānī was born around 400 AH / 1010 CE in the city of Jurjān (also known as Gorgan), a historical town in northeastern Iran near the Caspian Sea. He lived during the Buyid period, a time marked by intellectual vibrancy, Persian resurgence, and the flourishing of Arabic scholarship among non-Arab scholars in the eastern Islamic world.

He studied grammar and linguistics under Abu’l-Ḥosayn Fāresī, a student and nephew of Abū ʿAlī al-Fārisī (d. 377 AH / 987 CE), a legendary grammarian of the Basran school. While al-Jurjānī likely never met Abū ʿAlī directly due to the age gap, he was heavily influenced by his teachings and engaged deeply with his masterwork, al-Idāḥ. Al-Jurjānī eventually authored an extensive commentary on it: al-Mughnī fī Sharḥ al-Idāḥ, reflecting his deep admiration and intellectual allegiance.

ʿAbd al-Qāhir al-Jurjānī spent the entirety of his academic career in his hometown of Jurjān, where he became a central figure in the intellectual and linguistic life of the region. Unlike many scholars of his era who sought patronage in major urban centers such as Baghdad, Nishapur, or Rayy, al-Jurjānī chose to remain rooted in his provincial environment, dedicating himself fully to teaching, writing, and worship.

Al-Jurjānī's reputation drew students from across the Islamic world, earning the title “Imam of Arabic” in recognition of his mastery and authority in the field. He worked independently and did not affiliate himself with any royal court, which contributed to the perception of his intellectual integrity and scholarly independence. Al-Jurjānī was known for his piety, asceticism and tranquility. Al-Silafī mentioned him in his biographical dictionary, saying: “He was devout and content. A thief once entered upon him while he was in prayer and stole what he found, and ʿAbd al-Qāhir saw him but did not break his prayer.”

He died in 471 AH / 1078 CE, likely in Jurjān (Gorgan, the city where he had spent his entire life.

== Legacy ==
Al-Jurjānī's legacy in Arabic rhetoric and linguistics is monumental. He is widely credited with founding the science of Arabic rhetoric (ʿilm al-balāgha) as a coherent and theoretical discipline, particularly the branch of ʿilm al-bayān (the science of rhetorical clarity, including metaphor and simile). His works did not merely catalog examples of eloquence but instead explained the inner mechanisms by which language produces meaning, beauty, and emotional impact.

His concept of naẓm, the syntactic and semantic arrangement of words introduced a radically new understanding of eloquence: that rhetorical power arises not simply from isolated words, but from the interdependence and harmony of structure and meaning. This insight revolutionized Arabic literary theory, Qurʾanic exegesis (tafsīr), and the philosophy of language.

Later scholars such as al-Sakkākī and Jalāl al-Din Qazwīnī would build upon al-Jurjānī's theories, developing balāgha into a formal science with its own subdivisions, a structure still taught in traditional Islamic seminaries across the Muslim world today. Beyond rhetoric, al-Jurjānī’s contributions to Arabic grammar (naḥw) and morphology (taṣrīf) reshaped through works like al-Mughnī fī Sharḥ al-Idāḥ and al-ʿUmda fī al-Taṣrīf, fortified the grammatical tradition of the Basran school and shaped the way Arabic was taught and understood for centuries.

== Works ==
- Dalā'il al-I'jāz (The Proofs of Inimitability)
- Asrār al-Balāgha (The Secrets of Elucidation)
- Al-Awāmil al-Mi’ah (The Hundred Elements) - A short text on 100 modifiers, or particles, in Arabic and their different uses with examples.
- Al-Jumal (Sentences)
- Kitab ʿArūd (Poetic Structure)
- Al-Maghna fī Sharḥ al-Idah’, thirty volumes
- Al-Miftāḥ (The Key), a famous book on Arabic morphology.
- Muʿjam al-taʿrifāt (Compendium of Definitions)
- Al-Muqtasad, a short version of Al Maghna.
- Sharḥ al-Fātiḥa fī Mujallad (Explaining Al-Fatiha in a Volume)
- Al-Talkhiss bi Sharḥihi (The Brief of Sentence Elucidation)
- Al-'Umhad fī al-Taṣrīf (The Basis of Morphology)
- An anthology collection on the works of Abi-tammam, al-Buh'turi, and al-Mutannabī.

== See also ==
- List of Ash'aris

== Bibliography ==
- Deeb, K. Abu (2007). "al-Jurjānī, Abū Bakr Abd al-Qāhir b. Abd al- Rahmān (d. 471/1078)". In Bearman, P.; Bianquis, Th.; Bosworth, C.E.; Donzel, E. van; Heinrichs, W.P. (eds.). Encyclopaedia of Islam. Brill Online: Brill.
- Sutherland (Consultant), John (1999). "Vol.1 A-K". In Murray, Chris (ed.). Encyclopedia of Literary Critics and Criticism. London: Fitzroy Dearborn.
- Abbs, Ihsn (1971). Tarikh al-Naqd al-Adabi 'inda al-'Arab, Naqd al-Shi'r min al-Qarn al-Thani hattá al-Qarn al-Thamin al-Hijri. History of Arabic Literary Criticism (A comprehensive study of Arabic literary criticism from the second century to the eighth century AH. It covers most of the literary critics from al-Asma'ei to Ibn-Khaldoun.). Beirut: Dr al-Amnah.
- Jurjānī (al-), Abd Al-Qāhir (1972). Khafagi, Muhammad Abdul Mun'em (ed.). Asrar al-Balaghah. Cairo: Maktabet al Qāhira.
- Jurjānī (al-), Abd Al-Qāhir (1991). Khafagi, Muhammad Abdul Mun'em; Sharaf, Abdul Aziz (eds.). Asrar al-Balaghah. Beirut: Dar Al Jeel.
- Jurjānī (al-), Abd Al-Qāhir (1959). Al Imam Al Sheikh, Mohammad Abdo; Ridah, Mohammad Rashid (eds.). Asrar al-Balaghah in the Art of Rhetoric (6th ed.). Midan Al Azhar: Mohammad Ali Subeih.
- Jurjānī (al-), Abd Al-Qāhir (1972). Haydar, Ali (ed.). al-Jummal. Damascus.
- Jurjānī (al-), Abd Al-Qāhir (1990). Usri Abd al-Ghani, Abdallah (ed.). al-Jummal in Grammar (1st ed.). Beirut: Dar Al Kutub al Ilmieh.
- Muttaleb, Muhammad Abdul (1995). Mahmoud Ali Makki (ed.). Issues of Modernism in the works of Abd-al-Qāhir al-Jurjānī. Egypt: Longman.
- Key, Alexander (2018). "Translation of Poetry from Persian to Arabic: ʿAbd al-Qāhir al-Jurjānī and Others". Journal of Abbasid Studies. 5 (1–2): 146–176. doi:10.1163/22142371-12340037. S2CID 201011701.
- Noy, Avigail (2018). "The Legacy of ʿAbd al-Qāhir al-Jurjānī in the Arabic East before al-Qazwīnī's Talkhīṣ al-Miftāḥ". Journal of Abbasid Studies. 5 (1–2): 11–57. doi:10.1163/22142371-12340036. S2CID 198592091.
- Lockett, Abraham (1814). Pereira, P. (ed.). Mi'ut Amil and Shurhoo Mi,ut Amil, two elementary treatises on Arabic Syntax (by 'Abd al-Kahir ibn 'Abd al-Rahman, al-Jurjani). Calcutta: The Hindoostan Press.
