= Jalal al-Din Muhammad al-Isfahani =

Persian physician

Jalal al-Din Muhammad al-Isfahani was a 19th-century Persian physician from Isfahan.

Jalal al-Din Muhammad al-Isfahani, who refers to himself as al-tabib al-Isfahani ("the physician of Isfahan"), composed an Arabic general treatise on therapeutics, arranged in order from head to foot. It was completed on 9 December 1828. The date of completion is given in another copy of the treatise now at the University of California at Los Angeles Biomedical Library, Coll. 1062, MS Ar. 36.

The National Library of Medicine has one of three recorded copies of this treatise. There is also a Persian treatise titled Dastur-i Jalali by the same author, presumably a translation of the original Arabic.

Another Persian treatise on the preservation of health in the human body, Hifz-i sihhat-i badan al-insaniyah is presumably by the same author, but it is said to have been dedicated to the ruler Abu al-Muzaffar Abu al-Mansur Shah Sulayman al-Safawi al-Musawi Bahadur Khan, who ruled from 1666 to 1694. This 17th-century date however would conflict with that found in the therapeutic treatise preserved in copies at UCLA and at NLM.

== Sources ==
- A.Z. Iskandar, A Descriptive List of Arabic Manuscripts on Medicine and Science at the University of California, Los Angeles (Leiden: Brill, 1984), p. 41.
- C.A. Storey, Persian Literature: A Bio-Bibliographical Survey. Volume II, Part 2: E. Medicine (London: Royal Asiatic Society, 1971), p. 263-4 no. 450

== See also ==
- List of Iranian scientists
