= Tugon Tura Mausoleum =

- Interactive map of the Tugon Tura Mausoleum area

General information
- Location: Yusuf Tashpulatov Street, Itchan Kala neighborhood, Khiva, Khorazm Region, Uzbekistan
- Coordinates: 41.38081764659178°N 60.36101270273287°E
- Year built: 8th century
- Renovated: 19th century
- Demolished: 13th century
- Owner: State Property

Technical details
- Material: baked brick

References
- Tugʻon Turk maqbarasi xaritada

Tugon Tura Mausoleum is an architectural monument in Khiva, Khorazm Region, Republic of Uzbekistan. The mausoleum dates back to the 19th century, and today it is located in the Yusuf Tashpulatov Street, "Itchan-Kala", Khiva. The object is a one-domed building located in a residential neighborhood to the north of the Toshhovli Palace.

On 4 October 2019, by the decision of the cabinet of ministers of the Republic of Uzbekistan, the Tugon Tura Mausoleum was included in the national list of real estate objects of Tangible Cultural Heritage and received state protection. Currently, the Cultural Heritage Department of Khorezm Region is state property based on the right of operational management.

== History ==
The mausoleum is located on Zargarlar Street, near the Itchan Kala, in the northwest corner of the Toshhovli Palace. The mausoleum was built in honor of Togun Tura (or Turak), who was originally from Turkish Muslims and was one of the ambassadors sent to Khorezm by Qutayba ibn Muslim, who conquered Khorezm in 712. At the beginning of the 13th century, the mausoleum was seriously damaged when Genghis Khan's troops destroyed almost the entire city.

The mausoleum was rebuilt in the 19th century. The foundation of the mausoleum building reaches a depth of one meter from the ground level. Because of this, it is shown that the building of the mausoleum is ancient.

The information about Togon Turak Ota has not reached us. According to the historian of the Khiva Khanate, Muhammad Yusuf Bayani, his grave is located inside the Konya Ark Palace. According to another historian, Togon Turk Ota was from Turkic tribes and served as a military commander under Abu Muslim Khorasani. Abu Muslim Khurasani fled to Khorezm after he was about to be killed in Fergana and spent the last years of his life there. After his death, the residents of the city built a mausoleum in honor of Togon Turak Ota.
