= Kazi Kalyan Madrasah =

Madrasa in Khiva, Khorazm, Uzbekistan

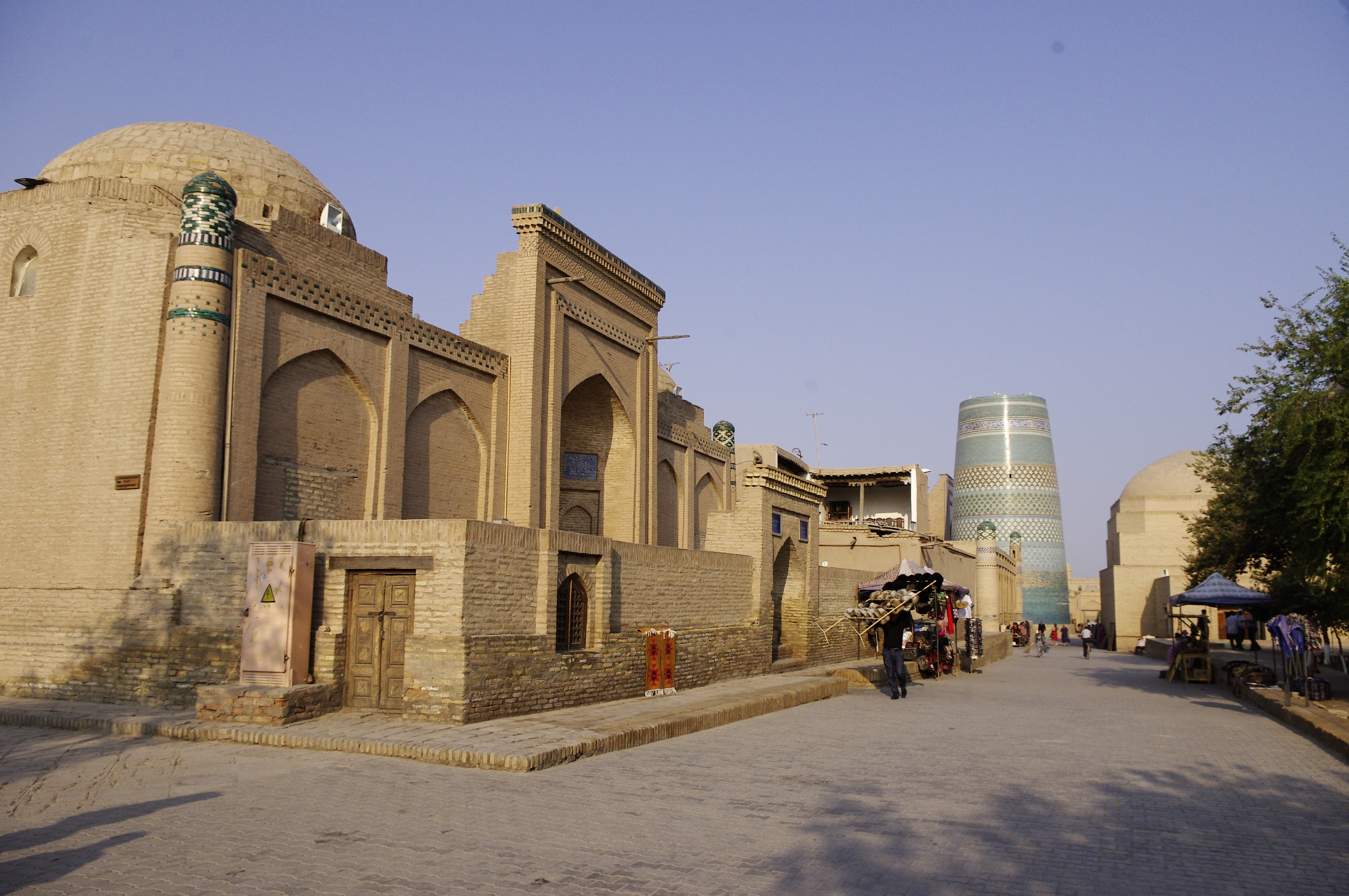
- Interactive map of the Kazi Kalyan Madrasah area

General information
- Architectural style: Central Asian Architecture
- Location: Pahlavon Mahmud Street, Itchan Kala, Khiva, Khorazm Region, Uzbekistan
- Coordinates: 41°22′40″N 60°21′33″E
- Year built: 1905

Technical details
- Floor count: 2
- Floor area: 32.5 × 23.4 m

Kazi Kalyan madrasah is an architectural monument (1905) in Khiva, Uzbekistan. The madrasah is part of the Itchan Kala. The Kazi Kalyan Madrasah is part of the monuments of the Itchan Kala Museum-Reserve. The structure is located between Juma Mosque (Khiva) and Matniyoz Devonbegi Madrasah. It was built in 1905 by the chief judge of Khorezm, Mohammad Salih Okhund.

Mohammad Salih Okhund was the son of Bobohun Salimov, was the first minister of justice of the Khorezm People's Soviet Republic. When Salikh Akhun was 30 years old, he was appointed as the chief judge of the city of Khiva. After that, due to his strong knowledge and talent, he worked in this position for a long time until the end of his life.

Now it is an object of cultural heritage of Uzbekistan. It is a tourist service and exhibition facility, where the Khorezm Music Art History Museum is located. In the exhibition, objects reflecting the history of the development of Khorezm musical art from ancient times to the present day are displayed.

Famous Khorezm masters Khudaibergan Haji, Qalandar Kochum, Matjon Kulimov, Bagbek Abdurahmanov, Vais Kulol and others took part in the construction of the madrasa.

== Architecture ==
The main facade of the madrasah faces the city street. The madrasa has a rectangular layout (32.5 × 23.4 m), a dome-roofed building, a classroom (4.7 × 4.7 m layout), and a courtyard (16.6 × 9.8 m). Bouquet-like patterns are made on two corners of the headboard (they are decorated with green and blue tiles); the entrance to the mionsaray is through the gate, there is a mosque and a madrasa on both sides of the mionsaray. Madrasah has 16 rooms. The doors and windows of the madrasah cells were built facing the veranda. Each room has a separate fireplace. A well was dug in the porch, its depth reaches 8–10 meters. The ceiling and walls are decorated with colored tiles; the upper part of the outer and inner side of the wall is framed with a row of horizontal green "fillet", flat arches are made on the walls.

In addition to religious sciences, fiqh-shari'a laws, various zakat and tax collection, i.e. jurisprudence were taught in Kazi Kalyan madrasah. Because in the Khiva Khanate, which became a semi-colony of Russian Empire, all kinds of property claims and heresies against Islam began to spread. In such a situation, increasing the knowledge of society on Islamic jurisprudence becomes even more urgent. Among those who studied at the madrasa, many justices, learned presidents and mirzas have grown up. Teacher Abdulla Boltayev informed that 35 students studied at the madrasa.

Currently, the "History of Khorezm Music" museum is located in the Kazi Kalyan madrasa. The exhibition space is 125 square meters. Among the exhibits, there are 352 exhibits showing the history of the development of Khorezm musical art from ancient times to the present. Visitors to the museum can voluntarily listen to the tunes and songs of the ancient Khorezm musics.
