= Matrasulboy Mirzaboshi Madrasah =

Madrasa in Khiva, Khorazm, Uzbekistan

Matrasulboy Mirzaboshi madrasah
- Muhammad Rasul Mirzaboshi Madrasah
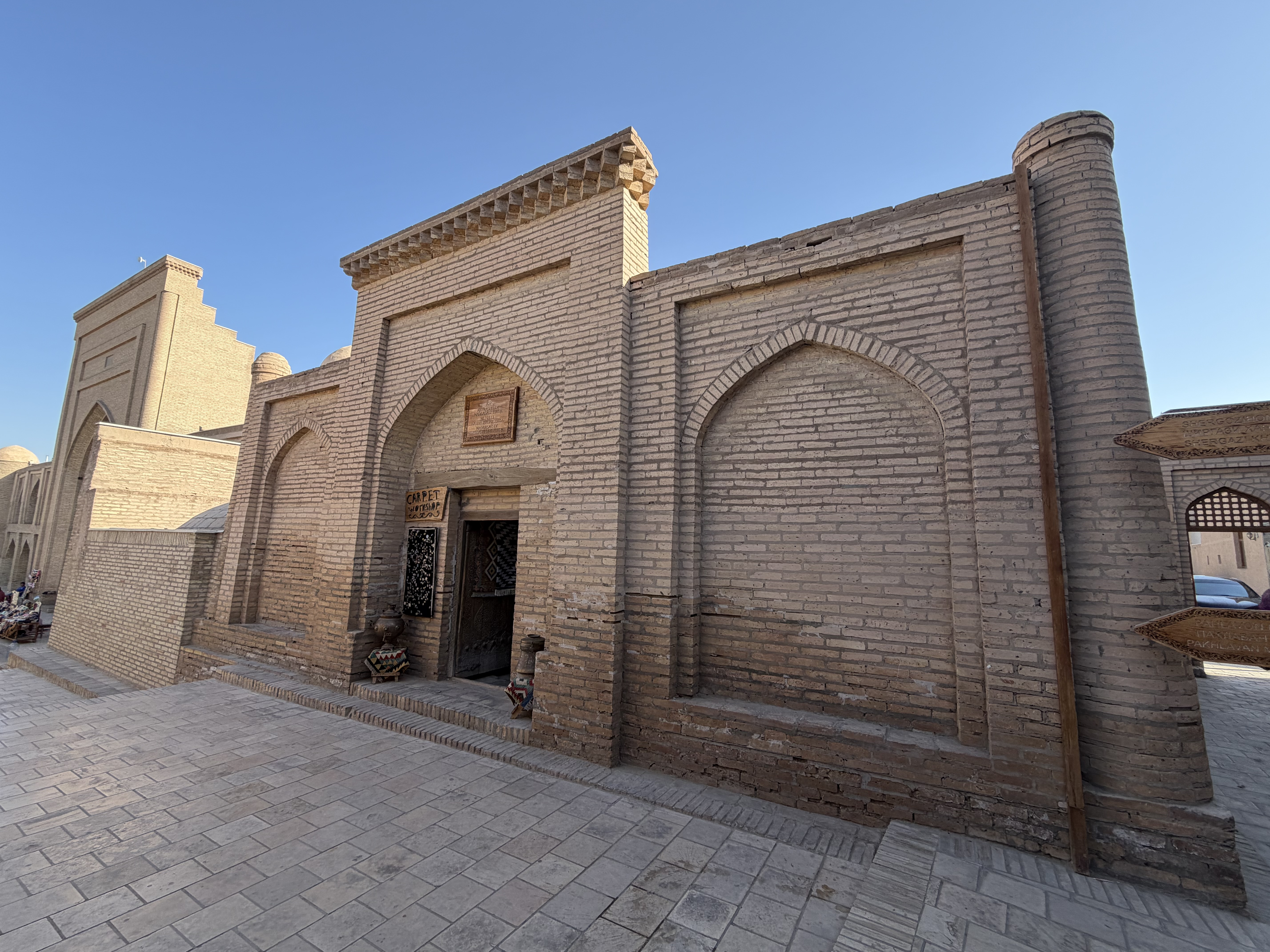
- Interactive map of the Matrasulboy Mirzaboshi madrasah area

General information
- Location: 7, Pahlavon Mahmud street, Itchan Kala, Khiva, Khorazm Region, Uzbekistan
- Coordinates: 41.37694178220662°N 60.35885419627106°E
- Year built: 1905
- Owner: State Heritage

Technical details
- Material: brick, wood

Matrasulboy Mirzaboshi Madrasah (or Muhammad Rasul Mirzaboshi Madrasah) is a historical site in Khiva, Khorezm region. The madrasah founded in 1905 (in some sources the year 1906). It is located today at 7 Pahlavon Mahmud street, "Itchan Kala" neighborhood, Khiva. The madrasa was built by Muhammad Matrasulboy Mirzaboshi, the son of poet and composer Muhammad Niyaz Mirzaboshi (Kamil Khorazmi) from Khiva. Matrasulboy Mirzaboshi was born in 1839 and received his primary education from his father, Kamil Khorazmi. He also learned foreign languages from Qazi Abdullah. In particular, he knew the Arabic and Persian languages well, and was familiar with oriental poetry. In 1906, with the support of his father, Matrasulboy founded the first musical score for percussion instruments in Central Asia.

Matrasulboy Mirzaboshi died in 1921 at the age of 83.

On October 4, 2019, by the decision of the Cabinet of Ministers of the Republic of Uzbekistan, the historical object was included in the national list of real estate objects of tangible cultural heritage and received state protection. Currently, the madrasa "Itchan Kala" state museum-reserve belongs to the state property based on the right of operational management.

== History ==
Some sources say that this historical object is the smallest madrasah in Khiva. The madrasah is so small and shows traditional building rules are not followed at all in the construction of it. Matrasulboy Mirzaboshi madrasah is located on the north side of Shergazikhan madrasah, on the road, and has one-story wooden doors with elegant carvings. Currently, a embroidery workshop and a carpet shop operate in the madrasah building.

== See also ==
- Khiva
- Itchan Kala
- Dishan Kala
- Poyanda mausoleum
- Yusuf Yasovulboshi Madrasah
- Shergazikhan Madrasah
