= Ishrat Hovli =

- Interactive map of the Ishrat Hovli area

General information
- Type: Historical monument
- Location: Ichan Qala, Khiva, Uzbekistan
- Year built: 1832–1834

Technical details
- Size: 43 × 36.5 meters
- Floor count: 2

Ishrat Hovli is a historical monument in the citadel of Khiva, Ichan Qala, built in 1832–1834. The building is located in the eastern part of the Tash Hauli and served as a hotel for the guests of the ruler.

Currently, it is included in the list of the material cultural heritage of Uzbekistan of republican significance and World Heritage Site.

== History ==
Ishrat Hovli was commissioned by Allakuli Khan as an annex in the courtyard of the Tash Hauli, which was the main palace of the Khan of Khiva at that time. The total area of the construction is 43 × 36.5 meters. The building was used for ceremonies, cultural entertainment and ambassador receptions. The southern entrance to the rooms ran through a one-columned entrance. The main entrance is decorated with carved wooden columns and panjara (patterned window lattice in the countries of medieval Central Asia). The entrance portal of the building is adorned with majolica with a bright, painted ceiling and small towers on the sides, which resemble the theater in the interior and are full of solemnity. The interior of the building is decorated with carvings according to gancha (binder, artificial or (rarely) natural plaster mixture), muqarnas and flowering trees and fruits in black, blue and red. In the middle of the courtyard, a round brick place was erected for the summer holidays.

Around the perimeter of the courtyard in Ishrat Hovli, guest rooms and services with iwan are arranged on the second floor, and in the middle of the courtyard, on a raised, round place, a yurt was traditionally erected for the receptions of nomadic guests. In Ishrat Hovli, the construction date of 1832 was engraved on the marble base of the large iwan.

First, the traditional courtyard of receptions — Arzhon and then Ishrat-Hauli were built. Both courtyards are decorated with high quinces, and their south side is closed by the main hall. On the other three sides, the courtyards were surrounded by premises for courtiers. Above them on the second floor are rooms with deep loggias, whose roofs are supported by slender carved columns. Here Khan conducted an analysis of complaints and conducted the court, and through a special exit the convicts were taken to public execution.

In the planning, the builders of the palace relied both on the traditions of ancient Khorezmian mansions (for example, the organization of the female half in the harem) and on the tradition of fortress architecture, which was expressed in the organization of the external deaf facades.
