= Shergazikhan Madrasah =

Madrasa in Khiva, Khorazm, Uzbekistan

General information
- Architectural style: Central Asian Architecture
- Location: 23, Pahlavon Mahmud Street, Itchan Kala, Khiva, Khorazm Region, Uzbekistan
- Year built: 1719-1726
- Owner: State Heritage

Technical details
- Material: brick

Shergazikhan Madrasah is an architectural monument in Khiva (1719-1726). It is one of the many buildings in the Itchan Kala. According to the sources, it was built in 1719–1726 with the funds and decree of the Uzbek ruler Shergazikhan (Shir Ghazi Khan). It is located in the center of Itchan Kala, at the entrance to the Pahlavon Mahmud complex. The construction of the structure began during Shergozikhan's campaign to Khurasan. Khan's body was buried in a small room built in the west of the madrasah.

== Architecture ==
The main buildings of the madrasa are connected to each other. The madrasah is 2 floors. At the entrance through a huge gate, there is a domed miyansarai, a mosque with a dome and a classroom are located in two corners of it. The small rooms above the miyansarai were the dormitories for students. Shelves, takhmon, bowls are made on the walls. A row of 1-story rooms around the courtyard has a front porch, and there is a pool in the middle of the courtyard. The number of cells is 55. Madrasah decorations are not preserved. The facades are made of black stone, the courtyard walls are covered with special construction material. The only decorations on the facades are the carved fences on the windows. The foundations are made of brick, without barriers and built on a flat ground. It looks like a continuation of the walls. Their depth is around 0.67-1.0 meters.

== History ==
After conquering Mashhad in 1715, Shergazikhan brought 5,000 soldiers from Iran for the construction of a madrasah. There were architects and masters among them. Due to the subsidence of the soil on the ground where the mausoleum is located, the grave fell two meters down. There are stairs to the grave of Shergazi Khan. As mentioned in the dedication text of this madrasa, historians and poets called this building "Maskan-i Fazilon" ("Abode of Scholars"). The numerical value of the letters of this phrase gave the constructed dateof it. Since then, this name became the second name of the madrasa. A number of famous people of that time studied there such as Turkmen poet Mahtumkuli, Uzbek poet Pahlavanqul Ravnaq, Kazakh Sufi and poet Beket Ota, great Karakalpak poet Ajinyoz.

Today, exhibitions of Mahtumquli and Ajiniyaz are organized in the madrasa.

The building was built in a way that was common at that time: Madrasah with two floors (two floors at the entrance), four courtyards with porches, a set of vestibule rooms, and a series of rooms running diagonally across the entrance. This style of construction can be seen in the Kutlugmurad Inak Madrasah (1809). In addition, this style of construction was used in the construction of Olloqulixon Madrasa (1835), Muhammad Rahimkhan Madrasah(1876) and Amir madrasas (1870).
