= Ak Mosque =

Mosque in Khiva, Uzbekistan

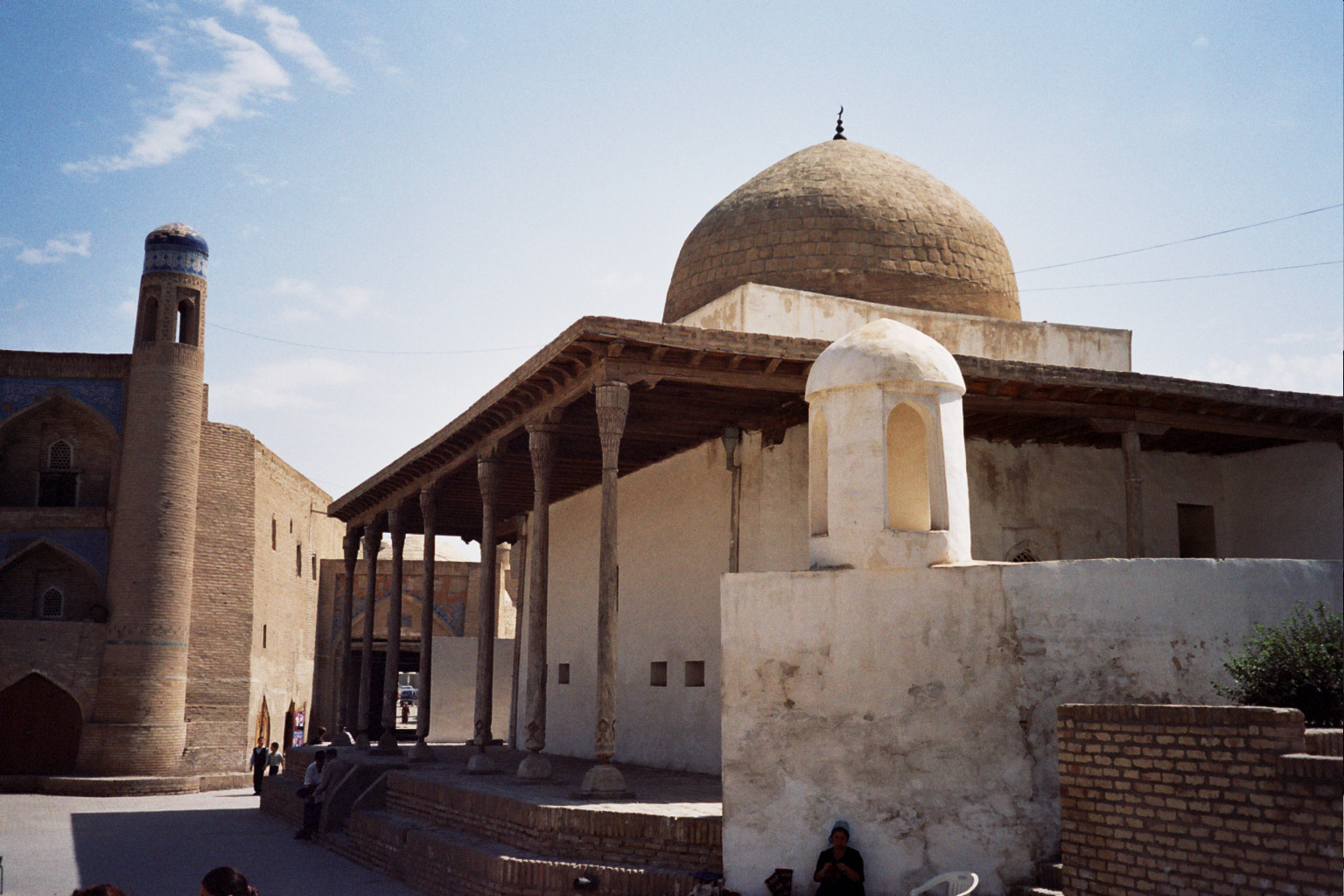

Location
- Location: Khiva
- Country: Uzbekistan
- Interactive map of Ak Mosque
- Coordinates: 41.3773°N 60.3615°E

Architecture
- Established: 1838–1842

Ak Mosque (Uzbek: Oq masjid / Оқ масжид, lit. 'White Mosque') is a 19th century mosque in Khiva, Uzbekistan.

It stands in Itchan Kala, the walled old city of Khiva, which is a World Heritage Site. It was built under the rule of Allah Kuli Bahadur Khan, between 1838 and 1842 on older foundations dating as early as the seventeenth century. It consists of a square, domed room (6.35 x 6.35 m), surrounded on three sides by a portico (iwan). Its total size is 25.5 x 13.5 m.
