= Kutlugmurad Inak Madrasah =

Madrasa in Khiva, Khorazm, Uzbekistan

Kutlugmurad Inak madrasah
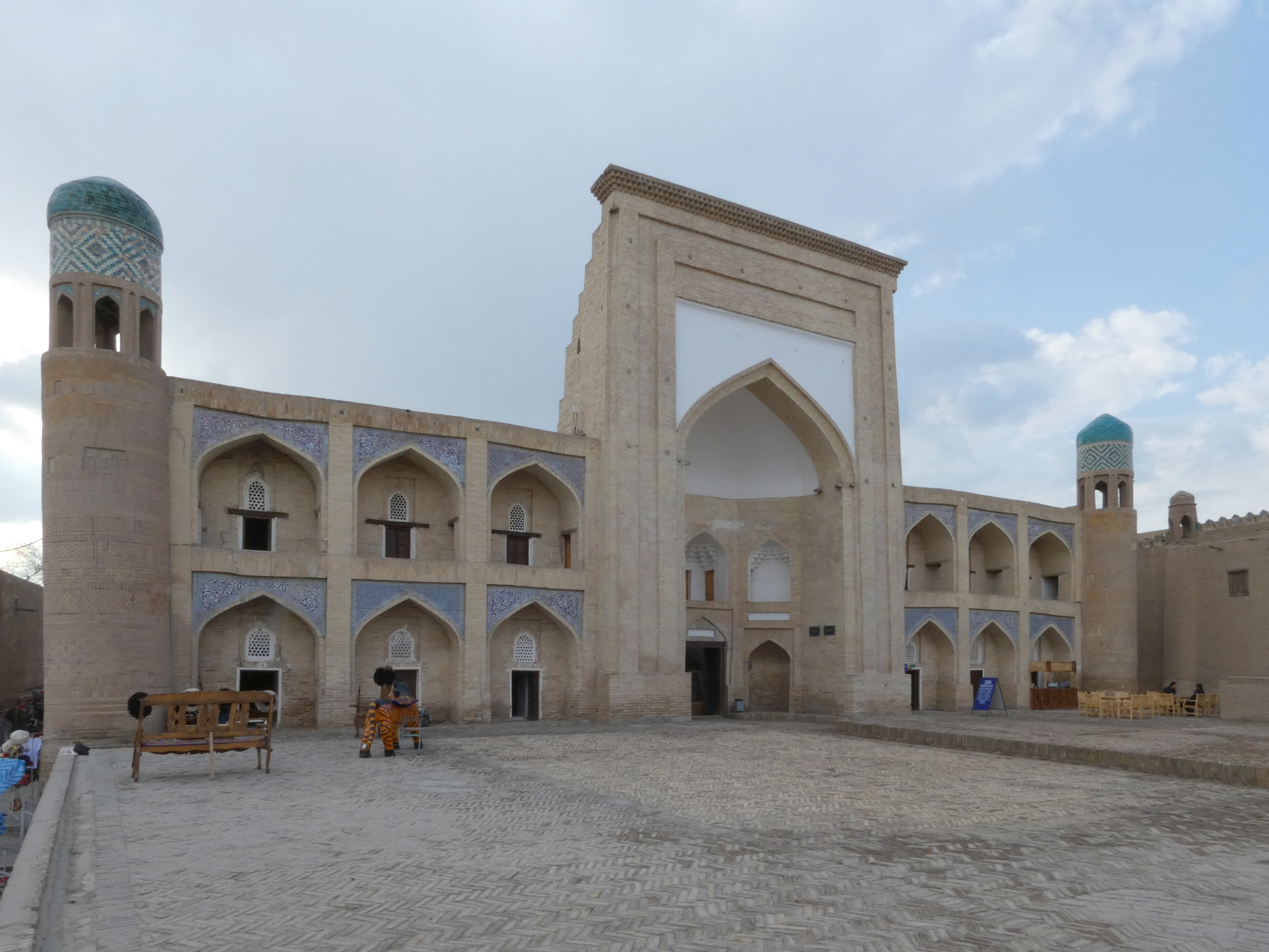
- Interactive map of the Kutlugmurad Inak madrasah area

General information
- Architectural style: Central Asian Architecture
- Location: Khiva, Uzbekistan
- Construction started: 1804
- Completed: 1812
- Owner: Kutlugmurad Inak

Technical details
- Material: baked brick
- Floor count: 2
- Floor area: 57x44 m

Kutlugmurad Inak madrasah - an architectural monument in Khiva (1804–1812); it is a part of Itchan Kala. Madrasah was built by Allah Kuli Khan's uncle Kutlugmurad Inak; he was buried under the floor of the miyonsaroy (corridor) according to his will.

== Description ==
In 1858, 95 students studied at this madrasah. They were taught by 2 akhunds (teachers). In addition, there were positions of mutavwalli (head of the madrasa), imam, muezzin (caller of prayer), janitor who swept it, and barber who cut the hair and beard of the students. There was a large square in front of the madrasah, and there were stalls and a small market nearby. Students who graduated from the madrasa passed the exam. A "special commission" was formed by the Khan for the exam. The commission included sometimes the khan himself, in most cases the crown prince, qazi-kalan of Khiva (chief judge), Qazi-orda (city judge) and several other scholars. Students who passed the exam were given titles such as mufti, a'lam, akhund, muqarrar (madrasa librarian). Poets, historians, calligraphers, scholars and intellectuals grew up among the students who graduated from this madrasa.

Karakalpak poet Berdakh and poet Avaz Otar studied in this madrasa. Currently, an exhibition of products made by artisans are organized in the courtyard of the madrasa.

== Architecture ==
The madrasa has a rectangular layout (57x44 m), a mosque and a classroom (5x5 m layout), rooms (3x3 m), a courtyard (31.8x27.8 m) and a cistern between the courtyard (diameter 7.15 m). Kutlugmurad Inak madrasah is the first 2-story madrasa built in Khiva. It has 2 floors, 3 open arches, and the main style is open and majestic, which is not typical of Khiva madrasahs. The building is made of brick and clay, and the foundation is separated from the wall by wooden beams (the cistern is marble). The pediment in the style of a head and there are 3 arches in both sides of it, the corners are decorated with bouquets-like patterns; enter the mionsaray is through the gate. Mionsaray has 3 rooms, there are a madrasah and a classroom in 2 sides of it; the dome of the mosque and the classroom is connected to shield-shaped arches, the summer mosque is covered with a low dome, and the rooms are covered with a vaulted dome; the dome of the cistern is placed on a cylindrical plinth, and a circular passage (height 1.65 m, width 0.6 m) with an arch is made on the plinth.

Kutlugmurad Inak madrasah is the only monument in Khiva that uses embossed decorations created by the printing method; the facade and mionsaray is decorated with colored carved ganch, the arches are filled with muqarnas; the windows are decorated with decorated fences; carved doors are a rare example of applied art (the dates of the building are written between the patterns). An underground reservoir was built in the courtyard of the madrasa, from which the entire population of Itchan Kala received drinking water. A summer mosque was also built on the territory of the madrasa.

Kutlugmurad Inak requested that after his death he be buried in the madrasah he built. According to the laws of this period, it was forbidden to bring a corpse into the city from outside the city. To bury Kutlugmurad Inak, the fortress wall was demolished in front of the madrasah. As a result, the road leading to the madrasah was opened, the corpse was brought through this road and buried under the gates of the madrasa. The castle wall was repaired again. According to some assumptions, the deceased may have been buried in the cave on the left side of the square in front of the madrasah.
