= Khivan slave trade =

Central Asian trade (17th century – 1873)

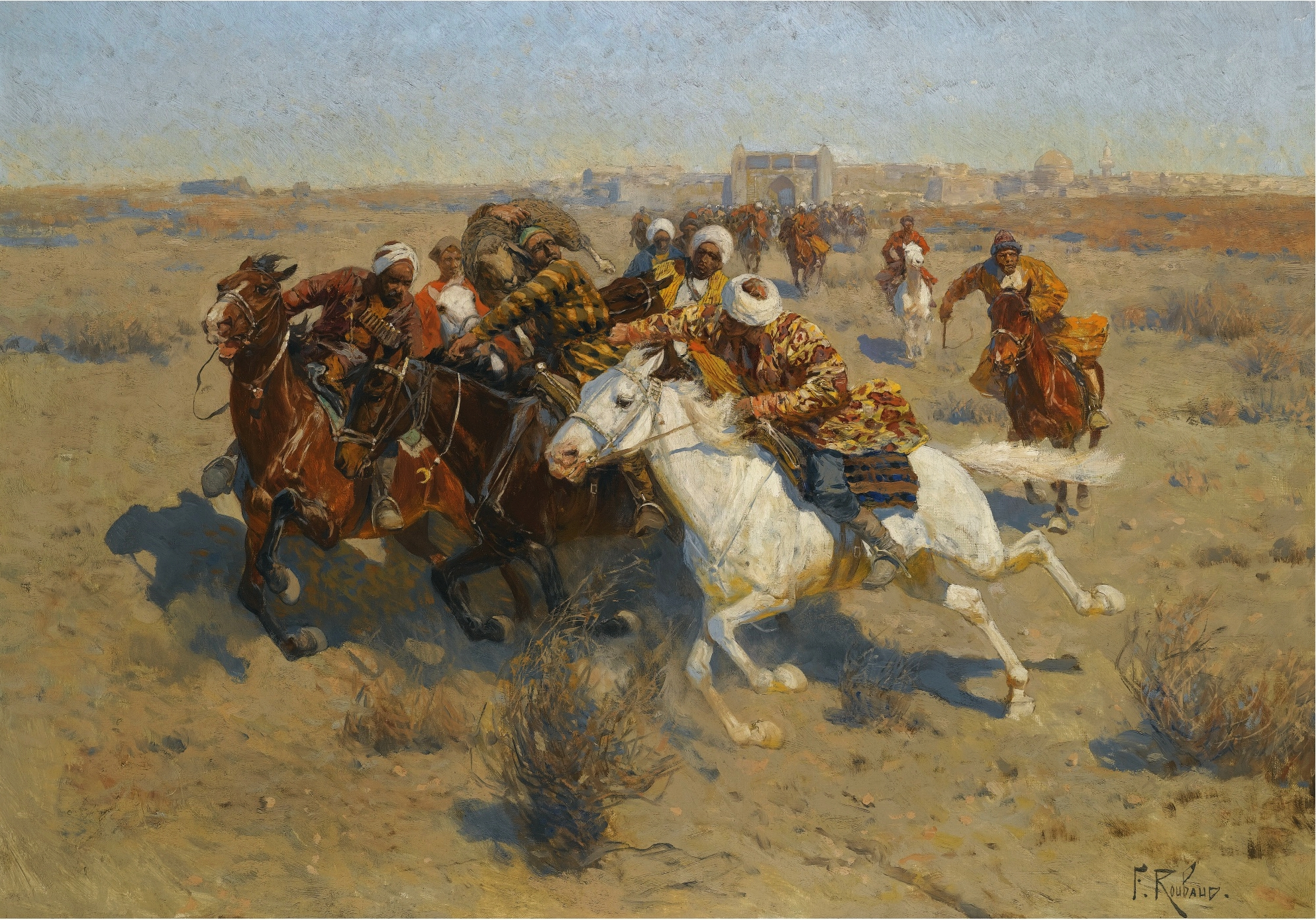
Riders in Khiva. The slaves of the Khivan slave trade were captured in slave raids on the steppe.

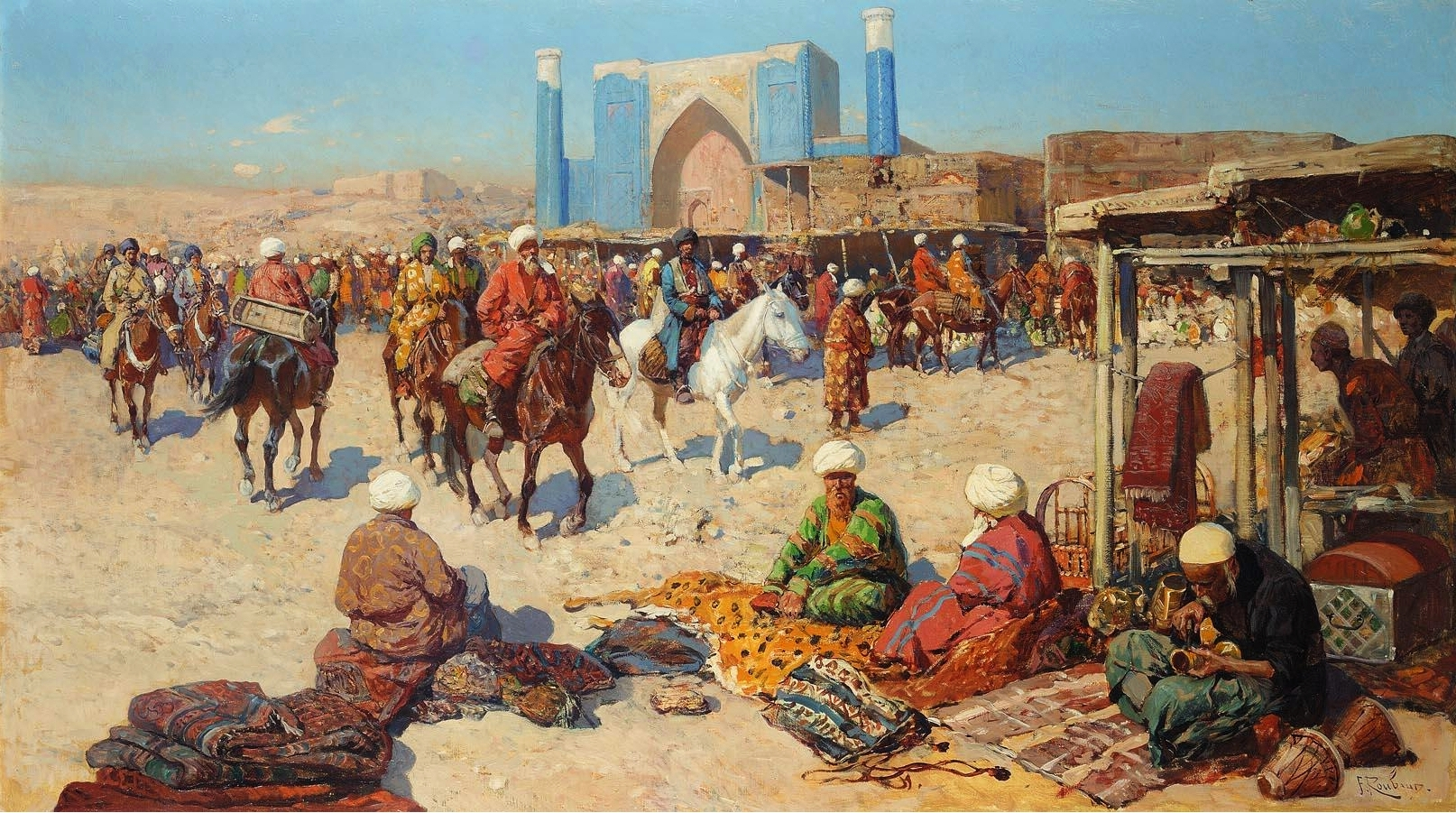
Market in Khiva

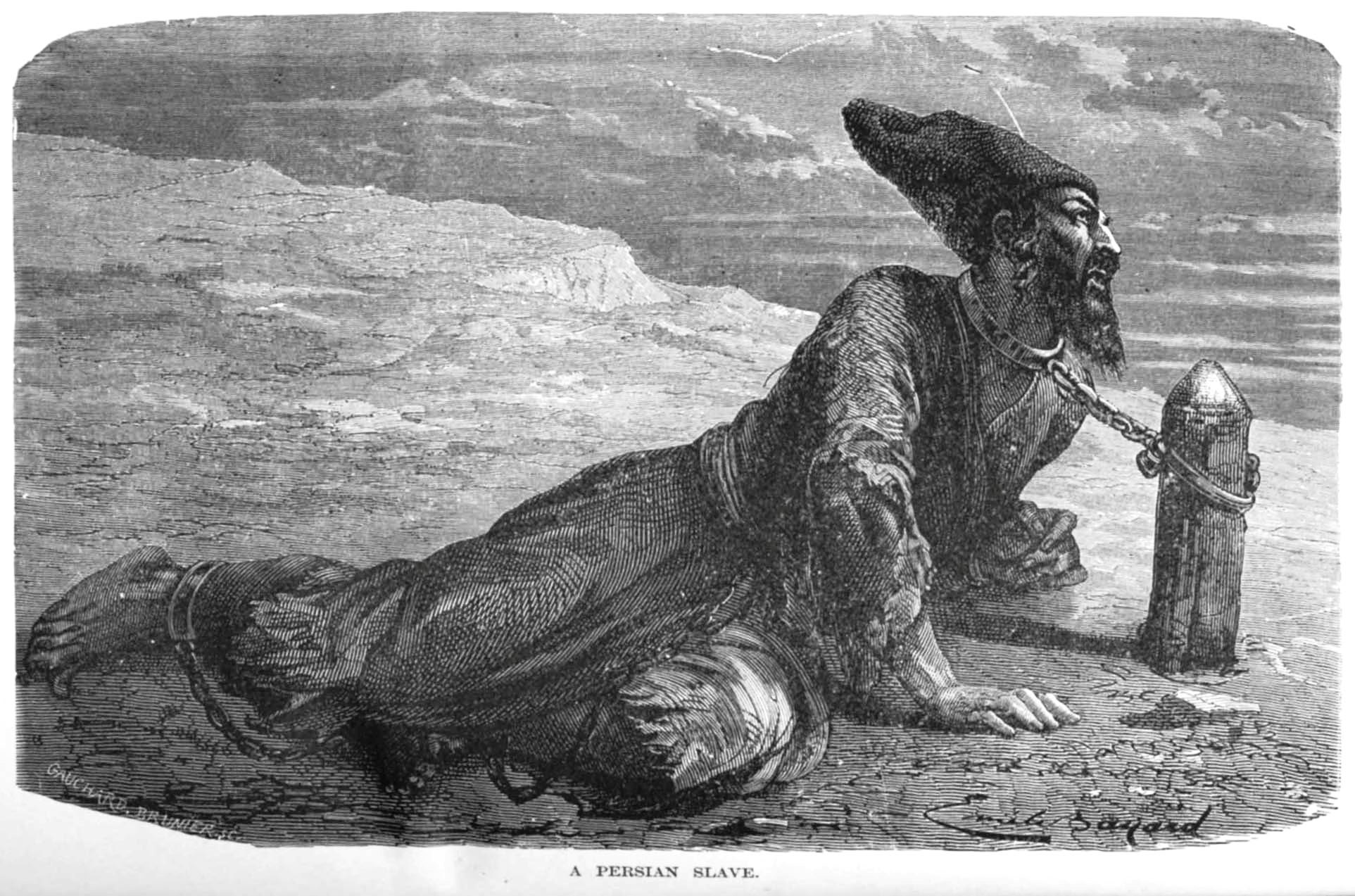
Persian slave in the Khanate of Khiva, 16th century. Painting made in the 19th century

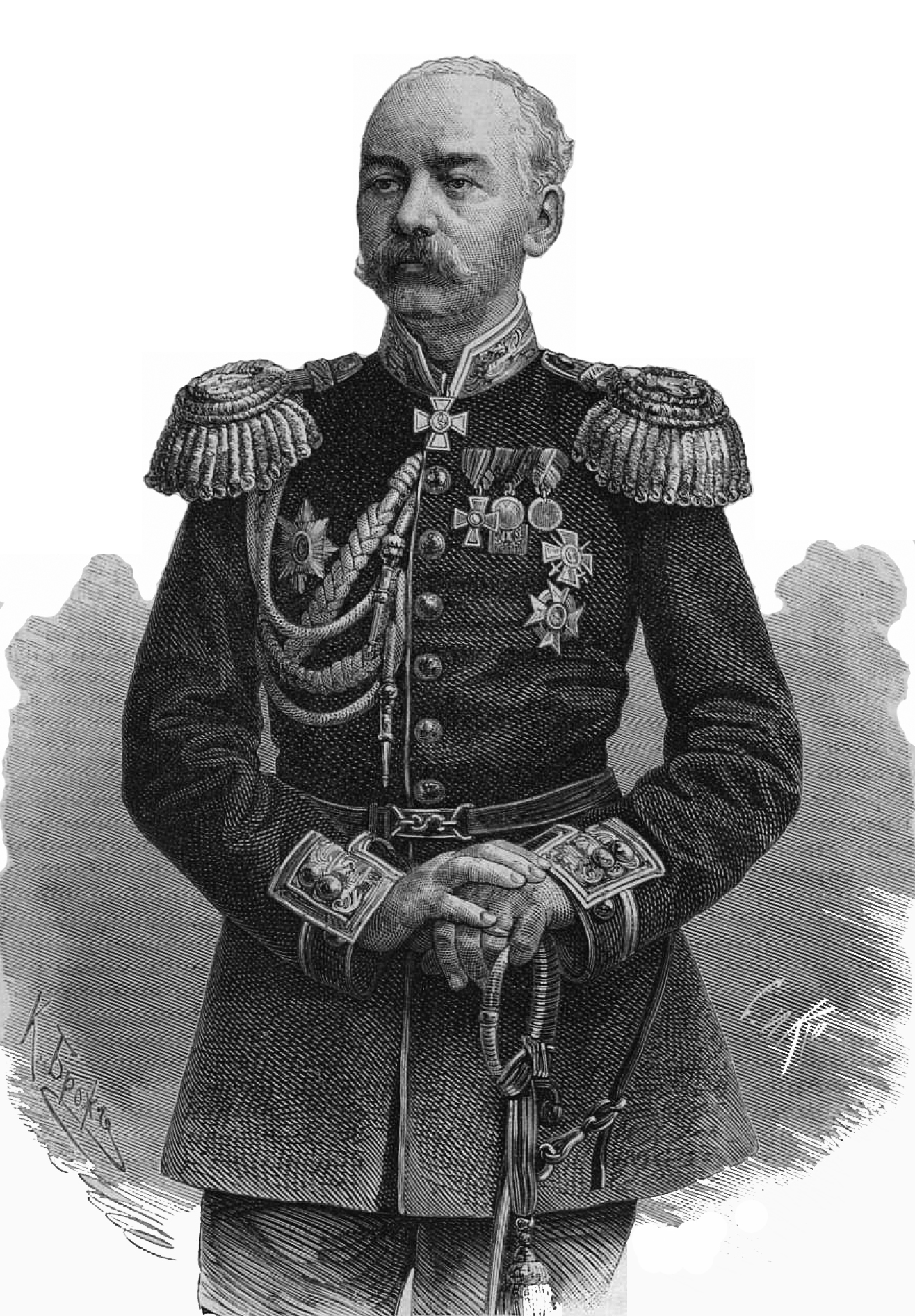
Von Kaufman portrait

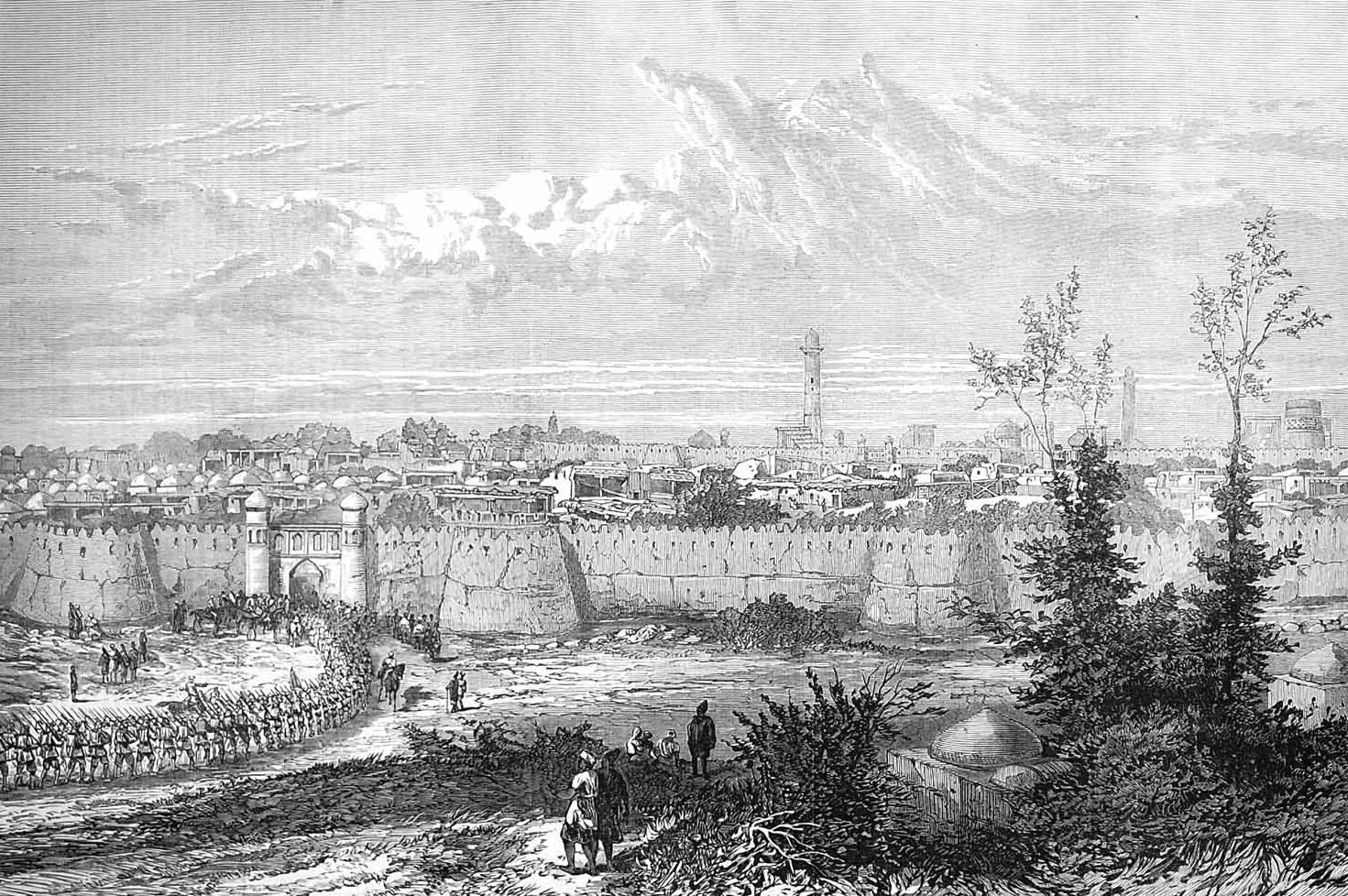
Russians entering Khiva 1873 (cropped)

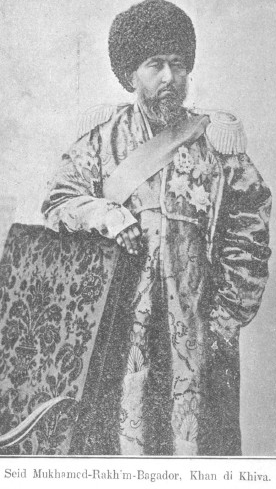
Muhammad Rahim Bahadur II, Khan of Khiva from 1863-1910

The Khanate of Khiva was a major center of slave trade in Central Asia from the 17th century until the Russian conquest in 1873. The slave market in Khiva mainly trafficked slaves from Russia and Persia to the Islamic khanates in Central Asia, but also to India and the Middle East.

Khiva was one of the main slave markets in Central Asia. In Bukhara, Samarkand, Khiva, Karakul, Karshi, and Charju, slaves from northern Central Asia, Eastern Europe, and northeastern Iran were traded. From the 17th to 19th centuries, Khiva was a notorious slave market for captured Persian and Russian slaves.

== Slave trade ==
The slave trade in Khiva and Bukhara was described by the English traveler Anthony Jenkinson in the 16th century, at a time when they were major global slave trade centers and the "slave capitals of the world". About 100,000 slaves were sold in the slave market of Khiva and Bukhara every year, most of them either Persians or Russians.

The slave market in the Khanate of Khiva was supplied with slaves from Russia, Persia, northern Central Asia and Siberia by slave raids performed by the Kazakh Khanate against Tsarist Russia and the Turkmens against Qajar Persia.

In the 19th century, the Khivan slave trade became bigger than the Bukhara slave trade, but both maintained many similarities. Turkmen tribal groups performed regular slave raids, referred to as alaman, toward two sources of slaves; Russian and German settlers along the Ural, and Persian pilgrims to Mashad, two categories who as Christians and Shia-Muslims respectively were seen as religiously legitimate to target for enslavement.

=== Bashkir ===
In 1755, Nepliuev tried to enlist Kazakh support by ending the reprisal raids and promising that the Kazakhs could keep the Bashkir women and children living among them (a long-standing point of contention between Nepliuev and Khan Nurali of the Junior Jüz). Thousands of Bashkirs would be massacred or taken captive by Kazakhs over the course of the uprising, whether in an effort to demonstrate loyalty to the Tsarist state, or as a purely opportunistic maneuver.

In 1736, urged on by Kirilov, the Kazakhs of the Lesser and Middle Hordes launched raids into Bashkir lands, killing or capturing many Bashkirs in the Siberian and Nogay districts.

=== Kazakh ===
Persians, Kurds, and Arabs bought Kazakh slaves who were falsely masqueraded as Kalmyks by slave dealers from Khiva and Bukhara.

=== Persia ===
A major source for slaves to the Khiva and Bukhara slave trade were Persians; while Islam banned Muslims from enslaving other Muslims, the Persians were Shia Muslims while Khiva and Bukhara were Sunni Muslims, and were therefore seen as legitimate targets for slavery.

Turkmen tribal groups performed slave raids against caravans and travelers in the border zone along the frontiers between Shia Muslim Persia and Sunni Muslim Central Asia – also a religious border zone – and a particularly popular zone for Turkmen slave raids were the Shia Muslim Persian pilgrim road to Mashhad.

=== Russia ===
During the early modern era (16th century–18th century), Khiva and Bukhara imported large numbers of Europeans slaves kidnapped by the Crimean Tatars (normally Russians).

The Crimean slave trade was eradicated in the late 18th century. However Russian captives were still provided via the Kazakh Khanate slave trade during the Kazakh raids into Russia. During the 18th century, raids by Kazakhs on Russia's territory of Orenburg were common; the Kazakhs captured many Russians and sold them as slaves in the Central Asian market. The Volga Germans were also victims of Kazakh raids; they were ethnic Germans living along the River Volga in the region of southeastern European Russia around Saratov. In 1717, 3,000 Russian slaves consisting of men, women, and children were sold in Khiva by Kazakh and Khivan tribesmen.

In 1722, they stole cattle, robbed from Russian villages and people trapped in captivity and sold in the slave markets of Central Asia (in 1722 in Bukhara were over 5,000 Russian prisoners). In the middle of the 17th century, 500 Russians were annually sold to Khiva by Kazakhs. In 1730, the Kazakhs' frequent raids into Russian lands were a constant irritant and resulted in the enslavement of many of the Tsar's subjects, who were sold on to Khiva and Bukhara.

In 1743, an order was given by the senate in response to the failure to defend against the Kazakh attack on a Russian settlement, which resulted in 14 Russians killed, 24 wounded. In addition, 96 Cossacks were captured by Kazakhs.

In the period between 1764 and 1803, according to data collected by the Orenburg Commission, twenty Russian caravans were attacked and plundered. Kazakh raiders attacked even big caravans which were accompanied by numerous guards.

In spring 1774, the Russians demanded the Khan return 256 Russians captured by a recent Kazakh raid. In summer 1774, when Russian troops in the Kazan region were suppressing the rebellion led by the Cossack leader Pugachev, the Kazakhs launched more than 240 raids and captured many Russians and herds along the border of Orenburg. In 1799, the biggest Russian caravan which was plundered at that time lost goods worth 295,000 rubles.

By 1830, the Russian government estimated that two hundred Russians were kidnapped and sold into slavery in Khiva every year.

== Slave market ==
The slave trade in Khiva and Bukhara was described by the English traveler Anthony Jenkinson in the 16th century, at a time when they were major global slave trade centers and the "slave capitals of the world". About 100,000 slaves were sold in the slave market of Khiva and Bukhara every year, most of them either Persians or Russians.

During the first half of the 19th century alone, some one million Persians, as well as an unknown number of Russians, were enslaved and transported to Central Asian khanates.

In the 19th century, the slave markets of Khiva and Bukhara were still among the biggest slave markets in the world. The Turkmens were so known for their slave raids that it was said that Turkmens "would not hesitate to sell into slavery the Prophet himself, did he fall into their hands". The constant raids against travelers constituted a problem for traveling in the region.

When Russian troops took Khiva in 1873 there were 29,300 Persian slaves, captured by Turkmen raiders. According to Josef Wolff (Report of 1843–1845) the population of the Khanate of Bukhara was 1,200,000, of whom 200,000 were Persian slaves.

Slaves were exported to the rest of the free Muslim states in Central Asia. There were however also a domestic slave market in the Khanate of Khiva. Male slaves were used for hard labor. The royal Tash Khauli Palace were constructed between 1830 and 1838 on the order of Allah Kuli Khan by about 1,000 slave laborers, and its first enslaved architect was reportedly impaled for his estimation that it would not be possible to construct the palace as fast as the monarch wished. Female slaves were used for domestic servitude or for sexual slavery as concubines.

=== Royal harem ===
The royal harem of the ruler of the Khanate of Khiva (1511–1920) in Central Asia (Uzbekistan) was composed of both legal wives and slave concubines. The khan had four legal wives, who were obliged to be free Muslim women. Aside from his legal wives, enslaved women were acquired from slave markets and were obliged to be non-Muslims since free Muslim women could not be slaves. The enslaved girls were initially given as servants to the khan's mother. She provided them with an education to make them suitable for concubinage, after which some of them were selected to be the concubines to the khan. The slave girls were purchased to the harem at about the age of twelve, and stayed there until about the age of thirty. Only the khan's legal wives were allowed to give birth to his children, and the slave concubines who conceived were given forced abortions.

The women could be sold off if they did not please the khan, or given in marriage to his favored subjects. The son of the khan was not allowed to inherit his father's concubine, so when a khan died, his concubines were sold at the slave market. Men were normally not allowed to visit the harem, but Jewish tradeswomen were allowed in to sell their wares, such as clothes, to the harem inhabitants.

== The end of the slave trade ==
The Khivan slave trade was used by the Russian Empire as a pretext of the Russian annexation in 1873.

The conquest of Khiva was part of the Russian conquest of Turkestan. British attempts to deal with this were called the Great Game. One of the reasons for the 1839 attack was the increasing number of Russian slaves held at Khiva. To remove this pretext Britain launched its own effort to free the slaves. Major Todd, the senior British political officer stationed in Herat (in Afghanistan) dispatched Captain James Abbott, disguised as an Afghan, on 24 December 1839, for Khiva.

Abbott arrived in late January 1840 and, although the Khan was suspicious of his identity, he succeeded in talking the Khan into allowing him to carry a letter for the Tsar regarding the slaves. He left on 7 March 1840, for Fort Alexandrovsk, and was subsequently betrayed by his guide, robbed, then released when the bandits realized the origin and destination of his letter. His superiors in Herat, not knowing of his fate, sent another officer, Lieutenant Richmond Shakespear, after him. Shakespear had more success than Abbott: he convinced the khan to free all Russian subjects under his control, and also to make the ownership of Russian slaves a crime punishable by death. The freed slaves and Shakespear arrived in Fort Alexandrovsk on 15 August 1840, and Russia lost its primary motive for the conquest of Khiva, for the time being. The slave trade, however, continued.

=== The Khivan slave uprising and abolition ===
In 1873, Khiva was annexed by Russia after the Russian conquest of Khiva during the Russian conquest of Central Asia. This event resulted in the abolition of the slave trade and slavery in Khiva.

When the Russian general Konstantin Petrovich von Kaufmann and his army approached the city of Khiva during the Khivan campaign of 1873, the Khan Muhammad Rahim Khan II of Khiva fled to hide among the Yomuts, and the slaves in Khiva rebelled, informed about the imminent downfall of the city. When Kaufmann's Russian army entered Khiva on 28 March, he was approached by Khivans who begged him to put down the ongoing slave uprising, during which slaves avenged themselves on their former slavers.

When the Khan returned to his capital after the Russian conquest, the Russian General Kaufmann presented him with a demand to abolish the Khivan slave trade and slavery, which he did.

== See also ==
- Slavery in Central Asia
- Crimean slave trade
- Bukhara slave trade
