= Juma Mosque, Khiva =

Mosque in Khiva, Uzbekistan

Juma Mosque
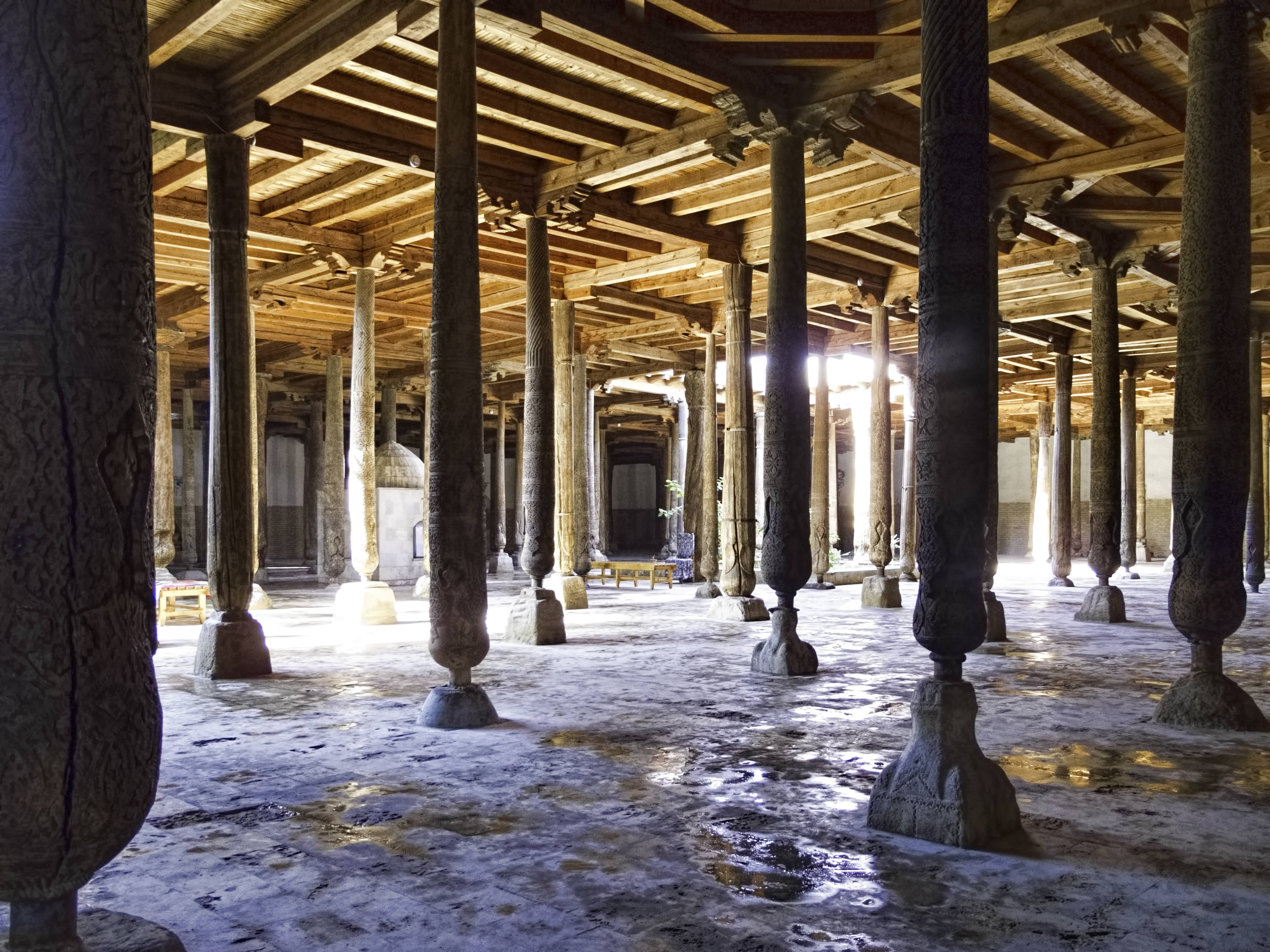

Religion
- Region: Xorazm Region

Location
- Location: Khiva
- Country: Uzbekistan
- Interactive map of Juma Mosque
- Coordinates: 41.3775°N 60.3599°E

Architecture
- Established: 10th–18th century

Juma Mosque (Uzbek: Juma masjid / Жума масжид, lit. 'Friday Mosque') is a 10th–18th century mosque in Khiva, Uzbekistan. It is one of the principal monuments of Itchan Kala, the walled old city of Khiva, which is a World Heritage Site. It stands in the middle of Itchan Kala, on the road connecting the west gate (Ota darvoza) and the east gate (Polvon darvoza). The mosque was first documented in the 10th century, but it was rebuilt in 1788.

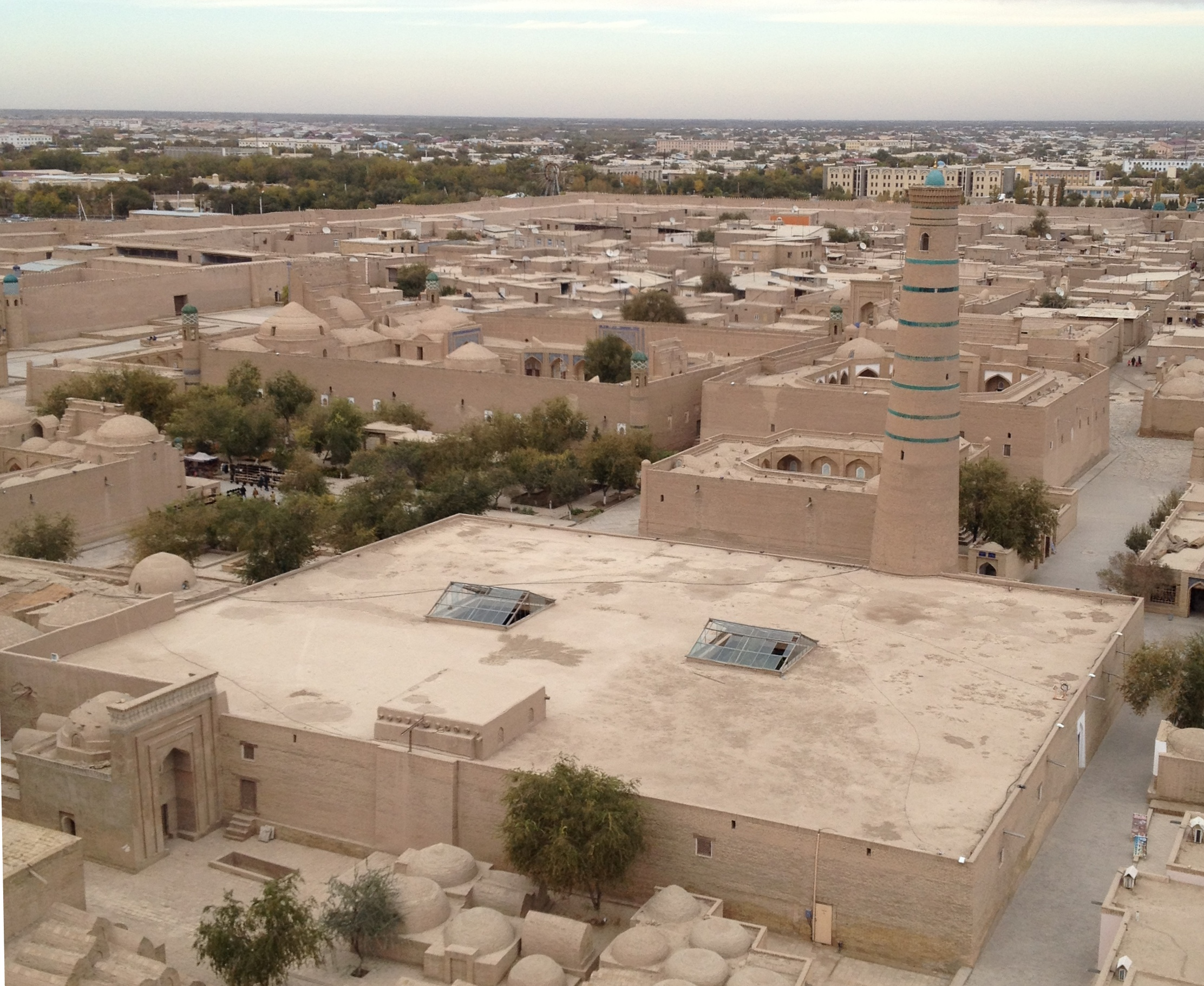
Exterior and minaret

It is a large one-story brick building with a flat roof, supported by 212 wooden columns in 17 rows. Its total size is 55 x 46 m, and its minaret is 42 m high.
