= Toshhovli Palace =

Palace in Khiva, Uzbekistan

Coordinates: 41.3782°N 60.3615°E

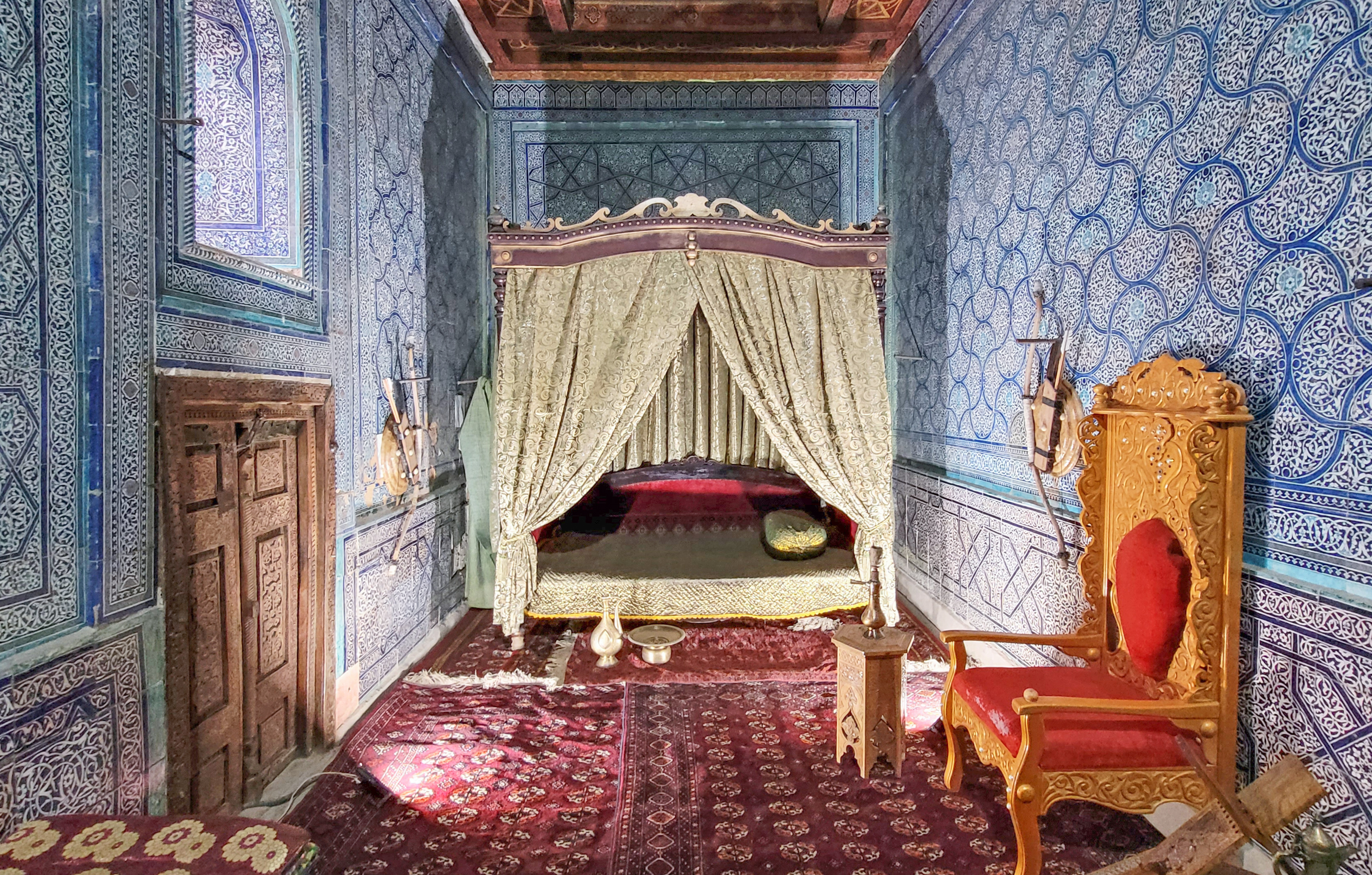
A room in the Tach Khaouli

The Toshhovli Palace or Tach Khaouli Palace, (literally : Stone Palace), is a palace located in Khiva (Uzbekistan) in the fortified district of Itchan Kala, the whole of which has been a UNESCO world heritage site since 1990.

The palace was built from 1830 to 1841 for the ruler of the Khiva Khanate, Allah Kuli Bahadur Khan, and includes more than 260 rooms around three courtyards: that of the Harem in the northern part, that of the Ichrat Khaouli (Audience hall), built in 1830–1832, located in the southeast quarter and finally that of the Arz Khaouli (Court of justice), in the southwest quarter (1837–1838).

== Harem ==
The harem, which was the first part to be built, is arranged around a rectangular courtyard with five lodges each supported by a carved wooden pillar. Four lodges were allocated to the Khan's four legitimate wives and the fifth, the largest, to the Khan himself.

The apartments are all designed according to the same architecture: a high loggia open towards the northwest for the summer and an adjoining room for the winter months. The whole is decorated with blue and white maiolica, the work of Abdullah Djinn. The wooden ceilings are decorated with yellow and red patterns.
The decoration of the whole is essentially characterized by Faience with geometric and floral patterns in blue and white tones. The walls are inlaid with small jade green elements reminiscent of an ancient Zoroastrian symbol.

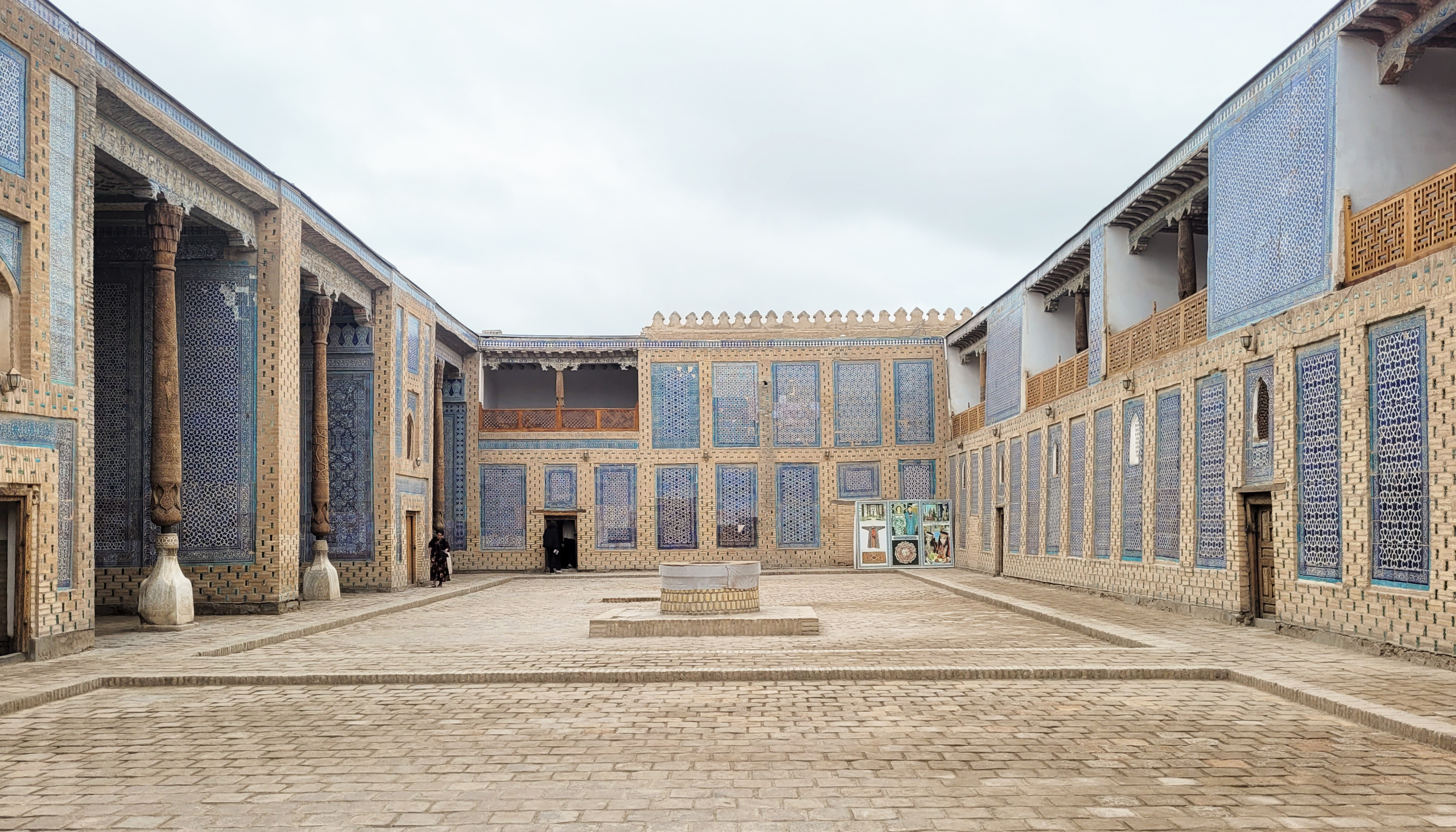
Harem court yard

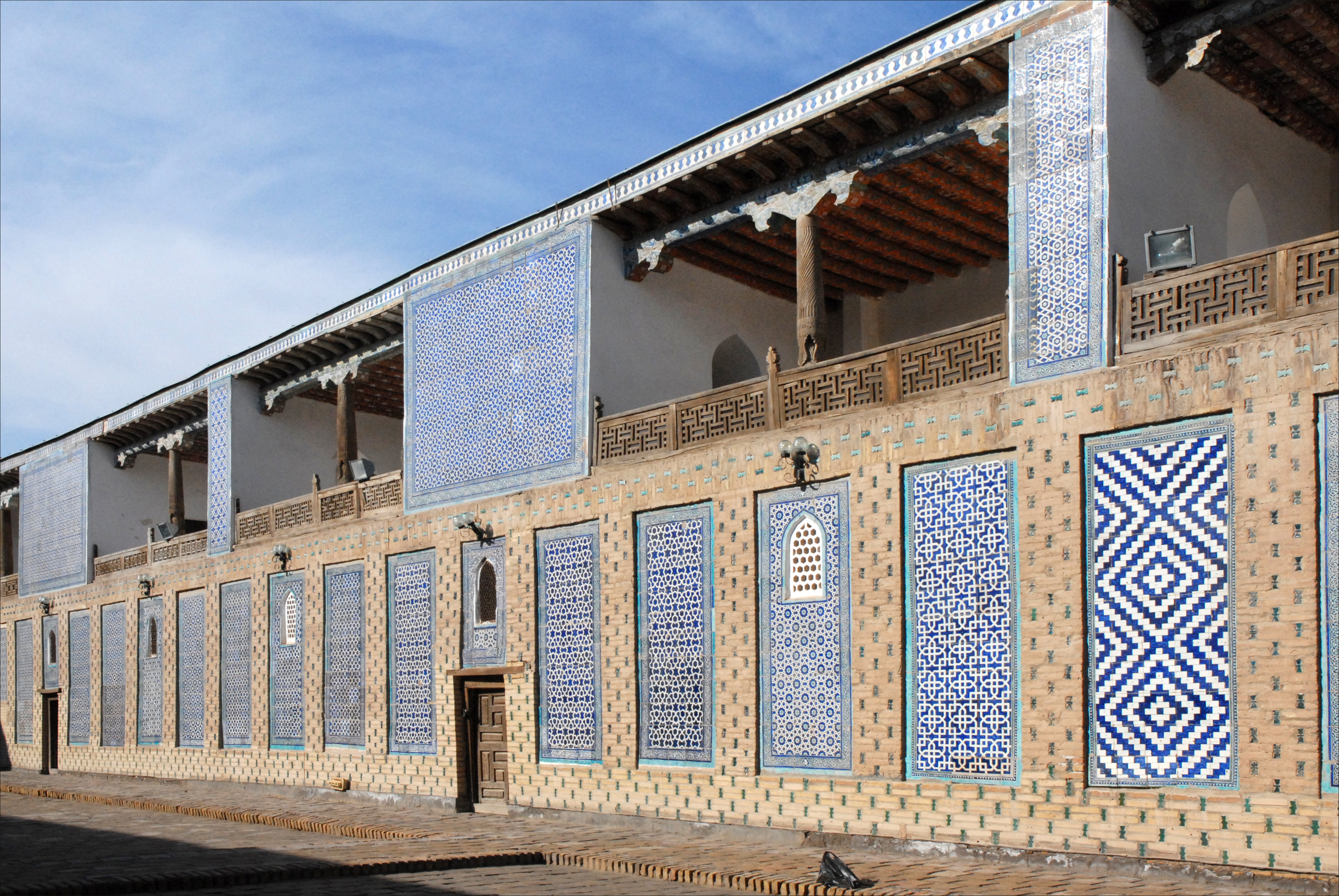
View of the apartments and majolica panels

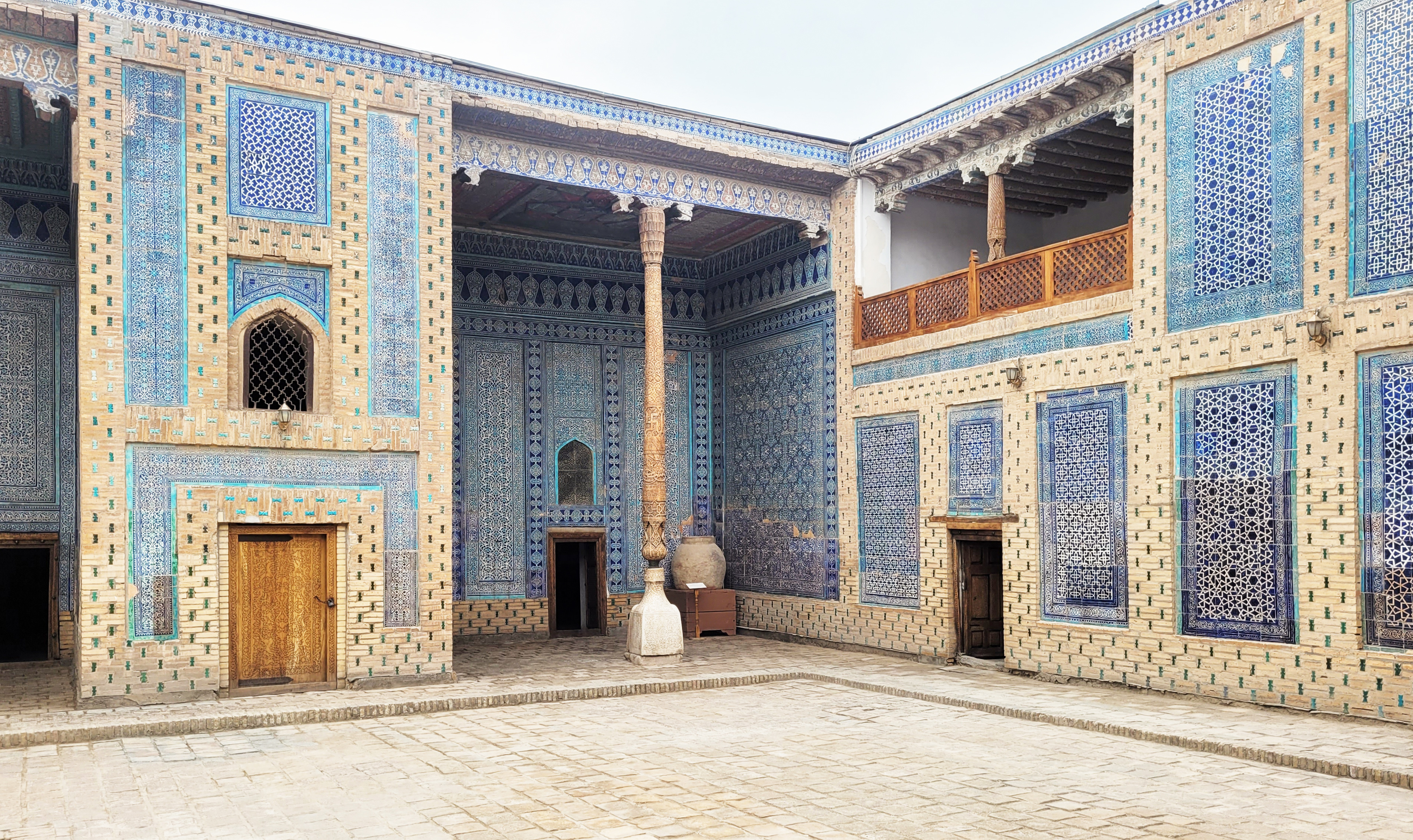
View of the wives' lodges

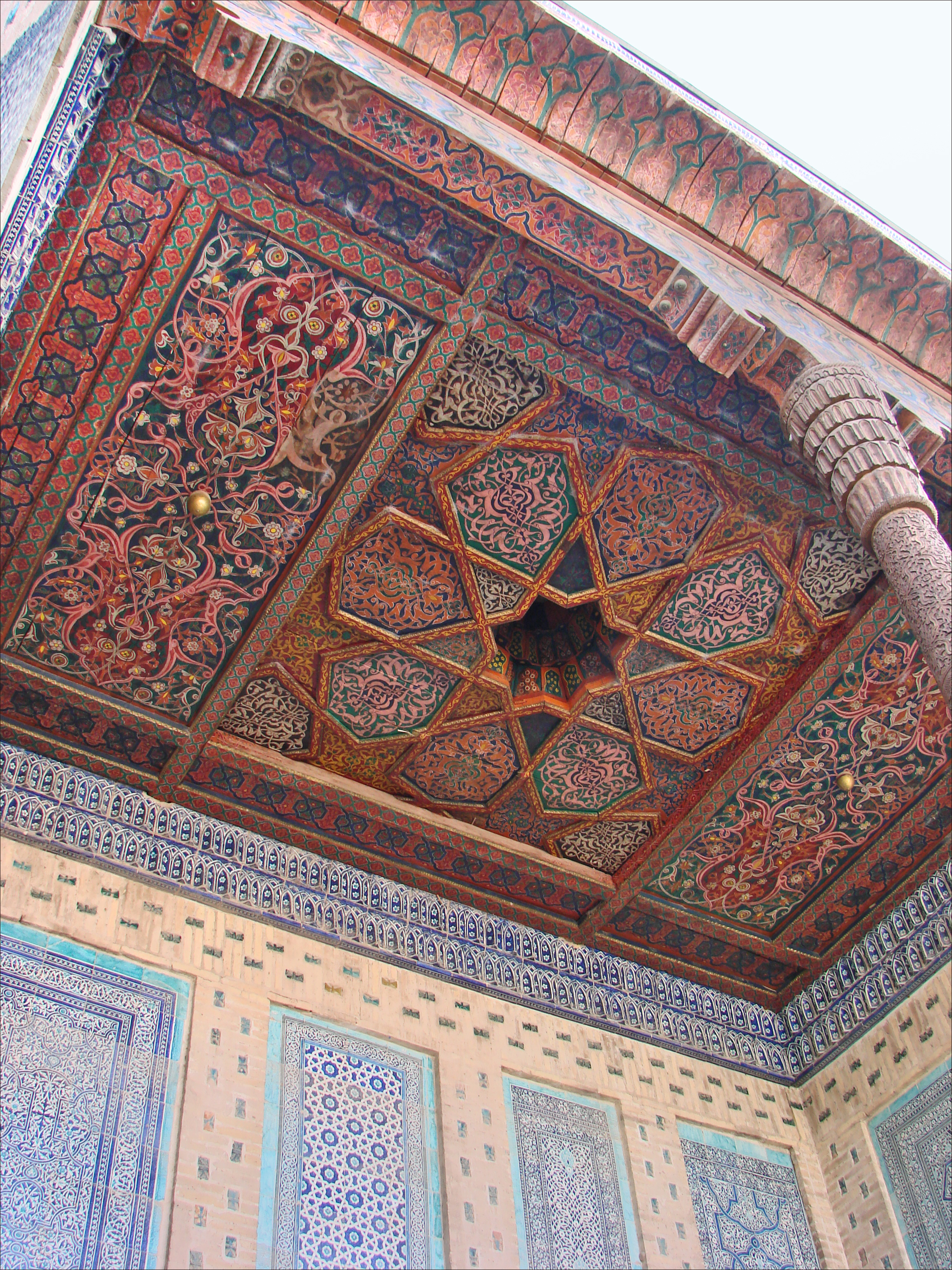
Ceiling of one of the lodges

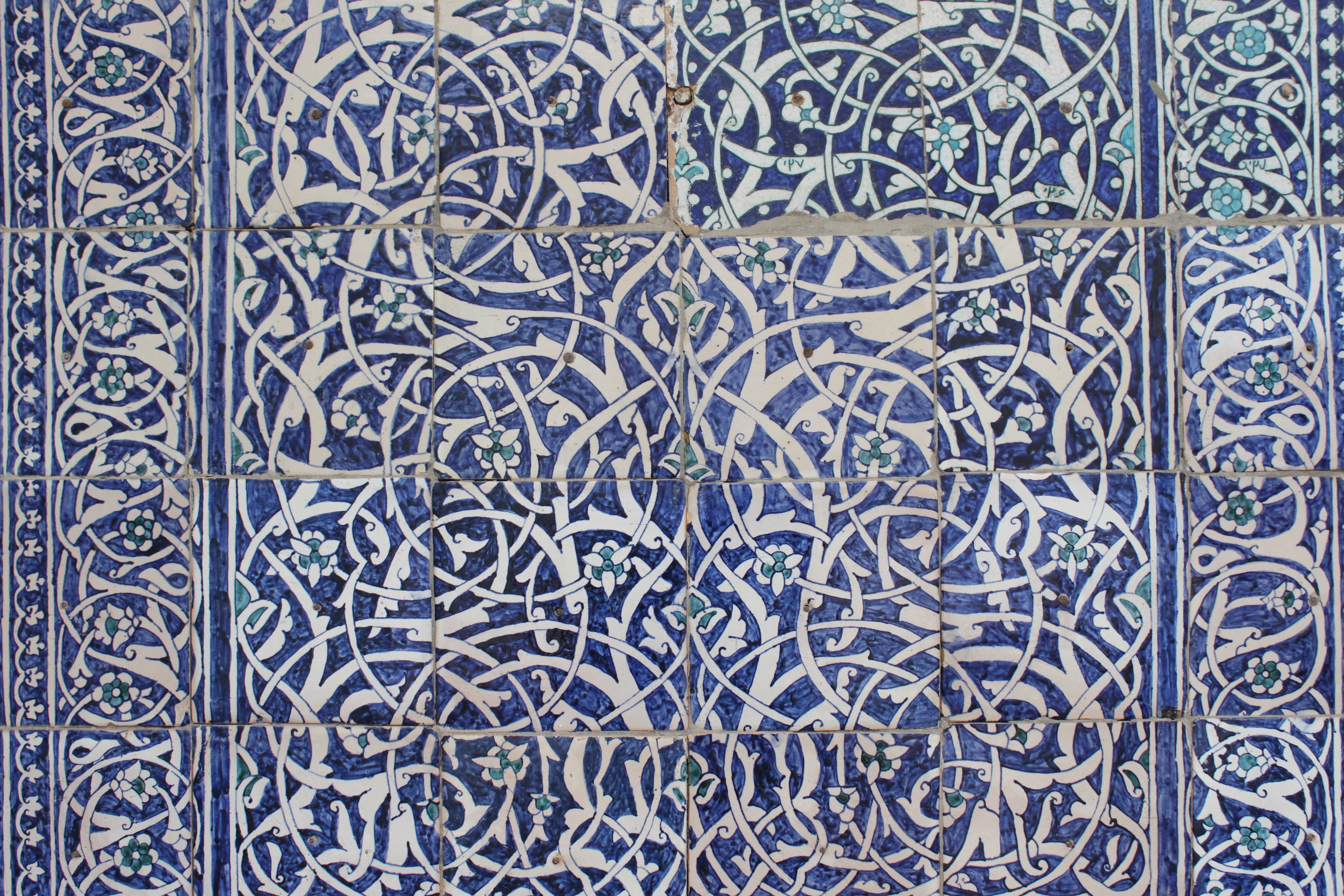
Detail of the ceramic tiles of the harem

== Ichrat Khaouli ==
This part is arranged around a square courtyard with a lodge on the south side, supported by a carved wooden pillar, where the Khan sat to receive his guests in audience, as well as the ambassadors. The ambassadors were housed in the eastern part of the courtyard, where they could deploy their tent, or yurt, on two circular platforms. The whole is decorated with blue maiolica.

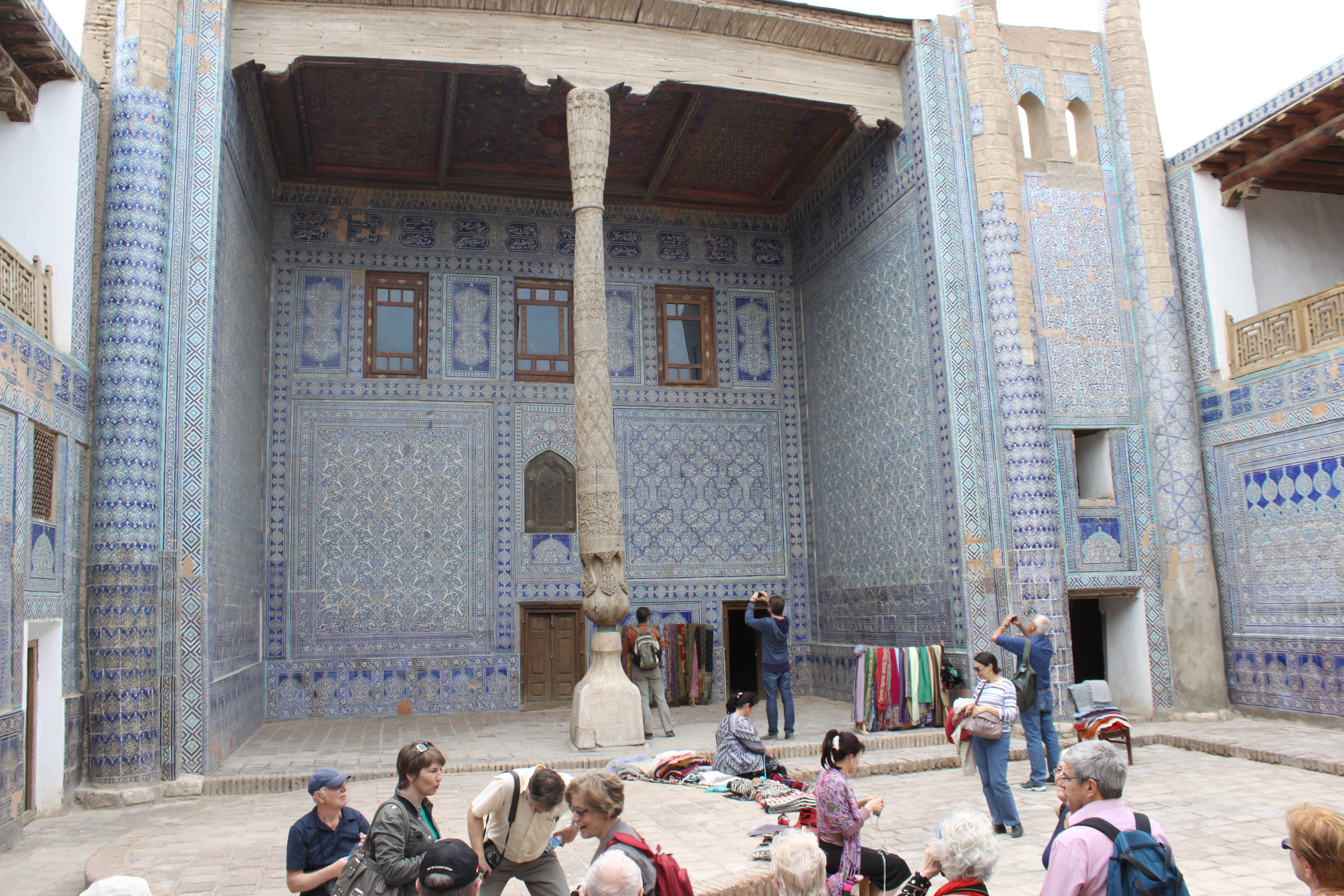
Tach Khaouli reception yard

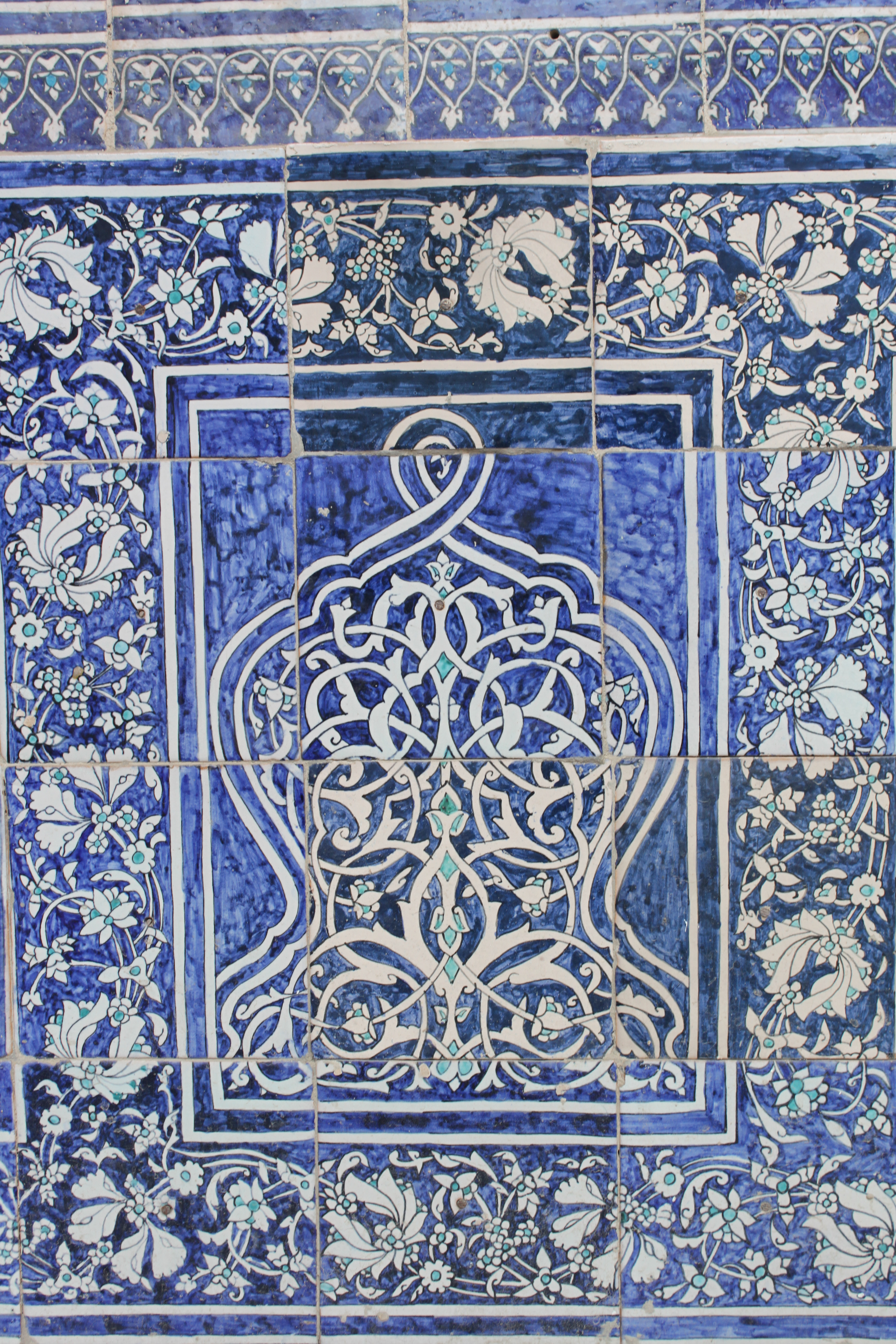
Detail in the reception yard

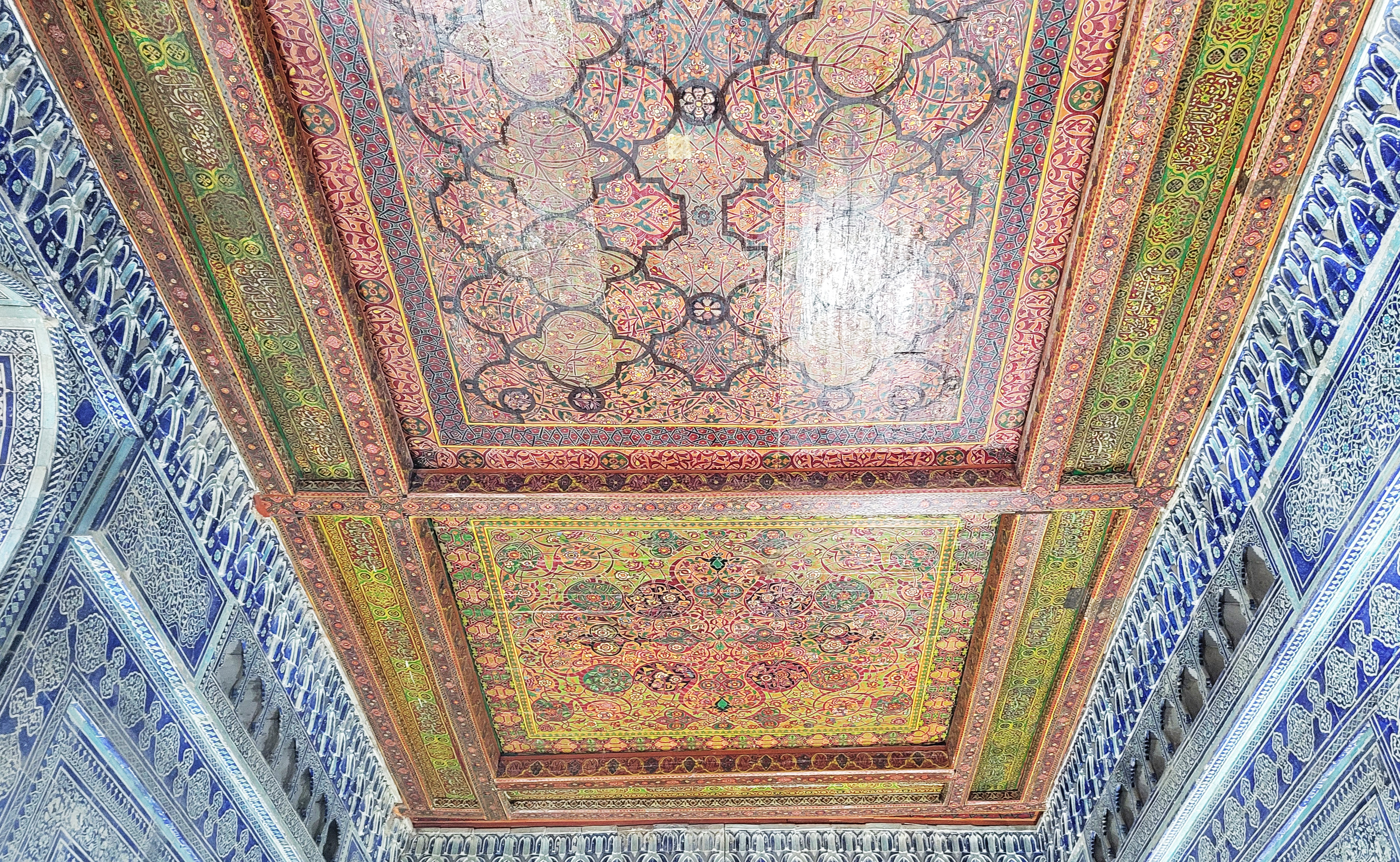
Detail of the ceiling

== Arz Khaouli ==
The Court of Justice, or Arz Khaouli was the place where the Khan mediated disputes and dispensed justice. This part is in the southwest quarter of the palace. It is twice as large as Ichrat Khaouli. The walls are also decorated with Faience coverings. Two side staircases provide access to the raised platform of the Iwan (or loggia) at the bottom of which are three doors. A platform intended to install a yurt is placed in the courtyard, in the extension of the column of the loggia, in perfect symmetry.

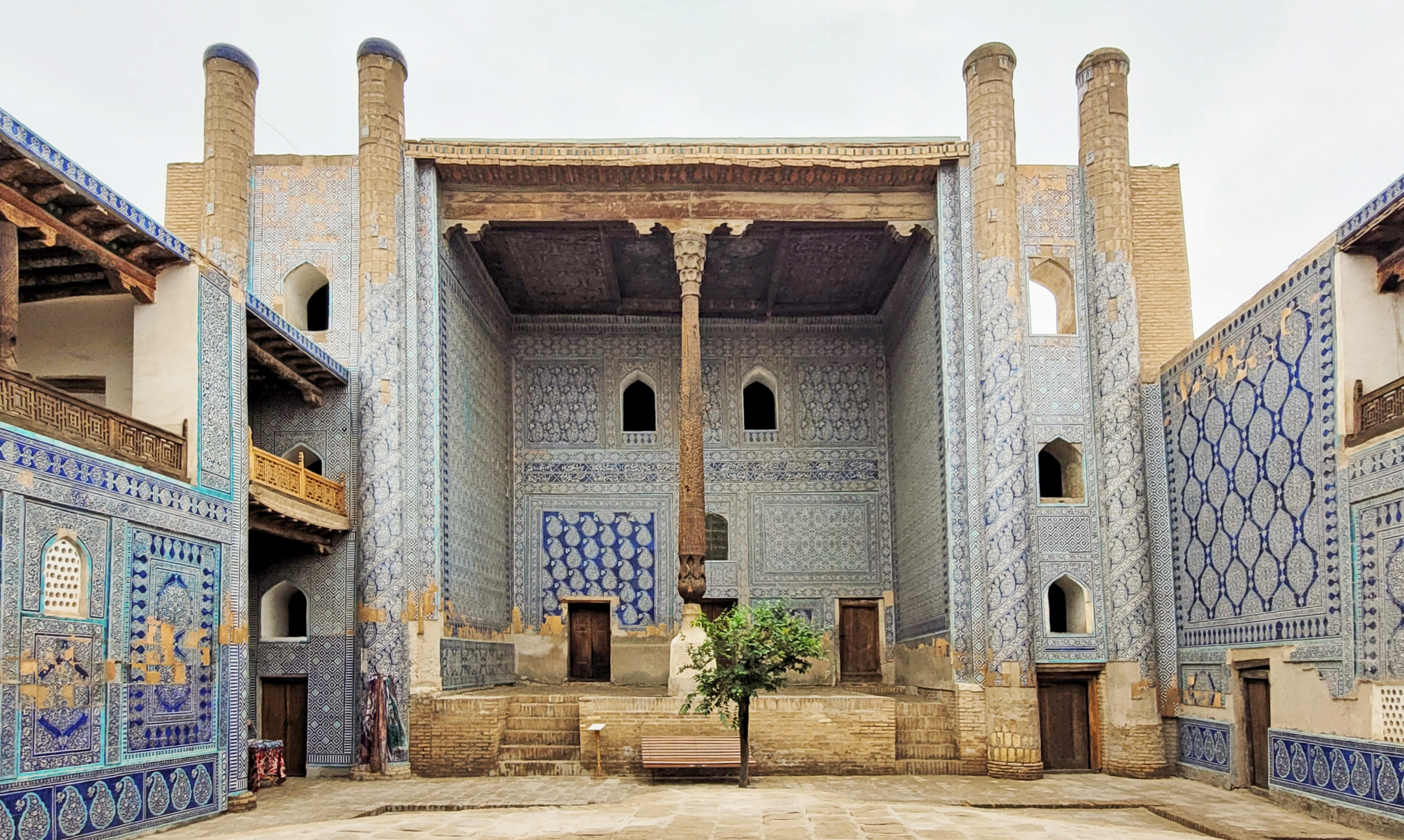
Iwan of the Khan

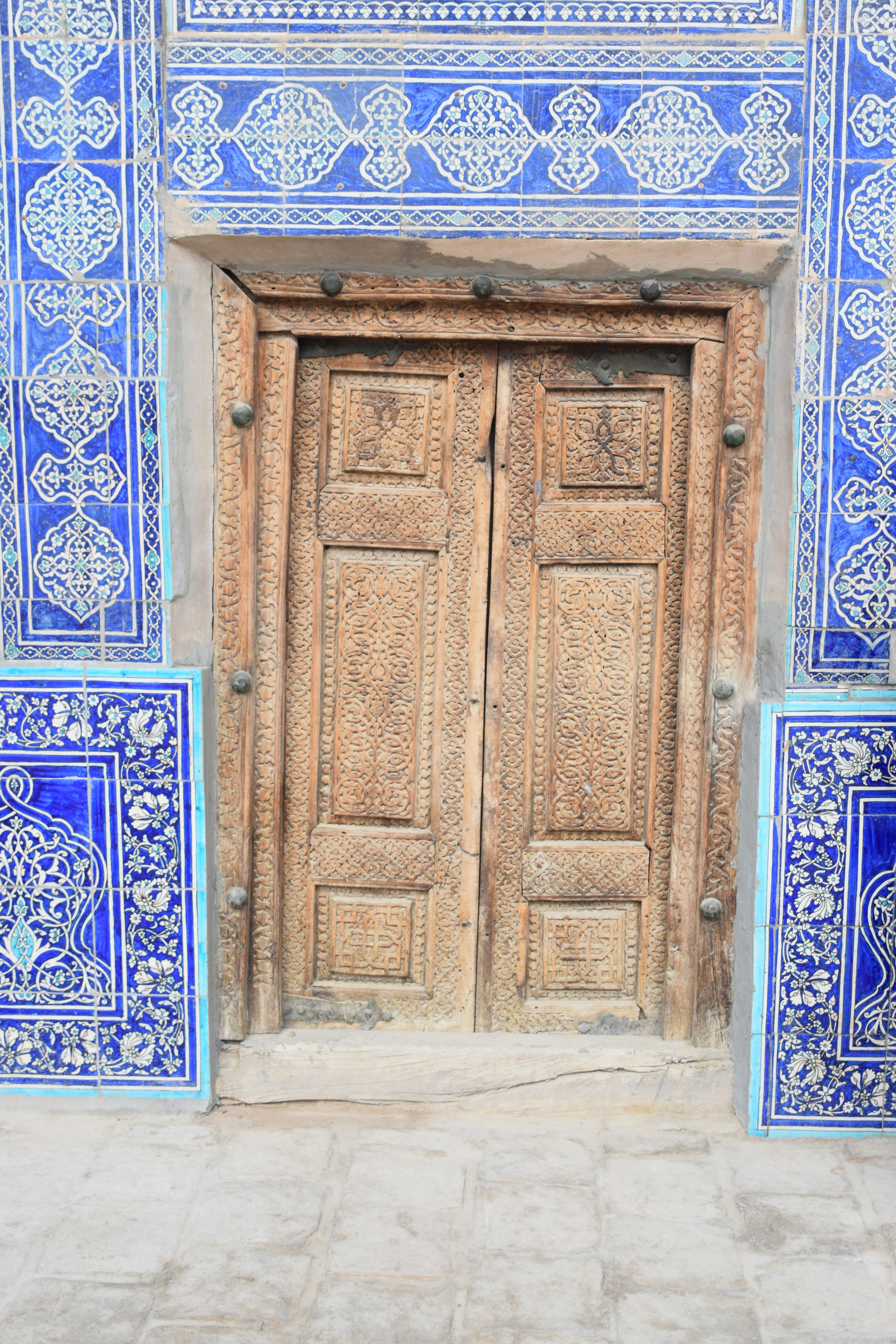
Door in the Court of Justice

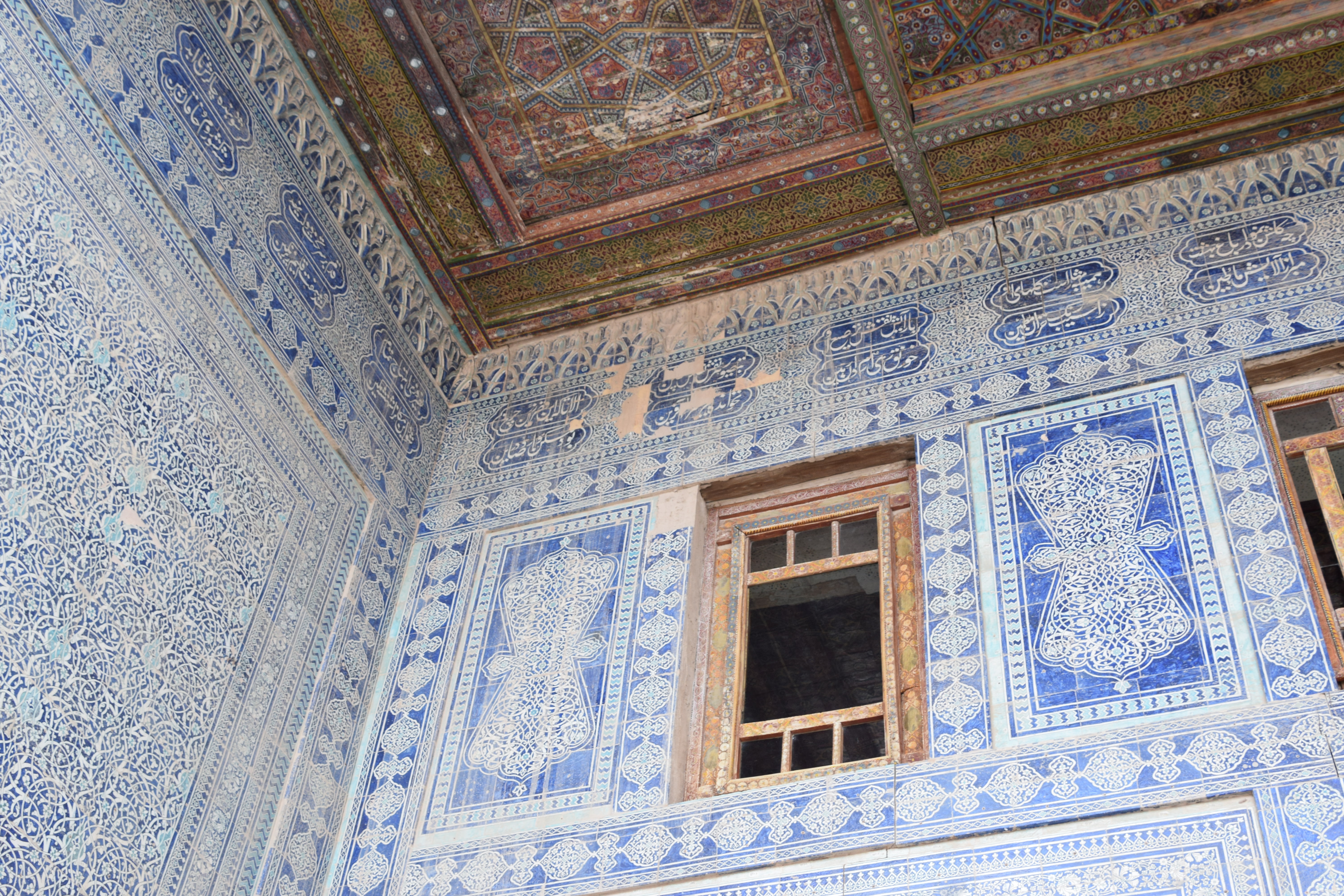
Court of Justice: detail

== History ==
The royal Palace were constructed between 1830 and 1838 on the order of Allah Kuli Khan by about 1,000 slave laborers, and its first enslaved architect were reportedly impaled for his estimation that it would not be possible to construct the palace as fast as the monarch wished.

The architect of the palace, Usta Nur Mohammed Tajikistan, suffered a tragic fate. The Khan ordered him to be impaled for having declared that he was unable to complete the construction of the palace in two years. His successor, Kalandarou Khivaghi, however, took eight years to complete it, but did not have the insolence to say so. The famous ceramist Abdoullah Djinn contributed to the decoration of the palace.

The palace was the khan's residence from 1841 to 1880, when Mohammed Rahim Khan II moved to the Konya Ark.

The reign of Allah Kuli Bahadur Khan (1825–1842) was characterized by the restoration of the central power in Khiva. He enjoyed some success in foreign policy and strengthened his commercial ties with the Russian Empire. This prosperity allowed him to build and richly decorate his new palace.

== Dimensions ==
- Overall: 80 meters х 80 meters;
- Harem: 80 meters х 42 meters;
- Harem courtyard: 49 meters x 15 meters;
- Mekhmonkhaneh: 43 meters х 36.5 meters;
- Arzkhaneh: 35 meters х 40 meters.

== Sources ==
- Ouzbékistan, guide Le Petit Futé, édition 2012, page 261, In French
- Iosif Notkin, The Tach-Khaouli Palace (Дворец Таш-Хаули), Tachkent, 1976, In Russian
- Khiva Info
