= Konya Ark =

Ancient fortress in Khiva, Uzbekistan

- Koʻhna ark
- Khiva in Uzbekistan
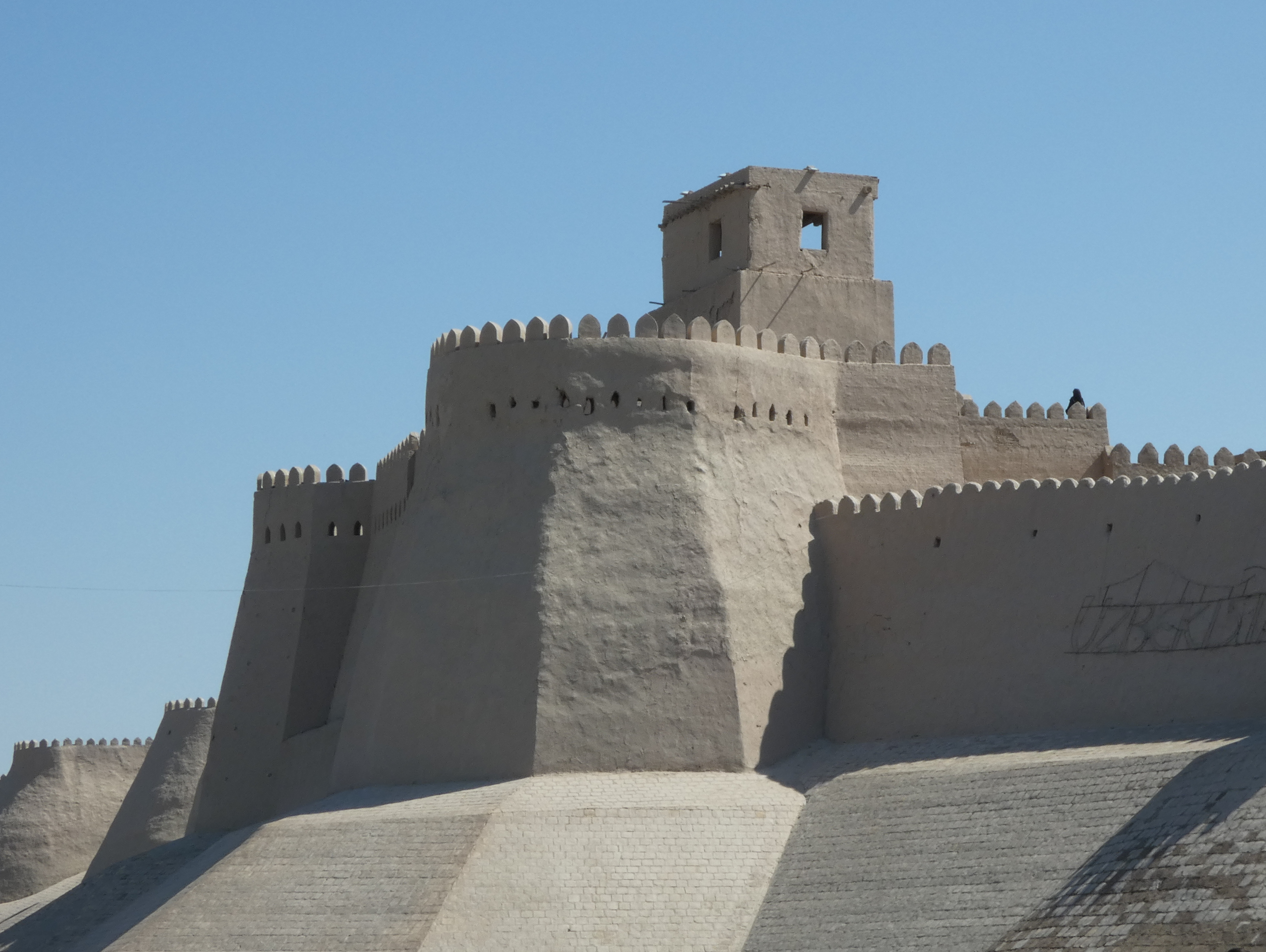

Site information
- Condition: Restored

Location
- Konya Ark in Khiva, Uzbekistan
- Coordinates: 41°22′44″N 60°21′29″E

Site history
- Built: 17th century CE

Konya Ark (Uzbek: Koʻhna ark Old Fortress) is the citadel in the Itchan Kala, the historic old town of Khiva in Uzbekistan. It is an outstanding part of the UNESCO World Heritage Site.

== Buildings ==
Konya Ark is located on the western side of the Itchan Kala, and covers. an area about 1.2 hectares. It was built in the 17th Century by the Khan of Khiva, Muhammad Erenke (Khan from 1687 to 1688), as an administrative centre for the Khanate of Khiva. The fortress was subsequently expanded, and 100 years later, Konya Ark housed the Khan's mosque, the residence, the supreme court, the reception area (Kurnysh Khan), a powder mill, the arsenal, the mint, harem, the kitchen, stables and other buildings.

== Kurnysh Khan ==
Konya Ark is entered via a massive gate flanked by two towers decorated with eye-catching blue tiles. Beyond the gate there is a further courtyard, on the western side of which Kurnysh Khan is located. The present Kurnysh Khan was built in the reign of Khan Iltuzar (1804-1806), with a courtyard with space for a yurt used in the summer. The courtyard is completed by an Iwan decorated with blue and white majolica and supported by two wooden columns on stone bases. In one of the bases, poems by the poet and historian Agahi were engraved. Next to the Kurnysh Khan is the throne room. The throne itself is a replica in a niche on the south wall. The original throne was made in 1816 and covered with fine silver leaf. It was taken to Moscow in 1873 after the conquest by the Tsarist Russian Empire, and is now kept in the Kremlin.

== Ak Sheikh Bobo, Mosque, Mint, Harem and living area ==
Northwest of Kurnysh Khan a corridor leads to the northern part of Konya Ark. The tower of Ak Sheikh Bobo is the highest point of Konya Ark, used as a watchtower. Nearby is the mint, built in the reign of Khan Muhammad Rahim I (1806-1825), who carried out tax reforms and created customs offices. More than 300 of the coins minted in Khiva are kept in the Hermitage in Saint Petersburg.

The Khan's mosque was built by Khan Alla Kuli (1825-1842). It is divided into an enclosed winter mosque and a summer mosque open to the courtyard. The summer mosque is an iwan with two-row wooden columns on stone bases. The walls, the mihrab, the minbar and the side turrets are lined with majolica, with complicated plant patterns.

At the foot of Ak Sheikh Bobo are the living quarters of the Khans of Khiva and the rooms of the Harem. This is the latest component of the citadel and was built under Said Muhammad Rahim II, who ruled from 1863 to 1910.
