= Itchan Kala =

World Heritage Site in Khiva, Uzbekistan

UNESCO World Heritage Site
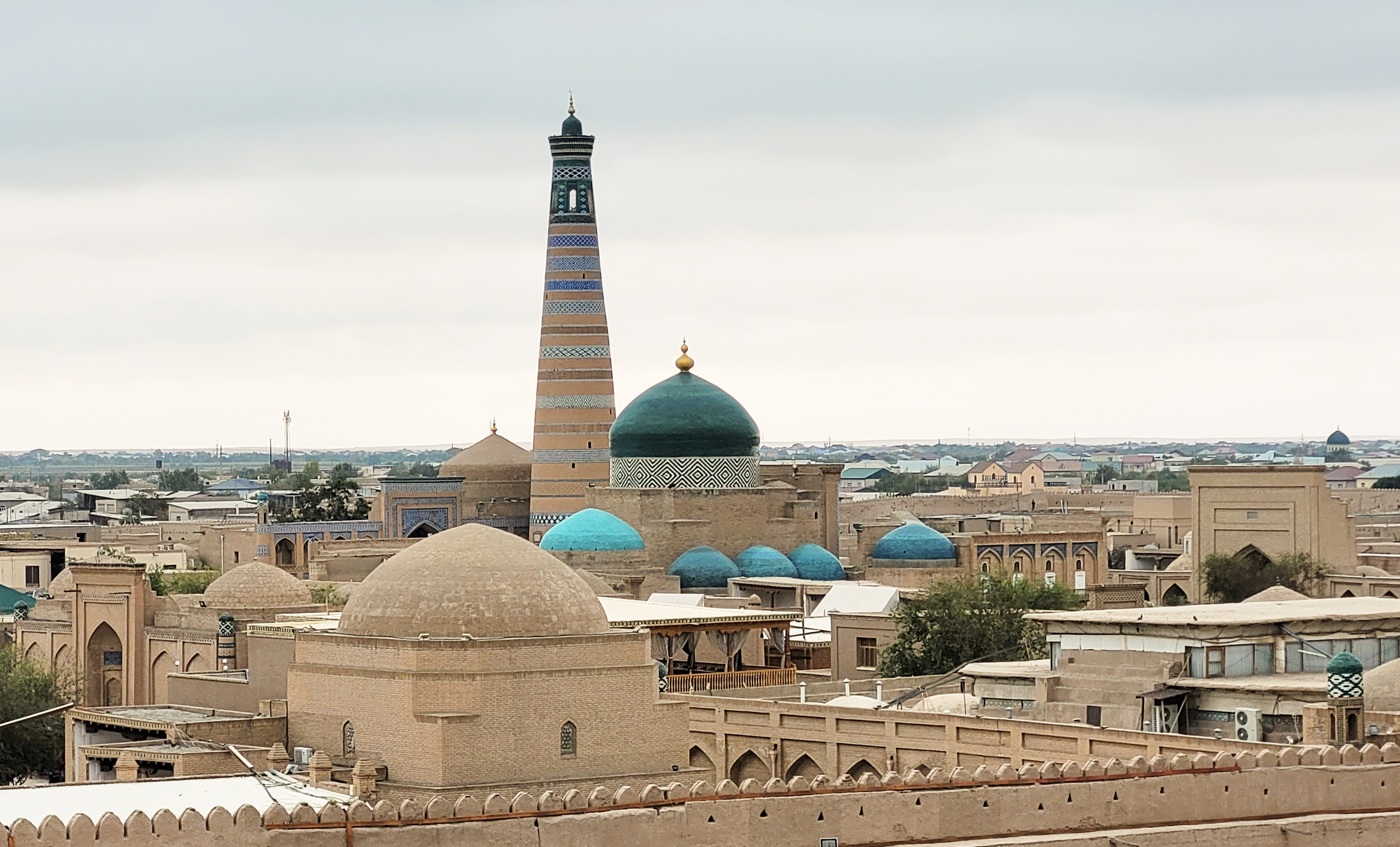
- View of Itchan Kala

- Location within Uzbekistan Location within West and Central Asia
- Location: Khiva, Uzbekistan
- Criteria: Cultural: (iii), (iv), (v)
- Reference: 543
- Inscription: 1990 (14th Session)
- Area: 37.5 ha (93 acres)
- Coordinates: 41°22′42″N 60°21′50″E

Itchan Kala (Uzbek: Ichan-Qаl’а) is the walled inner town of the city of Khiva, Uzbekistan. Since 1990, it has been protected as a World Heritage Site.

The old town retains more than 50 historic monuments and 250 old houses, dating primarily from the 18th or 19th centuries. Juma Mosque, for instance, was established in the 10th century and rebuilt from 1788 to 1789, although its celebrated hypostyle hall still retains 112 columns taken from ancient structures.

Notable buildings in Itchan Kala are Konya Ark, Juma Mosque, Ak Mosque, Hasanmurod Qushbegi Mosque, the madrasahs of Alla‑Kulli‑Khan, Muhammad Aminkhon, and Muhammad Rakhimkhon, the mausoleums of Pahlavon Mahmoud and Sayid Allavuddin, Shergozikhon, as well as caravanserais and markets.

== Legend of origin ==
According to legend, the clay from this area was used to build sites in Medina during the lifetime of the Prophet Muhammad, and the lake that appeared later is also considered sacred. In another legend, it is said that the sacred water channel of Khiva, known as the Xeyvak Canal, was dug by Shem, the son of Noah, who was said to possess a miraculous spade. Similarly, according to the tales, the construction of Khorezm began with Shem.

== Walls ==
In Khiva, the city is divided into two parts in the traditional way: the Inner City (Itchan Kala) surrounded by the Inner Defensive Wall, and the Outer City (robod) known as Dishan-Qal'a, surrounded by the Outer Defensive Wall.

The walls of the Itchan Kala are 8–10 meters high, 5–6 meters thick, and have a total perimeter length of 6250 meters. Both the outer and inner defensive walls are made of mud bricks. At intervals of every 30 meters along the inner city walls, there are watchtowers that project outward. The upper part of the walls features crenellations for shooting at enemies during times of conflict. Water-filled moats were part of the defensive system, and remnants of these can still be seen in the southern part of the city, while in the north and west, ancient clay pipes were used to cover the moats.

The city gates were also an integral part of the defensive system. The remaining gates are Bogcha Gate (North), Polvon Gate (East), Tosh Gate (South) and Ota Gate (West). They demonstrate that they were equipped with "zarba" towers on both sides of the passage, and galleries above the gate. The gates themselves often led to arched passageways, and if the road was particularly long, they featured multiple domes.

== Structure ==
The history of the construction of architectural monuments in Itchan Kala is mainly divided into four periods:

- The first period extended from the ancient period of Khorezm to the period of the Mongol invasion. The western wall of the Konya Ark, the ancient tower in the north‑eastern corner of the castle wall, and the remains of the castle wall have been preserved from that period.
- The second period was the restoration period of Khorezm after the Mongol invasion of 1220. During this period, the Said Alovuddin Mausoleum and other magnificent buildings were constructed.
- The third period corresponds to the 16th and 17th centuries. At that time (during the reigns of Abulgazi Khan and Asfandiyar Khan), Anusha Khan's bathhouse (1657), Ak Mosque (1675), and the madrasah of Khojamberdibi (1688) were built in Itchan Kala. The fortifications of the Konya Ark were strengthened, and a viewing hall (the reception hall of the khan) was built (1686–1688). As a result of the war between Bukhara and Iran for the Khanate of Khiva (in the first half of the 18th century), Itchan Kala and the city of Khiva itself were severely damaged (Khiva was a province dependent on Iran for some time).
- The fourth period spans the 18th to 20th centuries. During this period, mosques, madrasas, tims, and other buildings were constructed based on the traditions of local Central Asian architecture. A main road was built between the two gates of Itchan Kala. At the end of the 18th century, the Juma Mosque was rebuilt, and a tall minaret was erected next to it. The ruined walls of Itchan Kala were restored, and several buildings were repaired. In 1840–1842, the two‑storey tim (an indoor market) was built in front of the Kutlugmurad Inaq Madrasah. During the reigns of Muhammad Rahim Khan I (1806–1825), Alla-Kulli-Khan (1825–1842), and Muhammad Amin Bahadur Khan (1845–1855), the construction of Itchan Kala was accelerated. A magnificent palace, madrasas, and mausoleums were built: the construction of the palace in the Konya Ark was completed, and a new and large Toshhovli Palace was erected. A part of the fortress wall near the Polvan Gate was destroyed, and in its place the Alla‑Kulli‑Khan caravan palace, madrasa, and tim were built. The Pahlavon Mahmud Mausoleum, a wonderful example of folk art, was also erected. The Arab Muhammad Khan and Musa Torah Madrasas were also created during that period. Muhammad Amin Khan built a minaret known as Kaltaminor in the western part of Itchan Kala, next to the Konya Ark. Although this minaret was not finished, it is well known among the other monuments of Itchan Kala.

== Gallery ==
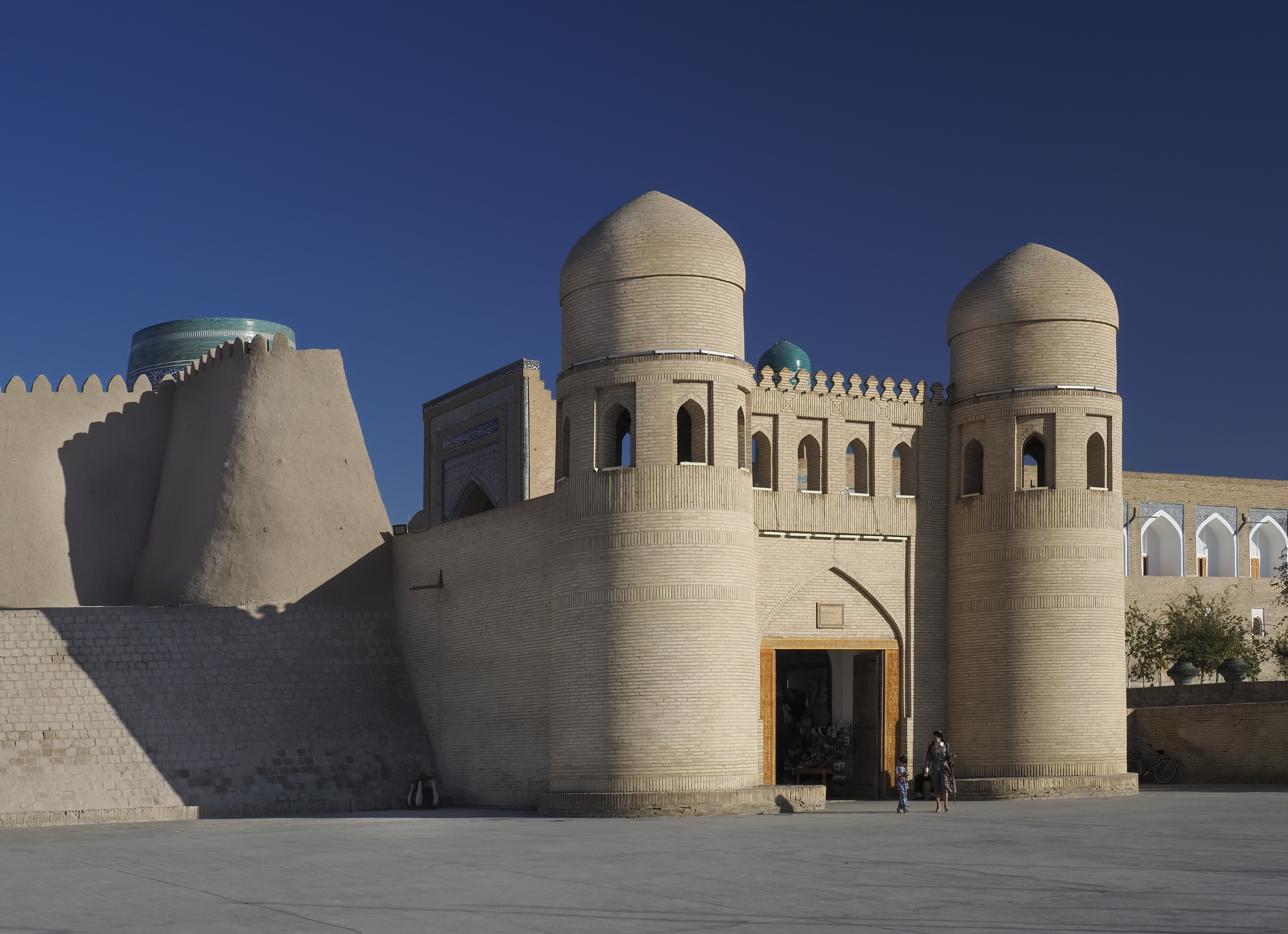
West gate

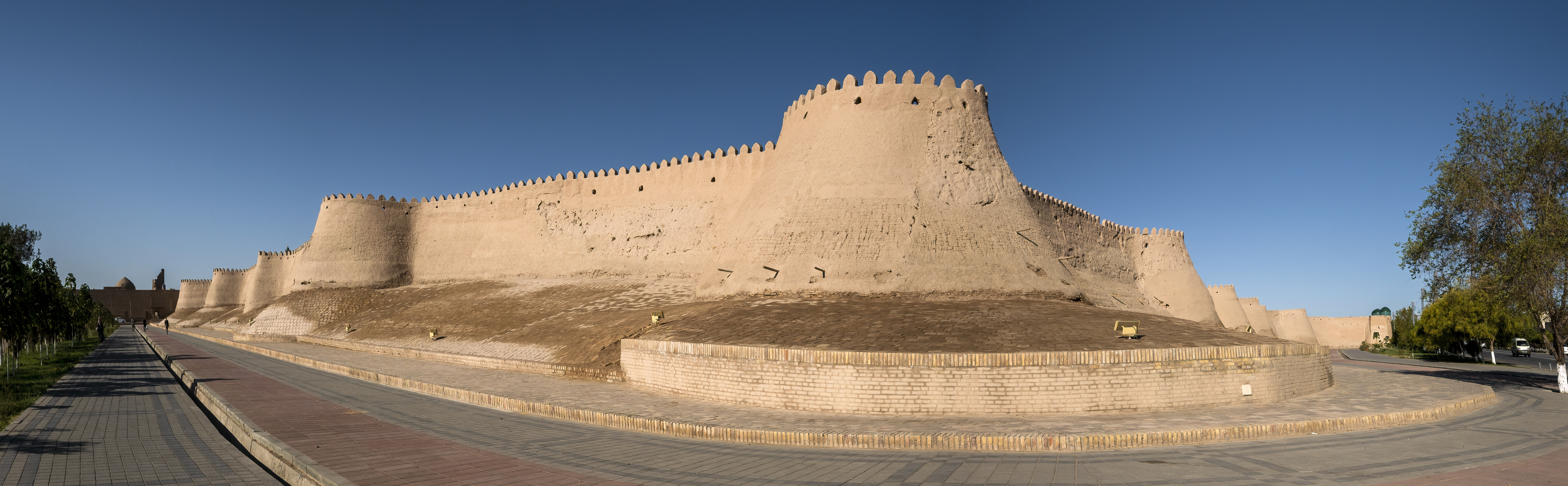
Itchan Kala walls

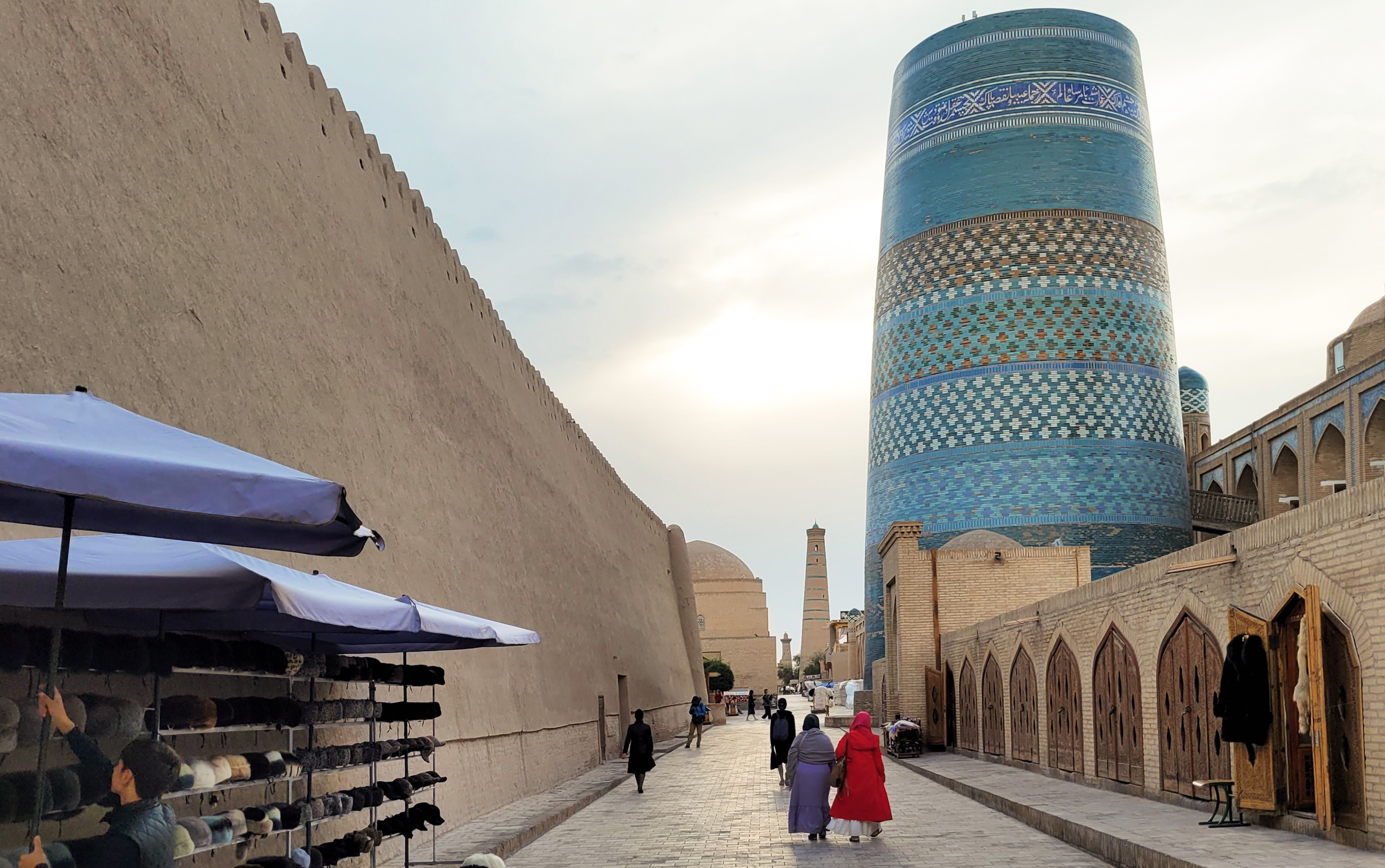
A street in the old city

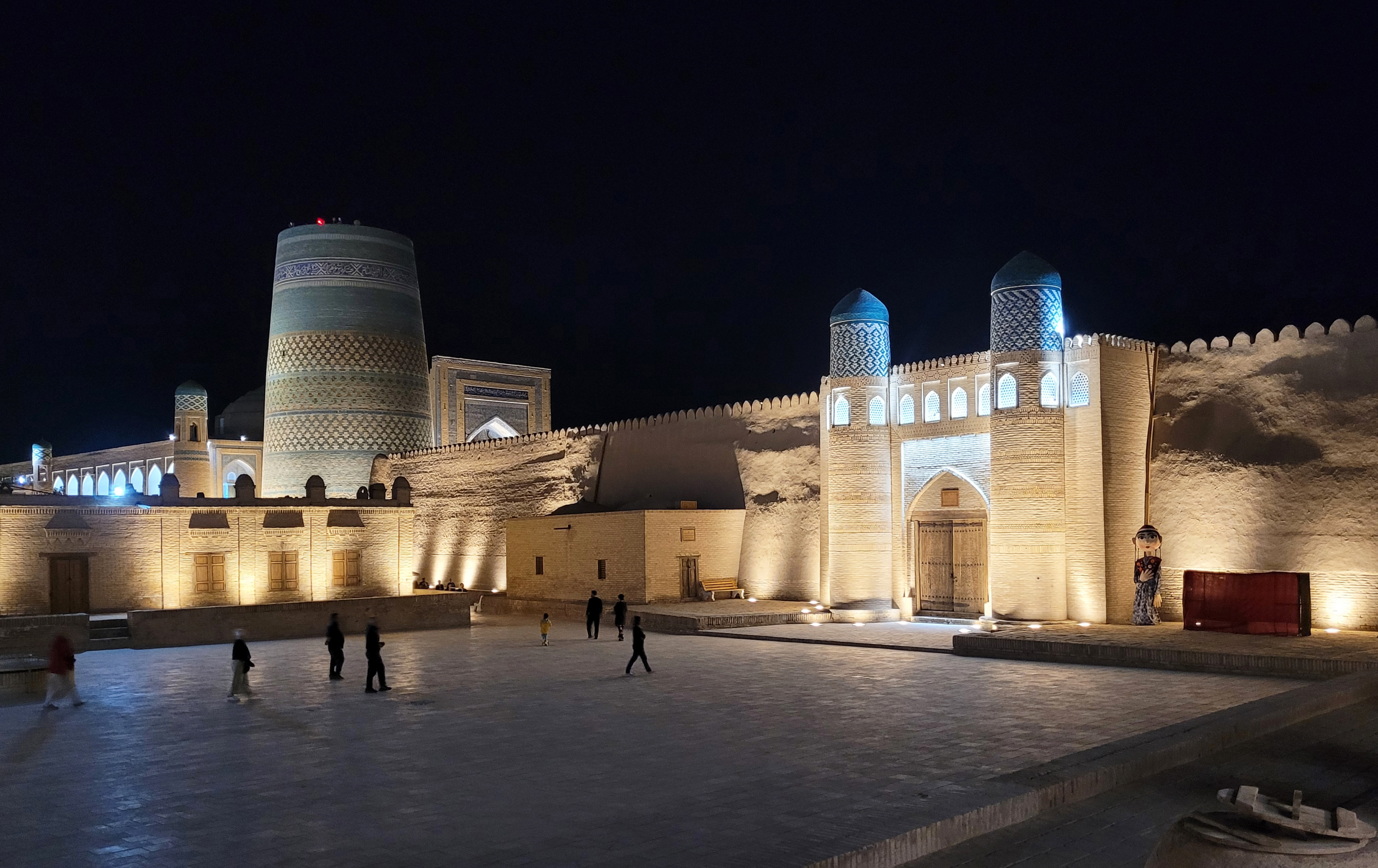
Itchan Kala by night

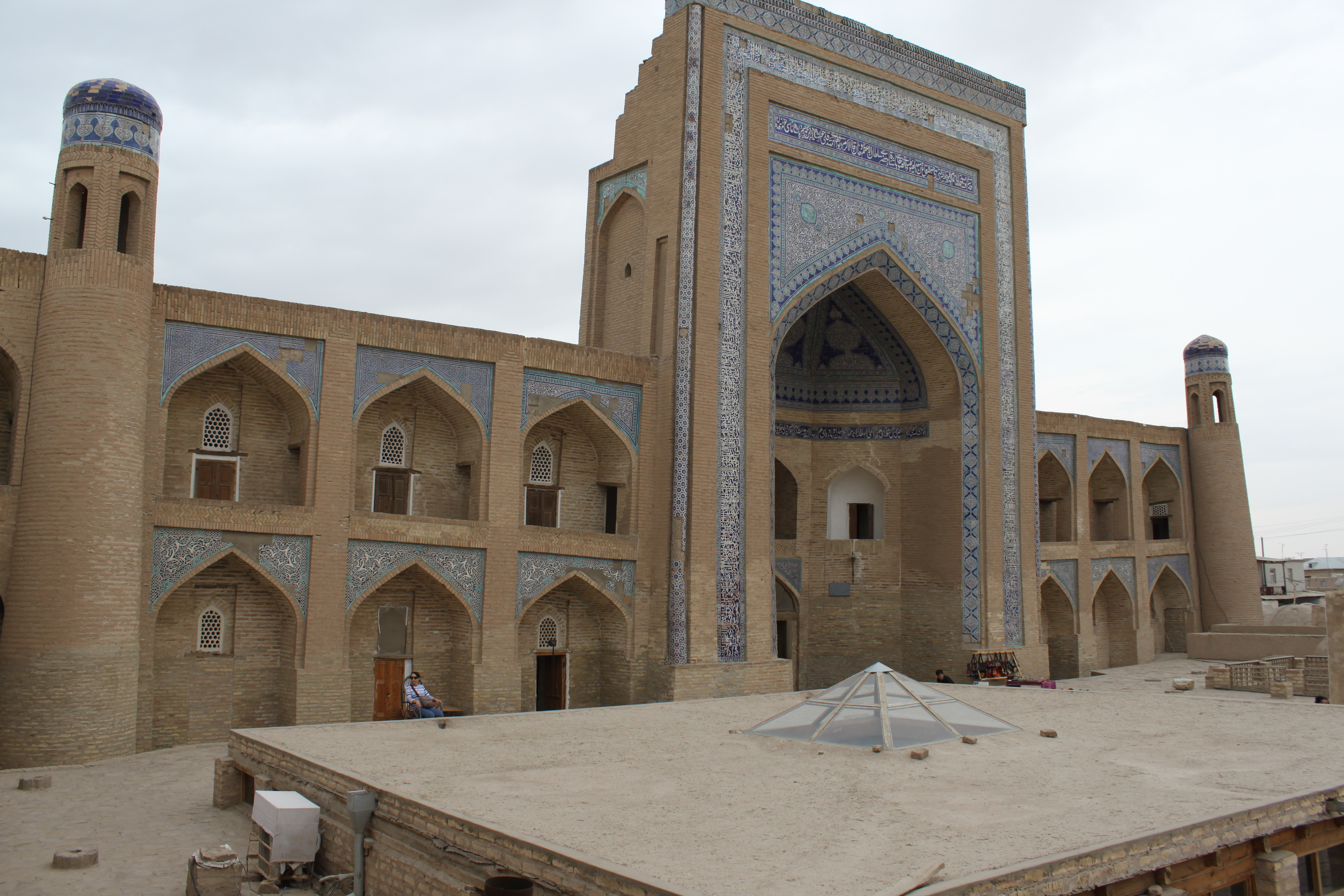
Alla Kouli Khan madrasa

== See also ==
- Dishan Kala
- Arab Muhammadkhan Madrasah
- Muhammad Aminkhan Madrasah
- Ishrat Hovli
