= Allah Kuli Bahadur Khan =

Khan of Khiva from 1825 to 1842

Allah Kuli Bahadur Khan (Turki and Persian: الله قلی بهادر خان) (c. 1794–1842), was the 5th Khan of the Uzbek Kungrat dynasty in the Khanate of Khiva. He reigned between 1825 and 1842.

== Biography ==
Allah Kuli (or Quli) ascended the throne in 1825, upon the death of his father Mohammed Rahim Khan.

He continued his father's policy of centralization. He put down the rebellion of the Turkmen Saryk tribe in 1828. He also continued the policy of economic recovery of the previous reign and had new canals dug and the irrigation system improved. In 1830–1831, the canal from Khiva to Konye-Urgench was dug.

Enemy of the neighboring Shaybanids dynasty of the rich Emirate of Bukhara, he carried out several raids against his neighbor. Likewise, he undertook five expeditions against Khorasan.

Allah Kuli strengthened diplomatic ties with the Russian Empire, the Ottoman Empire and Afghanistan, established new ties with Great Britain and tried to get closer ties with Persia. Two British envoys, James Abbott and Richmond Shakespear, were dispatched to the court of Khiva in 1840, as part of the Great Game between British and Russians. After the failed Russian Khivan campaign of 1839 and a brief cooling off in relationship, Khiva sent mufti Ataniaz Khodja Raïs as ambassador to Saint Petersburg to the court of Nicholas I, later in 1840.

Then in 1841, a Russian diplomatic mission, led by Captain Nikiphorov, was sent to the Tash Hauli Palace at the court of the Khan of Khiva. The following year, Nicholas I received the Khivaite ambassadors Vaïsbaï Niyazov and Imbaï Babaev in Saint Petersburg.

== Cultural influence ==
It was during the reign of Allah Kuli that the vast Tash Hauli Palace in the Itchan Kala was built, which was to serve as the official residence of the Khan in Khiva. The Tash Khauli Palace were constructed between 1830 and 1838 by about 1,000 slave laborers, and its first enslaved architect were reportedly impaled for his estimation that it would not be possible to construct the palace as fast as the monarch wished. A vast Madrasa bearing his name was also built (1834–1835), as well as a new Caravanserai (1832–1833), a tim (covered market under a dome), the Saïtbaï mosque, the Ak Mosque, etc. In 1842, the Khan built six kilometers of walls around Dishan Kala, the outlying district of Khiva. They were built in just a month.

It was also under his reign that the poet-historian Mounis Khorezmi, the poets Rodjikh, Dilavar, Said Mirza Djounaïd, and Mirza Massikho exercised their talents. Mounis Khorezmi and the historian Ogahi wrote a history of Khorezm.

When Allah Kuli died, his son Muhammad Rahim Kuli succeeded him. He reigned from 1842 to 1845. Another son of Allah Kuli, Mohammed Amin Khan, then took over.

== Sources ==
- Gulomov Kh. G., Diplomatic relations of the states of Central Asia with Russia in the 18th - first half of the 19th century. Tashkent, 2005
- Gulyamov Ya. G., History of irrigation of Khorezm from ancient times to the present day. Tashkent. 1957
- History of Uzbekistan. T.3. T., 1993.
- History of Uzbekistan in sources. Compiled by B.V. Lunin. Tashkent, 1990
- History of Khorezm. Edited by I. M. Muminov. Tashkent, 1976

Preceded by Mohammed Rahim Khan	Khan of Khiva; 1825–1842	Succeeded by Muhammad Rahim Kuli Khan
