= Abdolbobo Mausoleum =

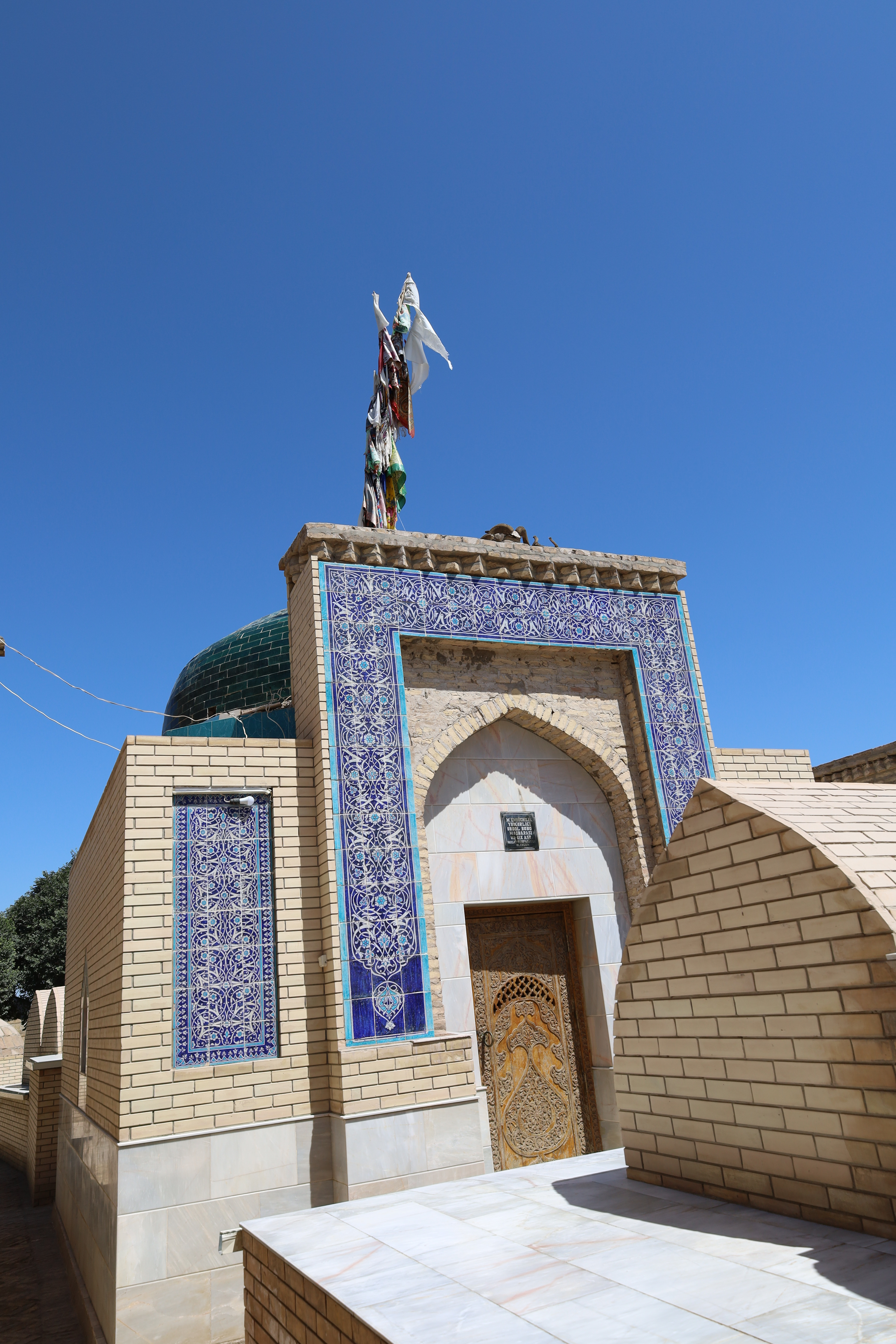
- Front view of Abdolbobo Mausoleum
- Interactive map of the Abdolbobo Mausoleum area

General information
- Type: Mausoleum
- Architectural style: Bukhara style
- Location: Khiva city, Khorazm region, Uzbekistan, Polvon Qoriy street, 21-house, Khiva, Uzbekistan
- Coordinates: 41°22′35.58″N 60°21′55.32″E
- Named for: Abdolbobo
- Year built: 18th-19th centuries

Design and construction
- Designations: National Register of Immovable Cultural Heritage Objects

The Abdolbobo Mausoleum (or Abdol bobo mausoleum) is an architectural monument in Khiva city, Khorazm region, Uzbekistan. The mausoleum dates back to the 18th-19th centuries and is located in the “Qumyasqa” neighborhood, outside the eastern gate of Itchan Kala. Abdolbobo mausoleum was included in Uzbekistan's National Register of Immovable Cultural Heritage Objects on October 4, 2019 and put under state protection. It is state property entrusted to the "Vaqf" charity foundation on the basis of a free use agreement.

== History ==
Abdolbobo mausoleum is located in the eastern part of Dishan Kala, south of Abdulla Nosfurush madrasa, east of Polvonqori madrasa. The mausoleum was built in honor of Abdolbobo, whose original name was Polvon Ahmad Zamchi, in the 18th-19th centuries. After the Arab invasion, Abdolbobo became one of the followers of Islam in Khiva. After his death, his burial place was surrounded by winter and summer mosques, Abdolbobo minaret, and a pool. Abdolbobo mausoleum was built in Bukharan style.

== Architecture ==
Abdolbobo mausoleum is surrounded by a complex consisting of a minaret, a mosque, and a pool. The complex was built in the place where the roads of Polvon Gate and Qo’shdarvoza met. Abdolbobo complex is not very large and extends to the cemetery outside the city. There was a slave market next to it.

The complex also includes a large neighborhood mosque with a minaret and a pool, built in the 19th century. The minaret is slender, its appearance is elegant, the green brick base rises to the top narrowing. The decorated cornice on the top is separated. The height of the minaret in the complex is 10 m, the diameter of the base is 3.2 m.

The mausoleum is a square-shaped room (external 5.7×5.4 m, internal 3.4×3.4 m) with a dome. The arches under the dome are decorated with two rows of muqarnas. The portal is connected to the mausoleum. Two rows of wooden cornices are carved on its top. The mosque (17.2×8 m) is four-columned, with two side and opposite ayvans, double-domed, the top of the minaret (base diameter 3.45 m, height 10 m) is mezzanine, the body is decorated with green glazed belts. The edge of the pool (14.6×13 m) is tiled.

== See also ==
- Muzrobshoh Khorezmi Mausoleum
