= Khojash Mahram Madrasah =

Madrasa in Khiva, Khorazm, Uzbekistan

- Khojashoh Mahram Madrasah

General information
- Architectural style: Central Asian Architecture
- Location: 11, Pahlavon Mahmud Street, Itchan Kala, Khiva, Khorazm Region, Uzbekistan
- Construction started: 1839
- Construction stopped: 1840
- Owner: State Property

Height
- Height: 7.5 m

Technical details
- Material: baked brick
- Floor count: 2
- Floor area: 21x19.5 m

Khojash Mahram Madrasah is an architectural monument in the city of Khiva, Khorazm Region of the Republic of Uzbekistan. The madrasah was built in 1839 by Khojash Mahram. Today, the madrasah is located at 11, Pahlavon Mahmud street, Itchan Kala, next to the Pahlavon Mahmud complex.

By the decision of the Cabinet of Ministers of the Republic of Uzbekistan on October 4, 2019, the Khojash Mahram Madrasah was included in the national list of real estate objects of tangible cultural heritage and received state protection. Currently, the Itchan Kala state museum-reserve is state property based on the right of operational management.

== History ==
Khojash Mahram madrasah was built for 30 students during the reign of Allah Kuli Khan in Khiva Khanate in 1839–1840 at the expense of Khojashah Mahram, the head of custom-house. It mainly provided religious and secular knowledge. Nevertheless, this madrasah was also intended for the training of customs officers, which was the wish of Khojash Mahram. Khojash Mahram, an ordinary Iranian slave who rose to the position of customs chief and became rich, donated 1,784 tanabs (tanab – one of the measurement unit of length) – 715 hectares of land from his personal property as a waqf for the provision of the madrasah. Muhammad Rahimkhan, who witnessed Khojash Mahram's bravery and business acumen, gave him great positions.
The word "Mahram" means the closest relative who cannot be married to each other. In addition, it is a word that is also used for a close private servant. Mahrams in the Khiva Khanate worked directly as advisors for the Khan in the state administration, they were divided into external and internal mahrams.

Currently, a wood carving school is operating in place of madrasah.

== Architecture ==
The madrasah is rectangular, one-story, and has a total area of 21x19.5 m. The main style is gabled (height 7.5 m), with a dome roof, there are rooms around the yard on both sides, and there are flower bouquets in both corners. The area of the courtyard (11.8x11.8 m), and the classroom (3.8x3.8 m) in its northeast corner and it is slightly pushed out. The two-story, domed palace behind the arch leads to the courtyard. The building style is made of brick, only the main style, facade and minaret are decorated with flower patterns, "dandana" borders and tiles.

== See also ==
- Matniyoz Devonbegi Madrasah
- Kutlugmurad Inak Madrasah
- Yusuf Yasovulboshi Madrasah
- Arab Muhammadkhan Madrasah
- Muhammad Amin Inak Madrasah
- Dost Alam Madrasah
- Khojamberdibi Madrasah
- Amir Toʻra Madrasah
