= Khojamberdibi Madrasah =

Madrasa in Khiva, Khorazm, Uzbekistan

- Khojashoh Mahram Madrasah
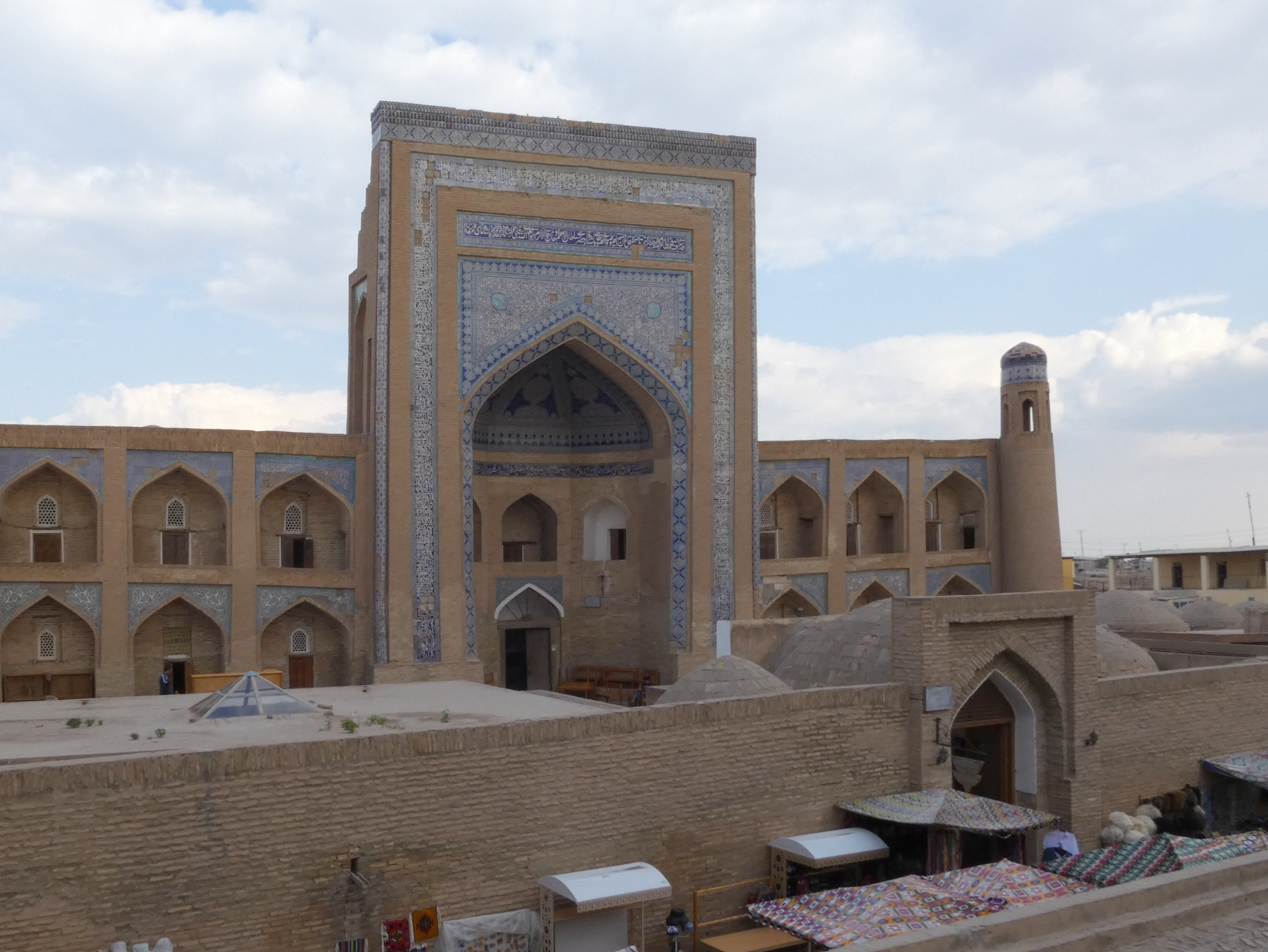
- Khojamberdibi and Olloqulixon Madrasas

General information
- Architectural style: Central Asian Architecture
- Location: 22, Zargarlar Street, Itchan Kala, Khiva, Khorazm Region, Uzbekistan
- Year built: 1688 (in some sources 1694–1695)
- Renovated: 1834
- Owner: State Property

Technical details
- Material: baked brick
- Floor area: 20x38 m

Khojamberdibi Madrasah is an architectural monument in the city of Khiva, Khorazm Region of the Republic of Uzbekistan. The monument was built in 1688 and rebuilt in 1834. It is in the Itchan Kala.

In 2019 the Cabinet of Uzbekistan included it in the national list of sites of tangible cultural heritage and it received state protection.

== History ==
Khojamberdibi madrasa is located east of the Polvon Gate, and was built by local landowners in 1688.

In 1834 the Khan of Khiva Allah Kuli Khan built a madrasa and a mosque for Qutlugh Murad Inaq. While a new madrasa named Olloqulixon Madrasa was building, Khojamberdibi madrasa was also rebuilt with two courtyards and its door faced west. The mosque and adjoining rooms had been preserved from the previous madrasa. As a result of the destruction of a part of the city wall during the construction process, the exterior wall of the madrasa fell into the courtyard of the Khojamberdibi madrasa. The reason for this was that the foundations of the two buildings were not at the same height. The large gable of the madrasa was demolished and a low passage connecting the courtyards was built in its place – the gatehouse.

== Architecture ==
Initially, Khojamberdibi Madrasah was built including a mosque, a 10-12-room (later 16) with a courtyard and a square layout (20x38 m). There is a corridor (ramp) leading to the courtyards and the Olloqulixon Madrasa from the simple one-domed gatehouse (3.0x3.0 m). There are 10 rooms in the northern courtyard (11.7x9.8 m) and 6 rooms and a classroom (3.5x3.5 m) in the southern courtyard (4x7 m); the mihrab on the wall of the classroom shows that it was used as a mosque. The appearance of the building is similar to the architectural form of Olloqulixon Madrasa, the rooms are low, sometimes with domes, without decoration; only the entrance doors are decorated with wood carvings. When the madrasa was commissioned, there were porches in the corners, and during the hottest part of the day, madrasa teachers and students rested there.

== See also ==
- Matniyoz Devonbegi Madrasah
- Matrasulboy Mirzaboshi Madrasah
- Yusuf Yasovulboshi Madrasah
- Arab Muhammadkhan Madrasah
- Khorezmshakhs' Madrasah
