= Polvonqori Madrasah =

Madrasa in Khiva, Khorazm, Uzbekistan

General information
- Architectural style: European Architecture
- Location: 24, Polvonqori Street, Dishan Kala, Khiva, Khorazm Region, Uzbekistan
- Coordinates: 41°22′34″N 60°21′51″E
- Year built: 1905
- Owner: State Property

Height
- Height: 21 m

Technical details
- Material: baked brick
- Floor count: 2

Polvangori Madrasah

Polvonqori madrasah is an architectural monument in Khiva, Khorazm Region of the Republic of Uzbekistan. The madrasa was built in 1905 with the funds of Khiva merchant Polvonqori. Today, the monument is located at 24, Polvonqori street, "Kumyaska" neighborhood.

By the decision of the Cabinet of Ministers of the Republic of Uzbekistan on October 4, 2019, the Polvonqori madrasah was included in the national list of real estate objects of tangible cultural heritage and received state protection. Currently, the Cultural Heritage Department of Khorezm Region is state property based on the right of operational management.

== History ==
The Polvonqori Madrasa and the minaret of the same name were built in 1905 under the leadership of Polvonqori, a well-known Khiva merchant. The madrasah is compact and built in a new style typical of the beginning of the 20th century, that is, in the European style. Also, the minaret was raised in the form of a new truncated cone [3]. The facts show that the merchant Polvonqori was not only a close adviser of Muhammad Rahimkhan II, but also a person who actively participated in establishing strong trade relations with the Russian Empire, Turkey, and other countries. The money necessary for the construction of the madrasa was allocated from the income of Polvonqori, who constantly develops his trade. Polvonqori madrasa is located near Saidbiy historical complex, it consists of 2-story madrasah, minaret; mosque.

Today, a hotel is operating in the territory of the madrasa. It has a garden, a common lounge, a balcony and a restaurant.

== Architecture ==
Polvonqori madrasa is the most monumental structure in the Dishan Kala. It was built in the eastern part of the Dishan Kala at the intersection of Qariyev and Polvan Qori streets. The madrasa has more than 15 rooms, a huge minaret, winter and summer mosques. Only the main entrance is decorated. For example, the upper part of the madrasa facade is decorated with green tiles. Green was also used to decorate the domes of small corner towers.

Polvonqori Madrasah is located in the southeastern part of Khiva. The main style of the madrasa is facing north. The corners are decorated with bouquet-like patterns. In the main style there is a classroom and a mosque, and in the middle there is a domed palace. It goes to the yard through the miyonsaray. The yard is surrounded by vaulted rooms. The top is decorated in a blue "fillet" style, and the top is finished with a two-line bow. The domes of the bouquet are blue. A separate minaret stands in front of the madrasa. Decorated belts are made of bricks and the top is finished with a dome. The height of the minaret is 21 m.

== See also ==
- Kutlugmurad Inak Madrasah
- Yusuf Yasovulboshi Madrasah
- Arab Muhammadkhan Madrasah
- Khoja Kurban Madrasah
