= Matpanoboy Madrasah =

Madrasa in Khiva, Khorazm, Uzbekistan

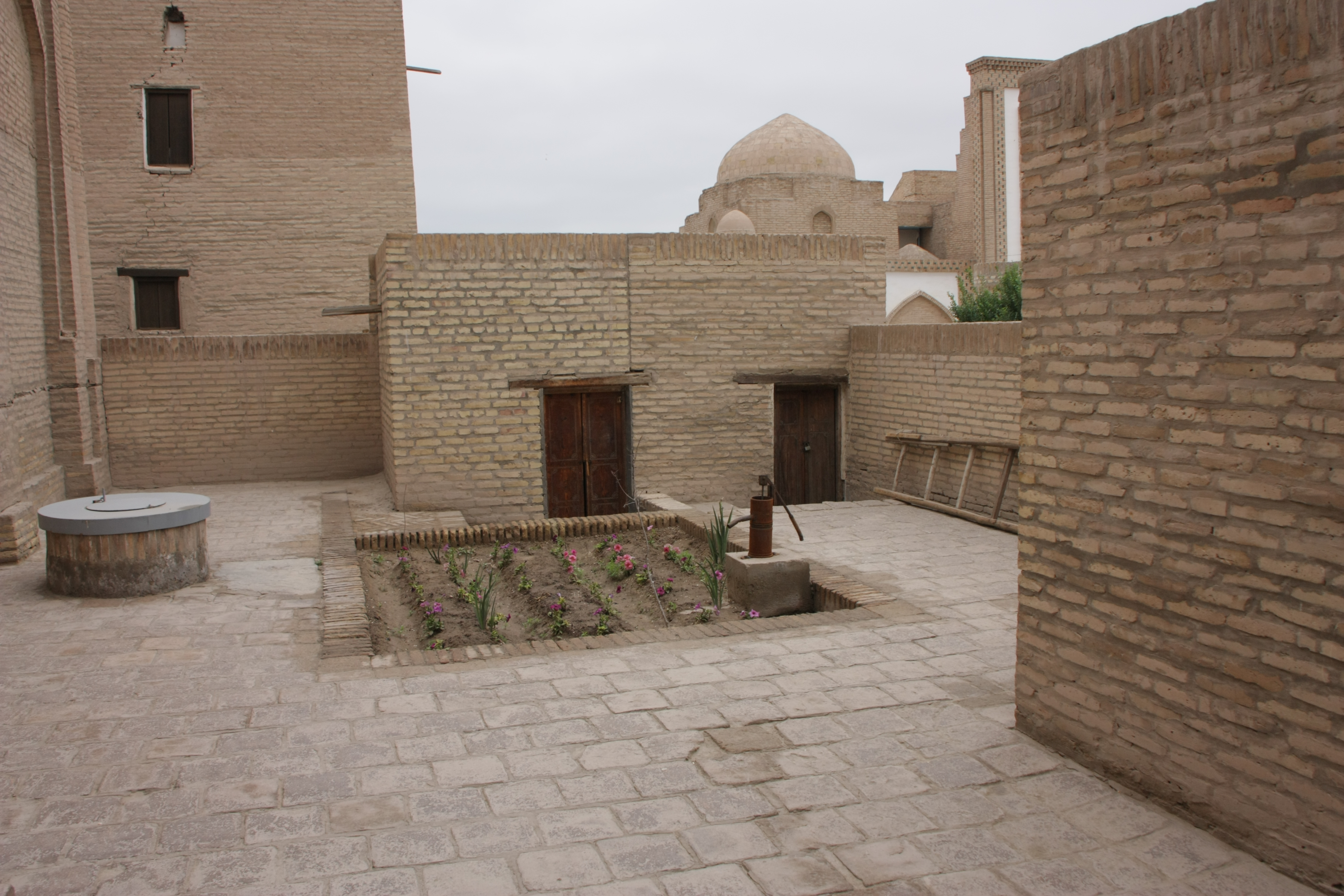

General information
- Architectural style: Central Asian Architecture
- Location: 25 Zargarlar Street, Itchan Kala, Khiva, Khorazm Region, Uzbekistan
- Year built: 1905
- Owner: State Property

Height
- Height: 9 m

Technical details
- Material: baked brick
- Floor area: 25.45x24.5 m

Design and construction
- Architects: Khudoibergan Haji and Qalandar Kochim

Matpanoboy Madrasah is an architectural monument in the city of Khiva, Khorazm Region of the Republic of Uzbekistan. The madrasa was built in 1905 with the funds of Matpanoboy, a rich merchant from Khiva. Khudoibergan Haji and Qalandar Kochim, the masters from Khiva, took part in its construction. Today, the madrasah is located at 25 Zargarlar street, "Itchan Kala" neighborhood.

By the decision of the Cabinet of Ministers of the Republic of Uzbekistan on October 4, 2019, the Khojash Mahram Madrasah was included in the national list of real estate objects of tangible cultural heritage and received state protection. Currently, the Itchan Kala state museum-reserve is state property based on the right of operational management.

== History ==
Matpanoboy Madrasah is located on the left side of Juma Mosque in the center of Itchan Kala. This madrasa was built in 1905 with the funds of one of the richest Khiva merchants. The buildings are located on the eastern side, and the madrasa is accessible from the corridor on the southern side.

The madrasa has more than a dozen cells (rooms) for students, a classroom under the southern dome, and a mosque. Descendants of Matpanoboy currently live in Tashkhovuz, Turkmenistan.

In October 2001, an exhibition of the "Avesta" Museum of History dedicated to the 2700th anniversary of the appearance of the Avesta book, considered one of the oldest books, was opened in the madrasa. The exhibition revealed the role of Zoroastrianism, one of the ancient world religions, and the Avesta book in the development of world culture. Currently, the madrasa is a tourist service and exhibition facility, where the Museum of Avestan History operates. At the moment, exhibitions dedicated to the life and work of the great Turkmen poet Mahtumkuli and the famous Karakalpak poet Ájiniyaz are being organized at the madrasa.

By visiting the Avesta Museum, one can get complete information about the most ancient history, lifestyle, rituals and customs, spiritual culture, science and other fields of the peoples of Central Asia and the East as a whole.

== Architecture ==
The madrasah is rectangular in shape (25.45x24.5 m), has a pediment (height 9 m), a 3-domed mosque, a classroom and a mosque. The palace is divided into 3 parts, from one to the other through arches. The courtyard (19.5x S.6 m) has a front row of rooms with arches and verandas. The Matpanoboy Madrasah was built of hard brick, without decoration, it is distinguished only by its door made of wood carvings and the unique decoration of the ganchkori fence in the miyonsarai. In 1977, the small courtyard was surrounded by a wall in front of the main style.

== See also ==
- Matniyoz Devonbegi Madrasah
- Kutlugmurad Inak Madrasah
- Yusuf Yasovulboshi Madrasah
- Arab Muhammadkhan Madrasah
- Dost Alam Madrasah
