= Tosh Gate =

Historical monument in Khiva

Coordinates: 41°22′29″N 60°21′35″E

- Toshdarvoza, Tosh darvoza
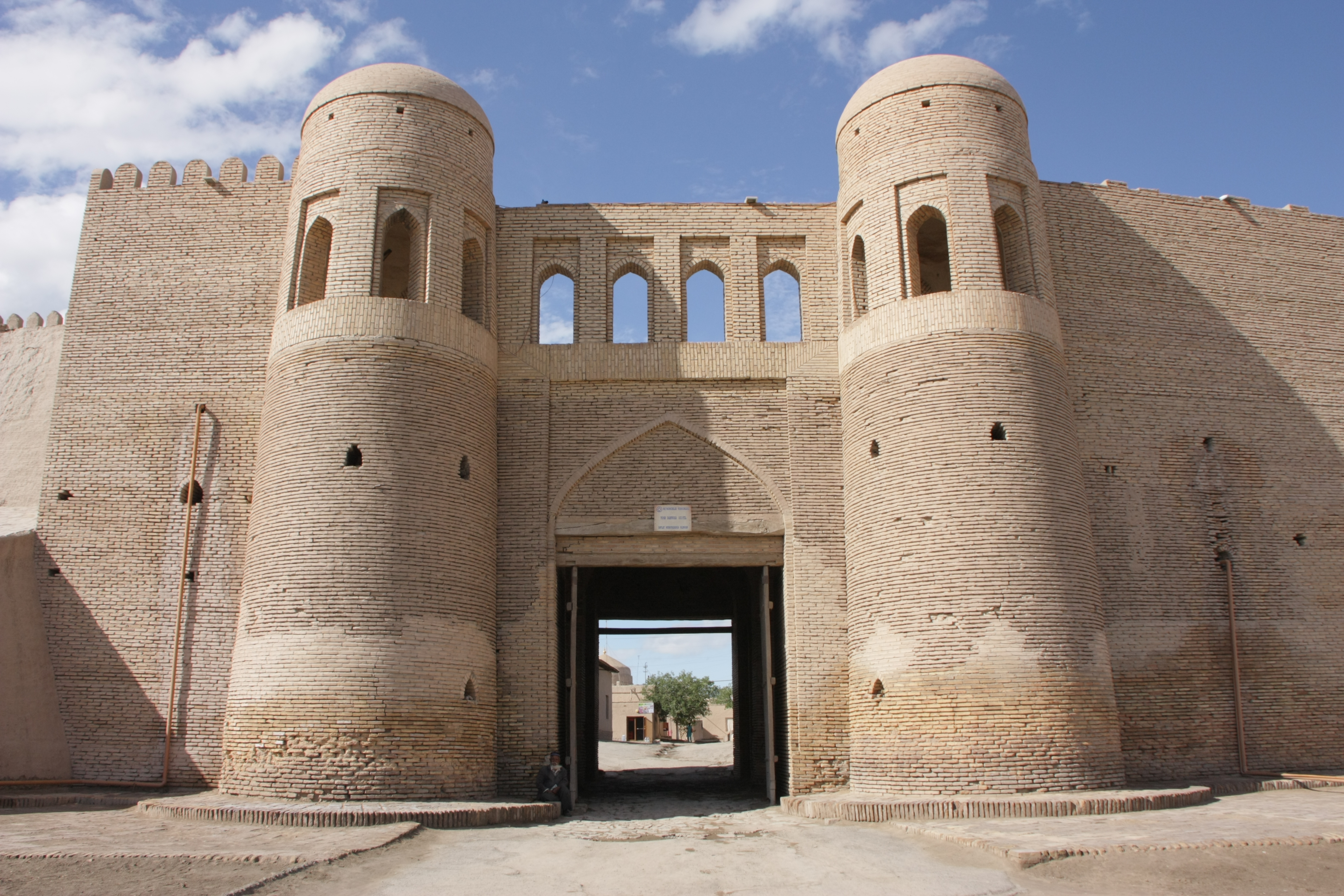
- Tosh gate in Khiva
- Interactive map of Tosh Gate
- Location: Khiva, Khorezm Region, Uzbekistan
- Type: Gate
- Material: Brick, wood
- Width: 4.83 m
- Height: 10 m
- Beginning date: 18th century

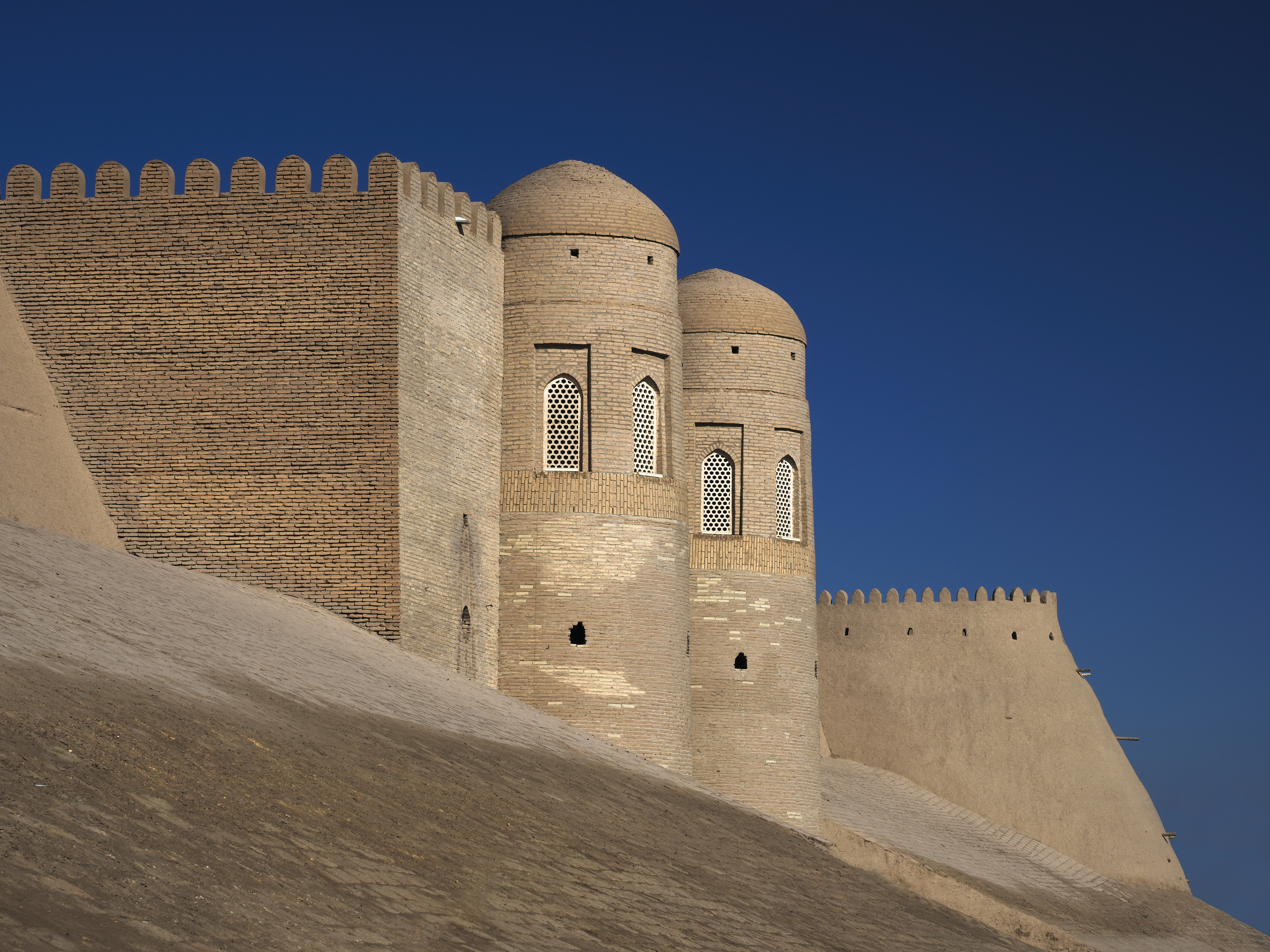
Tosh Gate from West

The Tosh Gate is a historical monument in Khiva city, Khorezm Region, Uzbekistan; the southern gate of the Itchan Kala. The gate dates back to the 18th-19th centuries and is currently located at the “Itchan Kala” district, Pahlavon Mahmud street, house 21.

Toshdarvoza was included in the National Register of Immovable Cultural Heritage Objects by the decree of the Cabinet of Ministers of the Republic of Uzbekistan on October 4, 2019, and was taken under state protection. It is currently under the operational management of the Itchan Kala State Museum-Reserve.

== History ==
There are four gates in Khiva city, facing four directions of the world. The gates lead to the Itchan Kala. They are Bogcha Gate, Polvon Gate, Tosh and Ota Gate. Among them, Toshdarvoza is the gate located on the south side. The gates were named according to their location or some other distinctive feature. Toshdarvoza was built in the second half of the 18th century and was initially called Angarik Gate, as it was the exit to the Angarik village.

In 1842, Olloqulikhan built the wall of the Dishan Kala, creating two close gates. They were named Angarik Gate and Tosh Gate. At that time, the old southern gate of the Ichan Kala, Angarik Gate, remained inside, and was renamed Tosh (or Dosh Gate). In the early 20th century, there was a market in front of the gate area, so the square was called “Old Market”, and the gate was known as "Old Market Gate".

Bogcha Gate is a multi-roomed building, oriented from north to south, that served as a city defense and was closed at night. The gatekeepers lived near the gate and their salary ranged from four to ten tills. The inner part of the Bogcha Gate has two large domes and four small rooms on the sides of the central corridor, covered with small domes. These rooms used to function as customs and treasury.

== Architecture ==
The gate has six sections, with a plan of 19.7×17.0 m, a height of 10 m, a two-domed section in the passage, and small domed rooms (3.2×3.2 m) on both sides, connected by corridors with towers (southern side rooms). There are archer rooms in the towers. The top of the gate's arch and the two side towers are aligned. The gate's layers are made of wood. The exterior and interior sides are plain, simple, with broken domes. The width of the gate's passage is 4.83 m. The top of the towers can be reached by a spiral staircase on the northern arch. The gate's head is graceful. The style and interior are plain.

== See also ==
- Itchan Kala
