= Bogcha Gate =

- Bogʻcha darvoza (Uzbek)
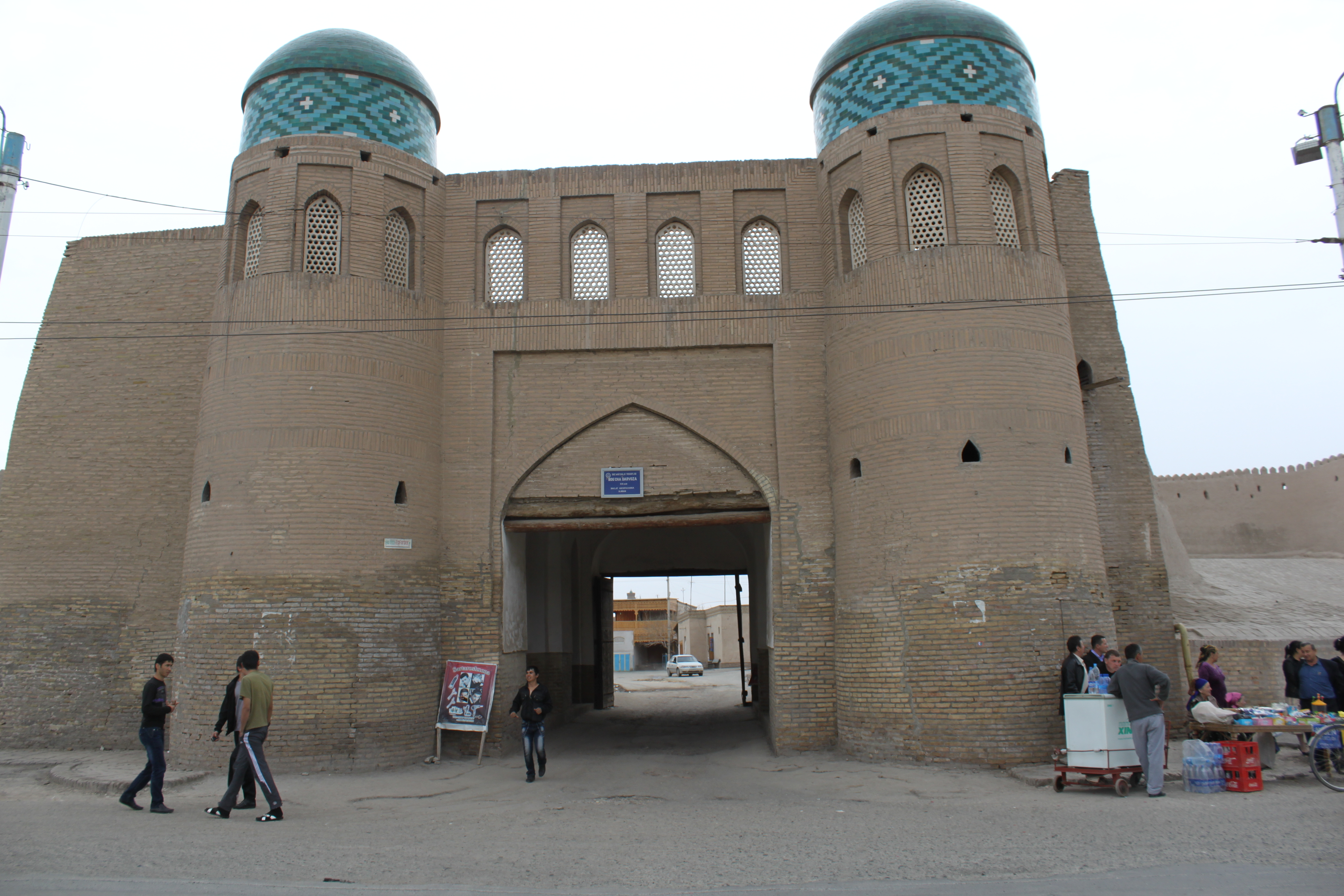
- North Gate Khiva
- Interactive map of Bogcha Gate
- 41.38170857218824°N 60.36122192510731°E
- Location: The city of Khiva
- Nearest city: Khiva

History
- Built for: Protection for the city of Khiva

Site notes
- Restored: 1959–1960

Bogcha Gate (uzbek: Bogʻcha darvoza) is the northern gate of the Khiva citadel, Itchan Kala. It was built in the 19th century. Currently, it is listed as a site of the national cultural heritage of Uzbekistan. It is also part of the UNESCO World Heritage List as a component of the historical part of the city of Khiva.

== History ==
The Bogcha Gate is a symmetrical structure within the fortress wall of Itchan Kala. The elongated passageway is covered by two domes, supported by four longitudinal and transverse arches and false spherical sails. On the transverse axes of the domes, square domed chambers for sentries and customs officers are situated on either side, with niches extending under the domes. The northern chambers are connected through passages to hollow inside two-story facade towers that flank the wide rectangular passage, formed by a flat arch with a set of tongs.

The southern facade of the gate, facing Itchan Kala, is less grand but follows a similar composition, though it is smaller and lacks a Revak. Unlike the Tosh Darvoza, the stairs leading to the upper part of the gate project from the southern corners of the towers are positioned on their sides, deep inside the walls of Itchan Kala. The gates originally measured 18.0x16.0 meters and reached a height of 8.5 meters. The gate is adorned with six domes, all of the same shape and size. Above the arch of the entrance portal, two large domes were constructed, and adjacent to the gate, there were market stalls. The entrance to the gate is in the form of an arch. The gate's facade is devoid of ornamentation, plastered inside and left in brickwork with the joints finished in plaster on the exterior. The only embellishment consists of horizontal bands of polished brick placed on the edge of the towers.

The Bogcha Gate has undergone several reconstructions, first during the Soviet era in 1959–1960 and later in the years of Uzbekistan's independence in 1997.

== See also ==
- Polvon Gate
- Toshdarvoza Gate
- Ota Gate
