= Yunuskhan Mausoleum =

Coordinates: 41°22′38.5″N 60°21′33.2″E

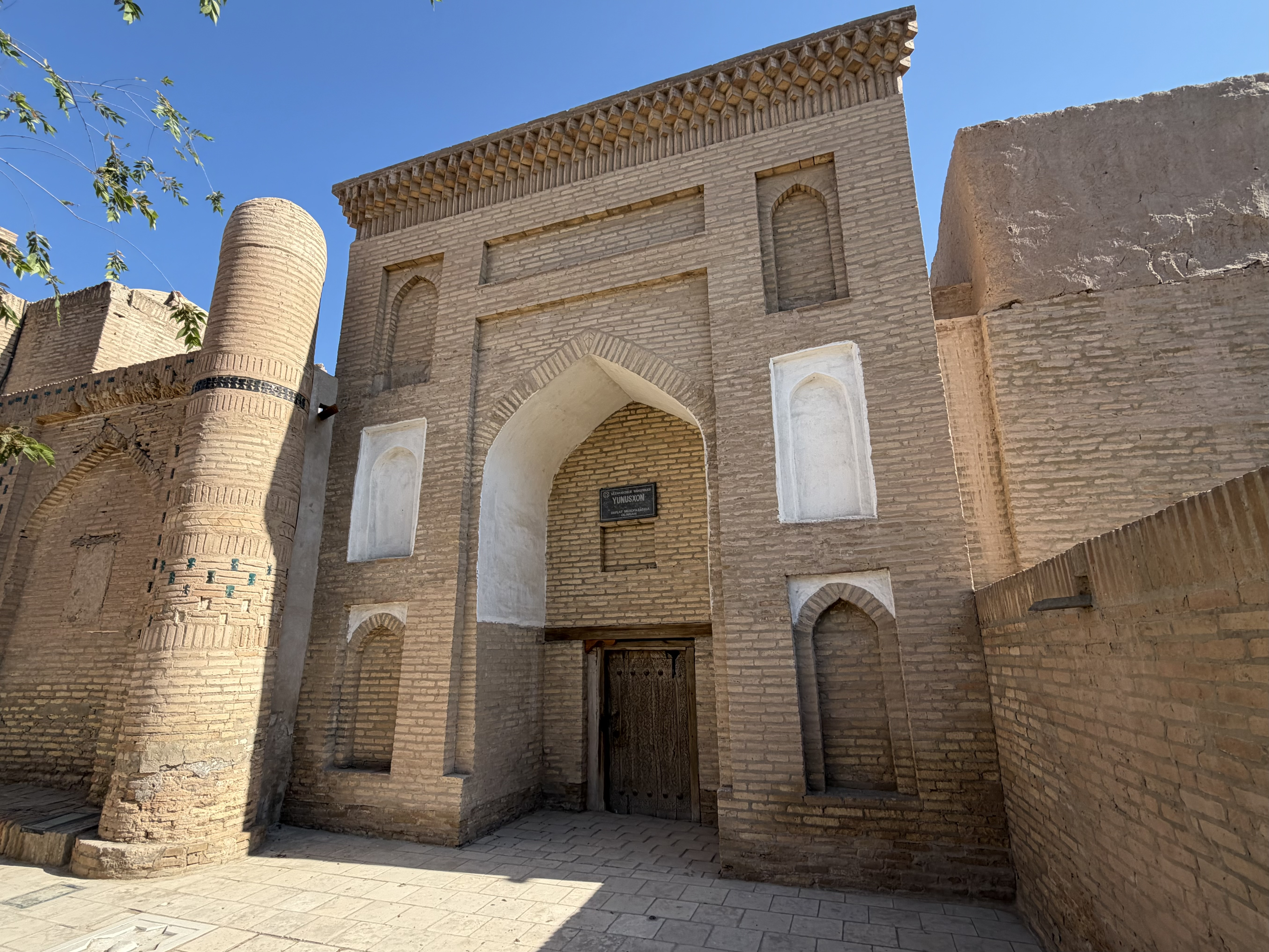
- Interactive map of the Yunuskhan Mausoleum area

General information
- Location: 13, Pahlavon Mahmud Street, Itchan Kala, Khiva, Khorazm Region, Uzbekistan
- Year built: 1559
- Owner: State Property

Technical details
- Material: baked brick
- Floor area: 7x13.5 m

Yunuskhan Mausoleum is an architectural monument in the city of Khiva, Khorazm Region of the Republic of Uzbekistan. The mausoleum was built in 1559. Today, the mausoleum is located at 13, Pahlavon Mahmud street, Itchan Kala, next to the Pahlavon Mahmud complex.

By the decision of the Cabinet of Ministers of the Republic of Uzbekistan on October 4, 2019, the Yunuskhan mausoleum was included in the national list of real estate objects of tangible cultural heritage and received state protection. Currently, the Itchan Kala state museum-reserve is state property based on the right of operational management.

== History ==
Yunuskhan Mausoleum was built in Khiva in the second half of the 14th century, in 1558-1559. It is located in the south of the Khojash Mahram Madrasah and in the back-north side of the famous Pahlavon Mahmud complex, and is a part of this complex. Yunus Khan was buried in one of the rooms of this mausoleum. However, it is not known who was buried in the second grave in the mausoleum.

== Architecture ==
The mausoleum is rectangular in shape, the total area is 7x13.5 m. It consists of a building with a high gable and two domes, a tomb and a shrine (4.5x4.5 m). The rooms are separated from each other by arches. Flat and wide arches are made on the inner walls. A cave with a hut is entered through the shrine. All rooms are covered with domes. The inner walls are under the dome, and the bricks of the archways are laid in waves. The mausoleum was built of simple baked bricks, without any decoration.
