= Shohimardon Complex =

Shohimardon complex
- Interactive map of the Shohimardon complex area

General information
- Architectural style: Islamic
- Location: Shixlar neighborhood, Khiva city, Khorezm region, Uzbekistan
- Coordinates: 39.983°N 71.800°E
- Year built: 19th century
- Renovated: 18th century (minaret)
- Owner: State property of Uzbekistan

Technical details
- Size: 90 km2 (35 sq mi)

The Shohimardon complex is an architectural monument in Khiva city of Khorazm Region of Uzbekistan. The construction of the complex was completed in the 19th century, and currently it is located in the “Shixlar” neighborhood.

Shohimardon complex was included in the National Register of Immovable Property Objects of Material Cultural Heritage by the decision of the Cabinet of Ministers of the Republic of Uzbekistan on October 4, 2019, and was taken under state protection. Currently, it is considered as state property on the basis of operational management rights of the Khorezm region culture administration.

== History and construction ==
Shohimardon complex is located 500 meters west of Dishan Kala, near the territory of Pahlavon Mahmud complex in Khiva. Shohimardon complex is the central part of the memorial complex, which also includes a madrasa (late 19th century) and a prison (1908). The cemetery of the complex was initially buried by the Khorezmshah warriors. In the 13th century, a cemetery was formed around the complex. The complex also has a Shohimardon minaret built for Elbarsxon, the Khan of Khiva in 1512–1535. It was rebuilt in the middle of the 18th century. According to the locals, Iranian soldiers who died in 1740 when the Iranian Shah Nader Shah captured Khiva city were buried in Shohimardon cemetery. The minaret was also built at that time.

The complex consists of various mausoleums, prisons, kitchens, walls (mullahs) and dormitories for pilgrims built around it, as well as the mausoleums of the khan families and nobles. The main mausoleum built in honor of the caliph Ali in Khorezm is known as Shohimardon, which has a four-arched dome, one room, two rows of wooden columns at the end of the arch, and its surface is covered with green “pechak” and “square” shapes made of majolica. There are 3 prisons located along the road, which are built in the style of the late period architecture. Two mausoleums with arches of the same size (one with 7 domes, the other with 2 domes) are located on the side walls, decorated with traditional flat carvings. The underground mausoleum, widely known as “Qo’sh mozor”, consists of 3 parts, the main part of which is accessed through the arch to the central room - the miyonsaroy, and the side rooms are covered with domes, decorated with carved ganch. Some buildings are destroyed.

Shohimardon complex was closed during the Soviet period due to the government's anti-Islamic policy. However, most of the population continued to visit it. On March 27, 1945, by the decree No. 410 of the Council of People's Commissars of the Uzbek SSR, the right to use seven of the most visited shrines by Muslims was transferred from the authority of the Architecture Works Administration under the Council of People's Commissars of the Uzbek SSR to the Religious Administration of Muslims of Central Asia and Kazakhstan. Shohimardon was also among them. Shohimardon was not officially used by Muslims for a long time. During this period, the Religious Administration of Muslims of Central Asia and Kazakhstan built a guest house and a hydrotherapy clinic near the Shohimardon mausoleum. The decree No. 9363-rs of the Council of Ministers of the USSR on June 18, 1950, allowed the Uzbek government to confiscate Shohimardon from the Religious Administration of Muslims of Central Asia and Kazakhstan.
