= Mozori Sharif Madrasa =

Madrasa in Khiva, Khorazm, Uzbekistan

The Mozori Sharif Madrasa is an architectural monument in Khiva city of Khorezm region of the Republic of Uzbekistan. Currently, the madrasa is located in the Pahlavon Mahmud street, house 20. It was built in 1882 by the order of Muhammad Rahim Khan II (Feruz) and the funds of his son and ruler of Toshhovuz - Iso To’ra - by the master Qalandar Kochim.

Mozori Sharif madrasa was included in the National Register of Immovable Cultural Heritage Objects by the Resolution of the Cabinet of Ministers of the Republic of Uzbekistan on October 4, 2019, and was taken under state protection. Currently, it is considered as state property on the basis of the operational management right of the Itchan Kala State Museum-Reserve.

== History ==
Mozori Sharif madrasa is located on the south-eastern side of the Pahlavon Mahmud Complex and on the eastern side of the entrance to the Pahlavon Mahmud mausoleum. The madrasa was built in 1882 by the Khiva khan Muhammad Rahim Khan II with the help of the Khorezm master Qalandar Kochim. It is adjacent to the Otajonboy Madrasah from the eastern side. The entrance to the monument is located on its southern wall and leads to the courtyard through a large arch with a gallery. Only the entrance part of the madrasa is decorated with glazed green tiles in the “bantak” style. The door and the wooden carving above it are made in the “yog’och oymakorligi” style. The courtyard (11.6x6.2 m) is accessed through a portal with a domed niche. Around the courtyard there are cells with vaulted domes. There are no separate rooms for the classroom and the mosque in the Mozori Sharif madrasa.

There are various legends among the Khivans about the construction of the madrasa.

According to the first legend, the initiator of the construction of this small madrasa fell ill in the city of Mazar-i Sharif in Afghanistan when he returned from the Hajj and vowed to build a madrasa named after that city if he returned to his homeland safely. After fulfilling his promise, he built the madrasa and said, “my Mazar-i Sharif is here” and thanked God. According to the information given by Hasanmurod qori Laffasiy, who wrote a biography of the poets of the Khiva Khanate period, To’ra Murodto’ra, who wrote poems under the pen name Murodiy, died at the age of 54 in 1906 and was buried in this madrasa. To’ra Murodto’ra was the cousin of Muhammad Rahim Khan II - Feruz.

According to the second legend, the son of the Khiva khan of that time - Feruz, Iso to’ra fell ill in Istanbul during his pilgrimage to Mecca. Then his relatives put him in a coffin and took him to Hajj and brought him back. After returning to Khiva, he told his father about the events that happened to him. Muhammad Rahim Khan II (Feruz) said to him: “You have to endure the difficulties on the way to Hajj”. After a while, following his father's advice, Iso to’ra went to Mecca again for Hajj. On his way back, he fell ill again in the city of Mazar-i Sharif in northern Afghanistan. After returning to Khiva, the weakened Iso to’ra built a small madrasa named Mozori Sharif for his relatives.

Architectural style The madrasa (28.6x15.8 m) is one-story, with a main facade facing south. The portal is decorated with green glazed bricks in the “bantak” style. The door and the wooden carving above it are made in the “yog’och oymakorligi” style. The courtyard (11.6x6.2 m) is accessed through a portal with a domed niche. Around the courtyard there are cells with vaulted domes. There are no separate rooms for the classroom and the mosque in the Mozori Sharif madrasa.

== See also ==
- Qilichboy Madrasa
- Sharifboy Madrasa
- Muhammad Amin Inoq Madrasa
