= Otajonboy Madrasah =

Madrasa in Khiva, Khorazm, Uzbekistan

- Interactive map of the Otajonboy Madrasah area

General information
- Architectural style: Central Asian Architecture
- Location: 23, Pahlavon Mahmud Street, Itchan Kala, Khiva, Khorazm Region, Uzbekistan
- Coordinates: 41°22′36″N 60°21′35″E
- Year built: 1884
- Renovated: 1970–1980
- Owner: State Property

Technical details
- Material: baked brick
- Floor count: 2
- Floor area: 19.9x17.25 m

Otajonboy Madrasah (or Otajon Boy Madrasah) is an architectural monument in Khiva, Khorazm Region of the Republic of Uzbekistan. The madrasa was built in 1884 at the expense of Otajonboy, a rich man from Khiva. Today it is located at 23, Pahlavon Mahmud street, "Itchan Kala" neighborhood.

By the decision of the Cabinet of Ministers of the Republic of Uzbekistan on 4 October 2019, the Otajonboy Madrasah was included in the national list of real estate objects of tangible cultural heritage and received state protection. Currently, the Itchan Kala state museum-reserve is state property based on the right of operational management.

== History ==
In 1842, the ruler of the Khiva Khanate, Ollokulikhan, ordered a part of Khiva to be surrounded by a special wall and called this part of the city Itchan Kala. Many madrassas and mosques were built in Khiva in the 19th century. Otajonboy madrasa was built next to Mazori Sharif madrasah in Khiva. It was built in 1884 with the initiative and funds of Khiva landowner Otajonboy. The madrasa is one of the last buildings in the Pahlavon Mahmud complex. When viewed from above, its shape looks like an asymmetric rectangle, extending transversely from east to west, in relation to the external entrance on its southern wall.

There is an internal corridor between Otajonboy madrasa and Mazori Sharif madrasa. These two madrasahs appear to be a single complex due to their proximity to each other.

Madrasa was renovated in 1970–1980. Today, a woodcarving workshop is operating in it.

== Architecture ==
The madrasa was built in a complex layout (19.9x17.25 m) with a facade facing south. 2 wings are decorated with a bouquet-like patterns. There is an entrance to miyonsaray through the gable. A small courtyard (5.65x11.0 m) is surrounded by cells. Muqarnas were made on the mihrab of Baghali and the southern wall. The cells are slightly domed[4]. The entrance hall is covered with a dome and leads to the courtyard from this hall. Since the madrasah did not have a special study room, its function must have been fulfilled by only one large room on the southwest side.

== See also ==
- Matniyoz Devonbegi Madrasah
- Kutlugmurad Inak Madrasah
- Yusuf Yasovulboshi Madrasah
- Arab Muhammadkhan Madrasah
