= Musa Tora Madrasah =

Madrasa in Khiva, Khorazm, Uzbekistan

- Interactive map of the Musa Tora Madrasah area

General information
- Architectural style: Central Asian Architecture
- Location: 8, Boyochchilar Street, Itchan Kala, Khiva, Khorazm Region, Uzbekistan
- Year built: 1842
- Owner: State Property

Technical details
- Material: brick
- Floor area: 38.7 m × 28.2 m

Musa Tora Madrasah (or 'Muso Tora Madrasa) is an architectural monument in the city of Khiva, Khorazm Region of the Republic of Uzbekistan. Today, the madrasa is located at 8, Boyochchilar Street, "Itchan Kala" neighborhood, in the central part of Itchan Kala. The monument was built in 1841 at the expense of funds of Musa Tora, the grandson of Olloquli Khan.

By the decision of the Cabinet of Ministers of the Republic of Uzbekistan on October 4, 2019, the Musa Tora Madrasah was included in the national list of real estate objects of tangible cultural heritage and received state protection. Currently, the Itchan Kala state museum-reserve is state property based on the right of operational management.

== History ==
The Musa Tora madrasa was built on the southern side of the Konya Ark architectural monument, near the Yusuf Yasovulboshi Madrasah in the northern part of the center of Itchan Kala with its facade facing south. According to some sources, the madrasa was founded in 1841 by the order of Musa Tora (the word "tora" is added to the name of the descendants of the Khan dynasty), son of Rahmanquli Inoq, the grandson of Muhammad Rahim Khan I and the nephew of Olloquli Khan. Musa Tora died in 1885 in the battle against the Turkmen yomuts and was brought to Khiva and buried in this madrasa.

Today, a woodcarving school and a craft shop operate in the madrasa.

== Architecture ==
The madrasa was built in a trapezoidal layout when viewed from above, and its total area is 38.7 m × 28.2 m. The style of the back and two sides is simple, without decoration. The main pediment is typical of Khorezm architecture, it is covered with ceramic tiles, and the bricks are laid in a wavy pattern. The three-arched rooms on the two side wings were built lower than the pediment. The gate was decorated with wood carvings and there are inscriptions inside. It leads to the courtyard through a two-domed, articulated miyansarai. A mosque (6.0 m × 6.0 m) and a classroom (4.2 m × 4.2 m) are located next to miyansarai. The rooms around the courtyard (21.5 m × 4.28 m) are decorated with arched front rows, roofs with balky domes, the mosque, classroom and miyonsaray were decorated with arched domes, under the inner dome there are shield-shaped arches. There were written following words in the gate: "Musa Tora attained rank for a short time, then died in battle and went to Heaven. After his death, his mother built this madrasa in his memory" . The inscriptions were engraved in 1856, in the Arabic alphabet in the nastaliq style, and the poem was written by the poet Kamil Pahlavon Niyaz.

== See also ==
- Kutlugmurad Inak Madrasah
- Yusuf Yasovulboshi Madrasah
- Arab Muhammadkhan Madrasah
