= Ota Darvaza =

Western gate of the Itchan Kala

Ota Gate
- Ota darvoza (Uzbek)
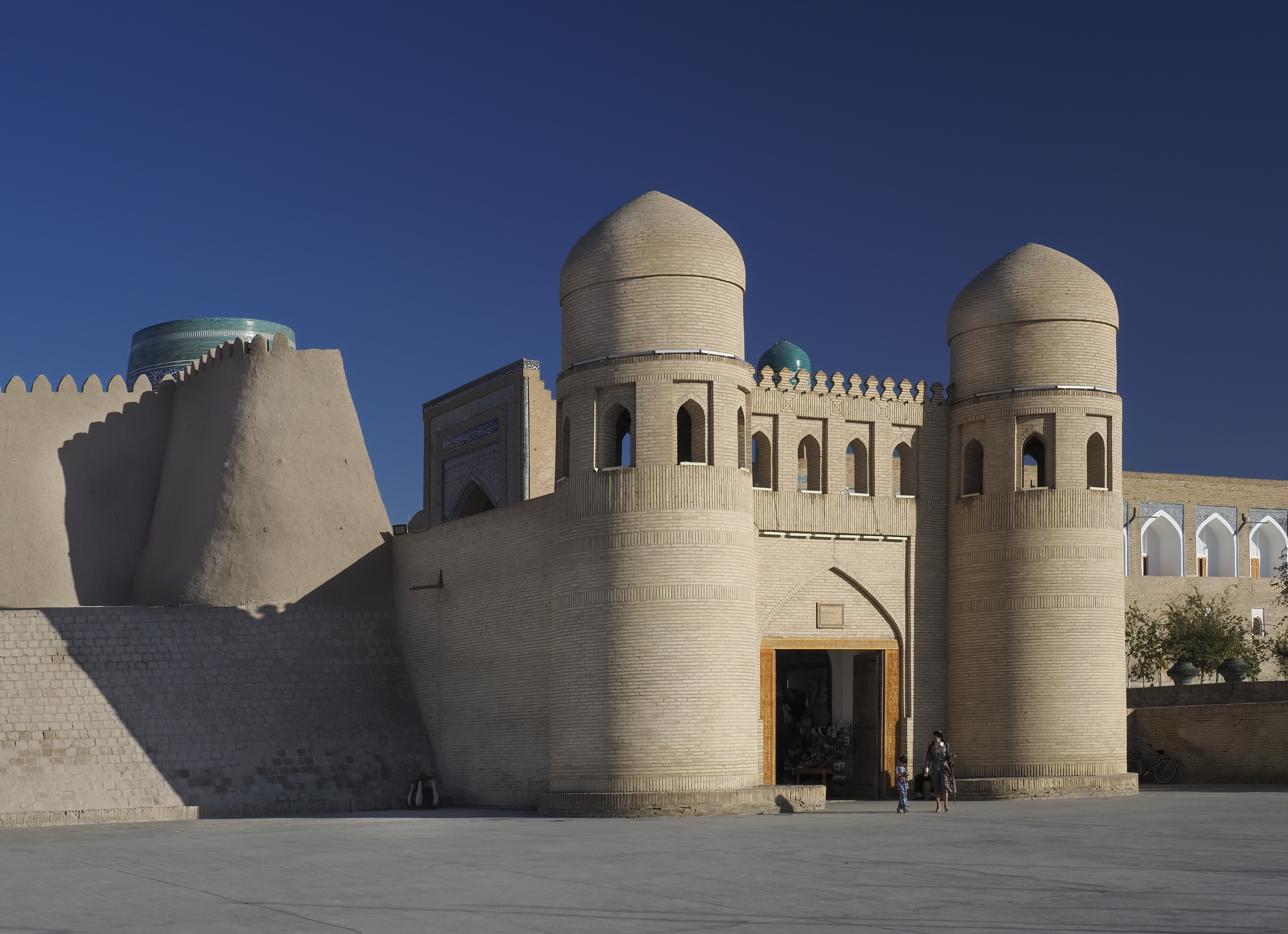
- West Gate of Itchan Kala, Khiva, Uzbekistan.
- Interactive map of Ota Gate
- 41.37859824937195°N 60.357101639944915°E
- Location: The city of Khiva
- Nearest city: Khiva

History
- Built for: Protection for the city of Khiva
- Demolished: 1920
- Rebuilt: 1975

Ota Gate (uzbek: Ota darvoza) is the western gate of the Itchan Kala, in the walled inner town of the city of Khiva, Uzbekistan. It was built during the reign of Olloqulixon in 1828-29 and is also known as the Shermuhammad Gate. The Ota Gatehas been included in the "List of Intangible Cultural Heritage of Humanity" by the Cabinet of Ministers of the Republic of Uzbekistan, recognizing its cultural significance. Additionally, it has been added to UNESCO's World Heritage List as part of the historical heritage of the city of Khiva, signifying its historical importance.

== History ==
The Ota Gate, located in the city of Khiva, was constructed during the reign of Olloqulixon in 1828–1829. Inside the gate, there were 13 market stalls and an open-air bazaar. On the right side of the gate, there is the Muhammad Amin Khan Madrasah, while on the left side, the old palace of the Khan is located.
City gates like the Ota Gate were part of the defensive system. As an example, they featured watchtowers on both sides of the passageway, and on top of the gate, there was an open square. Inside the gate, there were living quarters and a treasury (a place for collecting taxes), as well as a room for the gatekeeper. The size and structure of the gate were similar to other gates built during the 19th century in Khiva. The shape of the gate arches was designed to ensure the stability of the structure, taking into account the weight of the bricks. Layers of mud bricks were added to the arches. Small domes were constructed using the "davra" and "balxa" methods. Additionally, the inner part of the gate was equipped with plumbing. The original wooden doors of the Ota Gate have not survived, as they were removed in 1920. The gate was reconstructed based on archival materials from 1974 to 1978.

== Architecture ==
The Ota Gate features a rectangular gatehouse with a correct rectangular shape (17.50×15.40 m), and an elongated interior, topped by two large domes (with a diameter of 15.07 m). The interior of the gatehouse has an open corridor, and the domed rooms on top of the gate serve as the quarters for the gatekeepers. One of the rooms leads to a chamber, and from there, a spiral staircase descends to the ground. The gate's frontispiece is tall and adorned with two large floral patterns on each side. The pointed arches of the frontispiece have floral patterns and geometric designs, as well as eight-pointed star motifs within circular borders. On the right door, the Arabic verses "Surah Al-Ikhlas" and on the left door, the "Kalimah Shahada" – "La ilaha illallohu Muhammadur Rasululloh" are inscribed. However, these doors are not the original ones; they were previously installed in Muhammad Amin Bahadur Khan's Angarik Palace in Khiva, built between 1850 and 1851. In 1978, the gate was adapted for use as a store.

== See also ==
- Bogcha Gate
- Polvon Gate
- Tosh Gate
