= Abdullakhan Madrasah =

Abdullakhan Madrasah may refer to the following architectural monuments in Uzbekistan:

- Abdullakhan Madrasah (Bukhara), built 1587–1590
- Abdullakhan Madrasah (Khiva), built 1855 in Khorazm
