= Khorezmshakhs' Madrasah =

Madrasa in Khiva, Khorazm, Uzbekistan

- Interactive map of the Khorezmshakhs' Madrasah area

General information
- Architectural style: Architecture of Khorezm
- Location: 51, Mevaston Street, Mevaston neighborhood, Khiva, Khorazm Region, Uzbekistan
- Coordinates: 41.37941622937191°N 60.36467741447202°E
- Year built: 1915

References
- Xorazmshoxlar madrasasi xaritada

Khorezmshakhs' Madrasah is a cultural heritage object in Uzbekistan. The madrasa was built in 1915. It is at 51 Mevaston Street, Mevaston neighborhood, Khiva, Khorazm Region. According to the decision of the Cabinet of Ministers of the Republic of Uzbekistan No. 100 dated 24 February 2021 on additional measures for the development of domestic and pilgrimage tourism, the Khorezmshakhs Madrasah was included in the priority restoration program of cultural heritage objects used in tourism routes in 2021–2025. The madrasah is in possession of the Department of Cultural Heritage of Khorezm region.

== History ==
Khorezmshakhs' madrasa was built in 1915 on the territory of the Dishan Kala. Khorezmshahs' madrasah is now located near the market in Khiva. Khan of Khiva Asfandiyar Khan, who was killed by Junayd Khan's men in the Nurullabay's Palace located in the Dishan Kala, was buried in one of the rooms in the southwest corner of the madrasa. According to the rules of the Khanate, those who died in Dishan Kala were not buried in Itchan Kala, only those who died in Itchan Kala were buried here. Another room was built against the wall of the western facade of the madrasa, and according to the words of the public, this room was built for those who came to visit the grave of Asfandiyar Khan. During Asfandiyarkhan's lifetime, there was a tomb built by him for his mother, wife and for himself in the Pahlavon Mahmud complex located in the Itchan Kala, but nobody was buried in the two tombs until today due to the fact that the khan died outside of Itchan Kala.

== Architecture ==
The dimension of the madrasa are 28.4x24.4 meters. The height of the roof of the madrasa is 5.16 meters, the height of the dome is 11.52 meters, the size of the courtyard of the madrasa is 13.47 x 10.75 meters. The madrasa has 14 rooms with dome-shaped roofs. A well for drinking water was dug in the courtyard of the madrasa. Khorezmshahs' madrasah was built of bricks, the size of each brick is 26x26x5 centimeters. A mixture of ganch was used to make bricks. Madrasah is one-story. Khorezmshahs' madrasa was built in a different way from other madrasas in Khiva.
