= Abdurasulboy Madrasah =

Madrasa in Khiva, Khorazm, Uzbekistan

- Abdurasulboy madrasasi

General information
- Architectural style: Central Asian Style
- Location: 16, Pahlavon Mahmud Street,Itchan Kala, Khiva, Khorazm Region, Uzbekistan
- Year built: 1906
- Owner: State property. Khorezm Region Cultural Heritage Department on the basis of operational management rights

Technical details
- Material: brick

Design and construction
- Architect: Abdurasulboy (Komil Kharazmiy ugli)

Abdurasulboy Madrasah is a former madrasa in Khiva, Uzbekistan. It was built according to the order of Mirzabashi Abdurasulboy in 1906. In 1990, it was included in the list of UNESCO World Heritage Sites as a part of Itchan Kala. Currently, it is used as a sozana embroidery workshop and exhibition space.

== History ==
Abdurasulboy Madrasah was built in 1906 in the city of Khiva. The madrasah is located approximately two hundred meters south of the house where the owner, Abdurasulboy, was born and raised, and the mausoleum of Syed Alauddin next to his house. Abdurasulboy wrote poems under the pseudonym Purkomil. He is the brother of Muhammad Rasul Mirza, one of the influential ayans of Khiva Khanate, and the son of Kamil Khorazmi. A calligrapher, poet, musicologist and artist, Abdurasulboy worked as a governor in Gurlan district during the reign of Muhammad Rahimkhan II, and later as a mirzaboshi in the khan's cabinet. Established a cabinet under the name "Purkomil".

There is a poetic history written in nastaliq Turkish on the marble slab above the entrance to the Abdurasulboy madrasah. The master carved his name on the door frame: Practical Master Bog'bek. Abdurasulboy madrasah has different aspects from other madrasas, that is, after entering the building, there are bedrooms and rooms on the right side, and on the left side there is a mosque and a study room. Its general appearance is trapezoidal. The appearance of Abdurasulboy Madrasah is similar to Khojamberdibi madrasah, known as "Khurjun" madrasah in the vernacular.

== Architecture ==
The madrasah measures 30x65 meters, and has two courtyards. The entrance is located in the middle of two courtyards and consists of two parts connected to each other, one side facing the madrasah courtyard. Abdurasulboy's two daughters were buried in two rooms. In the two corners of the western courtyard (6.9x3.6 meters), there are two four-room rooms, a mosque with a dome roof in the south, and a room with two doors in the north. This courtyard is entered through a hall with windows on both sides. The eastern courtyard (7.1x5.5 meters) is also surrounded by cells. Some of the small rooms above the corridor, where students live, and other rooms are covered with domes. The walls are made of polished brick. Decorations are made of green tiles on the roof.

Currently, there is a workshop for hand-weaving silk threads using natural dyes in the Abdurasulboy madrasah.

== See also ==
Pahlavon Mahmud complex

== Literature ==
- OʻzME. Birinchi jild. Toshkent, 2000-yil
