= Poyanda Mausoleum =

- Polvon poyaki Mausoleum
- Interactive map of the Poyanda Mausoleum area

General information
- Location: 12 Pahlavon Mahmud Street, Itchan Kala, Khiva, Khorazm Region, Uzbekistan
- Coordinates: 41.38417401567539°N 60.35138167537259°E
- Year built: 16th century
- Owner: State Heritage

Technical details
- Material: brick

Poyanda Mausoleum (or Polvon Poyaki Mausoleum) is a mausoleum located in Khiva, Khorazm and known by the names of Poyanda and Poyaki among the inhabitants of the city. The mausoleum dates back to the 16th century, and today it is located at 12 Pahlavon Mahmud Street, "Itchan Kala" neighborhood, Khiva. The historical object "Itchan Kala" state museum-reserve belongs to the state property based on the right of operational management.

== Location and Etymology ==
There is a corridor between Pahlavon Mahmud mausoleum and Juma mosque, usually the worshipers entered the mosque after visiting this mausoleum. There was also a mausoleum with its facade facing east, between these two buildings.

The word Poyanda means firm, permanent. In the past, there was a neighborhood and a street with the same name in the city of Khiva. There were also inscriptions written on the tiles of this mausoleum with the name Poyanda (in some sources Polvon, also Poyaki). These records have not survived by this day.

In front of the Poyanda mausoleum, there was also a minaret belonging to the Pahlavon poyaki mosque. The minaret was destroyed during the Soviet period. The mosque is located very close to the mausoleum from the eastern side, and the Abdullakhan madrasah is located on its southern side.

In a document from the first half of the 19th century, it was mentioned that the Husayn poyaki Abdullah donated 100 gold pieces of Khorazm money for the mosque from the coin of the Alla-Kuli-Khan period. It is also known from the documents that many women patronized this building in their time.

Although the inscriptions written on the tiles of this mausoleum named Polvon Poyaki have been lost to this day, paper copies of these inscriptions have been preserved in the archive. From these records studied in the archive, it was determined that a reciter named Safojan was buried in the mausoleum.
