= Abdullakhan Madrasah (Khiva) =

Madrasa in Khiva, Khorazm, Uzbekistan

Abdullakhon Madrasah
- Uzbek: Abdullaxon Madrasasi
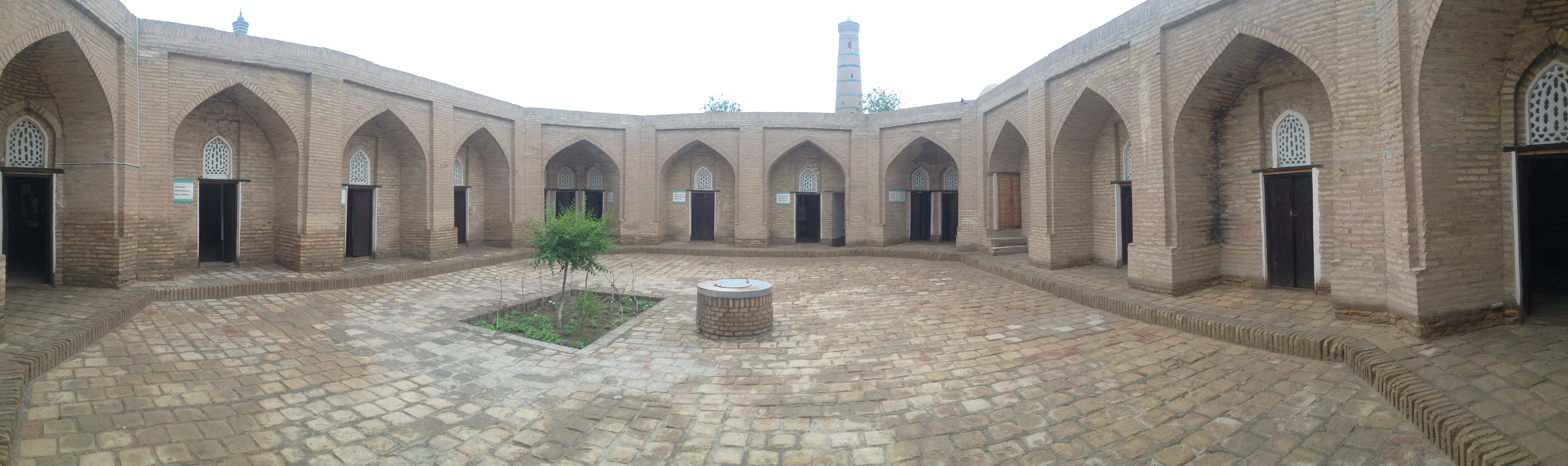

General information
- Type: Madrasah
- Architectural style: Central Asian architecture
- Location: Khiva, Uzbekistan, Itchan kala MFY, Street, 21-uy
- Coordinates: 41.377428°N 60.362228°E
- Construction started: 1855
- Owner: State property. Khorezm Region Cultural Heritage Department on the basis of operative management right

Technical details
- Material: Brick
- Size: two entrances, rectangular

Abdullakhan Madrasah is an architectural monument in Khiva. It is located between Olloquli Khan and Kutlugmurad Inak madrasas in Itchan Kala. It was built in memory of Abdulla Khan (brother of Khan of Khiva; Kutlugmurad Inak) by his mother after his death at age 17 in 1855 in a battle with Turkmen Yavmuts. It is located west of the White Mosque.

Currently, it is considered an object of cultural heritage of Uzbekistan. It is also a tourist service and exhibition facility, and is home to the Khorezm Museum of Nature, whose exhibition was first established in 1960. The last exposition of the museum took place in 2010.

After the death of Muhammad Amin Khan (1845–1855) in 1855, his son Abdullah Khan came to power in Khiva Khanate.

During the short reign of Abdullah Khan, who ruled for only six months, there was a fierce struggle with the nomadic tribes, as a result of which Abdullah Khan died in August 1855.

In Kamiljon Khudoyberganov's work "Khiva Khans Family Tree" Abdullah Khan is described as follows:

Abdulla Khan was a man of no words, and with the words of Mir Ahmad, he shed the blood of several innocents. He was in a hurry and impatient. But he was brave and valued friendship and justice. He did not have a son, but he had a daughter, who was married to Abdulaziz. After Abdullah Khan's death, his mother built a madrasah to preserve her son's name.

The building has two entrances and is rectangular in plan with corner towers running from east to west. At the entrance on the north side is the reception hall (mionsaray). Inside the madrasah is the domed building of the former mosque (on the south side), three rooms built instead of a classroom, and surrounding one-story rooms. Yard kept in good condition.

The courtyard is square (31.5x28.25 meters), and the corners are decorated with a bouquet of flowers - a minaret. Through a wide arched porch in the style of a head, it leads to the 3-domed mionsaray, and through it to the courtyard. The courtyard (18.9x14.0 meters) is surrounded by cells. The roof of the cells is covered with a balkhi dome. The domed mosque on the south side is connected to the Mion Palace. The size of the classrooms is 4.25x4.25 meters. The courtyard is entered from the west through a narrow passage. Currently, the madrasah houses the exposition "Museum of Nature".

Currently, an exposition of the Khorezm Nature Museum has been organized on the territory of the madrasah, and it is aimed at introducing the tourists and guests who visited the museum to the Khorezm oasis, its flora and fauna, relief, climate, and nature. The exhibition of the Khorezm nature department of the museum contains information about the fauna of the Sultan Vais mountains, the Amudarya delta, the Karakum and Kyzylkum deserts, and useful plant species. The exhibition space is 180 sq.m.

== See also ==
- Abdurasulboy Madrasah
- Muhammad Aminkhan Madrasah
- Matniyoz Devonbegi Madrasah
