= Sharifboy Madrasa =

Historical monument in Uzbekistan

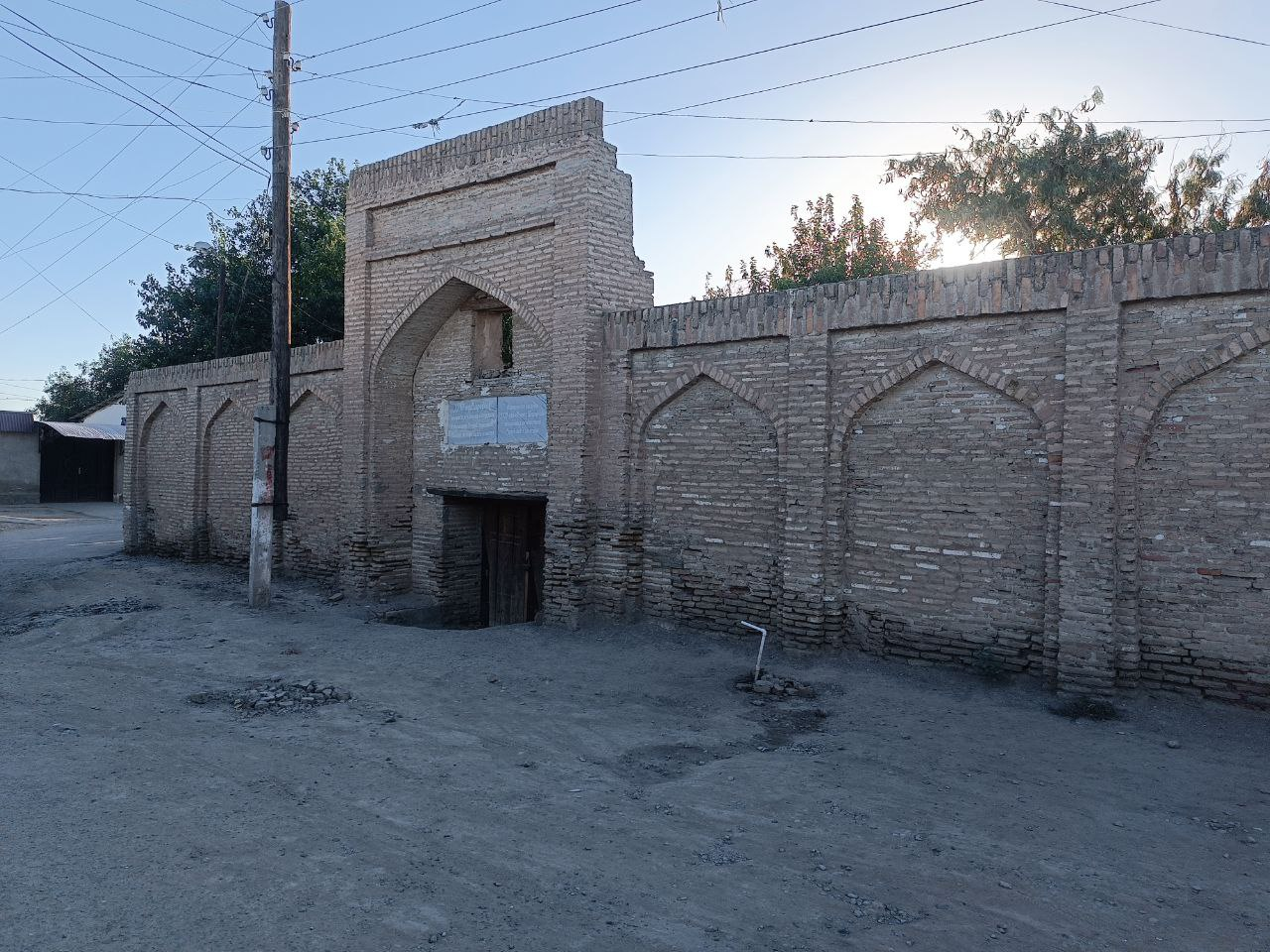
Sharifboy Madrasah

The Sharifboy Madrasa is a historical and cultural monument located in the Chaqar district of Qarshi, in the Qashqadaryo Region of Uzbekistan. The madrasa was included in the National Register of Immovable Property Objects of the Material and Cultural Heritage of Uzbekistan and placed under state protection by Presidential Decree No. PQ-4068, "On measures to radically improve the activities in the field of preservation of material and cultural heritage objects", dated December 19, 2018.

== History ==
Sharifboy madrasa was built in the early 18th century. According to the information, Sharifboy madrasa was founded about 300 years ago by Sharofkhoja and he himself taught at the madrasa until the end of his life.

Sharifboy madrasa has experienced many events in the past three centuries. In particular, during the Soviet rule, the madrasa was used for completely different purposes. For example, first it was a cultural house, then a club, and also a venereal diseases dispensary. Today, the madrasa is in a dilapidated condition and stands in the courtyard of Chaqar district. Chaqar mosque and Sharifboy madrasa were included in the national register by the Decree of the Cabinet of Ministers No. 846 dated October 4, 2019 "On approval of the National Register of Immovable Property Objects of the Material and Cultural Heritage". However, due to the lack of repair and restoration works at Sharifboy madrasa and Chaqar mosque, there were critical discussions on social networks in 2022. According to them, the condition of the madrasa reached an emergency state.

== Architecture ==
The architectural style of the madrasa is similar to that of Shermuhammad madrasa, but it is one-story, without domes, made of adobe bricks, with low arches and no decorations.

The size of the madrasa is 22.15 meters in length and 19.61 meters in width. The courtyard is rectangular in shape and measures 9.0x12.31 meters. The courtyard is paved with adobe bricks. There are 14 cells, mostly one-room, as well as a lecture hall and a veranda on the south side, which was mainly used as a summer school. Later, the front of this veranda was closed and it was turned into a neighborhood mosque.

== See also ==
- Qilichboy Madrasa
- Muhammad Amin Inoq Madrasa
- Mozori Sharif Madrasa
