= Qilichboy Madrasa =

Madrasa in Qarshi, Uzbekistan

Coordinates: 38.8694°N 65.8056°E

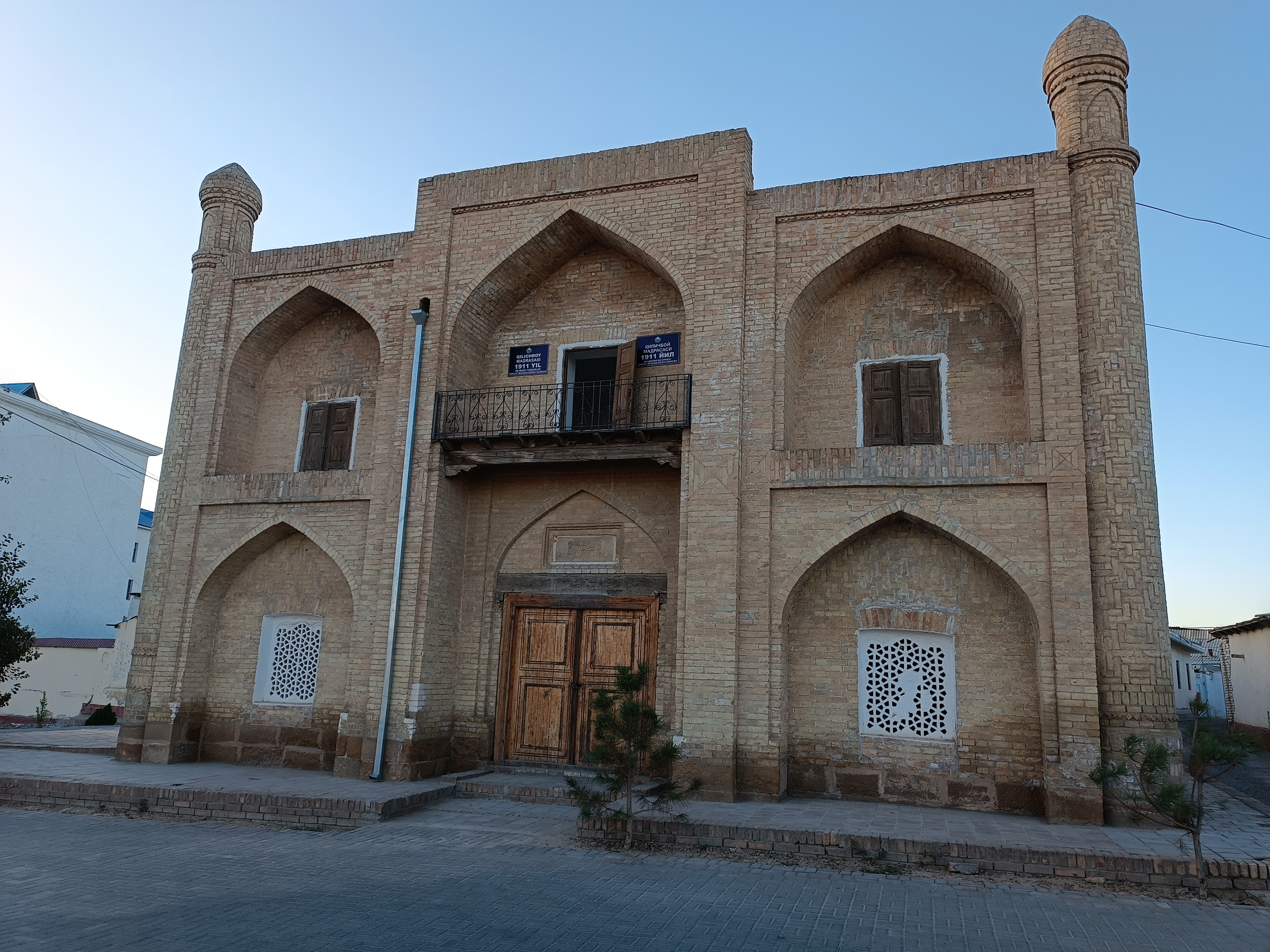
Qilichboy Madrasa

The Qilichboy Madrasa (other names: Qilichbek Madrasa) is an architectural monument (19th century) located in Qarshi city, Uzbekistan. This madrasa is considered one of the well-preserved historical buildings in the city. It is under state protection. It is included in the national register of immovable objects of the material and cultural heritage of Uzbekistan. Qilichboy Madrasa is not a very large building, and its structure resembles that of Khoja Abdul Aziz Madrasa. These two madrasas are located close to each other.

The building is located in the park called Odina Park in the modern Qarshi city.

== Construction ==
Qilichboy Madrasa was built in 1914 during the reign of Said Olimkhan with the efforts of a rich and influential person named Qilichboy. Master Sharof Bukhari participated in the construction of the building.

In some sources, it is also written that the mausoleum was built in 1911.

== Structure ==
The madrasa is 12.5 meters long and 13 meters wide. The courtyard is octagonal in shape. The courtyard area is 6 x 7 meters. A pool is built in the middle of the courtyard. The portal side of the building is two-storied. There are dome-shaped arches on the side of the portal.

There are eleven classrooms in Qilichboy Madrasa. The building consists of two floors. There is also a sewage system in the courtyard. The walls and dome of the madrasa are made of carved wood.

The structure of the mausoleum is similar to the style of Bek Mir Qazaq Madrasa. However, it is relatively small in size.

Today, Qilichboy Madrasa operates as a museum.

== Activity ==
Qilichboy Madrasa served as a school for young students from nearby areas in the first years.

From 1925 to 1938, this institution was used as a prison. The Jadids, writers, and ordinary people who were captured in Kashkadarya and nearby regions were interrogated and imprisoned here. The teachers and students of the madrasa were also arrested. In 1938, the prisoners were transferred to another place, and the madrasa started to operate only as a prison. In 1950, teachers and ordinary people who were relocated from various regions of the USSR started to live here.

== Renovation ==
In 2021, the madrasa was renovated by the cultural heritage administration and a library and museum were established in this area. The museum and library are affiliated with the Golden Heritage Foundation.

== See also ==
- Sharifboy Madrasa
- Muhammad Amin Inoq Madrasa
- Mozori Sharif Madrasa
