= Muhammad Amin Inoq Madrasa =

Madrasa in Khiva, Khorazm, Uzbekistan

Coordinates: 41°22′42″N 60°21′38″E

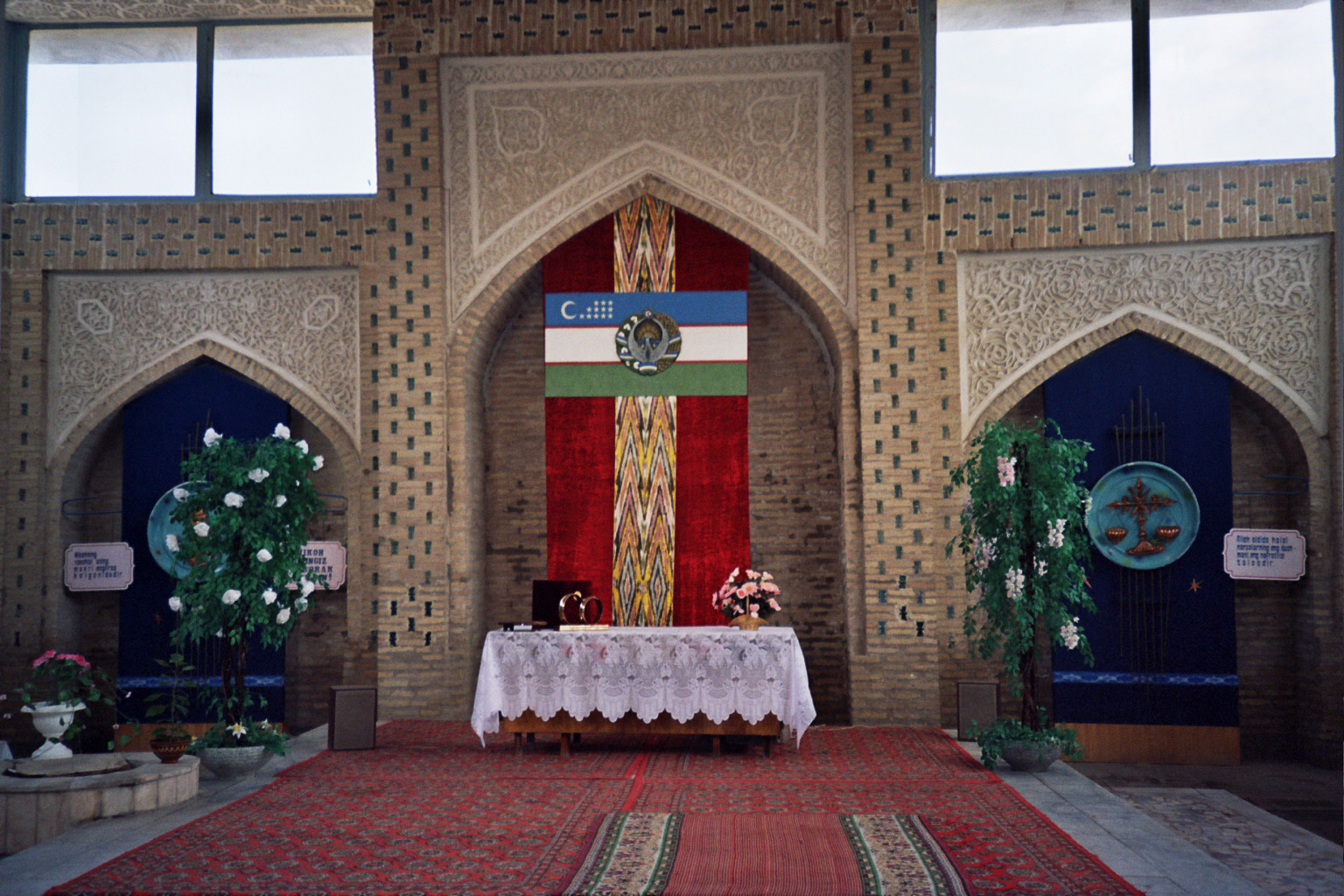
Muhammad Amin Inoq Madrasa

The Muhammad Amin Inoq Madrasa is an architectural monument in Khiva city of Khorezm region of the Republic of Uzbekistan. The madrasa dates back to the 18th century (1785) and is currently located in the “Ichan qal’a” quarter, Zargarlar street, house 34. It was built by Muhammad Amin inoq and stood out in the center of Ichan qal’a.

Muhammad Amin inoq madrasa was included in the National Register of Immovable Cultural Heritage Objects by the Resolution of the Cabinet of Ministers of the Republic of Uzbekistan on October 4, 2019, and was taken under state protection. Currently, it is considered as state property on the basis of the operational management right of the “Ichan qal’a” State Museum-Reserve.

== History and architectural style ==
This madrasa was built in 1785 by Muhammad Amin inoq, who was the first Khiva khan from the Qongirot dynasty and based on the genealogy of this dynasty. According to legends, one of the special rooms of this madrasa was buried by Muhammad Amin inoq and his son.

In 1935, several historical buildings of Khiva were destroyed, and according to the craftsmen who worked at that time, two graves were found inside the madrasa. The bodies in the graves were well preserved and they were additionally wrapped in leather in the coffin. The madrasa has more than 20 cells, and its front side is two-storied from the entrance and has special stairs on both sides for lifting up.

In front of the historical madrasa, Fozilbiy mosque was also built in the early 19th century (Fozilbiy was Amir al-umaro, the commander-in-chief of the military forces of the Khiva Khanate during the reign of Muhammad Amin inoq, his salary was 500 tillas per year, this building has now been destroyed). The madrasa was renovated and the upper part of its inner surface was reinforced with concrete columns and plastered, which helped to reflect modernity and history at the same time.

The madrasa has a main facade facing the square. The courtyard (25.4x24 m) is entered through a portal with three domes from the southern portal. Around the courtyard there are one-story cells and 2 verandas facing each other. From the cut corners of the courtyard there are curved passages to enter the cells. The portal is made in a style that is not typical for Central Asian architecture. Its domes are connected by gaps. The western one is larger in size and serves as a veranda. It leads to the domed hall of the mosque. On the 2 wings of the portal there are one-story, 2-row cells and turrets, a classroom and a mosque at the corners.

Currently, the Muhammad Amin inoq madrasa is house of registration of marriages.

== See also ==
- Qilichboy Madrasa
- Sharifboy Madrasa
- Mozori Sharif Madrasa
