= Said Mahruyjan Complex =

- aid Muhammad Mokhiroi Complex, Sayyid Mohiroi Jahan Complex
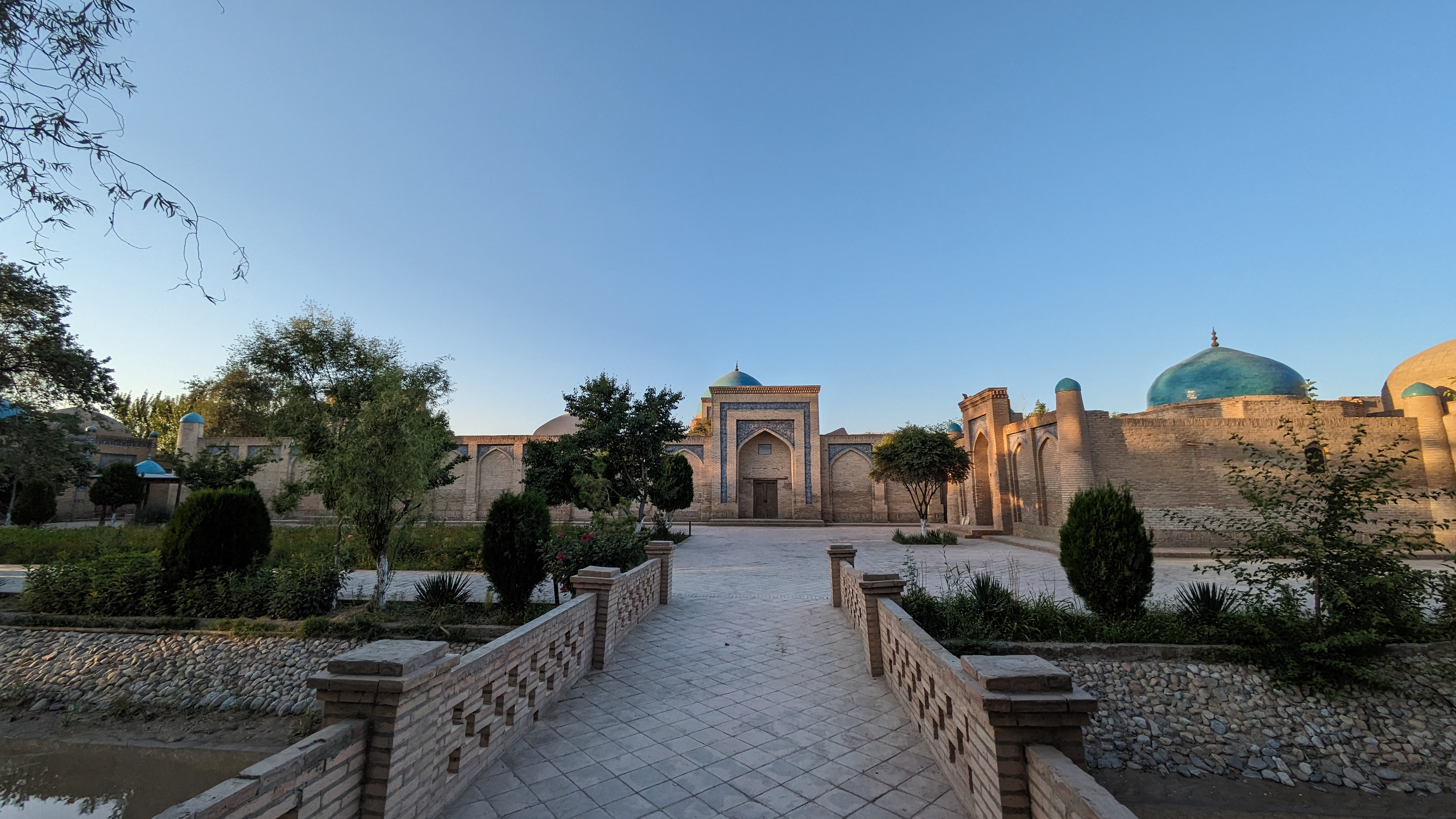
- Interactive map of the Said Mahruyjan Complex area

General information
- Architectural style: Central Asian Architecture
- Location: 84 Amir Temur Street, "Mevaston" neighborhood, Khiva, Khorazm Region, Uzbekistan
- Year built: 1884
- Renovated: 2008–2009
- Owner: State Property

Technical details
- Material: baked brick
- Floor area: 40.0x53.0 m

Said Mahruyjan Complex (or Said Muhammad Mokhiroi Complex, Sayyid Mohiroi Jahan Complex) is an architectural monument in the Khiva city, Khorazm Region of the Republic of Uzbekistan. The complex consists of a madrasa, a monastery, etc. built in 1884 around the tomb of Said Muhammad Mahruyjan. Today it is located at 84, Amir Temur Street, "Mevaston" neighborhood.

By the decision of the cabinet of the Republic of Uzbekistan on 4 October 2019, the complex was included in the national list of real estate objects of tangible cultural heritage and received state protection. Currently, it belongs to the state and is given to the charitable public fund "Waqf" on the basis of the operative management rights of the Khorezm Region Culture Department with a free use contract.

== History ==
The Said Mahruyjan complex was built on the territory of the "Chadirli Eshon" cemetery. In 1884, near the mausoleum built on the grave of Said, according to the order of the Khan of Khiva at that time, Muhammad Rahim Khan II (Feruz), the complex was erected in its current form.

2 madrasahs, a mosque, a shrine and a mausoleum have been preserved in the territory of the complex. Madrasas were built by Said Muhammad Khan and Muhammad Rahim Khan II. There is the mausoleum of Said Islamkhoja to the right of the entrance to the complex. Said Mahruyjan was buried in a small domed mausoleum inside the madrasa, and a large domed room can be accessed from the shrine in front of the madrasa. The graves of Said Muhammad Khan (1821–1864), Muhammad Rahim Khan II (1845–1910) and his grandson Temurgozi Tora are also located there

The complex was completely renovated in 2008–2009, and the tiling and decoration works, which were planned and not implemented during the khanate period, were also completed.

== Architecture ==
Said Mahruyjan madrasa has an area of 40.0x53.0 m, and is adjacent to 2 small madrasas (small Mahruyjan), a shrine and a small Mahruyjan mausoleum (11.0x14.1 m) from the west. The large courtyard is entered from the south through a 3-domed miyonsarai. Instead of the traditional classroom and mosque in the corners of the madrasa, there are cells and additional rooms. The front of the cells is arched. The mausoleum of Said Mahruyjan was built inside the courtyard in the north of the madrasa. Master B. Voisov beautifully decorated the scrolls of Muhammad Rahim II and Temurghazi with tiles. In the southeast of the complex, around the inner courtyard, there is a mosque with six domes, a gatehouse, a shrine, a mausoleum and cells. The mosque and the mausoleum (36.0x35.0 m) have a square dome, and the rooms have a balkhi dome. There are 2 large and 3 small rooms in the west of the complex.
