= Dost Alam Madrasah =

Madrasa in Khiva, Khorazm, Uzbekistan

- Interactive map of the Dost Alam Madrasah area

General information
- Type: Madrasah
- Architectural style: Central Asian architecture
- Location: 26, Zargarlar Street,, Khiva, Khorezm, Uzbekistan
- Coordinates: 41°22′43″N 60°21′38″E
- Owner: State property. "Ichan Qala" state museum-reserve on the basis of operational management rights

Design and construction
- Architect: Qalandar Koʻchim

Dost Alam madrasah is an architectural monument in Khiva, Khorezm region of the Republic of Uzbekistan. This historical object, located within the architectural monument of Itchan Kala, was built in 1882. Today, it is located at "Itchan Kala" MFY, 26, Zargarlar Street.

On October 4, 2019, by the decision of the Cabinet of Ministers of the Republic of Uzbekistan, the Dost Alam madrasah was included in the national list of immovable property objects of tangible cultural heritage and received state protection. Currently, the "Itchan Kala" state museum-reserve is state property based on the right of operational management.

== History ==
The madrasah was completed at the personal expense of Dost Alam, who served in the palace of Khan of Khiva-Muhammad Rahim Khan II. Judges were usually educated in the madrasah. The madrasah is located in the middle of the city near the Arab Muhammadkhan Madrasah and was built at the end of the 20th century. This madrasah has a rectangular shape with minarets at the corners, with the main gable facing west.

This one-story, small building appears to be a rectangular shape when viewed from above. The construction of this madrasah was supervised by Haj Khudoybergan, and Qalandar Kochim was the master. Currently, a wood carving shop is operating in the madrasah. Yusuf Bayani mentioned about this madrasah that "Dost A'lam built a madrasah".

== News about letting ==
In 2018, it was said that 11 objects on the balance sheet of the State Inspection for the Protection and Use of Cultural Heritage Objects of Khorezm Region can be rented. Among them is the Dost Alam madrasah, which is estimated to require an investment of at least 170 million soums. At the same time, it is reported that the madrasah is in a state of repair.
