= Olloqulixon Madrasa =

Madrasa in Khiva, Khorazm, Uzbekistan

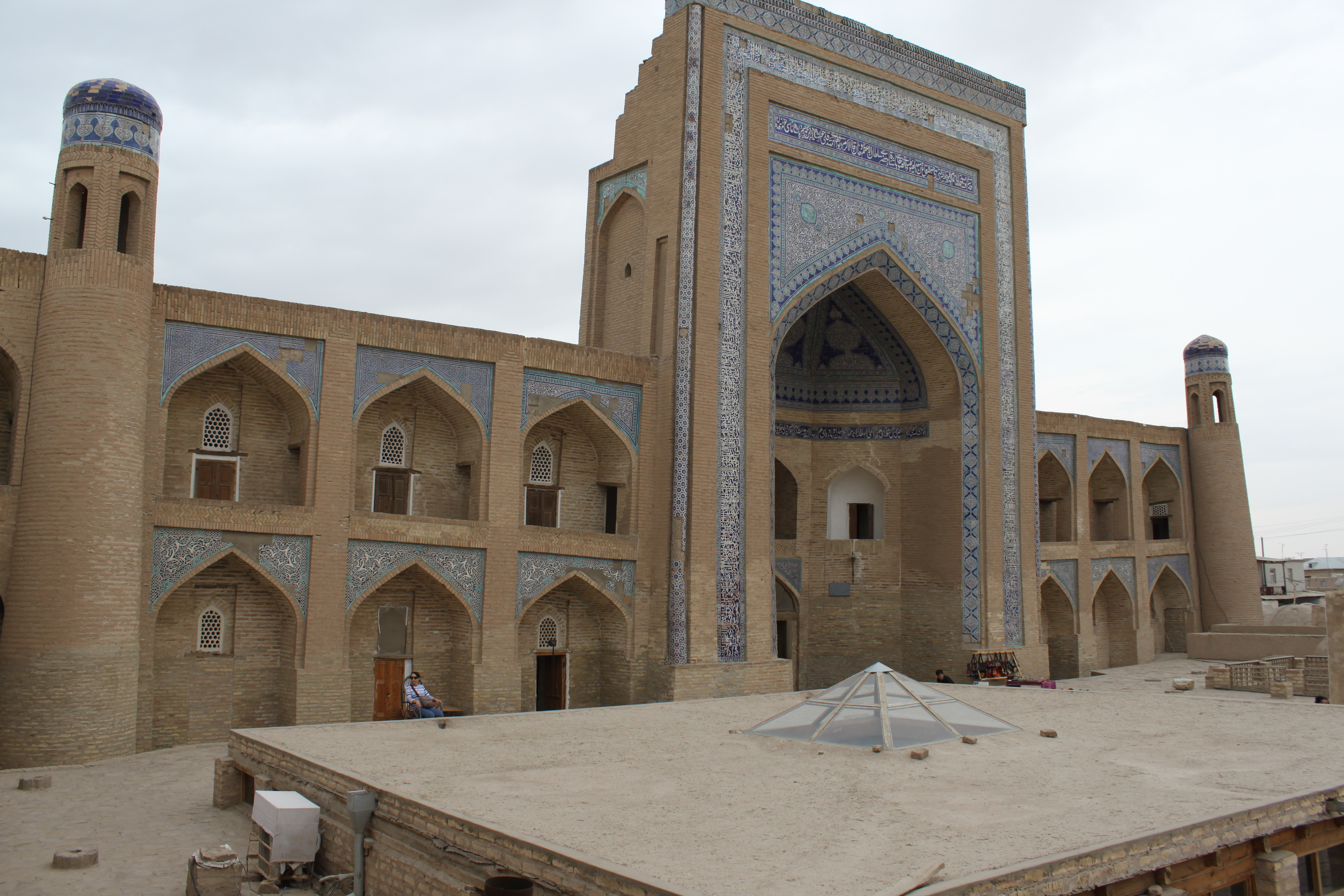
- Interactive map of the Olloqulixon Madrasa area

General information
- Architectural style: Central Asian architecture
- Location: Ichan Kala, Zargarlar Street, 33-house, Khiva, Uzbekistan
- Coordinates: 41.383°N 60.367°E1
- Year built: 1834-1835
- Completed: 1835
- Owner: State property. Khorezm Region Cultural Heritage Administration

Technical details
- Material: Brick
- Size: 62.45x47.0 m
- Floor count: 2

The Olloqulixon Madrasa or Alla Kouli Khan Madrasa is an architectural monument in Khiva (1834–35). The construction of the madrasa is related to the historical development of the ensemble near the Itchan Kala. The madrasa is located in the eastern part of the Itchan Kala. It is built in the style of a double madrasa, connected with the Ollo-qulixon Tim, the Khojamberdibiy Madrasa, and the Polvon Gate. The Olloqulixon Madrasa is built on an artificial hill (3 m high), which makes it look taller than the neighboring buildings.

== History ==
The Olloqulixon Madrasa was built in 1834-1835 by the order of Olloqulixon (Alla Kouli Khan), near the caravanserai. During his reign in Khiva, Olloqulixon built buildings such as the caravanserai, the tim, the Oqmasjid, and the Saidboy Mosque. The madrasa has 99 rooms (some sources say 90 rooms) and two mosques (winter and summer), a lecture hall, and a corridor at the entrance. Each room has a window and a door, and the walls of the madrasa are plastered with gypsum. The interior of the rooms is not decorated with any ornaments. That is, there are no special decorations and large domes inside the madrasa and the mosque. The walls are flat, and the niches are deep. All the decorations are on the outer walls of the building.

The Olloqulixon Madrasa was one of the major educational centers of its time. Students of different nationalities studied at the madrasa. Many of the students were Kazakhs and Turkmens, because the teachers of the madrasa were Kazakh and Turkmen masters. The madrasa had a library. The Khiva Khan Olloquli provided the students with the necessary literature and also donated the income from the nearby Tim and Caravanserai as additional waqf property for the madrasa library. There are sources that say that Olloqulixon allocated 8500 tanob (about 9 thousand hectares) of land in the territory of the Khiva Khanate for the waqf of this madrasa. The inscription of the Fath surah of the Quran in a complex suls script is carved on the portal of the madrasa.

The Khiva city library was located in the Olloqulixon Madrasa and all the students of the madrasa used it. The madrasa has been restored and now houses a handicraft center.

== Architecture ==
The madrasa has a rectangular plan (62.45x47.0 m), with the portal facing west. The main composition consists of a mosque, a mihrab, and a lecture hall, as well as two-story rooms. The date of construction of the building is preserved in the inscription above the door. The courtyard (34.6x29.4 m) has a unique feature, with a single row of two-story rooms on top of the small domes of the Polvon Gate and partly on the edge of the tim domes. The structure of the mosque and the lecture hall (4.8x4.8 m) is the same. They are covered with a semi-circular flat dome. The deep niches on the walls make the room look wider. The ayvan (5.5x5.5 m) is located on the west side of the madrasa, and the mihrab is decorated with ganch muqarnas in the “Iraqi” style. Each room (99) has a door and windows on the ceiling. The winter mosque and lecture hall in the madrasa are covered with a semi-circular flat dome. The portal of the mosque is decorated with circular patterns.
