= Muzrobshoh Khorezmi Mausoleum =

Mausoleum of Muzrobshoh Khorezmi
- Muzrobshoh Xorazmiy maqbarasi
- Interactive map of the Mausoleum of Muzrobshoh Khorezmi area
- Alternative names: Shahbaba, Hazrat Shah, Shahpir
- Etymology: From the name of Muzrobshoh, a state and religious figure of Khorezm

General information
- Type: Mausoleum
- Architectural style: Khorezmian
- Location: Oybek mahalla, Mukhaman village, Khazarasp district, Khorezm region, Uzbekistan
- Named for: Muzrobshoh Khorezmi
- Year built: 16th-18th centuries

Technical details
- Material: Brick
- Size: 7.3x8.3 meters

The Muzrobshoh Khorezmi Mausoleum (Uzbek: Muzrobshoh Xorazmiy maqbarasi) is an architectural monument of the 16th–18th centuries, located in the Mukhaman village, Khazarasp district, Khorezm region of Uzbekistan.

== History ==
The mausoleum is named after Muzrobshoh, a state and religious figure who lived in Khorezm and dates back to the 16th–18th centuries.

The name of the mausoleum is associated with the name of a state and religious figure, the ruler of Khorezm - Abu Mukharram Muhammad Muzrobshoh, who lived in the 8th century. Muzrobshoh was born in 705, in a family of a tanner and died in 775. King Muzrobshoh Khorezmi was the first ruler of Khazarasp and made the city of Khazarasp his capital in 745–775. As a result of the research of orientalists Abdulla Akhmedov, Rozimboy Ollayorov and the chief imam-khatib of the region Khairulla Abdullaev, it is known that Muzrobshoh Khorezmi was a companion of Abu Muslim. According to the narration, Muzrobshoh was an experienced military leader, defender of Islam, humanist and loyal friend.

Muzrobshoh Khorezmi was buried in the main cemetery of the city of Khazarasp and is revered by the people as a saint. The mausoleum is also known by the names "Shahbaba", "Hazrat Shah" and "Shahpir". It is believed that a three-time visit to the shrine of Muzrobshoh will free the pilgrim from enemies and from severe pain. It is also said that young people who visit Shahpir in a good mood will be blessed. In particular, it is said that if a young man who wants to learn a craft visits Shahpir, he will soon learn, master it and start earning well.

== Architecture ==
The mausoleum, built over the grave of Muzrobshoh Khorezmi, was damaged over time. A new mausoleum was built on the same place in the middle of the 17th century, that is, in 1655 by the order of Khan Abulgazi.

The monument is a single-chamber portal-dome tomb with strongly developed vertical forms of the peshtak and columnar mausoleum. The size of the mausoleum is 7.3 x 8.3 meters, the tomb is 4.9 x 4.9 meters. The mausoleum is distinguished by an unusually developed portal of the Khorezmian type, very elongated upwards, narrowing upwards in width and thickness, with preserved arcature. Expressive, upward portals with lush two-tier arcatures are characteristic of the Khazarasp district. The quadrangle of the tomb is derived with a recess from the lower prismatic base; in the upper third, the corners of the quadrangle are beveled, which corresponds to the tier of arched sails, with honeycomb stalactites in the filling of the arched grooves. From the masonry of the walls, at different heights, console beams protrude - the remains of uncut construction forests. The facade is made in a style typical for Khorezmian architecture: the entrance has a deep arch, small arches are made on the sides and above. In the language of the local population, this mausoleum is called "Shohpir Kadamjosi".

Currently, there is a cemetery around the mausoleum, and on its kibla, that is, the south side, there is a mosque with a capacity of 2000 believers.
