= Arab Muhammadkhan Madrasah =

Madrasa in Khiva, Khorazm, Uzbekistan

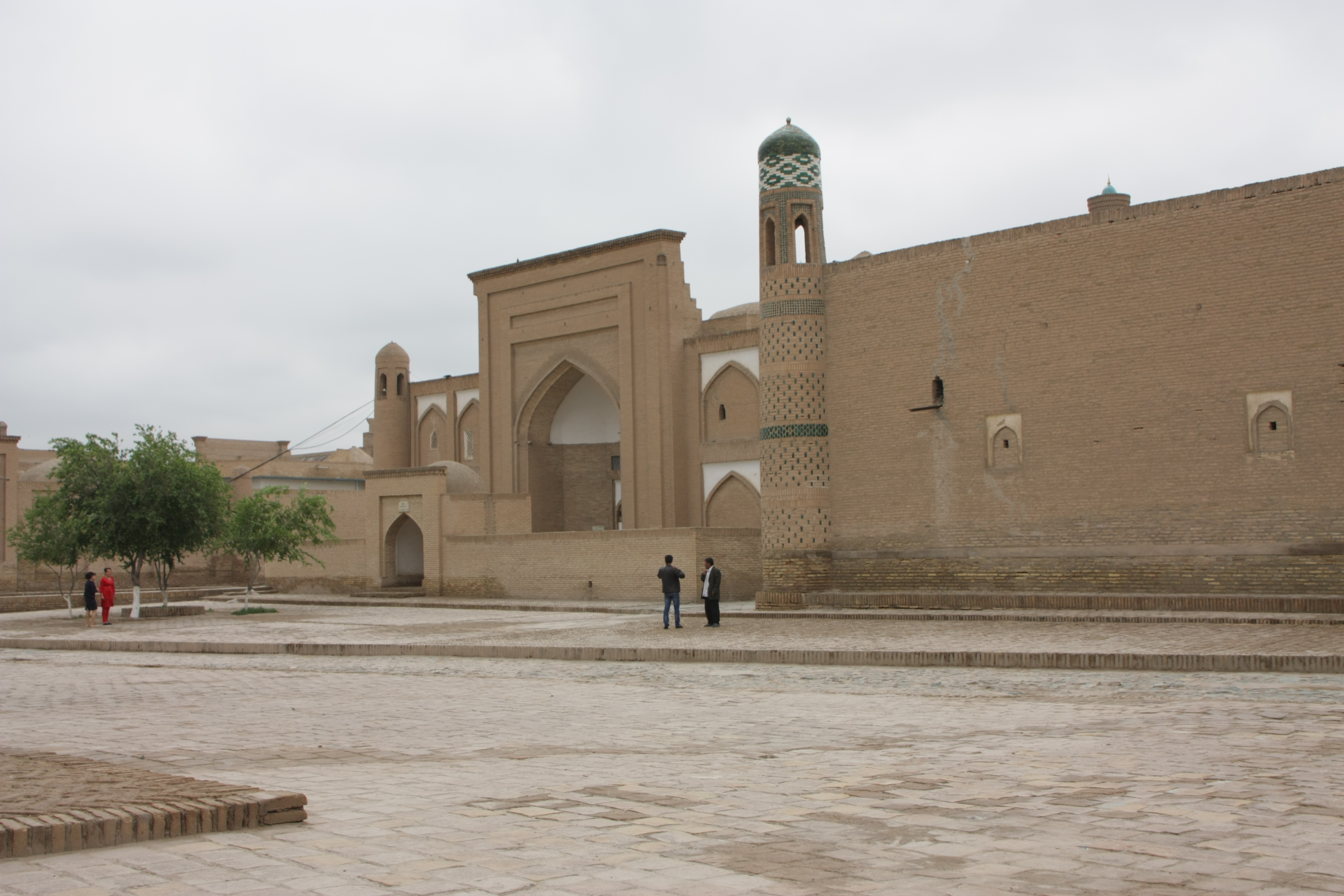
- Interactive map of the Arab Muhammadkhan Madrasah area

General information
- Location: at 27 Zargarlar Street, Ichan-Kala neighborhood, Khiva, Uzbekistan
- Coordinates: 41°22′42″N 60°21′37″E
- Year built: 1616
- Renovated: 1838
- Owner: State property

Technical details
- Material: brick, wood, straw
- Floor count: 2

Arab Muhammadhan Madrasah (or Madrasah of Arab Khan) is an architectural monument, part of Itchan Kala, in Khiva, Khorazm Region, Uzbekistan. Today, the monument is located at 27 Zargarlar Street, Itchan-Kala neighborhood.

By the decision of the Cabinet of Ministers of the Republic of Uzbekistan on 4 October 2019, the Arab Muhammadkhan madrasah was included in the national list of real estate objects of cultural heritage and received state protection. Currently, madrasah is considered the state property within "Ichan Kala" state museum-reserve.

== History ==
Arab Muhammadkhan madrasah was built in the back of Muhammad Rahim Khan II (Feruz) madrasah. It was originally built in 1616 with the funds and decree of Arab Muhammad Khan, who was the eleventh representative of the Uzbek dynasty of Arabshahis and was the khan of Khiva in 1602–1621. The madrasa was restored by Allakuli Khan in 1838 when the capital of Khiva Khanate transferred from Urganch to the city of Khiva and became the first madrasah built after the change of the capital.
After its completion in 1616, the madrasah was also called "Chobin madrasah" among the population. The wall of the madrasa was rebuilt from wood, raw bricks were laid inside and plastered with straw. According to population of Khiva, building a house in this way is called a "Nigirik" (frame) house. When the madrasa became old and in need of repair in the 19th century during the reign of Allakuli Khan, the khan rebuilt it with two floors of baked bricks. Madrasah was built in the centre of the Itchan Kala, not far from the Muhammad Amin Khan madrasah. This monument is one of the oldest among other architectural monuments of Khiva. Therefore, the madrasa attracts many tourists.

== Architecture ==
Since the madrasah was intended for the education of the people of Khiva, Arab Muhammad Khan built this madrasa initially as a one-story, simple, and trapezoidal structure. The luxuriously decorated madrasah porch is preserved in the Khiva Museum. During the reign of Allakuli Khan, the madrasah was rebuilt with a murabba, gable and dome. Head-style mosques and rooms are two-story and have flower bouquets in both corners. The rooms on the other sides are single-story. A mosque was built with porch in the yard of madrasah.

The monument has been restored and repaired several times. It took its current form during the reign of Khiva Khan Allakulikhan. Currently, only the main facade of the madrasa building is two-story, and the other three facades are one-story. It consists of a hall, a classroom and a mosque, and a courtyard surrounded by one-story rooms.

== See also ==
- Musa Tora Madrasah
- Yusuf Yasovulboshi Madrasah
- Khojash Mahram Madrasah
- Matpanoboy Madrasah
- Ulugbek Madrasah (Gijduvan)
