= Dishan Kala =

- Dishan Qal'a (Uzbek)
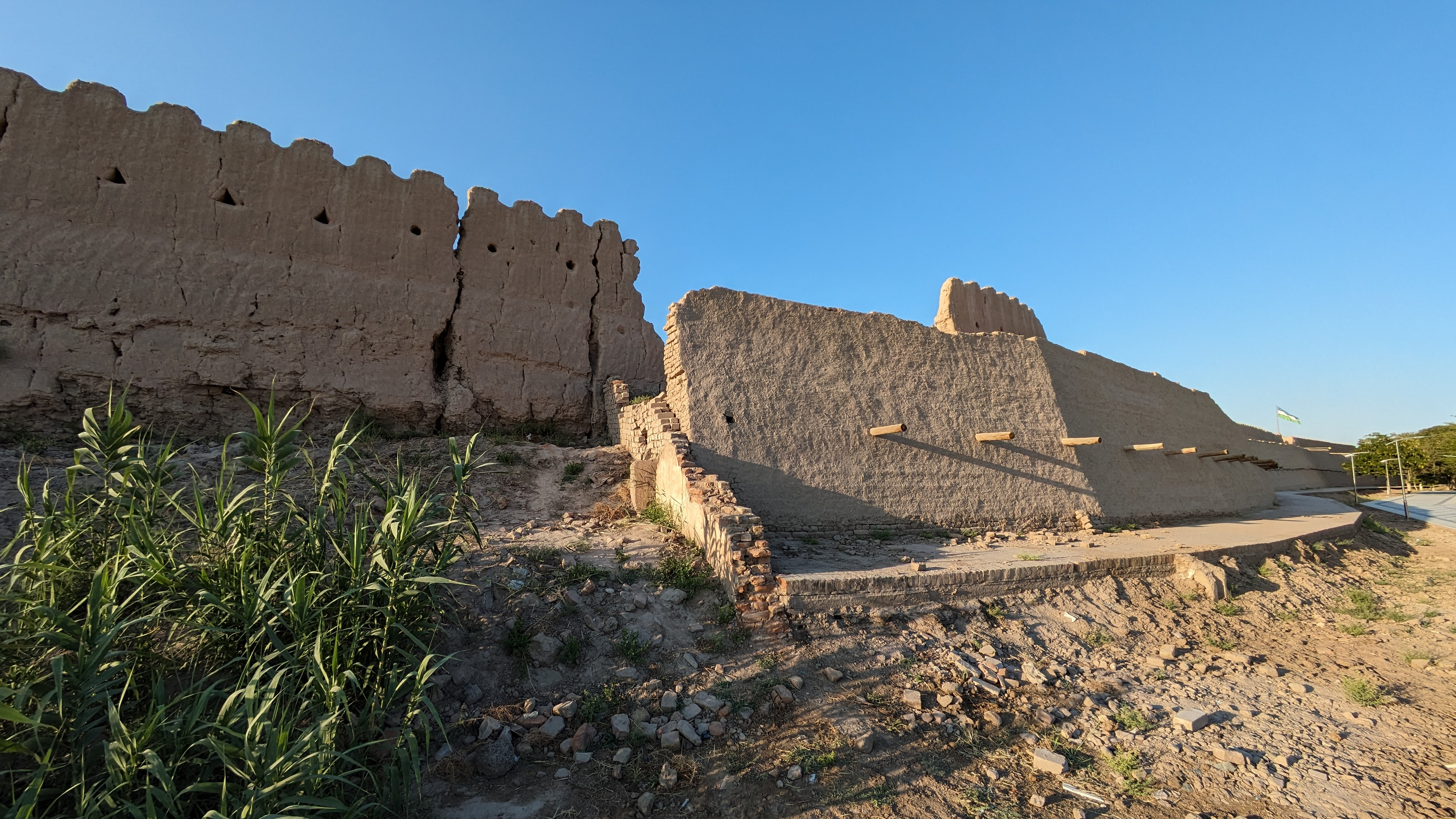
- The wall of Dishan Kala
- Interactive map of Dishan Kala
- 41°22′40″N 60°21′40″E
- Type: Fortress
- Location: Khiva, Uzbekistan

History
- Built: 1842

Site notes
- Area: 240 ha
- Architectural style: Islamic
- Governing body: Ministry of Culture and Sports of Uzbekistan

The Dishan Kala (translation: Outer Fortress, Uzbek: Dishan Qal’a) is a part of the citadel of Khiva. It was built by Khiva khan Allahquli Khan in 1842 to protect Khiva from external attacks. The construction involved a lot of people and the fortress was completed in 6 weeks. The wall (length 6250 meters, height 7–8 meters, wall thickness 5–6 meters) surrounded the fortress. Dishan Kala had 10 gates.
The main streets of Dishan Kala (Hazorasp, Bogi Shamol, Shohimardon, Qosh) have preserved many monuments such as Nurullaboy Palace, Sayidboy Madrasah and Mosque, Sayid Mohi Rui Jahan, Toʻrt Shabboz, Abdolbobo Complexes. Dishan Kala now has administrative and residential buildings, courtyards.

== History ==
Allahquli Khan built an outer defensive fortress in 1842 to protect Khiva from the attacks of the Yomuts (one of the Turkmen tribes). According to the poet and translator Ogahi, Allahquli Khan forced all his servants to work for free for 12 days a year and built the walls of Dishan Kala in 3 years. More than 200 thousand people participated in the construction of the wall. The soil for the construction was dug out two kilometers north of the city, in an area called Govukkol. There is now a large lake there.

== Architecture ==
Dishan Kala was built of baked bricks. Along the wall, there were semicircular towers every 30 meters, with a walkway about 1.5–2 meters wide on the upper part. There were loopholes on the top of the walls for archers to shoot arrows. The defense system included canals filled with water. All the gates were closed at night. The towers were built 4–5 meters ahead of the wall to monitor the surroundings. When danger arose, the guards lit fires and signaled to each other. The fortress had ten gates named Hazorasp (Sheep), Pishkanik, Bogi Shamol, Shaykhs, Tozabog, Shohimardon, Doshoyoq, Qosh, Gadoylar and Gandumiyon (Only Hazorasp and Qosh gates have survived).

The walls and several gates of the fortress were destroyed in 1873 when the Russian troops led by General von Kaufmann captured it. During the former Soviet period, the wall was used as raw material for brick production. Only about 1400–1600 meters of the wall have survived to this day. In 2005, the northern part of the fortress, 80 meters long, was restored to its original state by the UNESCO office in Uzbekistan. In 2008-2009, another 140 meters were repaired by the Ministry of Culture and Sports of Uzbekistan and a 30-meter protection zone was established around the wall of Dishan Kala by the decree of the Cabinet of Ministers of Uzbekistan in 2007.

In the eastern cities, the gates and entrances of public buildings and private houses have always been of great importance: the more impressive they look, the more respect and recognition the city, the buildings and their authors receive. Therefore, the gates have been and remain an important part of the city design. The gates were decorated with beautiful, colorful tiles and verses from the Qur’an. Sometimes the gates had inscriptions praising the khan or excerpts from poems.

== Gates of Dishan Kala ==
The walls of Deshan-Kala had 10 gates

=== Pishkanik Gate ===
Pishkanik gate was located in the east and took their name from a nearby kishlak. They were also called Kumyaska because a mahalla (residential quarter) with the same name was located at the gate.

=== Gandimiyon Gate (1842-1970) ===
It was named after the nearby village where the Gandimyan Treaty was signed in 1873, which annexed the Khanate of Khiva to the Russian Empire. The gate was demolished and a cotton cleaning plant was built in its place. Gandimiyon Gate was fully restored in 1970 with the help of old drawings and photographs.

=== Hazorasp Gate (19th century) ===
Hazorasp gate is located in the north-eastern part of the city. The road to Yangiaryk, Khanka and Hazorasp passes through this gate. It was rebuilt of baked bricks in 1842 by the order of Allahquli Khan during the construction of the walls of Dishan Kala. The gate consists of two large observation towers on the sides of the wide passage along the Yangiaryk road. Above the passage, there is a gallery with arched windows on both sides, and its top is decorated with battlements. This is the only decorative element of the gate, but the structure impresses with its expressive shapes. The gate connects Khiva with Yangiaryk, Bogot, Khanqa and Hazorasp settlements. Dimensions: according to the plan 23.5 x 6.5 meters; height: 12.2 meters.

=== “Qo'sh Darvoza” Gate (1912) ===
The northern gate of Dishan Kala on the way to Urgench was built in the early 20th century. It has three cylindrical towers on the outside, with two passages and a traditional gallery covered with windows between them. Service rooms are located on both sides of the passages. The main facade of the gate is decorated with mosaics on the towers. The small domes of the towers are decorated with turquoise tiles. Dimensions: according to the plan: 25 x 17 meters; height: 9.45 meters.
