= Polvon Gate =

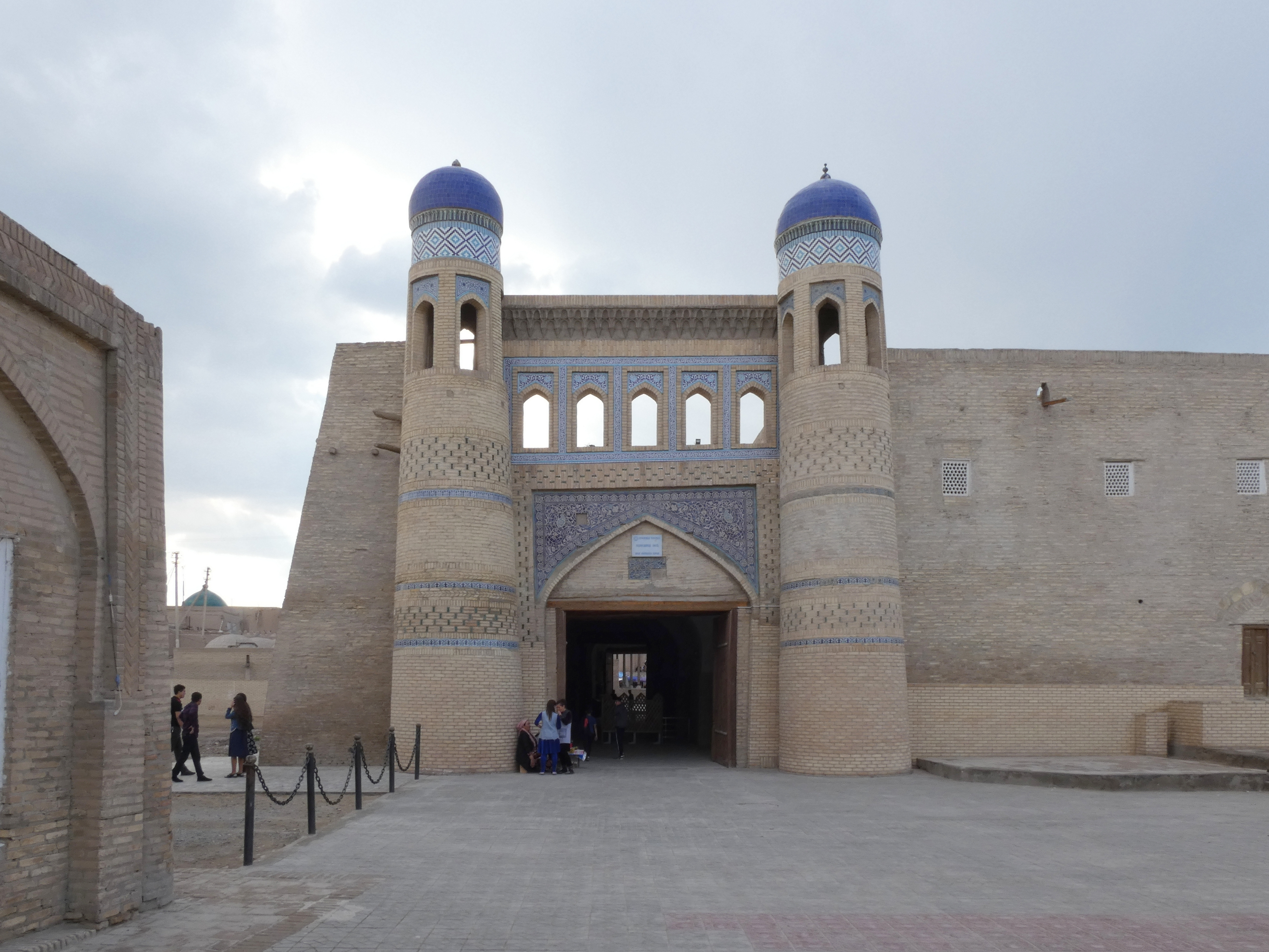
- Interactive map of the Polvon Gate area

General information
- Architectural style: Portal-arched style
- Location: Itchan Kala, Khiva, Uzbekistan
- Coordinates: 41°22′38″N 60°21′44″E
- Year built: 1806
- Renovated: 1835, 1954–55, 1982–84, 1997

Technical details
- Material: Baked bricks, wood, glazed tiles
- Size: 51.76×17.5 m (corridor)

The Polvon Gate is the eastern gate of the Itchan Kala fortress in Khiva (1806). The people also call it Poshshob (Jallod) Gate or Slave Gate. It is the main entrance to Khiva, Uzbekistan.

It was built by seven craftsmen under the supervision of a master builder. A canal that brought water from the Amu Darya river surrounded the fortress wall. The gate had a bridge that could be lifted at night. Polvon Gate's master builder received the same salary as the master builder who worked at the Ark Gate, the gate of the Khiva Khan's palace. The current appearance of Polvon Gate is the result of several renovations. Previously, the gate protruded slightly outward from the fortress wall. It had a watchtower on top that allowed to observe the outside of the city.

The gate was rebuilt in 1806 under Iltazar Khan from baked bricks. In addition, a long corridor – a vault was also built, which served as a place for trade stalls. The towers on the side of the gate were connected to the city wall. After the construction of the caravanserai and the covered bazaar in 1832–1833, the gate lost its role as a market. In 1835, the Olloqulixon Madrasa was built inside the gate, and its western part was rebuilt. A new bathhouse with two domes and a portal was built in front of it. The inner courtyard was enlarged as a result of the construction of the Olloqulixon Madrasa. It was also called the “Flower Gate” because of its beautiful glazed tiles.

The gate was named after the Khiva poet, who lived in the 13th century, the author of more than three hundred quatrains, and the defender of the city, Pahlavon Mahmud (or Polvon Mahmud). Pahlavon Mahmud was buried in a Mausoleum behind the Juma Mosque.

The gate is well preserved. The upper portal arch narrows like an arrow to the top, and a blue and dark blue mosaic picture covers the wall. The sign above the entrance door reminds the guests that the gate is over 400 years old and that this architectural monument is under state protection.

There are two minarets on the exit side, which were once covered with blue domes. The carved wooden doors have preserved the craftsmanship of the craftsmen of that era in the form of patterns on their faces.

== Architecture ==
The gate has a portal-arched style, and the wooden door has two sides with flower-minarets. There are arches on the top of the gate and the flower-heads. The portal and the flower-minarets are decorated with carved bricks in a wavy style, and the blue glazed tiles are preserved. The gatehouse is a long corridor (51.76×17.5 m in plan), covered with six domes. The diameter of the large dome is 5.2 m, and the diameter of the small dome is 4.5 m. There are shops (2.8×4.4 m) on both sides of the corridor (8 on the north side and 11 on the south side). The year of construction of the gate is written. The stone house – Olloqulikhan's residence was located near this gate. The orders to execute the criminals were often announced in front of Polvon Gate. There was a slave market on the right side of the gate when leaving the Itchan Kala until 1873. The slaves who tried to escape waited for the death penalty under the gate. The Olloqulikhan madrasah, the Olloqulikhan caravanserai and the covered bazaar are adjacent to Polvon Gate. It was repaired in 1954–55 and 1982–1984.

In 1911, the southern part of Polvon Gate collapsed completely. The gate photo taken by the photographer Khudaibergen Devanov in the same year is kept in the Itchan Kala museum fund. Polvon Gate was repaired in 1930. The gate was also renovated in 1982 and 1997. Currently, there are shops with trade stalls inside the gate.

== History ==
The gates themselves are only part of the ensemble. Many buildings were built here in different periods. Many rulers considered it necessary to leave their mark in the history of the complex. Olloqulikhan built a madrasah and a caravanserai here in the 1830s.

At the same time, the Tosh Hovli stone palace appeared here. In the beginning of the 19th century, the Kutlugmurad Inak madrasah was erected. After the construction of the gate, almost immediately the Anushxon bathhouses were built here, and then the Hojiberdiboy madrasah. With each new building, there was less and less space. Thus, some buildings intersected, and some went beyond the Ichan Kala wall.

Each of the buildings is unique in its design, each has a history. Some stand out for their aesthetic shapes, others for their rich decorations and bright ornaments. Each of them performed an important function for the city life.

In the caravanserai – a special guesthouse for caravan drivers – merchants found a place to stay, travelers rested, and young people studied at the madrasah. Trade took place in the square. For this purpose, a whole gallery was allocated – there were many shops with different goods on both sides. Almost nothing has changed today. You can still find many merchants here.

== Gallery ==
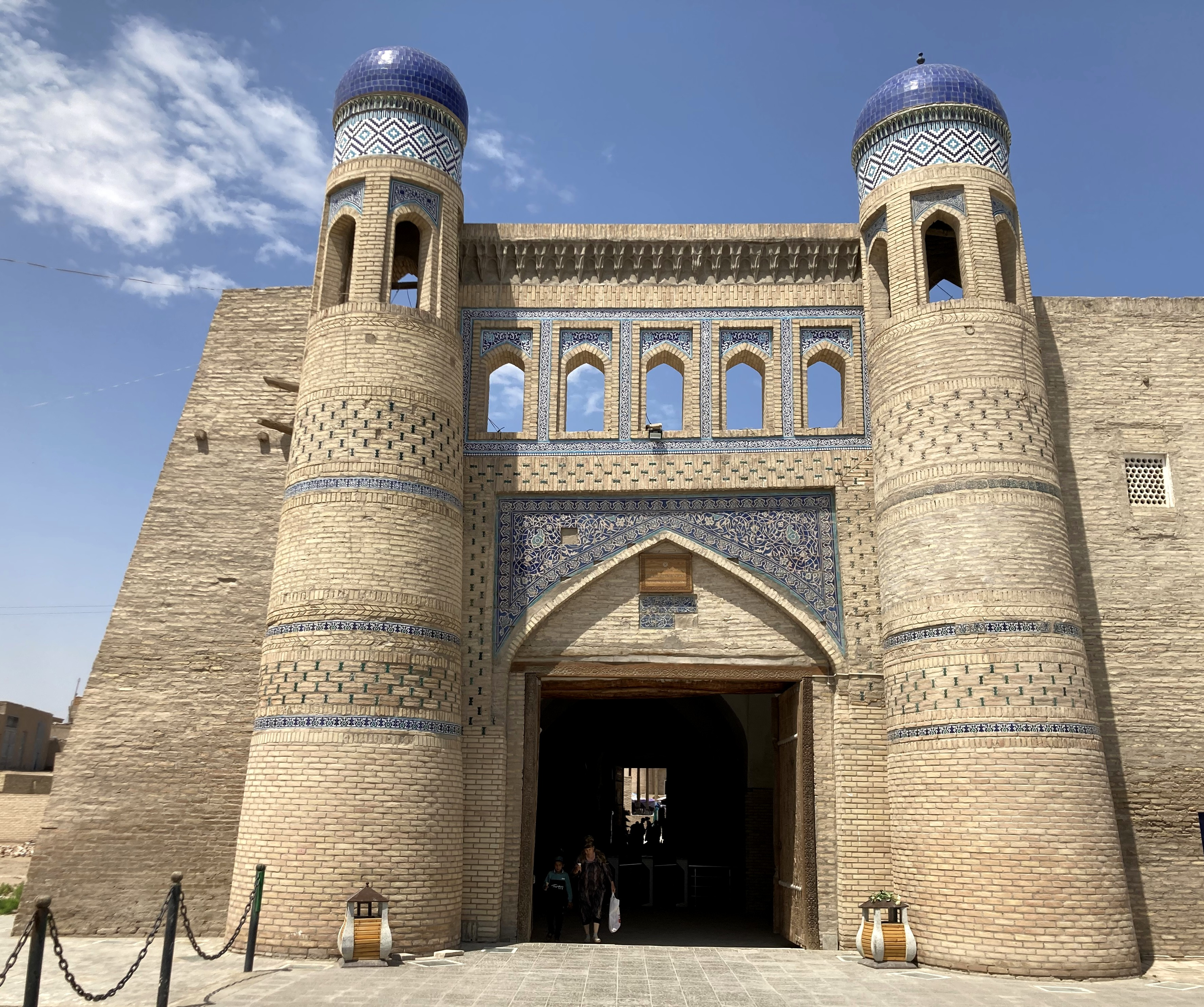
Front view of the Polvon Gate

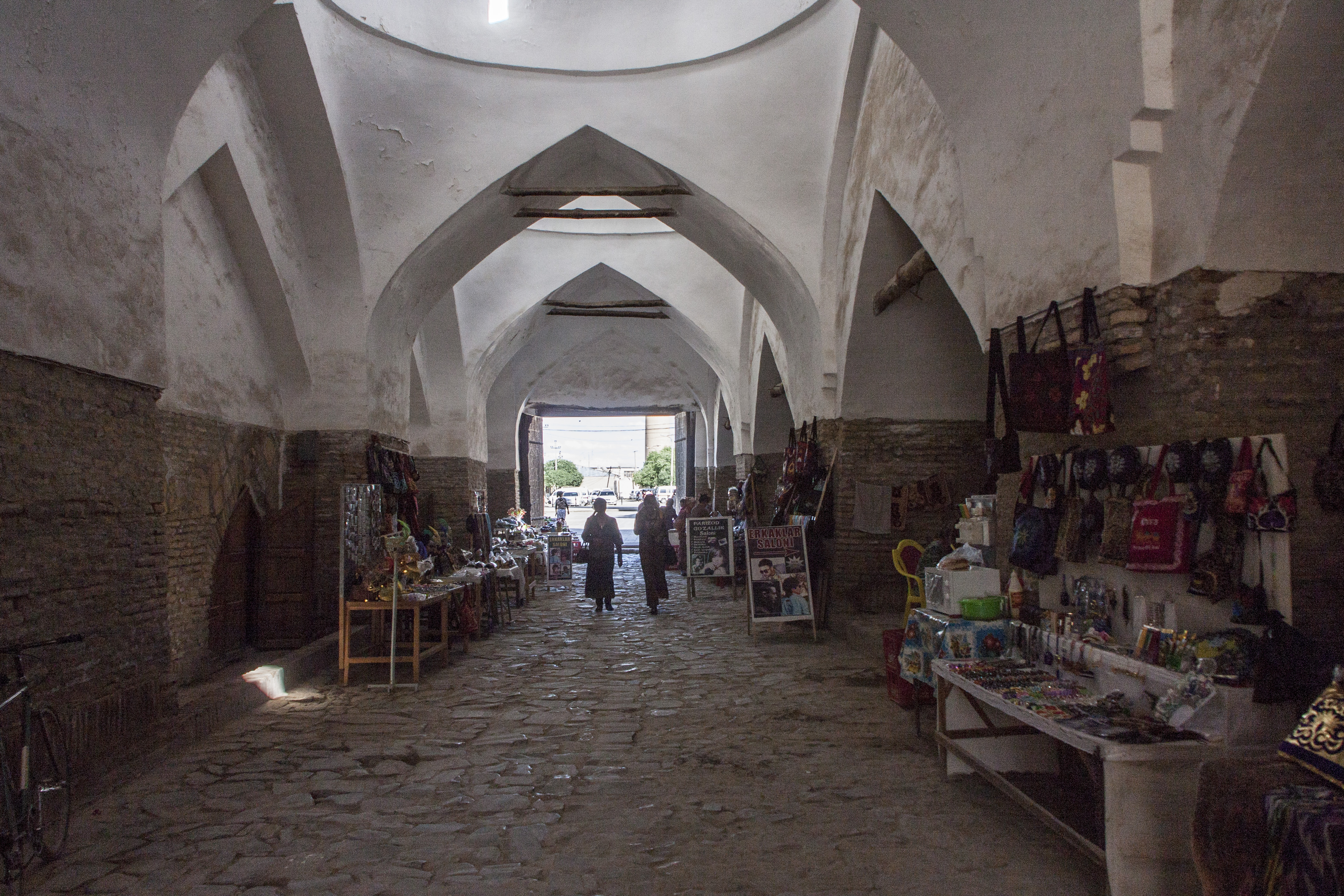
Shops inside the Polvon Gate

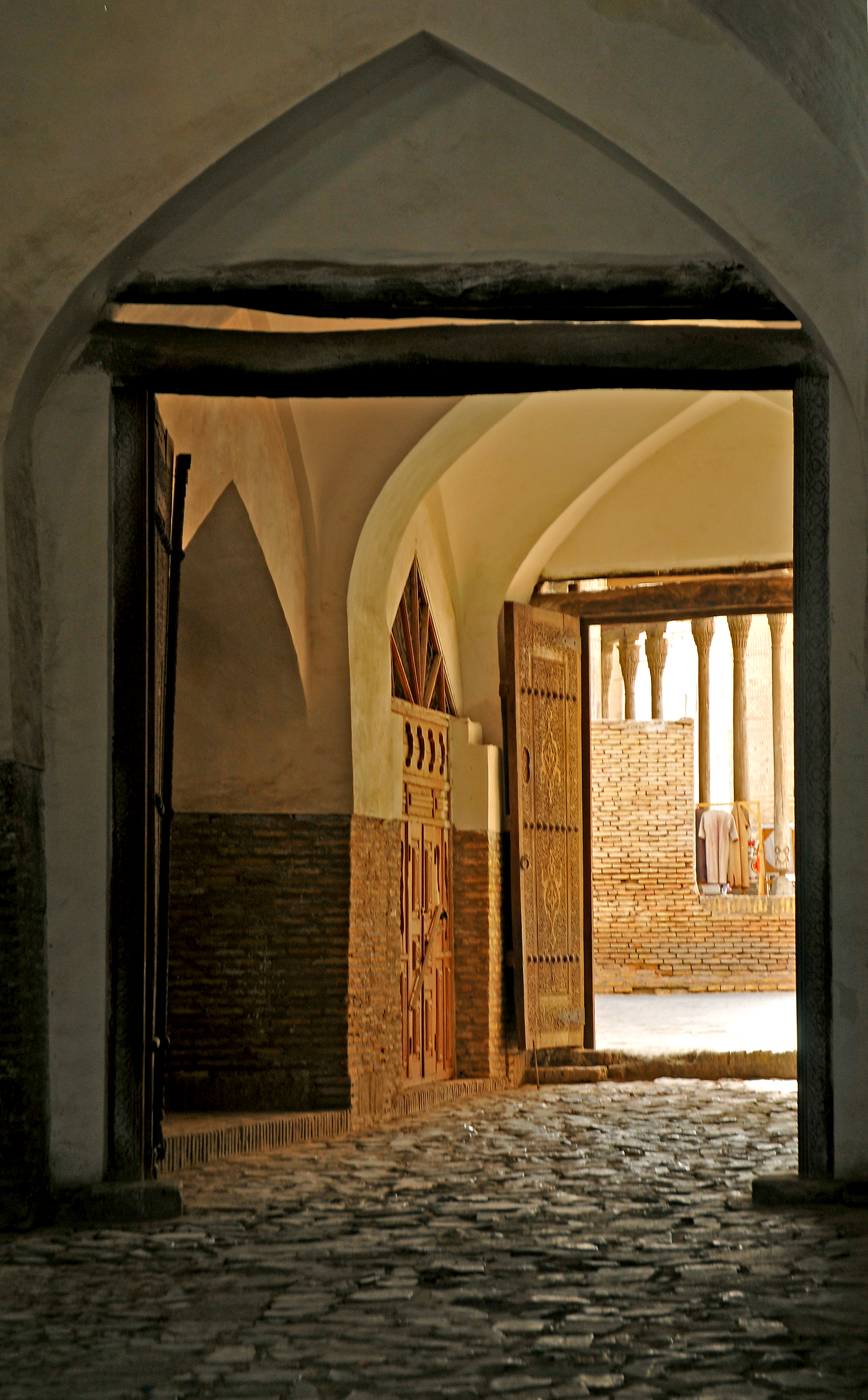
Inside view of the Polvon Gate
