= Yusuf Yasovulboshi Madrasah =

Madrasa in Khiva, Khorazm, Uzbekistan

- Muhammad Yusuf Yasovulboshi Madrasah
- Interactive map of the Yusuf Yasovulboshi Madrasah area

General information
- Location: 30 Zargarlar Street, Itchan Kala, Khiva, Khorazm Region, Uzbekistan
- Coordinates: 41.378957145817715°N 60.360406011324876°E
- Year built: 1906
- Owner: State Property

Height
- Height: 36,45 m

Technical details
- Material: brick
- Floor area: 21X11,2 m

Design and construction
- Architect: Qalandar Kochum

References
- Yusuf Yasovulboshi Madrasah in map

Yusuf Yasovulboshi Madrasah (or Muhammad Yusuf Yasovulboshi Madrasa) is an architectural monument in Khiva, Khorezm region. The madrasa was built in 1906, and today it is located at 30, Zargarlar Street, Itchan Kala neighborhood.

The historical object "Itchan Kala" state museum-reserve belongs to the state property based on the right of operational management. It is included in the list of protected objects according to the decision of the Cabinet of Ministers of the Republic of Uzbekistan "On approval of the national list of real estate objects of tangible cultural heritage".

== History ==
The Yusuf Yasovulbashi madrasah was built in 1906 in the territory of the Itchan Kala museum-reserve in the city of Khiva, opposite the Musa Tora madrasa and west of the Pahlavon Mahmud archaeological monument. The construction was supervised by master Qalandar Kochum. The madrasa was named after Yusuf Yasovulbashi, the commander of Khan's army, and his funds were spent on its construction. During the conquest of the Khiva Khanate by the Russian Empire at the beginning of the 20th century, Yusuf Yasulbashi was responsible for controlling the prisons and maintaining the security of the Khiva Khanate. He was tasked with tracking secret documents and leading a military unit composed of soldiers recruited from nomadic tribes.

Currently, the neighborhood committee is located in the building.

Yusuf Yasovulbashi madrasa also had a schoolhouse, which was mentioned in the foundation certificate, and this made it different from other madrasas. The endowment land was allotted to the madrasa four years before its construction. In the condition of the foundation, it is mentioned that the managers should follow the Quran and Sharia rules. At the same time, they had to teach Muslim children to read the Quran. It was necessary for teachers to teach children strictly following the teaching procedure, except for holidays and weekends.

The history of its construction was written on the marble stone above the entrance of the madrasa.

Today, its kitchen operates as a restaurant "Yasovulboshi".

== Structure ==
Madrasah was built in the center of the Itchan Kala. It also includes the mausoleum of Usta Yusuf Khos Hajib (XI century, Kashkar). The walls were made of bricks. The madrasah is rectangular in shape (35x25 m), has flower patterns protruding from the corners, has a gabled dome (gable height is 8 m), a courtyard (21x11.2 m) surrounded by arched rooms, and a mosque (5x5 m). 2 flat bows were made on the arch; There is a 3-domed miyansarai (antechamber) with a row of arches on 2 sides of the facade, 2 rooms not connected to it (the entrance door is from the outside) on the south side of the miyansarai, and a mosque with a circular dome on the north side. The front of the mosque is surrounded by auxiliary farm rooms, forming a small square (9x14 m).

== See also ==
- Poyanda mausoleum
- Matrasulboy Mirzaboshi Madrasah
- Sheikh Mavlon Complex
- Matniyoz Devonbegi Madrasah
