= Sheikh Kalandar Bobo Complex =

- Sho Kalandar Bobo Complex
- Interactive map of the Sheikh Kalandar Bobo Complex area

General information
- Architectural style: Central Asian Architecture
- Location: 36, Ismailov Street, Itchan Kala, Khiva, Khorazm Region, Uzbekistan
- Coordinates: 41.40778433888343°N 60.43778063767224°E
- Construction started: 16th century
- Construction stopped: 1894
- Owner: State Property

Technical details
- Material: baked brick
- Floor count: 1

References
- Avesto meʼmoriy majmuasi xaritada

Sheikh Kalandar Bobo Complex (or Sho Kalandar Bobo Complex, Shokalandar Bobo Complex) is an architectural monument in Khiva, Khorazm Region, Republic of Uzbekistan. The construction of the complex began in the 16th century and was completed in 1894. Today the complex is located at 36, Ismailov Street, "New Life" neighborhood.

By the decision of the Cabinet of Ministers of the Republic of Uzbekistan on 4 October 2019, the Sheikh Kalandar Bobo Complex was included in the national list of real estate objects of tangible cultural heritage and received state protection. Currently, the Itchan Kala state museum-reserve is state property based on the right of operational management.

== History and architecture ==
The complex of Sheikh Kalandar Bobo was built in the 16th century by Rahmatulla Yasovulbashi, one of the khan's officials, and was completed in 1894 by Bikajon Bika, the sister of Muhammad Rahim Khan II.

Around the mausoleum of Sheikh Kalandar Bobo, who lived in the 16th century, a complex consisting of a madrasah, a mosque, and a minaret was built. The madrasa is entered through a 3-domed mionsarai (corridor). 3 rooms of mionsarai are interconnected with a classroom and a mosque. The pediment faces the north, and flower-like patterns are raised in its 2 corners. The minaret (height 18 m, base diameter 6 m) is located 4 m away from the pediment, in the center of the head-style madrasa. Bricks are drawn in a wavy pattern on his "belt". Only the shrine has been preserved of the 3 rooms of mausoleum.

According to another source, the complex of Sheikh Kalandar Bobo consists of a one-story madrasah and minaret, which was built at the end of the 19th century at the place where Sheikh Kalandar Bobo was buried. It is said that Sheikh Kalandar Bobo or Sho Kalandar Bobo was a sheikh of Sufis and came to Khiva with two dervish brothers to seek faith. The brothers like this city and they stay in Khiva. The residents of the city where Sheikh Kalandar Bobo taught Sufism built this complex as a way of respecting him. The mausoleum of Sheikh Kalandar Bobo in the complex is located on the southwest side of Sheikh Kalandar Bobo Madrasah and Bikajon Bika Madrasah. In 1997, the one-domed portal and the tomb were renovated in the complex.

== See also ==
- Pahlavon Mahmud complex
- Sheikh Mavlon Complex
- Avesto Architectural Complex
- Dashkin Bobo Complex
- Al-Beruni Architectural Complex
