= Al-Khwarizmi Complex =

- "Khwarizmi Complex"

General information
- Architectural style: Central Asian Architecture
- Location: Al-Khwarizmi street, Urganch, Khorazm Region, Uzbekistan
- Coordinates: 41.5817°N 60.6319°E
- Construction started: 2000
- Owner: State Property

Al-Khwarizmi Complex is a complex consisting of a garden and a symbolic mausoleum located on Al-Khwarizmi street, Urganch, Khorazm Region, Uzbekistan. By the decision of the Cabinet of Ministers of the Republic of Uzbekistan on October 4, 2019, the complex was included in the national list of real estate objects of tangible cultural heritage and received state protection. Currently, it is state property based on the right of operational management of the Department of Culture of Khorazm Region.

== History ==
The complex mainly consists of a symbolic mausoleum and a park. The Al-Khwarizmi complex was completed in 2000 on the initiative of the former president of the Republic of Uzbekistan, Islam Karimov, on Al-Khwarizmi street in the city of Urganch. Urganch International Airport is very close to Al-Khwarizmi and Al-Beruni architectural complexes located on both sides of Al-Khwarizmi street.

The Al-Khwarizmi complex was built according to the style typical of medieval building traditions. The complex consists mainly of two architectural parts. The first part is the entrance, where there is a unique gate and a symbolic mausoleum. The entrance also has a porch that runs along either side of the corridor and two rooms. The symbolic mausoleum has a typical dome and is decorated with blue tiles. Also, the facade is decorated with inscriptions and patterns, and a carved door is installed on it. Al-Khwarizmi architectural complex has a garden planted with fruit trees. At the same time, Al-Khwarizmi museum exposition was organized in the complex. The complex was reconstructed in March and April 2018.

== Renovation ==
In 2022, at the initiative of the President of the Republic of Uzbekistan, Shavkat Mirziyoyev, a project for the construction of the Al-Khwarizmi complex with a total area of 140 hectares was developed. According to the project, Al-Khwarizmi university and student dormitory, 3000-bed school and 1500-bed pre-school educational institution, IT park, innovation center, sports complex, research center, apartment buildings and parking lots, central alley - "New Uzbekistan" park will be built.

== See also ==
- Pahlavon Mahmud complex
- Sheikh Mavlon Complex
- Avesto Architectural Complex
- Dashkin Bobo Complex
- Al-Beruni Architectural Complex
