= Dashkin Bobo Complex =

- Dashkinjan Bobo Complex
- Interactive map of the Dashkin Bobo Complex area

General information
- Location: Al-Khorazmi Street, Urganch, Khorazm Region, Uzbekistan
- Coordinates: 41.55883227758731°N 60.623198999983885°E
- Year built: 2000
- Construction started: VII asr
- Completed: 1915
- Owner: State Property

Dashkin Bobo Complex (or Dashkinjan Bobo Complex) is an architectural monument in Urganch, Khorazm Region. The complex was built in 1915, and today it is located at 43a, Yuldosh Bobojanov Street, Urganch. By the decision of the Cabinet of Ministers of the Republic of Uzbekistan on 4 October 2019, the complex was included in the national list of real estate objects of tangible cultural heritage and received state protection.

== History ==
Initially, there was a historical cemetery on the site of the complex. It is said that the mausoleum was named after the Arab commander Sayyid ibn Abu Waqqas, who came to Khorezm in the 7th-8th centuries to spread Islam. There are also cemeteries with this name in Hazorasp district of Khorezm region and Xojeli district of Karakalpakstan.

The commander of the army, Sa'd ibn Abu Waqqas, propagated the religion of Islam and fought for it in the oasis. In one of these battles, along with other fighters, the commander himself died and was buried in this cemetery.

Local residents called this cemetery as Dashkin bobo which means "A flood-repelling saint". Because, twice a year, the Amudarya flowed out of its bed and overflowed and the water level dropped when it reached the cemetery.

In 1646–1648, Abu al-Ghazi Bahadur surrounded the cemetery with a straw wall and built a mausoleum.

Another Khan of Khiva, Ollokuli Khan, after his unsuccessful military campaigns in Khorasan and South Turkmenistan, improved the surroundings of the cemetery and built the mausoleum that has survived to this day.

Before the revolution, a madrasah functioned here. In 1927, the mausoleum was closed by the Soviets. Until 1939, the mausoleum served as a prison. It was reopened in 1941–1947. It was registered with the state in 1948 and the monument was given to the "Golden Heritage" society. On 21 December 1973, the monument was taken under state protection. In the 1980s, it was partially renovated and turned into an archive. In 1991, it was given to the religious office of Muslims of Uzbekistan. It was renovated in 2005 on the occasion of the 1000th anniversary of the Mamun Academy. Currently, the complex is used as a representative office of Khorezm region of the Muslims of Uzbekistan and a place of pilgrimage.

== See also ==
- Pahlavon Mahmud complex
- Sheikh Mavlon Complex
- Avesto Architectural Complex
- Al-Beruni Architectural Complex
- Al-Khwarizmi Complex
