= Al-Beruni Architectural Complex =

- Beruni Complex

General information
- Location: Al-Khorazmi Street, Urganch, Khorazm Region, Uzbekistan
- Year built: 2000
- Owner: State Property

Technical details
- Material: baked brick
- Floor area: 20 hectares

Al-Beruni Architectural Complex (or Al-Beruni Complex, Beruni Complex) is a complex located on Al-Khorazmi street, Urganch city, Khorazm Region. The complex was completed in 2000 at the initiative of former President of Uzbekistan Islam Karimov. The museum complex consists of a park with an area of 20 hectares.

By the decision of the Cabinet of Ministers of the Republic of Uzbekistan on October 4, 2019, the complex was included in the national list of real estate objects of tangible cultural heritage and received state protection. Currently, the Itchan Kala state museum-reserve is state property based on the right of operational management.

== History ==
The Beruni Architectural Complex was built opposite the Al-Khwarizmi Complex near the International Airport located in Urganch. In the construction of the mausoleum, it was built in the architectural style typical for Khorezmshahs – with a dome. Dome and facade are decorated with tiles. The mausoleum is entered through a carved door located under the pediment.

== Location and Structure ==
Al-Beruni Architectural Complex is one of two complexes within walking distance of Urganch Airport. The complex is on the right side of the road as you drive south from the airport.

As you walk towards the building through the western part of the complex, you can see decorated structures on both sides of the corridor. The courtyard of the complex, meanwhile, has a wall with three windows, and the wall is mostly decorated with blue tiles. The pediment of the complex is supported by four wooden columns. Flowers that match the colors of the tiles are usually planted in this area.

The main attraction of the complex is the building at the end. It has a high terrace decorated with tiles, as well as a permanently locked door in the inner arched area.

== See also ==
- Pahlavon Mahmud complex
- Sheikh Mavlon Complex
- Avesto Architectural Complex
- Dashkin Bobo Complex
- Al-Khwarizmi Complex
