= Pourya-ye Vali =

Iranian sport wrestler

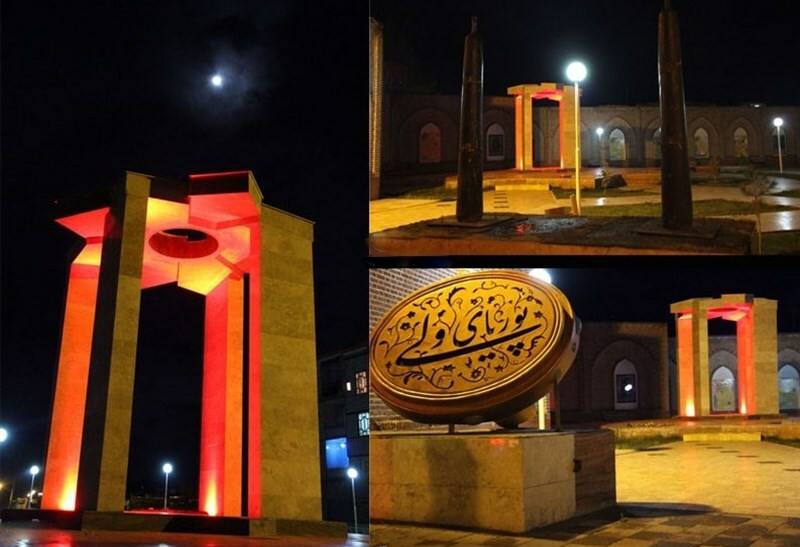
- Pourya Vali’s Tomb in Khoy, Iran
- Born: Urgench, Khwarazm, Uzbekistan
- Died: Khoy, Iran

Pahlavān Mahmoud, known in Iran as Pouryā-ye Vali (died 1322 CE), was a pahlevani wrestling champion, Sufi teacher and poet from the 14th century Iran, famous for his exceptional strength. He became the patron saint of the city of Khiva, in Uzbekistan.

== Biography ==
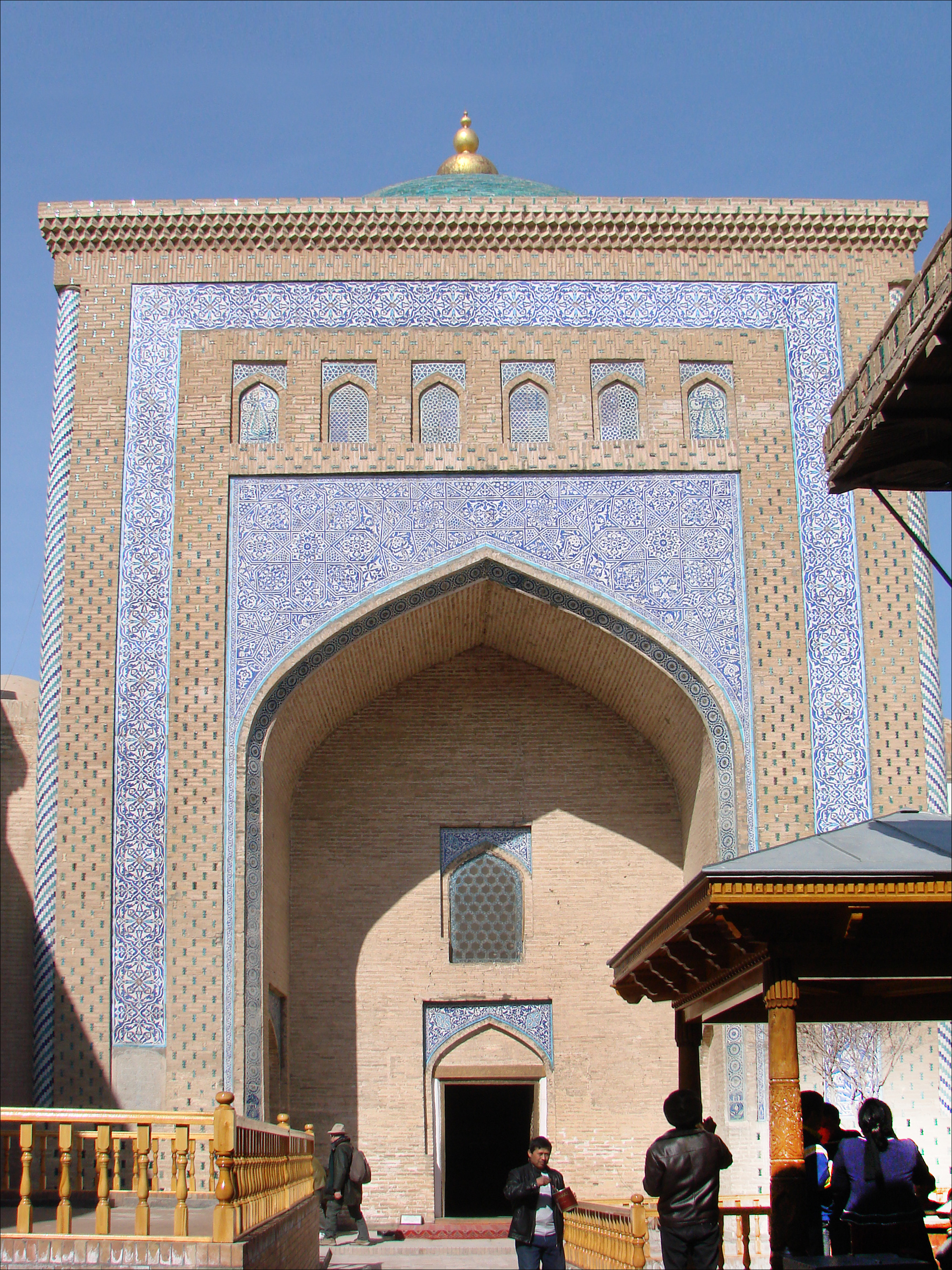
Pahlavon Mahmud Mausoleum in Khiva, Uzbekistan.

Pahlawan Mahmud lived during the years of Mongol rule over Central Asia. He achieved great fame at the time both as a professional wrestler and as a poet-philosopher. Above all, he is said to have been a high-ranking Sufi teacher.

A special feature of Pahlavan Mahmoud's school (Zurkhaneh) was the education of the students' minds through the martial art of wrestling, a discipline with which he made a name for himself as far away as Central Asia and India. In Persian as well as in Old Uzbek (Chagatay) and Hindi, the word Pahlavan /پهلوان (other spelling Palvan/پلوان) became a synonym for a wrestler, hero, or champion. After his death he was venerated as a saint in Persia and Central Asia. In Iran, the nickname Pouryā-ye Vali has been attributed to Pahlavān Mahmoud.

One legend says that the location of his tomb is in Khoy of Iran, but another legends says that Pahlavān Mahmoud was buried in his own workshop in Khiva, Uzbekistan, which was transformed into the Pahlavon Mahmud Mausoleum.

=== Literature ===
Among his works was a book titled Kanz ol-Haghayegh (literally The Treasure of Truths) in Persian. A couplet from him which is sung in Zourkhaneh, is:

افتادگی آموز اگر طالب فیضی
هرگز نخورد آب زمینی که بلند است

Pronunciation:

oftādegi āmooz agar tālebe feyzi, 
hargez nakhorad āb zamini ke boland ast

Literal translation:

Learn modesty if you desire knowledge, 
A high land would never be irrigated

== See also ==
- Pahlevanan
- Pahlevani and zoorkhaneh rituals
