= Kaltaminor =

Kalta Minor
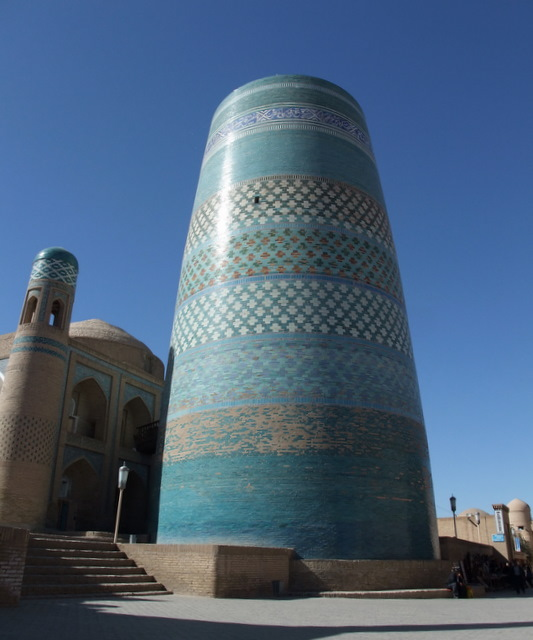
- Interactive map of the Kalta Minor area

General information
- Architectural style: Islamic
- Location: Khiva, Uzbekistan
- Coordinates: 41°22′42″N 60°21′29″E
- Year built: 1852-1855
- Construction started: 1852
- Construction stopped: 1855
- Renovated: 1996-97

Height
- Height: 29 m (unfinished)

Technical details
- Material: Brick, glazed tiles

Design and construction
- Architect: Muhammad Amin Khan

Kaltaminor is a memorial minaret in Khiva. It is located on the front side of the Muhammad Amin Khan madrasa and sometimes considered as part of it.

== History ==
Kaltaminor was created by Muhammad Amin Bahadur Khan, the khan of the Khiva Khanate, as the largest and tallest minaret in the Muslim world.

According to its plan, the height of the minaret was to be 70–80 meters, and its diameter was to decrease sharply as the height increased, which was supposed to increase the stability of the minaret. Muhammad Amin Khan even decided to build the tallest minaret in the world, surpassing the 73-meter Qutb Minar in India. The diameter of its base is 14.2 meters. Some sources mention that it was intended to reach 110 meters.

Construction began in 1852 and stopped abruptly in 1855, when the height of the minaret reached 29 meters. According to the Khiva historian and writer, the construction was not completed because Muhammad Amin Khan died in a battle near Sarakhs in 1855.

The historian Mulla Olim Maxdum Hoji wrote about the construction of the minaret in his work “History of Turkestan”:

After the madrasa was completed, Muhammad Amin Khan ordered to build the tallest minaret next to the madrasa. The construction of the minaret was in progress (1855), when Muhammad Amin Khan sent an army to Iran and was martyred in the battle, as a result the minaret started by the khan remained unfinished.

The minaret was built in front of the eyes of the Khiva poet, historian and statesman Muhammad Riza Ogahi. On the Muhammad Amin Khan minaret, you can see 12 of the 16 historical verses of Ogahiy’s poetry. The wooden staircase inside has been repaired frequently. The inscription, which was restored in its original form during the restoration, compares the minaret to the Tubo tree that grows in paradise, and calls it a pillar that holds the vault of the sky, that is, the dome of heaven. Ogahiy wrote several poetic dates for the completion of the minaret. One of them is written on beautiful glazed tiles above the minaret. The writings were broken and torn off during the Soviet rule. After Uzbekistan gained independence, these writings were found through Ogahiy’s manuscript and restored. The letters were restored by the master Rustam Tohirov. Kalta Minor is famous for its incompleteness, as well as its unique decorations. It is the only minaret covered entirely with glazed tiles.

== Architecture ==
Geometric patterns are widely used in decorating the minaret. From the second floor, you can climb to the top of the minaret. There is a wooden staircase inside that leads up. The staircase has been repaired frequently. White, green, turquoise tiles are used in the decoration (it is also called the blue minaret because of the frequent use of turquoise tiles). On the occasion of the 2500th anniversary of Khiva (1996–97), the glazed tile inscriptions that fell from the upper part of Kalta Minor were completely restored by the founders of the “Hayot” joint-stock company and the “nasta’liq” writings in Persian by Ogahiy were restored. The letters were restored by the master Rustam Tohirov. Kalta Minor is famous for its incompleteness, as well as its unique decorations. It is the only minaret covered entirely with glazed tiles.

== Gallery ==
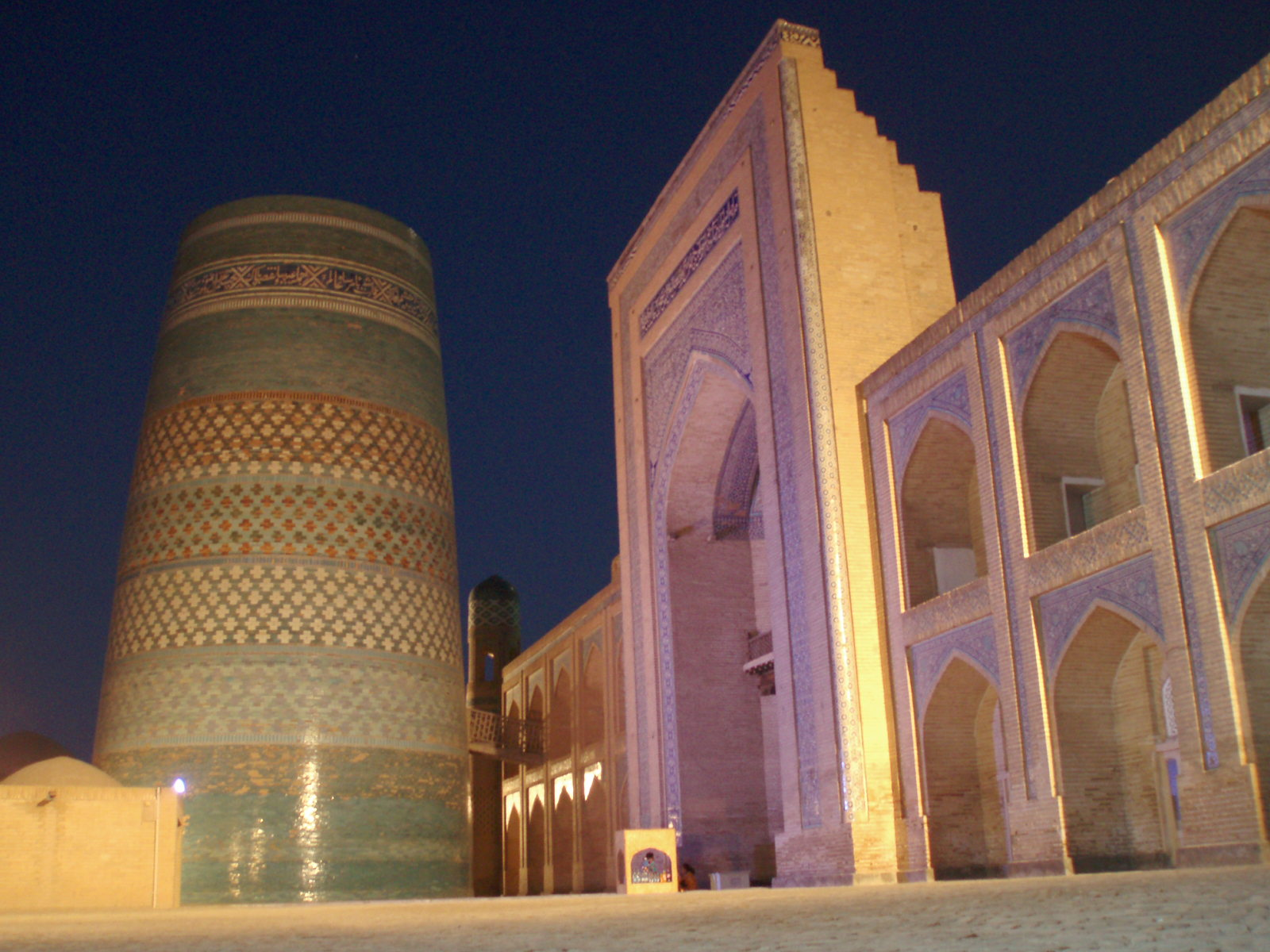
Kalta Minor Minaret and Mukhammad Aminkhan madrasah

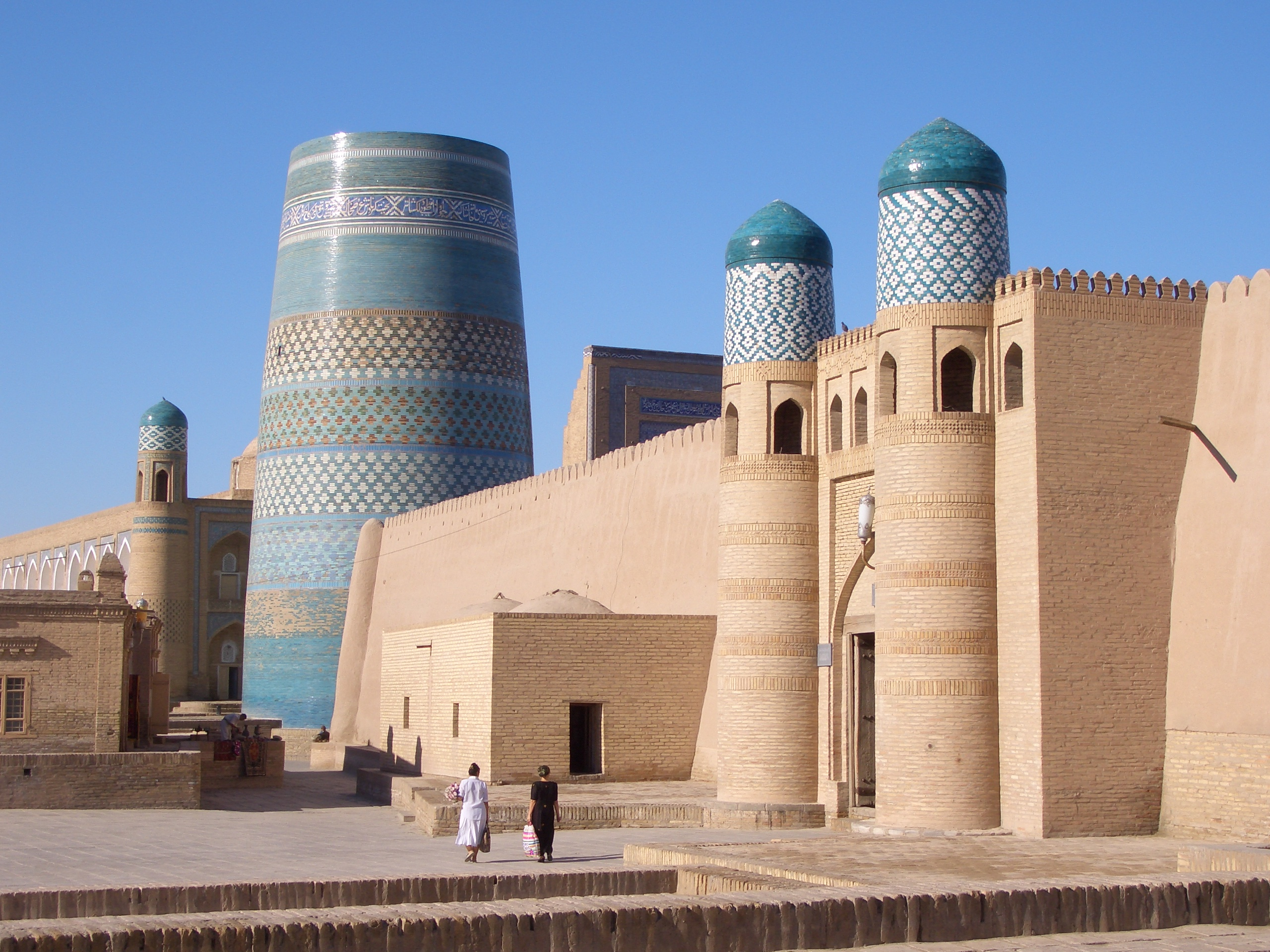
View of Kalta Minor Minaret

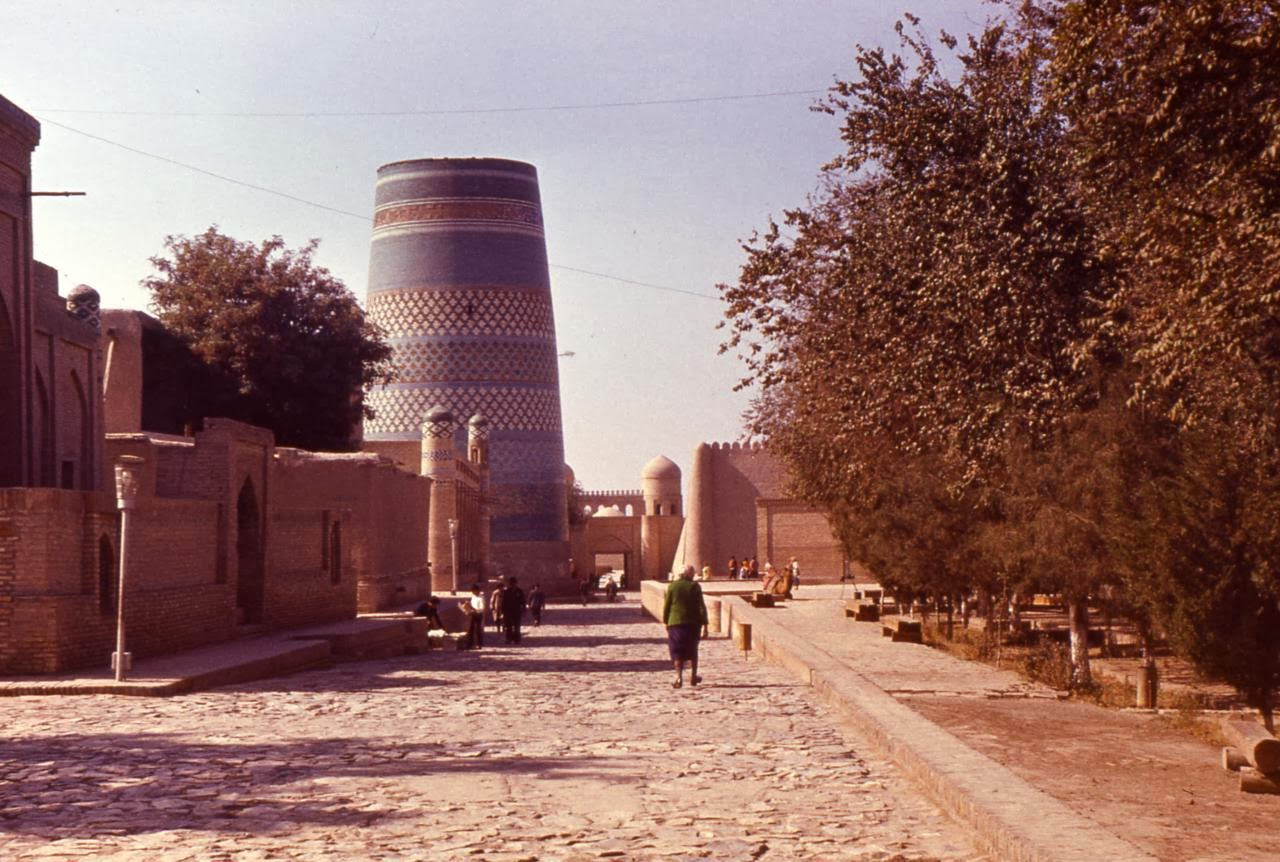
Kalta Minor in 1984

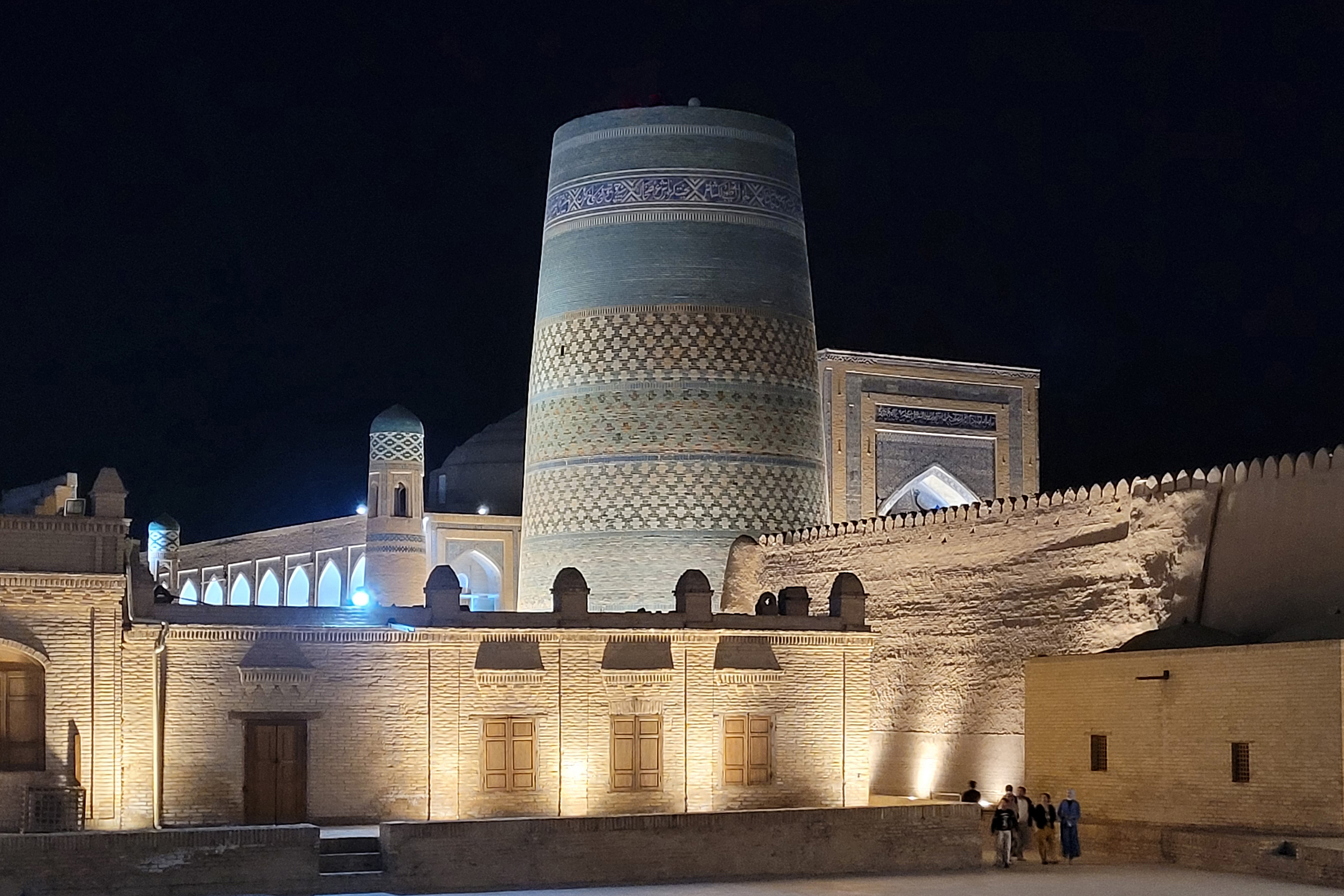
Kalta Minor at night
