= Muhammad Amin Bahadur Khan =

Khan of Khiva from 1845 to 1855

Muhammad Amin Bahadur Khan (Turki and Persian: محمد امین بهادر خان; Khiva, 1817 - Sarahs, 1855), was the 7th Khan of the Uzbek Kungrat dynasty in the Khanate of Khiva. He reigned between 1845 and 1855, when he was killed in battle.

== Biography ==
Muhammad Amin was the son of Allah Kuli Bahadur Khan and ascended to the throne in 1845, after the death of his brother Muhammad Rahim Quli Khan (1842–1845). As Khan, he attempted to strengthen the central power and subdue the constant rebellion of the Turkmen tribes, but without much success. He also led a dozen raids against Merv and Khorasan. After six campaigns he conquered the citadel of Merv and the fortress of Ýolöten.

During the reign of Muhammad Amin Khan, diplomatic relations were maintained with the Russian Empire, the Ottoman Empire, Iran and Afghanistan.

The Khivans had dominated the Kazakhs in recent years, but control over the lower Syr Darya was disputed by the Khanate of Kokand, while the Russian Empire also claimed sovereignty over the Kazakhs. In December 1846, emissaries of the Khan headed to Orenburg, a Russian border city, and from there to the capital Saint Petersburg, where they arrived on 19 March 1847.
The two envoys of the Khan demanded the demolition of the Raim fort (ru) built by the Russians near the mouth of the Syr-Darya River into the Aral Sea. Tsar Nicholas I was categorically opposed and small skirmishes followed in 1847-1848 between Russian soldiers and the Khan's warriors. Having suffered setbacks and with his army exhausted, Muhammad Amin Khan decided to send a new emissary to St. Petersburg in 1850, but the talks came to nothing.

=== Death ===
In 1855, Muhammad Amin led an expedition to the Sarahs oasis against the Turkmen Teke tribe to conquer present-day southern Turkmenistan. The Teke asked support from the Persian governor of Mashhad, Feridun Mirza, who sent 7,000 men from the citadel of Derbent and another 3,000 from Khorasan with 10 cannons.

The following battle turned into a defeat for the Khiva Khan, in which his 6 cannons were taken by the Persians and his troops dispersed. Muhammad Amin was surprised in his camp by a division from Merv commanded by Muhammad Hussein, taken prisoner and then beheaded. His head is said to have been sent to the Naser al-Din Shah Qajar the Shah of Iran, Shah ordered an honorable burial.

His son Abdullah succeeded him, but he too died six months later in a battle with rebellious tribes. His second son Kutlug Murad was next to ascend the throne, but experienced the same fate. Finally his uncle Sayyid Muhammad Khan (1856–1864) ascended to the throne and was able to restore some order.

== Cultural influence ==
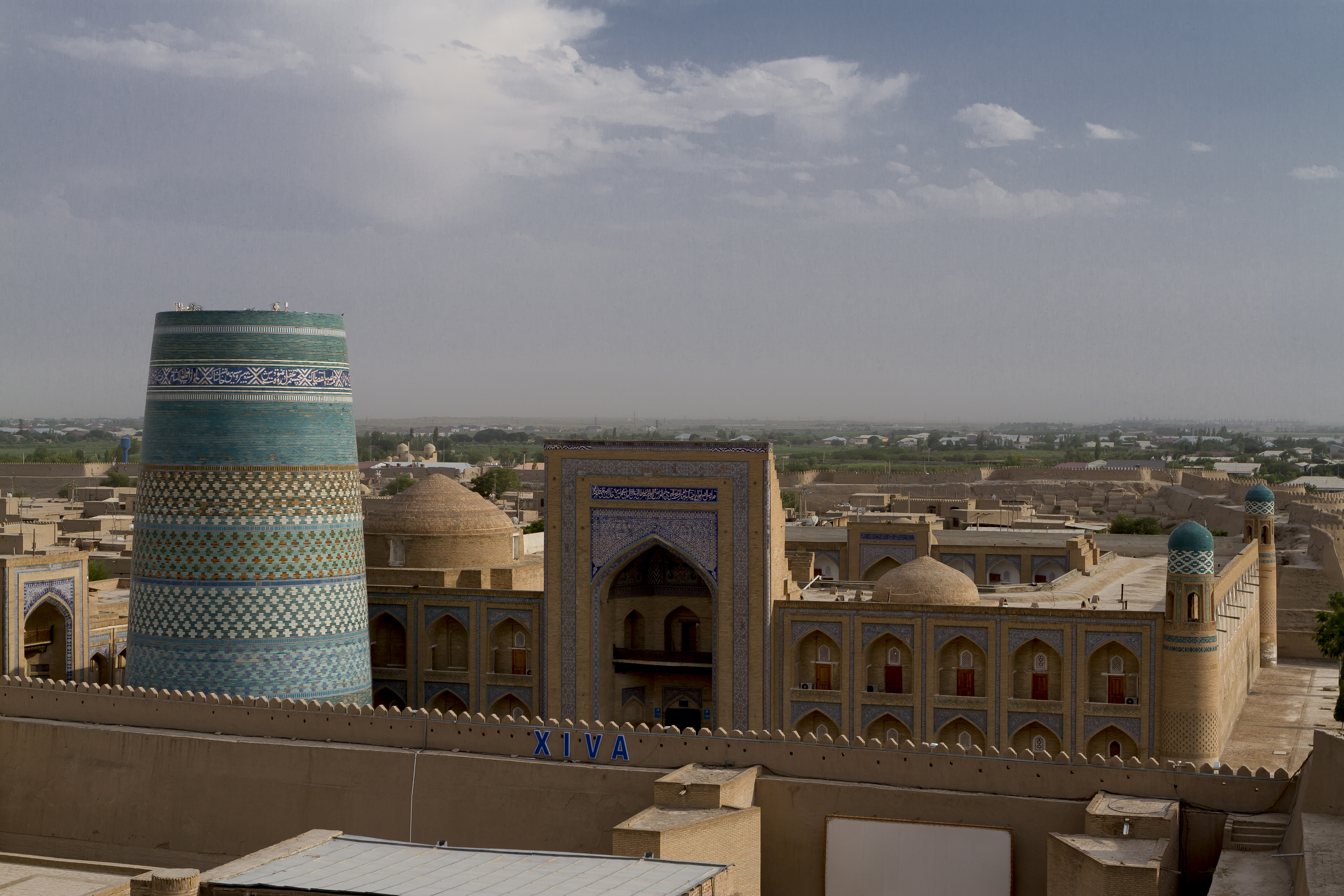
Muhammad Amin Khan Madrasah in Khiva.

It was under the reign of Muhammad Amin that one of the largest and most richly decorated madrasas in the city was built in Khiva, the Muhammad Amin Khan Madrasah which could accommodate up to 260 students. A large amount of land was allocated in different parts of the Khanate, to cover the costs of maintaining the madrasah, students and teachers.

The sovereign also built the Kalta Minor minaret, one of the symbols of the city. Kalta Minor was originally intended to be the tallest minaret in the world, but with the death of Mohammad Amin Khan, the unfinished construction was stopped. Today, both monuments belong to the walled city of Itchan Kala, a UNESCO World Heritage Site.

== Sources ==
- Gulomov Kh. G., Diplomatic relations of the states of Central Asia with Russia in the 18th - first half of the 19th century. Tashkent, 2005
- Gulyamov Ya. G., History of irrigation of Khorezm from ancient times to the present day. Tashkent. 1957
- History of Uzbekistan. T.3. T., 1993.
- History of Uzbekistan in sources. Compiled by B.V. Lunin. Tashkent, 1990
- History of Khorezm. Edited by I. M. Muminov. Tashkent, 1976

Preceded by Muhammad Rahim Quli Khan	Khan of Khiva; 1845–1855	Succeeded by Abdullah Khan
