= The Heroes (2008 TV series) =

Iranian animated series

- پهلوانان
- Genre: Historical / Animation
- Created by: Siavash Zarrinabadi & Mehrdad Sheikhan
- Written by: Siavash Zarrinabadi
- Directed by: Siavash Zarrinabadi & Mehrdad Sheikhan
- Voices of: Ali Hemat Momivand; Bijan Ali Mohammadi; Amir Mohammad Samsami; Zafar Geraei; Hamidreza Ashtianipour; Shahrouz Malekarayi
- Theme music composer: Saeed Ansari
- Composer: Saeed Ansari
- Country of origin: Iran
- Original language: Persian
- No. of seasons: 5
- No. of episodes: 63 (list of episodes)

Production
- Executive producer: Harekat-e Kelidi Company
- Producer: Alireza Golpayegani
- Editor: Siavash Zarrinabadi
- Running time: 30 minutes
- Production company: Saba Animation Center

Original release
- Network: IRIB TV2; IRIB Pooya & Nahal; IRIB TV1
- Release: 2008 – present

The Heroes (Persian: پهلوانان, romanized: Pahlevānān, meaning The Champions) (Note: Persian word Pahlevan (Persian: پهلوان) is a title give to a moral hero that is also an athlete. A good supporter for weak and poor people against cruel people. Pahlevanan is plural of Pahlevan.) is an Iranian animated television series written and directed by Siavash Zarrinabadi and produced by Alireza Golpayegani from Harekat-e Kelidi Company and Saba Animation Center. The first season aired in March 2008 on IRIB TV2 and the last season aired in April 2022 on IRIB TV1. This series was rebroadcast many times by IRIB Pooya & Nahal. The series focuses on fight of Pourya-ye Vali's students against Eskandar Khan and admonishes of Pourya-ye Vali in 13th century.

== Plot ==
Pahlavan Pourya-ye Vali, a blacksmith and master of Pahlevan Haydar Khorasani's Zoorkhaneh, (Note: Pahlevan Haydar Khorasani was grandfather of Pourya) with the ingenuity and cooperation of his students: Pahlavan Yavar, who is also Pourya's apprentice in blacksmithing, Pahlavan Safi, who was formerly one of the commanders in the army of Balkh and now engaged in felt-making and Pahlavan Mofrad, who was Ayyar, has now set up a barber shop in the city square, foils the schemes of Eskandar Khan, the greedy and ambitious Darughachi of the city. The lazy and stingy king of city is also present in the series. The story of this collection takes place in the city of Khwarazm, one of the cities of Greater Khorasan, in the 13th century. Each episode is self-contained and has a stand-alone story, though some earlier episodes get referenced from time to time.

== Voice cast ==
- Ali Hemat Momivand as Eskandar
- Bijan Ali Mohammadi as Pourya-ye Vali(Season 1,2,3,4)
- Amir Mohammad Samsami as Yavar
- Zafar Geraei as Mofrad(Season 1,2,3,4)
- Hamidreza Ashtianipour as Safi and Pourya-ye Vali(Season 5)
- Shahrouz Malekarayi as Teymour(Season 1,2,3,4)
- Touraj Nasr as Tooti and Toghrol
- Saeid Sheikh Zadeh as Mofrad(Season 5)
- Shahrad Banki as Teymour(Season 5)
- Mina Ghiaspour as Golrokh
- Hossein Khodadad Beygi
- Valiollah Momeni as Gholam(Season 1,2)
- Siamak Atlasi as Khajeh
- Akbar Manani
- Zhila Ashkan
- Shayesteh Tajbakhsh
- Hadi Jalili
- Amir Manouchehri
- Ali Asghar Rezaeinik
- Naser Khishtandar
- Maryam Nouri Derakhshan
- Mojtaba Fathollahi
- Hasan Kakhi

== Production ==
Alireza Golpayegani described the production of the first season as follows:

The pre-production of this collection lasted 7 months and its production as a group lasted about 2 years. Many people collaborated in the production of this collection. The basis of these stories was laid by Mr. Zarrinabadi in 2004, and the project started in 2005 and ended in 2007. Each episode lasted approximately two months and 10 days, and we produced a total of 13 to 14 minutes per month.

Siavash Zarrinabadi stated the reason for choosing to make the series 2D:

At first, we had a lot of discussions about choosing the technique of working with our friends in the production team, and finally, from various construction methods such as computer 3D, cut-out and single-frame dolls, the two-dimensional method was chosen. In my opinion, despite the problems of using this method, especially in Iran, such as the large number of production team members and the need for a large workspace compared to the three-dimensional method, which requires fewer people and smaller space, the two-dimensional method and its special graphics are more in line with the storytelling style, characters and historical atmosphere of this collection.

== Episode list ==
=== Season 1 ===
No. in season	Title	Original release date
1	"Pahlevan Haydar's Kabbadeh"; Transliteration: "Kabbadeh-ye Pahlevan Haydar" (Persian: کباده پهلوان حیدر)	2008
Mofrad, an Ayyar, arrives in Khwarazm, and helps two poor children steal some food from the city's greediest and most wealthy khajeh, but is then chased by the soldiers and hides in Pahlevan Haydar Khorasani's Zoorkhaneh currently being run by Pahlevan Haydar's grandson Pourya-ye Vali, by awkwardly blending in with its strongmen, Pourya allows Mofrad to stay in Zoorkhaneh for the night despite Yavar's (Pourya's youngest pupil) protests . While there, Pahlevan Haydar's Kabbadeh, which is made of gold and silver, gains his attention which he later steals in order to sell. He is caught by Eskandar and brought before Pourya, who claims that he actually gave him the Kabbadeh since he was in need of money in order to spare him any punishment. Moved by his hospitality and kindness, Mofrad returns the Kabbadeh and becomes one of Pourya's pupils, settling in Khwarazm as a barber.
2	"Safi"; Transliteration: "Safi" (Persian: صفی)	2008
3	"Living Tiger"; Transliteration: "Babr-e Zendeh" (Persian: ببر زنده)	2008
4	"Showman"; Transliteration: "Ma'rekeh Geer" (Persian: معرکه‌گیر)	2008
5	"Stone Mill"; Transliteration: "Sang-e Asyab" (Persian: سنگ آسیاب)	2008
6	"Courier from Khiva"; Transliteration: "Payki az Khiveh" (Persian: پیکی از خیوه)	2008
7	"Unpaid Tax"; Transliteration: "Maliat-e Aghab Oftadeh" (Persian: مالیات عقب‌افتاده)	2008
8	"The Wolves"; Transliteration: "Gorg-ha" (Persian: گرگ‌ها)	2008
9	"Pourya's Sword"; Transliteration: "Shamshir-e Pourya" (Persian: شمشیر پوریا)	2008
10	"Treasure"; Transliteration: "Ganj" (Persian: گنج)	2008
11	"Horse Race"; Transliteration: "Mosabegheh-ye Asb Davani" (Persian: مسابقه اسب‌دوانی)	2008
12	"King's Daughter"; Transliteration: "Dokhtar-e Hākem" (Persian: دختر حاکم)	2008
13	"Horses Thief"; Transliteration: "Dozd-e Asbha" (Persian: دزد اسب ها)	2008

=== Season 2 ===
No. in season	Title	Original release date
1	"Speaker Parrot"; Transliteration: "Tooti-ye Sokhangoo" (Persian: طوطی سخنگو)	TBA
2	"The Black Powder"; Transliteration: "Gard-e Siyah" (Persian: گرد سیاه)	TBA
3	"Jabbar (The unmerciful)" Transliteration: "Jabbar" (Persian: جبار)	TBA
4	"The Promise of a Thief"; Transliteration: "Ghole yek Dozd" (Persian: قول یک دزد)	TBA
5	"The Bail"; Transliteration: "Amanat" (Persian: امانت)	TBA
6	"The War Elephant"; Transliteration: "Fil-e Jangi" (Persian: فیل جنگی)	TBA
7	"Safdar"; Transliteration: "Safdar" (Persian: صفدر)	TBA
8	"The Generosity Contract of Blacksmithery"; Transliteration: "Fotowat Nameh-ye Ahangari" (Persian: فتوت‌نامه آهنگری)	TBA
9	"Sage of Court"; Transliteration: "Hakim-e Darbar" (Persian: حکیم دربار)	TBA
10	"Biography"; Transliteration: "Sharh-e Ahval" (Persian: شرح احوال)	TBA
11	"Eskandar's Treasure"; Transliteration: "Ganj-e Eskandar" (Persian: گنج اسکندر)	TBA
12	"Amir Houshang" (Persian: امیرهوشنگ)	TBA
13	"Alchemist"; Transliteration: "Kimiagar" (Persian: کیمیاگر)	TBA

=== Season 3 ===
No. in season	Title	Original release date
1	"Bandit in Black"; Transliteration: "Ayyar-e Siyahpoosh" (Persian: عیار سیاه‌پوش)	TBA
2	"Will of Khajeh Soheil"; Transliteration: "Vassiyate Khajeh Soheil" (Persian: وصیت خواجه سهیل)	TBA
3	"The Star of Najm al-Zarar"; Transliteration: "Setarey-e Najm al-Zarar" (Persian: ستاره نجم‌الضرر)	TBA
4	"Heritage of Sahhaf"; Transliteration: "Miras-e Sahhaf" (Persian: میراث صحاف)	TBA
5	"Old Rider"; Transliteration: "Kohneh Savar" (Persian: کهنه سوار)	TBA
6	"Belgheis" (Persian: بلقیس)	TBA
7	"Rama and Snakes"; Transliteration: "Rama va Mar-ha" (Persian: راما و مارها)	TBA
8	"Sable"; Transliteration: "Shabdiz" (Persian: شبدیز)	TBA
9	"Saffar" (Persian: صفّار)	TBA
10	"Salar" (Persian: سالار)	TBA
11	"Sacrifice"; Transliteration: "Fadaei" (Persian: فدایی)	TBA
12	"Yavar Blacksmith"; Transliteration: "Ahangari-ye Yavar" (Persian: آهنگری یاور)	TBA
13	"Luggage of Earth"; Transliteration: "Bar-e Donya" (Persian: بار دنیا)	TBA

=== Season 4 ===
No. in season	Title	Original release date
1	"Thief of Basra"; Transliteration: "Tarrar-e Basreh" (Persian: طرار بصره)	TBA
2	"Shams the Flier"; Transliteration: "Shamss-e Parandeh" (Persian: شمس پرنده)	TBA
3	"The Boar"; Transliteration: "Khenzir" (Persian: خنزیر)	TBA
4	"Farrokhlaqa"; Transliteration: "Farrokhlaqa" (Persian: فرخ‌لقا)	TBA
5	"Tablet of Nacrotic"; Transliteration: "Habb-e Flonia" (Persian: حبّ فلونیا)	TBA
6	"Lapidary"; Transliteration: "Gowhar Tarash" (Persian: گوهرتراش)	TBA
7	"Sadhu"; Transliteration: "Mortaz" (Persian: مرتاض)	TBA
8	"Khalil the Miller"; Transliteration: "Khalil-e Asyaban" (Persian: خلیل آسیابان)	TBA
9	"Bear Hunter"; Transliteration: "Shekarchi-e Khers" (Persian: شکارچی خرس)	TBA
10	"Return to Balkh"; Transliteration: "Bazgasht be Balkh" (Persian: بازگشت به بلخ)	TBA
11	"The Clown"; Transliteration: "Dalqak" (Persian: دلقک)	TBA
12	"The Falcon"; Transliteration: "Qush" (Persian: قوش)	TBA
13	"Repentance of Taymur"; Transliteration: "Tobeh-ye Taymur" (Persian: توبه تیمور)	TBA

=== Season 5 ===
No. in season	Title	Original release date
1	"Golrokh" (Persian: گلرخ)	March 21, 2022
2	"Azhdar" (Persian: اژدر)	March 22, 2022
3	"Firuz and Piruz"; Transliteration: "Firuz va Piruz" (Persian: فیروز و پیروز)	March 23, 2022
4	"Antelope"; Transliteration: "Boz-e Koohi" (Persian: بز کوهی)	March 24, 2022
5	"Elephant on Shoulder"; Transliteration: "Fil bar Dush" (Persian: فیل بر دوش)	March 25, 2022
6	"Heshmat the Athlete"; Transliteration: "Pahlevan Heshmat" (Persian: پهلوان حشمت)	March 26, 2022
7	"Praiser"; Transliteration: "Madiheh Gu" (Persian: مدیحه‌گو)	March 27, 2022
8	"Story of Two Cities"; Transliteration: "Dastan-e Do Shahr" (Persian: داستان دو شهر)	March 21, 2023
9	"Iron Pen-Case"; Transliteration: "Qalamdan-e Ahani" (Persian: قلمدان آهنی)	March 22, 2023
10	"Commander Tahmasb"; Transliteration: "Farmandeh Tahmasab" (Persian: فرمانده طهماسب)	March 23, 2023
11	"The New Disciple"; Transliteration: "No Morid" (Persian: نومرید)	March 24, 2023
12	"Senior of Merchants"; Transliteration: "Malek ot-Tojjar" (Persian: مَلِک التجّار)	March 25, 2023
13	"The Fake King"; Transliteration: "Hakem-e Qollabi" (Persian: حاکم قلّابی)	March 26, 2023

=== Season 6 ===
No. in season	Title	Original release date
1	"The New Sheriff"; Transliteration: "Darughe-ye Jadid" (Persian: داروغۀ جدید)	March 21, 2024
2	"Safe deposit box" Transliteration: "Sanduq-e Amanaat" (Persian: صندوق امانات)	March 22, 2024
3	"Nur the son of Mir Salah"; Transliteration: "Nur Pesar-e Mir Salah" (Persian: نور پسر میرصلاح)	March 23, 2024
4	"Magic Buttons"; Transliteration: "Dokmeha-ye Jaduyi" (Persian: دکمه‌های جادویی)	March 24, 2024
5	"The Gold Maker"; Transliteration: "Talaa saaz" (Persian: طلاساز)	March 25, 2024
6	"Mo`ayyer"; Transliteration: "Mo`ayyer" (Persian: معیّر)	March 21, 2025
7	"Dedicated to the Zurkhaneh"; Transliteration: "Vaqf-e Zurkhaneh" (Persian: وقف زورخانه)	March 22, 2025
8	"The Brave Head"; Transliteration: "Sar-e Natars" (Persian: سرِ نترس)	March 23, 2025
9	"Seyf od-Din"; Transliteration: "Seyf od-Din" (Persian: صف‌الدّین)	March 24, 2025
10	"The King Thief"; Transliteration: "Shaah Dozd" (Persian: شاه دزد)	March 25, 2025
11	"The Raging River"; Transliteration: "Rudkhane-ye Khorushaan" (Persian: رودخانۀ خروشان)	March 26, 2025
12	"Anger and Regret"; Transliteration: "Khashm vd Pashimaani" (Persian: خشم و پشیمانی)	March 27, 2025
13	"Hero of the City"; Transliteration: "Qahreman-e Shahr" (Persian: قهرمان شهر)	March 28, 2025

== Awards ==
- The award for the best director of the series in the third Jam-e-Jam Television Festival (Siavash Zarrinabadi)
