= Muhammad Aminkhan Madrasah =

Madrasa in Khiva, Khorazm, Uzbekistan

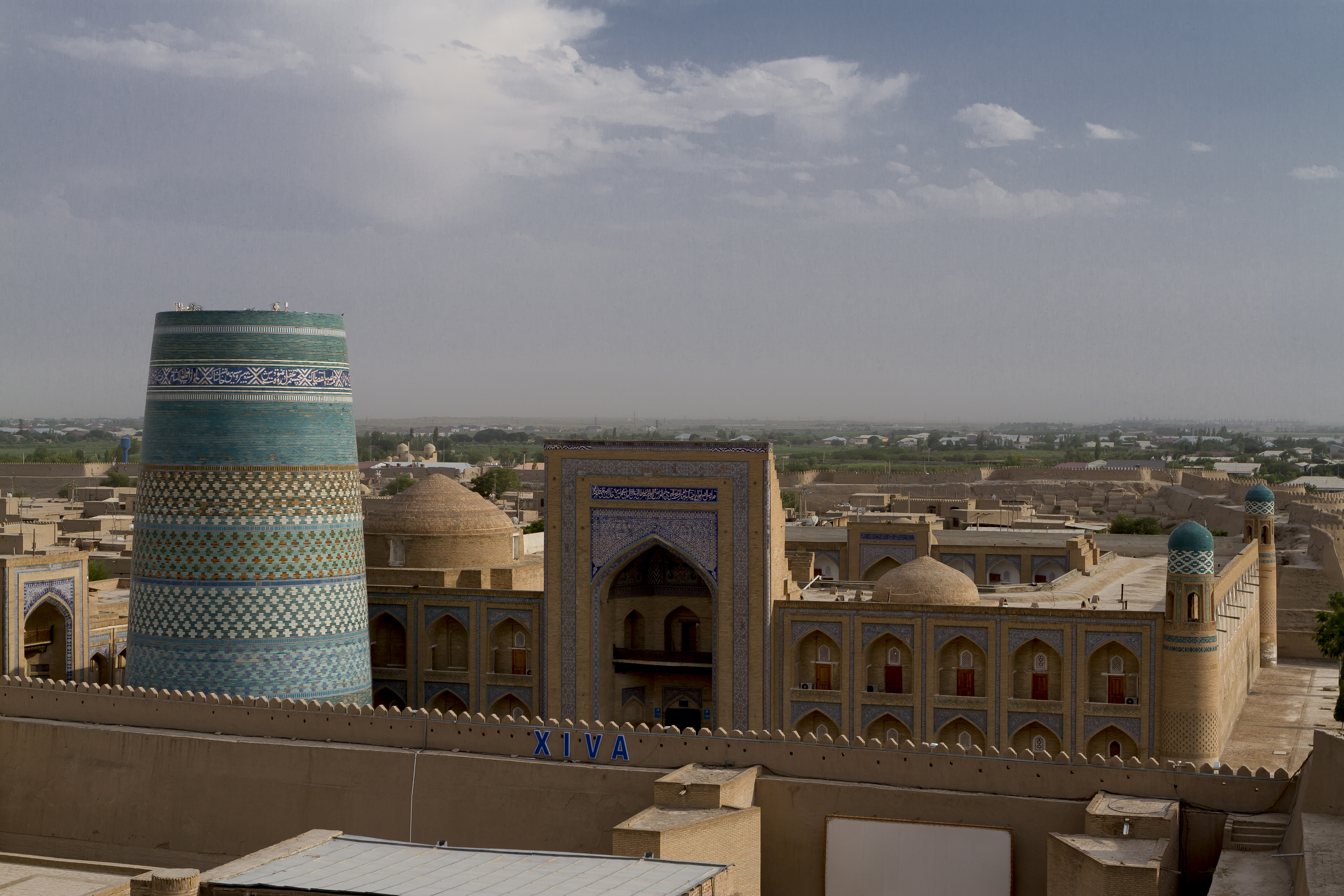
- Interactive map of the Muhammad Aminkhan Madrasah area

General information
- Location: 41 Boltayeva Street, Itchan Kala, Khiva, Khorazm Region, Uzbekistan
- Coordinates: 41.3780°N 60.3575°E
- Construction started: 1852
- Completed: 1855
- Owner: State property

Technical details
- Material: brick
- Floor count: 2
- Floor area: 77×60.0 m

Muhammad Aminkhan Madrasah is an architectural monument in Khiva (1852–1855). Built by Muhammad Amin Bahadur Khan. The Madrasah is located in the western part of the Itchan Kala. It was built in 1852–1855 with the funds and decree of the Uzbek ruler Muhammad Aminkhan. Muhammad Aminkhan Madrasah is the largest and most tiled in comparison to other Khiva madrasahs.

In 1990 it was included in the list of UNESCO World Heritage Sites as a part of Itchan Kala. Currently, it is used as a tourist service and exhibition space. Khiva tourist complex hotel is located there.

== History ==
In 1851 Muhammad Amin Khan announced a competition to create a madrasah design. In the competition, the project drawn by the master Abdulla "jin" was approved by the khan.

In the fourth year of his rule, the ruler of Khorezm, Muhammad Aminkhan (1846–1855), ordered the construction of a madrasa and a minaret in front of the western gate of the Itchan Kala. The construction of the madrasa was completed in three years .

In 1852 the construction of a magnificent minaret began at the Madrasah of Muhammad Aminkhan, according to the Khan's plan, it was supposed to be taller than all the minarets in Central Asia. It remained unfinished, hence it is now called the Short Tower.

Several famous personalities of the time, Laffasi, Mutrib Khonakharobi, Sufi and others studied at the madrasa.

Since 1979 the Muhammad Aminkhan Madrasah together with the Matniyoz Devonbegi Madrasah has established the Khiva tourist complex adapted to serve local and foreign tourists. There is a hotel in the first building, and a restaurant in the second.

In 1990 the madrasa, along with other monuments of Itchan Kala, was included in the UNESCO World Heritage List. The madrasah was built of baked bricks, the walls are 1.5 meters thick. The madrasah has 2 floors, 130 rooms, and according to historical data, 260 students studied in it at the same time.

== Architecture ==
Madrasa has two floors. Rooms on the first floor have a corridor, and those on the second floor have an antechamber. This style was used for the first time in the architecture of Khiva madrasas in this building. The construction of the porches is simple, it complements the overall architecture of the yard. The eaves and opposite gables of the two-story porches are decorated with glazed rivets. The roof of the cells is covered with a balkhi dome. The domes of the mosque in the eastern wing and the classroom in the western wing are placed on a sloping platform. The 6-sided arch of the gable is also decorated with lacquer rivets. The high dome of the mosque rises much higher than the gable. The high and decorative roof of the madrasa is divided into unique small arches, and the mezana patterns in the corners give the building strength and beauty. The best examples of styles characteristic of the Khiva school of architecture is used in the building. The capital-style mionsaray is divided into 2-roofed, 5-domed sections. The wood-carved doors and railings are unique works of art. General layout – 77 × 60.0 m; yard 38.0 × 38.0 m; mosque 9.4 × 8.4 m; classroom 5.6 × 5.6 m. In the past it was a large educational institution and a city hall. The madrasah was renovated and converted into a hotel. Madrasah is connected to Kaltaminor by a small wooden bridge.

== Gallery ==
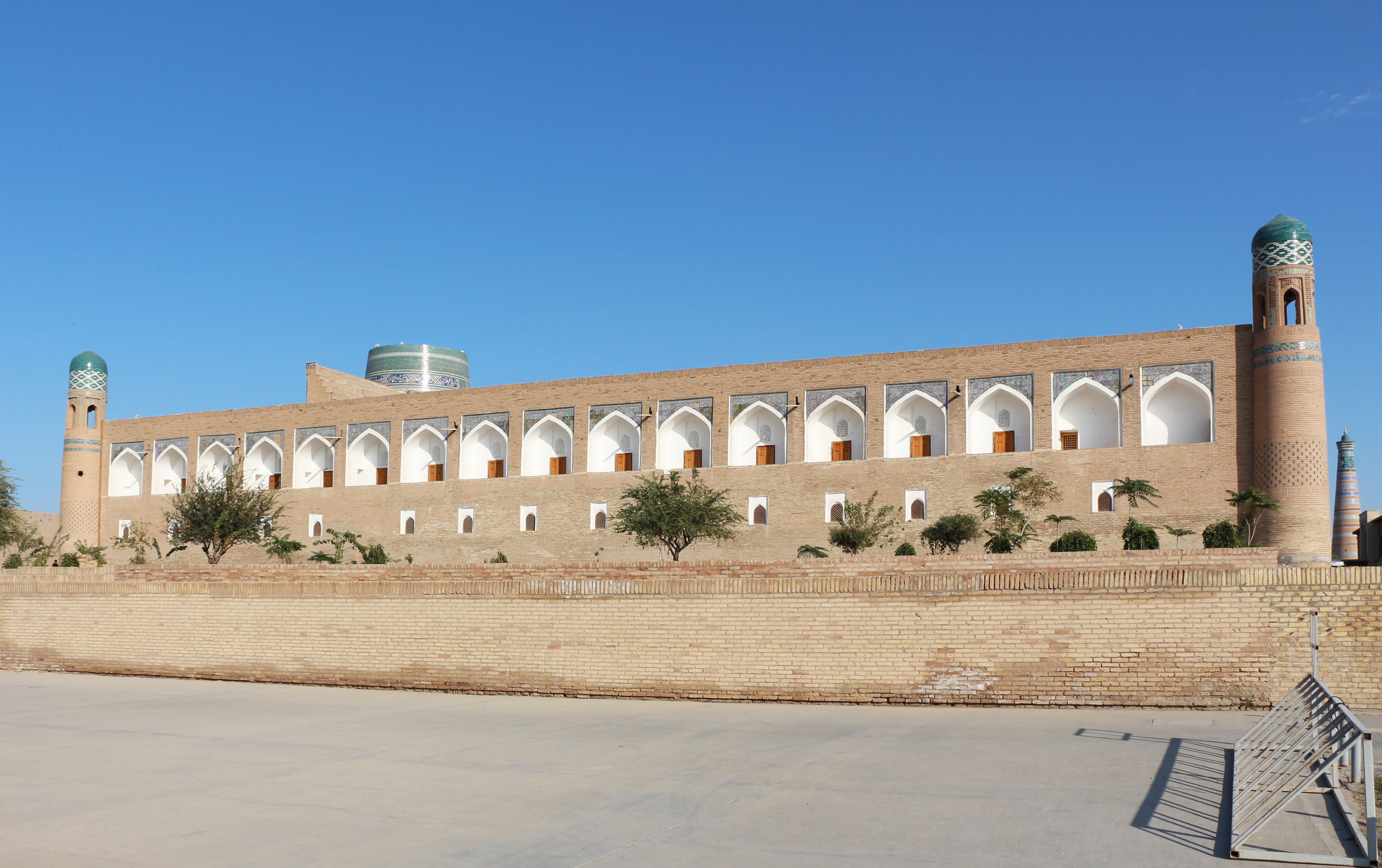

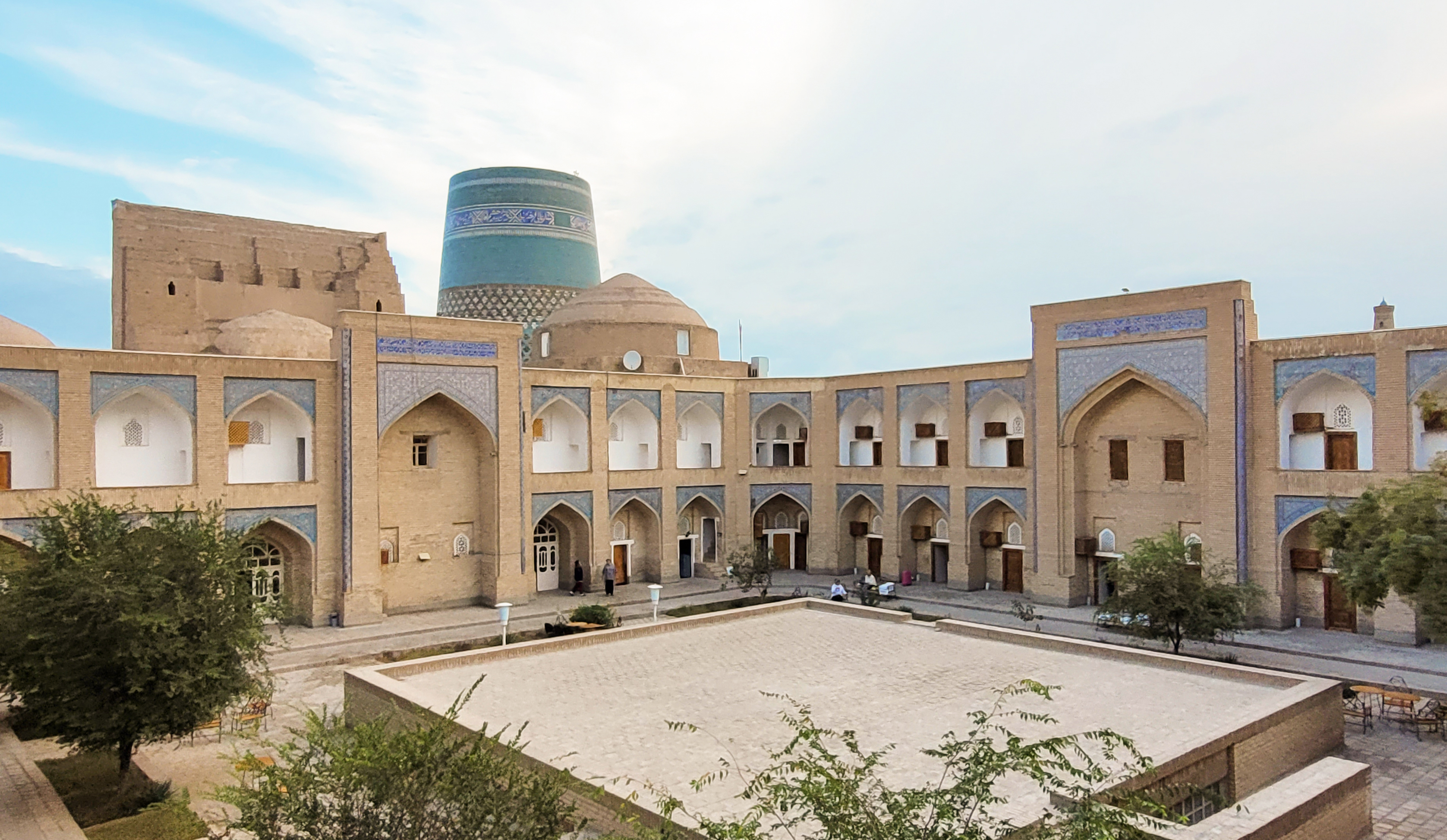

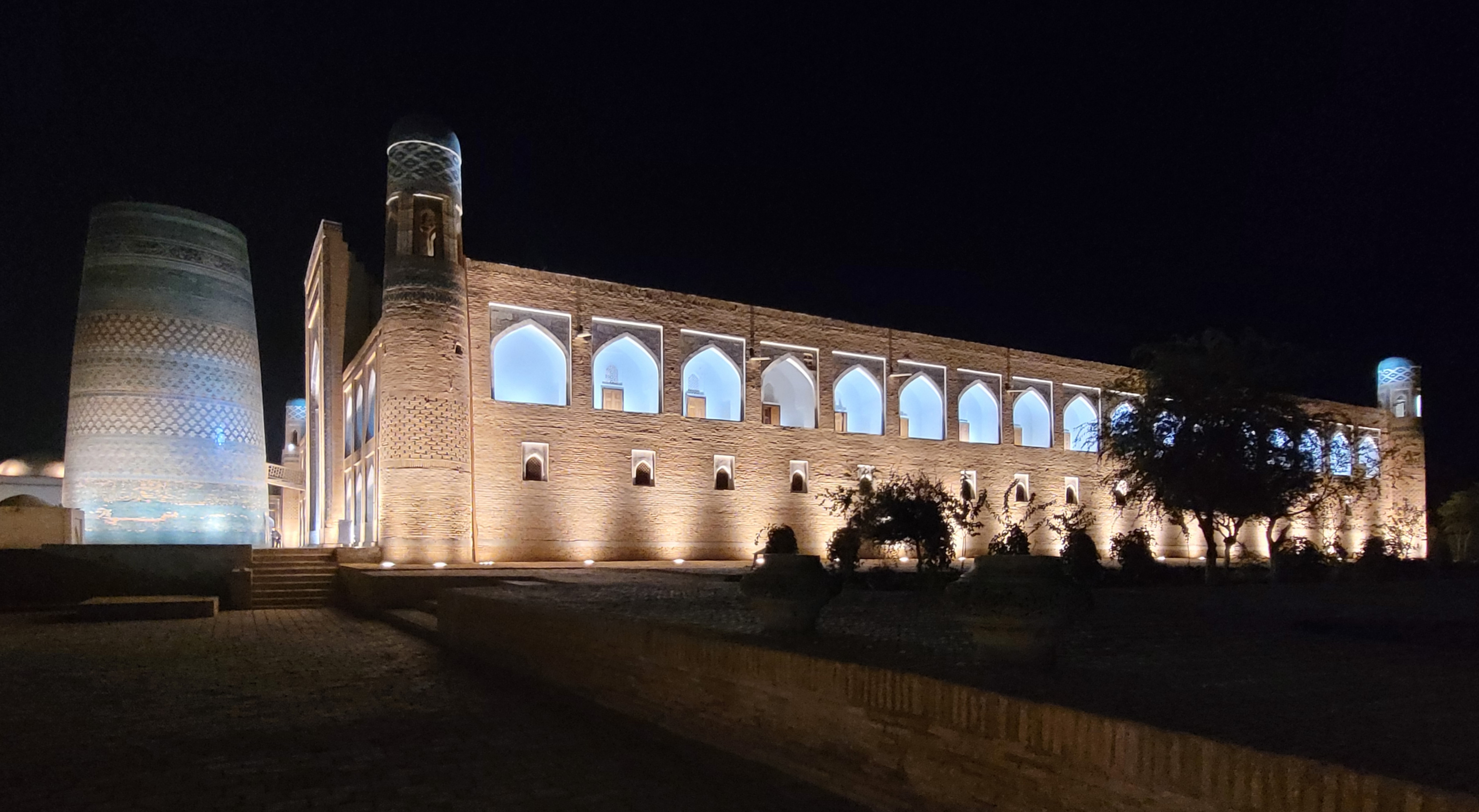

== See also ==
- Arab Muhammadkhan Madrasah
- Yusuf Yasovulboshi Madrasah
- Matniyoz Devonbegi Madrasah
