= Matniyoz Devonbegi Madrasah =

Madrasa in Khiva, Khorazm, Uzbekistan

- Muhammad Niyoz Devonbegi Madrasah
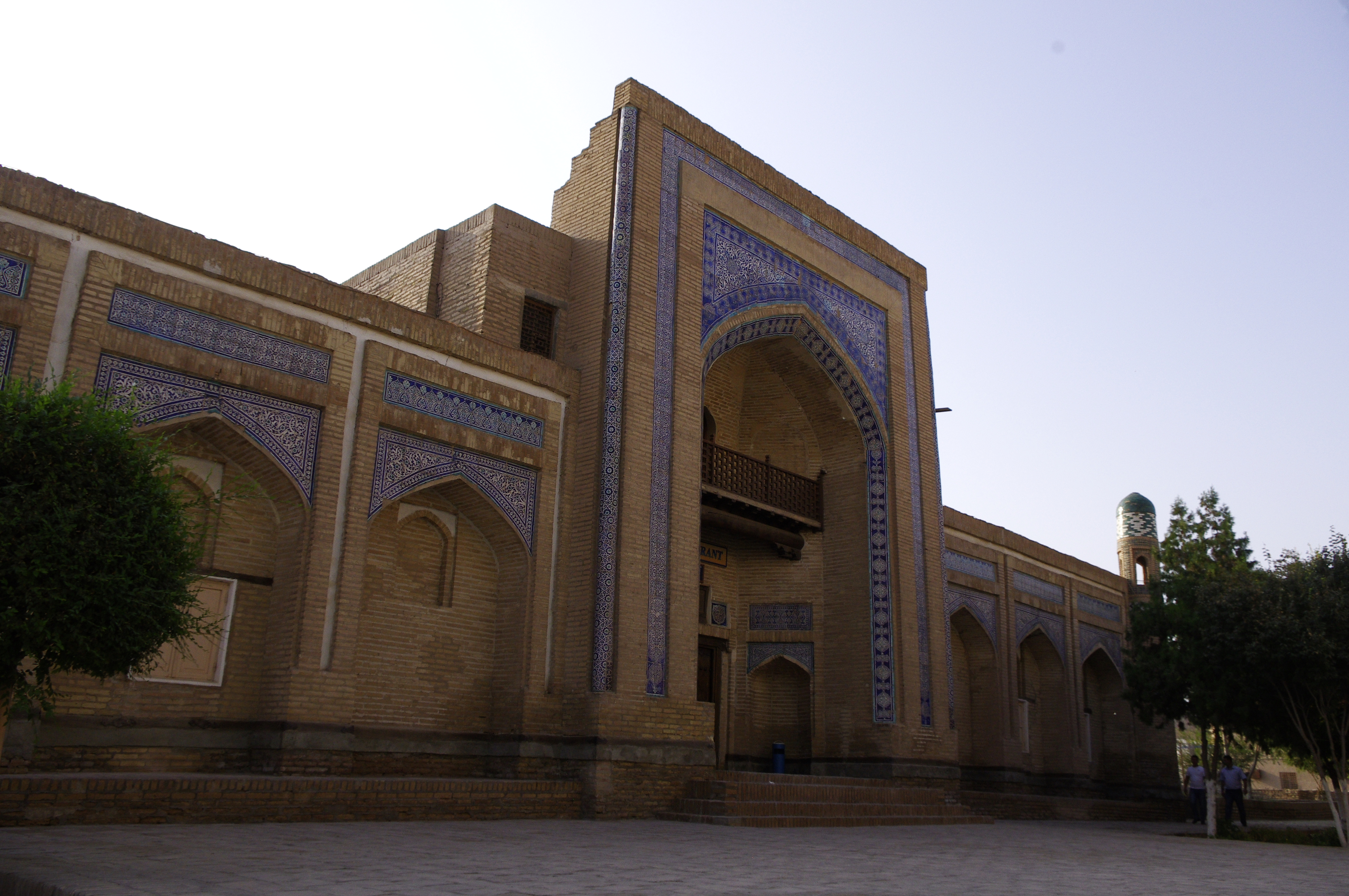
- Interactive map of the Matniyoz Devonbegi Madrasah area

General information
- Location: 19 Pahlavon Mahmud Street, Itchan Kala, Khiva, Khorazm Region, Uzbekistan
- Coordinates: 41.37822390549404°N 60.358276187650375°E
- Year built: 1871
- Owner: State Heritage

Height
- Height: 36.45 m

Technical details
- Material: brick
- Floor count: 1
- Floor area: 21 × 17 m

References
- Matniyoz Devonbegi Madrasah in map

Matniyoz Devonbegi Madrasah (Muhammad Niyoz Devonbegi Madrasah) is an architectural monument in the city of Khiva, Khorazm Region. The madrasah was built in 1871, and today it is located at 19, Pahlavon Mahmud Street, "Itchan Kala" neighborhood of Khiva. The historical object "Itchan Kala" state museum-reserve belongs to the state property based on the right of operational management.

The madrasa was built in 1871 during the reign of the Uzbek ruler Muhammad Rahim Khan II by his high-ranking official, the minister of finance – Muhammad Niyoz (in dialect Matniyoz) devonbegi at his own expense. It is located in front of the eastern wall of Muhammad Rahimkhan Madrasah.

Madrasah was included in the UNESCO World Heritage List in 1990 as a part of the Itchan Kala. Currently, it is a tourist service and exhibition facility, where the Khiva tourist complex restaurant is located. Since 1979, the facility has been adapted to serve local and foreign tourists together with the Muhammad Aminkhan Madrasah.

== Architecture ==
The main facade is faced the Muhammad Aminkhan Madrasah. The madrasah is one-story, rectangular in shape (36.45 × 31.8 m). It originally consisted of classrooms, a winter mosque and a courtyard, surrounded by cells. Their total number is 19 (the remaining 2 rooms are located on the second floor). The rooms are located around the courtyard (21 × 17 m). The main facade has a huge pediment, 3 arched arches are made on its sides. The top of the minarets in the corners is finished with domed mezzanines. It is entered through a carved wooden door. The dome of mionsaray rested on shield-shaped arches. There are classrooms connected to the courtyard next to the mionsaray. The rooms around the yard have arched fronts. The gable-domed mosque on the south side was used as a porch. The domes of the classroom and the mosque are placed on intersecting arches, and the rooms are vaulted. The main style is decorated in the typical style of Khorezm architecture (with blue, white and air-colored tiles).

Above the entrance door to the madrasa, the dedicatory verses are written in Nastaliq script. They are written by the Khorezm historian and poet Ogahi.

In another source, it is mentioned that a text was written in Arabic script on the marble stone above the door, and this text was completed by Khudaibergan Devon under the signature of Devoni in 1871 (1288 Hijri).
