= Khiva District =

Coordinates: 41°23′N 60°22′E

Khiva District Xiva tumani
- District
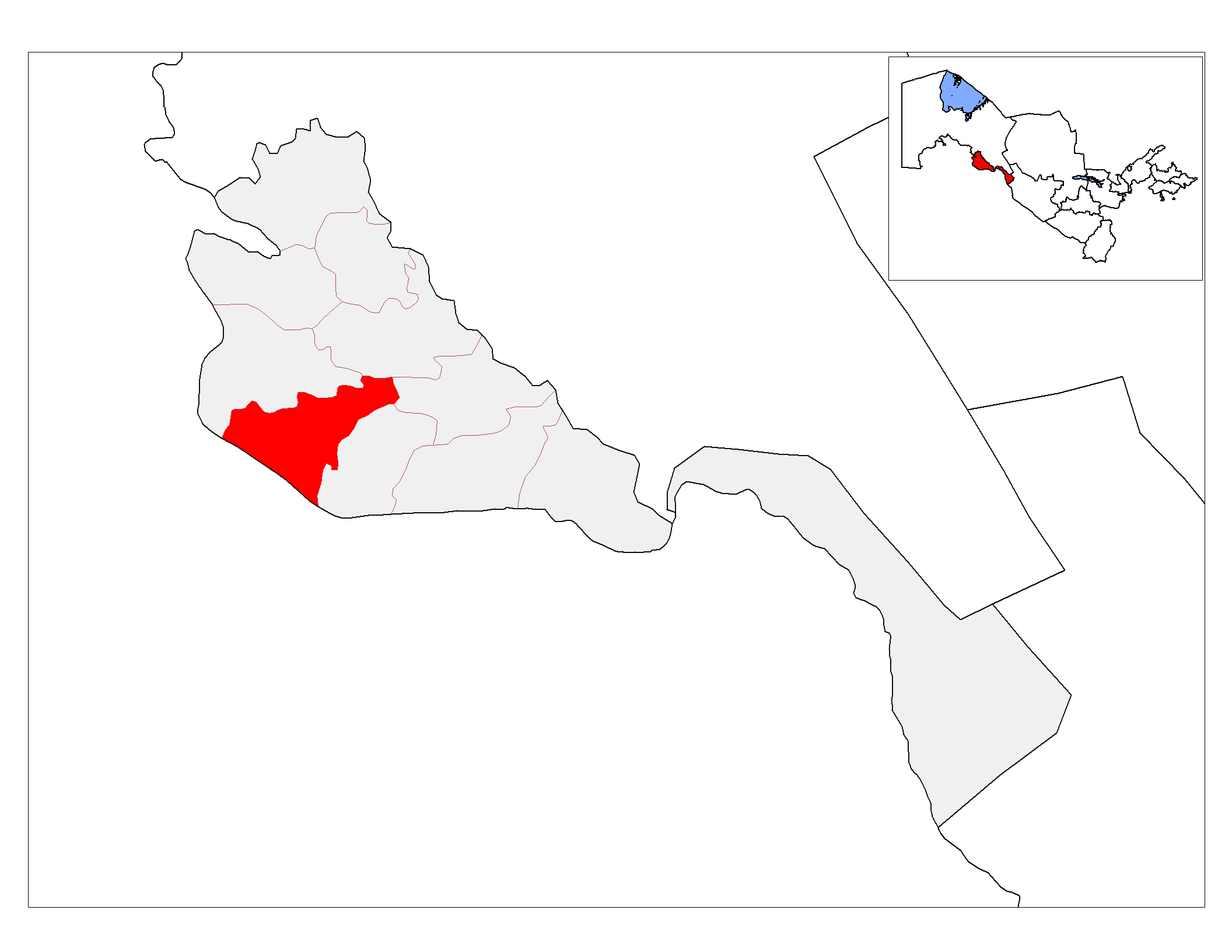
- Country: Uzbekistan
- Region: Xorazm Region
- Capital: Khiva

Area
  - Total: 430 km^{2} (170 sq mi)

Population (2021)
  - Total: 147,400
  - Density: 340/km^{2} (890/sq mi)
- Time zone: UTC+5 (UZT)

Khiva District (Uzbek: Xiva tumani, Хива тумани, خیوه تومنى) is a district in the Xorazm Region of Uzbekistan. The district's administrative center is the city of Khiva, which is not part of the district itself. khiva district covers an area of 430 km^{2} (170 sq mi) and had a population of 147,400 inhabitants in 2021. It comprises six urban-type settlements (Gullanbogʻ, Parchanxos, Iftixor, Shoʻr-Qalʻa, Yuqori qoʻm, Hamkor) and nine rural communities.
