= Sheikh Mavlon Complex =

- Interactive map of the Sheikh Mavlon Complex area

General information
- Location: Qiyat village, Khiva District, Khorazm Region, Uzbekistan
- Coordinates: 41.426106861794°N 60.37315300976579°E
- Year built: XIX century
- Owner: State Heritage

Height
- Height: 11m

Technical details
- Material: brick, wood
- Floor area: 120m2

Sheikh Mavlon Complex is a historical object consisting of a mosque, a cemetery and a minaret, located near the old village of Qiyat, Khiva District, Khorezm region. In the 19th century, a minaret, a mosque and a madrasah were built in this area, which was originally a cemetery, by order of Alla-Kuli-Khan. The cemetery, which is the foundation of the complex, contains the graves of Ogahi and his uncle, Shermuhammad Munis, a historian and translator who was a secretary in the Khiva Khanate. The complex is included in the UNESCO World Heritage List. At the moment, this complex is part of the Itchan Kala Museum-Reserve.

On 4 October 2019, by the decision of the Cabinet of Ministers of the Republic of Uzbekistan, the historical object was included in the national list of real estate objects of tangible cultural heritage and received state protection. Currently, Khorazm Region Culture Department belongs to the state property based on the right of operational management.

== Reconstruction ==
The mausoleum with Ogahi's tomb, located in the complex of Sheikh Mavlon, was reconstructed in 1989–1999, its area is 120 square meters, and its height is 11 meters. The complex was also renovated in 1999 and 2010 in connection with the 190th and 200th anniversary of Ogahi.

In 2021, employees of the "Laboratory of Testing and Repair of Construction Materials of Southern Aral Historical Architectural Monuments" department of the Khorazm Mamun Academy conducted monitoring of the underground and above-ground structural conditions of the Sheikh Mavlon complex, among many historical objects.

== See also ==
- Khiva
