= Ogahi (poet) =

Uzbek poet

Muhammad Riza Erniyozbek oglu
- محمد رضا آگهی
- Born: 17 December 1809; Khorezm
- Died: 14 December 1874 (aged 64)
- Occupation: Khanate of Khiva
- Writing career
- Pen name: Ogahi

Muhammad Riza Erniyozbek oglu (17 December 1809 – 14 December 1874), better known by his pen name Ogahi (Uzbek: Ogahiy), was an Uzbek poet, historian, and translator.

== Life ==
Ogahi was born in 1809 in Qiyot village near Khiva. He studied in Khiva madrasahs. He mastered Arabic, Persian, and Turkish languages.

After the death of his uncle and teacher Munis Khwarazmi in 1829, Allakuli Khan (Khan of Khiva in 1825–1842) appointed Ogahi as the successor of Munis to the position of mirab (A profession engaged in the distribution of water to agricultural lands). In 1845, he fell from a horse and his leg paralyzed. In 1857, he resigned from the position of a mirab. Until the end of his life, he lived in a sick condition.

== Family ==
Muhammad Riza, who lost his father early, was brought up and taught by his uncle, the famous historian and poet Shir Muhammad ibn Amir Iwaz-biy, nicknamed as Munis.

== Works ==
At the age of 52–55, Ogahi created the collection "Lovers' Talisman". He is the author of historical works "Riyaz ud-Davla", "Zubdat ut-Tavorikh", "Jomi ul-Vakiati Sultani", "Gulshani State" and "Shahid ul-Ikbol". The work "Riyaz ud-Davla" described the history of Khorezm in 1825–1842. The history of Khorezm in 1843–1846 was described in "Zubdat ut-Tawarikh". "Jami ul-Wakiati Sultani" was devoted to the history of Khorezm in 1846–1855. "Gulshani State" covered the history of 1856–1865 years. Ogahi's last work "Shahid ul-Iqbal" was dedicated to the years 1865–1872. Ogahi became famous for his poetic translations of the works of Nizami Ganjavi, Amir Khusraf Dehlavi, Sa'di, Jami, Hilali and others into Uzbek.
