= Avesta Architectural Complex =

- "Avesta" garden-complex
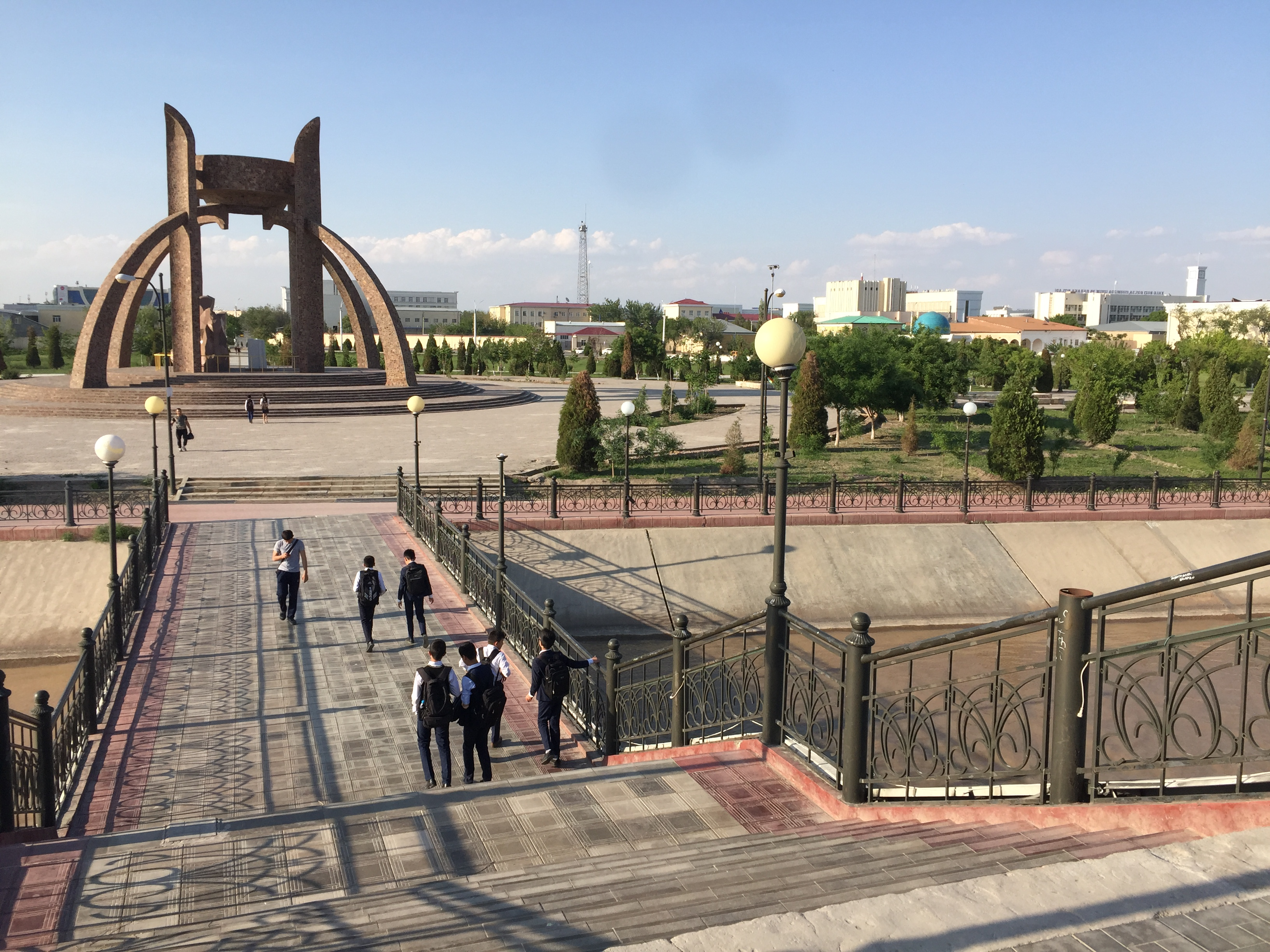
- Interactive map of the Avesta Architectural Complex area

General information
- Location: Al-Khorazmi street, Urgench city, Khorazm Region, Uzbekistan
- Coordinates: 41.547184685303094°N 60.6261928962799°E
- Year built: 2001
- Owner: State Heritage

Technical details
- Floor area: 20 hectares

Design and construction
- Architect: Polvonnazar Solayev

References
- Avesta Architectural Complex in map

Avesta architectural complex (or "Avesta" garden-complex) is a complex consisting of a garden and a monumental object located on Al-Khorazmi street, Urgench city, Khorazm Region. The complex was created in Khorazm in 2001 before the celebration of the 2700th anniversary of "Avesta". The complex is state property based on the right of operational management of the Department of Culture of the Khorazm region.

== History ==
On the initiative of the government of Uzbekistan, the 30th session of the UNESCO General Conference decided to celebrate the 2700th anniversary of the creation of "Avesta" on a global scale. In the decision, the events of the celebration of the 2700th anniversary of "Avesta" were determined. After that, a park and the "Avesta" monument were built in the city of Urganch, Khorazm. In October 2001, an international scientific conference dedicated to "Avesta" and festive events took place in Uzbekistan.

== Structure ==
An enlarged copy of the book "Avesta" was installed in the monument. White and red colors were mainly used to decorate the copy of the book in the monument. According to the Avesta, red color is a symbol of burning fire and blood flowing in veins, while white color is a symbol of light.

The total area of the complex is 20 hectares. The Avesta monument, an amphitheater, recreation centers and a garden are located on the territory of the complex. The height of the monument of Avesta is 16 meters, and the project was created by the architect Polvonnazar Solayev.

The Avesta architectural complex houses a museum belonging to the Khorazm regional branch of the "Golden Heritage" international fund. The museum consists of 8 departments, where more than 2,000 exhibits depicting the history of Khorazm and the period when "Avesta" was created, as well as handicrafts and ceramics, and many books in Arabic script are stored.
