= Pahlavon Mahmud Complex =

Momerial monument in Khiva

Coordinates: 41.3769°N 60.3594°E

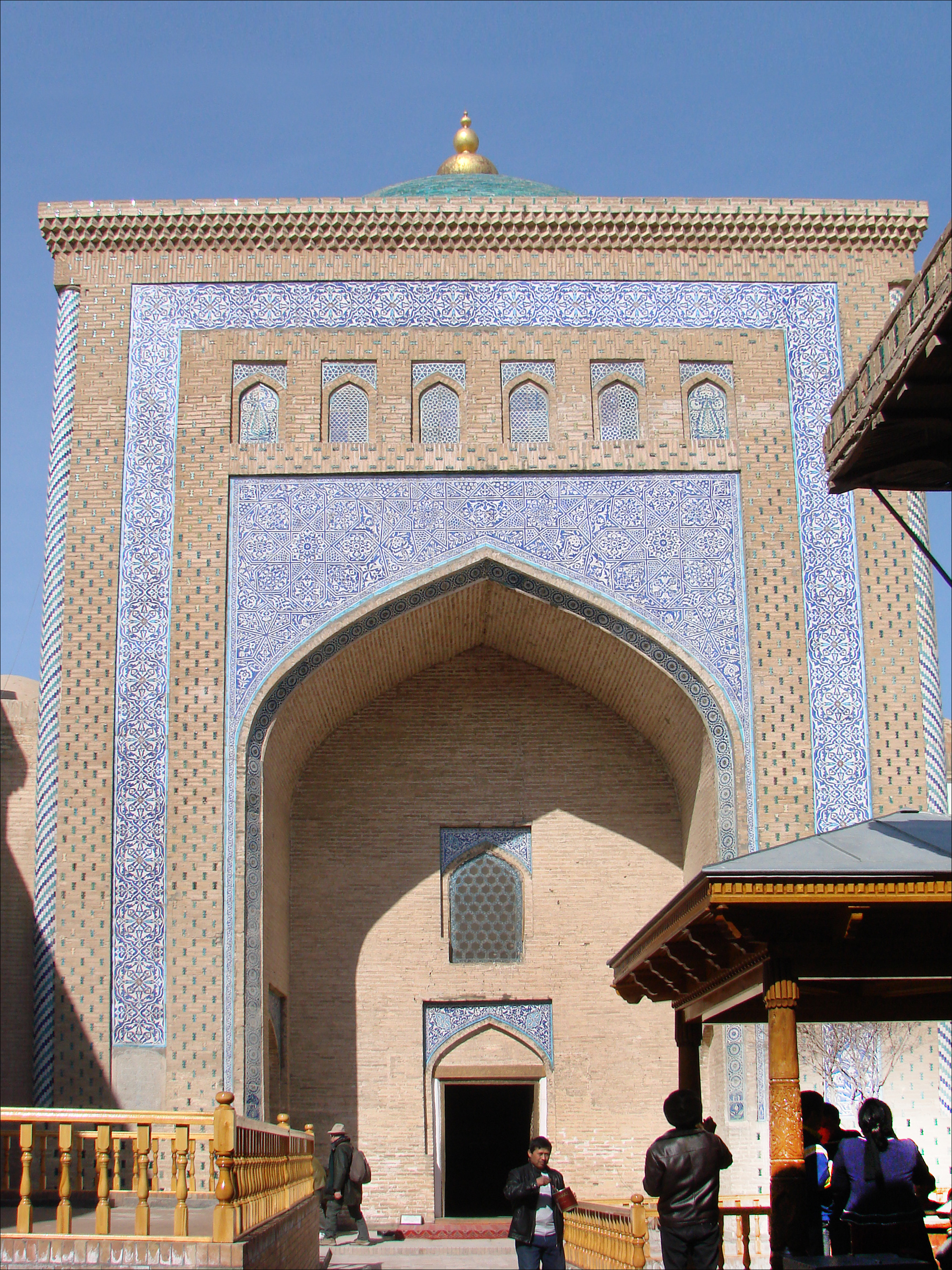
Pahlavon Mahmud Mausoleum

The Pahlavon Mahmud complex, Pahlavon Mahmud mausoleum or Polvon ota mausoleum is a memorial monument in Khiva, Khorezm. The mausoleum complex has a total area of 50x30m, and was originally built in 1664 as a miraculous dome over the grave of Pahlavon Mahmud. Pahlavon Mahmud (1247-1326) was a local poet who emerged from humble craftsmen, and was also famous for his heroic strength as an unbeatable wrestler, and his ability to heal people. His tomb has been and is still considered a sacred place by representatives of Uzbeks, Turkmens, Karakalpaks and other peoples. This complex is also known in Khiva as “Hazrati Pahlavon Pir”.

According to his will, Pahlavon Mahmud was buried in his own leather workshop. Over time, this place became a respected pilgrimage site and later a complex named after him was built.

== Myths ==
Pahlavon Mahmud lived in the 13th century and was a local poet who emerged from humble craftsmen, and was also famous for his heroic strength as an unbeatable wrestler, and his ability to heal people. His grave was in the cemetery behind the Juma Mosque. Many details of Pahlavon Mahmud’s life and activities are described in local oral literature. He has been revered as the patron of the city since ancient times.

== Construction ==
Initially, the mausoleum building was modest, but as this place became a famous pilgrimage site, mosques and khanaqahs were built here. Pilgrims also prayed around the mausoleum, and there were also houses for living and other rooms for pilgrims. Gradually, the mausoleum turned into a wonderful structure with the largest dome in Khiva, covered with blue glazed tiles with a sloping top. During the reign of Allah Kuli Khan, the building was decorated with ceramic tiles.

According to the inscription on the gatehouse, the construction date of the P. Pahlavon Mahmud complex is considered to be 1701, when Shohniyoz Khan built it. In 1825-1835, in its place, a wooden domed mausoleum (17.5x25.5 m), a ziyaratkhana (9X9 m) and a khanaqah (4x4 m) were erected. Later, Khiva khans (Abulgazi Khan, 1643–63; Shohniyoz Khan, 1695-1702; Muhammad Rahim Khan I, 1806–25; Temurghazi Khan, 1857-58 and others) were also buried here. In 1913, under the leadership of master Kurbonniyoz, a two-storey madrasah was built on the west side of the courtyard, and a columned veranda opposite it. The mausoleum consists of three parts: Khanaqah, tomb and corridor. Pahlavon Mahmud was buried in the room located on the western side of the mausoleum. Muhammad Rahim Khan was placed next to the wall of the northern part of the khanaqah. Near him, tombstones of Khiva khans Abulgazi Khan and Anusha Khan were placed. Allah Kuli Khan was buried in the corridor. By the end of the 19th century, the Pahlavon Mahmud complex had turned into a burial place for Khiva khans and their close relatives. During the reign of Asfandiyar Khan (1910-1918), a two-storey Qorikhon mosque was built on the western side of the courtyard, and a summer mosque on the eastern side.

== Architecture ==
The complex is entered through a gatehouse on the south side, which leads to an inner courtyard covered with wood. On the outside, there is a well, a small courtyard opposite a domed khanaqah-mausoleum, a veranda on the right, a pool and a madrasah on the left. The khanaqah's dome is decorated with glazed tiles in blue and white, and has two floral medallions on each side. The dome's ornamentation is mainly made of blue glazed bricks. The interior of the building is finely decorated. From its entrance to the domed ceiling, it is covered with white and blue patterns. The inscription between the ornaments contains Pahlavon Mahmud's Rubaiyat. The Ziyaratkhana is accessed through the western door of the khanaqah. There is a glazed sarcophagus of Pahlavon Mahmud. The main buildings of the P. Pahlavon Mahmud complex were built under the leadership of Odina Muhammad Murod. The ornaments were made by Mulla Nurmuhammad Kalandar's son, Sofimuhammad Abdujabbar's son and Abdulla "jin". The Ziyaratkhana door (1810) and the outer door (1894) were made by master Nurmuhammad. In 1960, the madrasah and the veranda were repaired with the participation of master Rozimat Masharipov. The Pahlavon Mahmud complex is a vivid example of the 19th century Khiva architectural style.

=== Architectural ensemble ===
A complex of monuments built at different times (1664-1913) was formed around the tomb of Pahlavon Mahmud. Its overall dimensions are relatively large (50x30 meters), and the first to appear here was a small mausoleum over the tomb of Pahlavon Mahmud in 1664. In the XVII century, the entrance portal to the mausoleum was built on the southern side.

According to the inscriptions on the door, more extensive construction began in 1701 by Shahniyaz Khan (1698-1702). In 1719, Shergazi-khan, building a new madrasa to the south of the cemetery, orientated it towards the Mausoleum of Pahlavon Mahmud.

In 1810, after a successful campaign to Kungrad, Muhammad Rahim-khan I decided to radically change the ensemble. Later the structure extended eastwards and partly southwards from the original mausoleum. In 1810-1825 a richly decorated mausoleum, a room for pilgrims (ziarat-khana) and a khanqah were erected. Members of the khan family were buried in the family crypt attached to the mausoleum. Some rulers of Khwarazm were buried here: Abulgazi-khan, Shahniyaz-khan, Temur Gazi-khan, Muhammad Rahim-khan I.

The marble tombstones of Abulgazi-khan (1663) and Anush-khan (1681) were moved to the new building and were installed next to the burial niche of Muhammad Rahim-khan I.

In 1913, two rooms for Quran reciters (kari-khana) were built in the western part of the complex and a terrace was built opposite. Also, a two-storey building was built in the courtyard in front of the mausoleum. The burial vaults of Isfandiyar Khan's mother and sons, as well as the burial place of Isfandiyar himself, are located in the rooms of this building.

== See also ==
- Itchan Kala
- Dishan Kala
