= Urgench =

City in Khorezm Region, western Uzbekistan

Urgench Urganch / گرگانج
- City
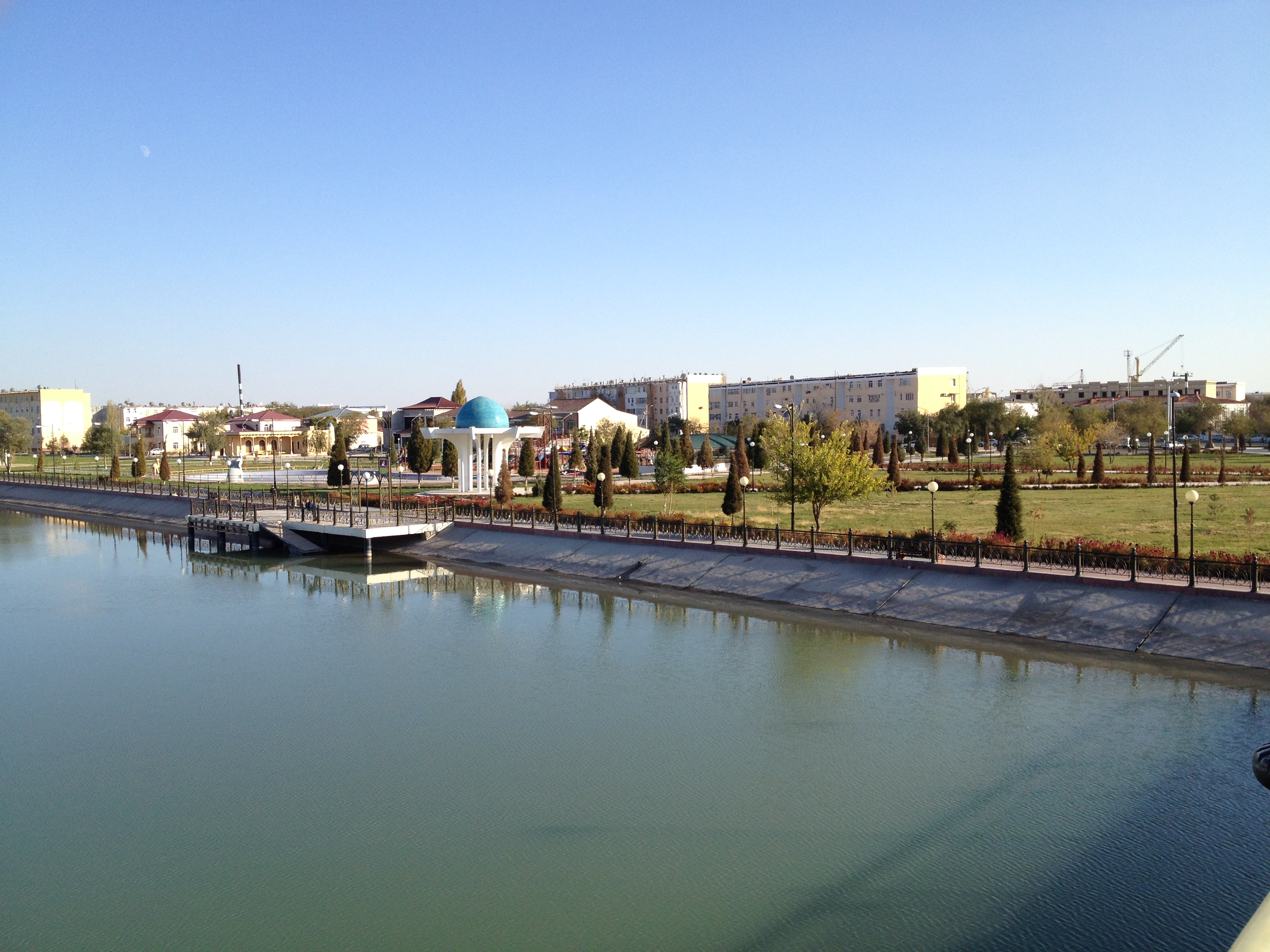
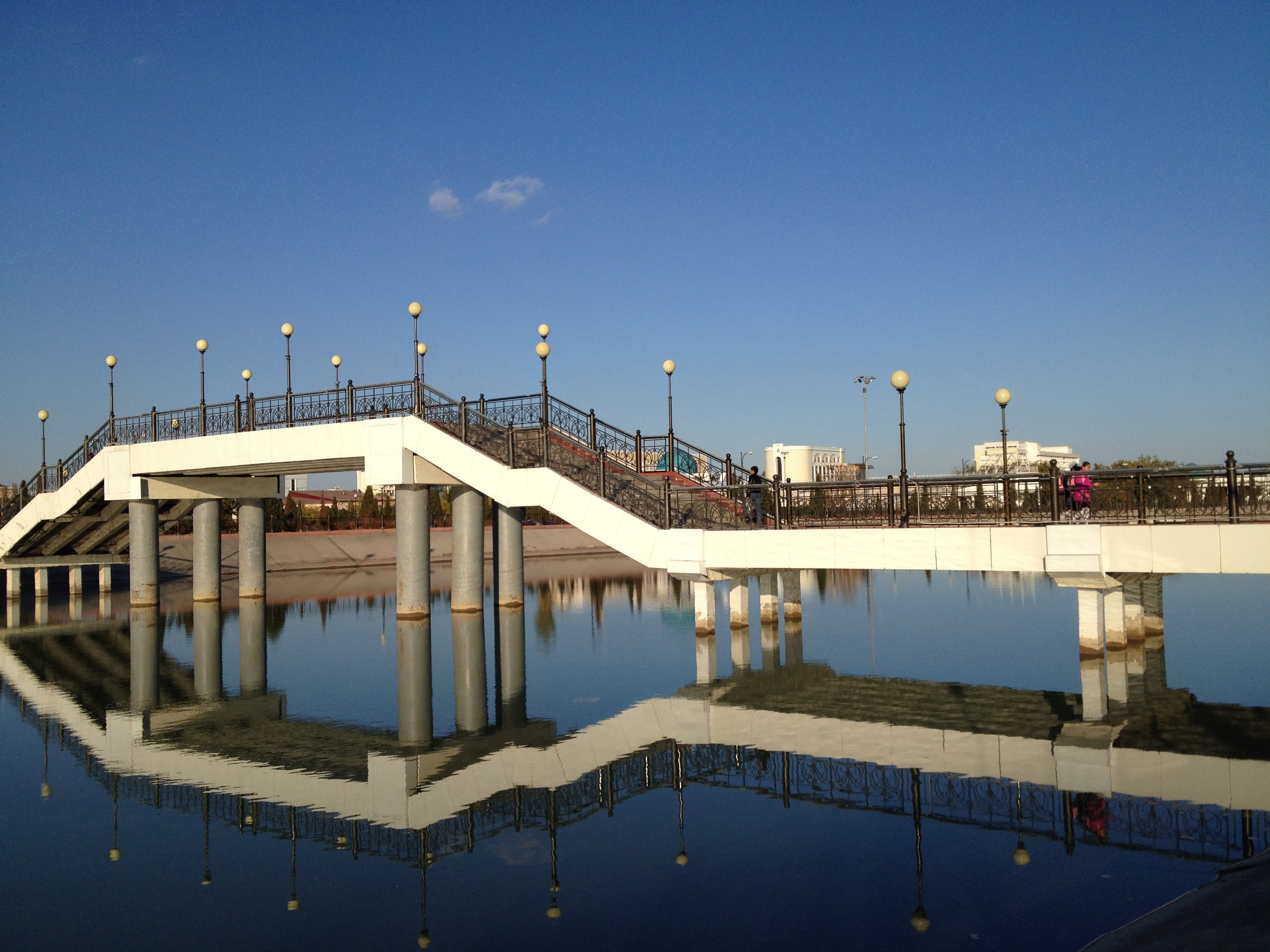
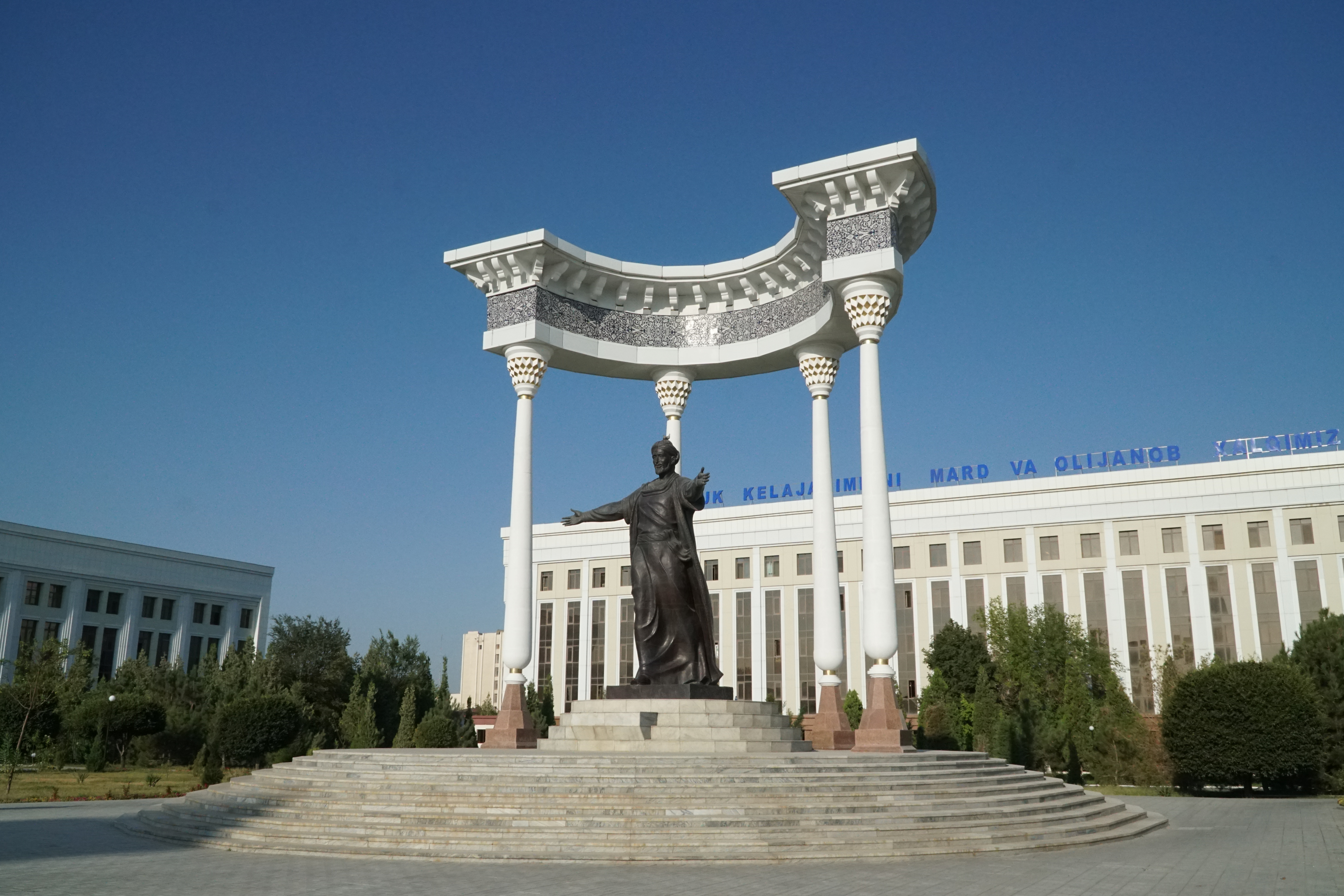
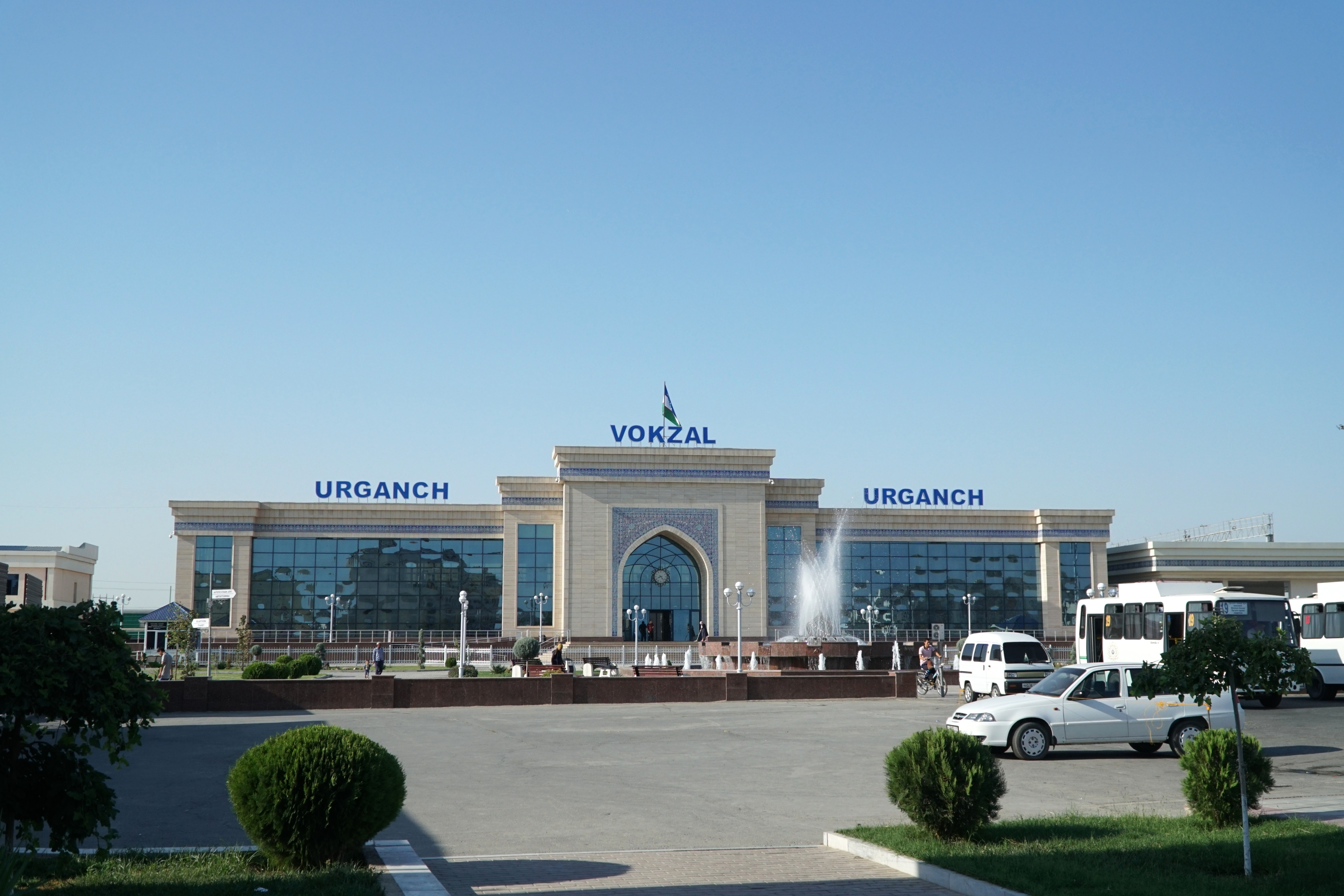
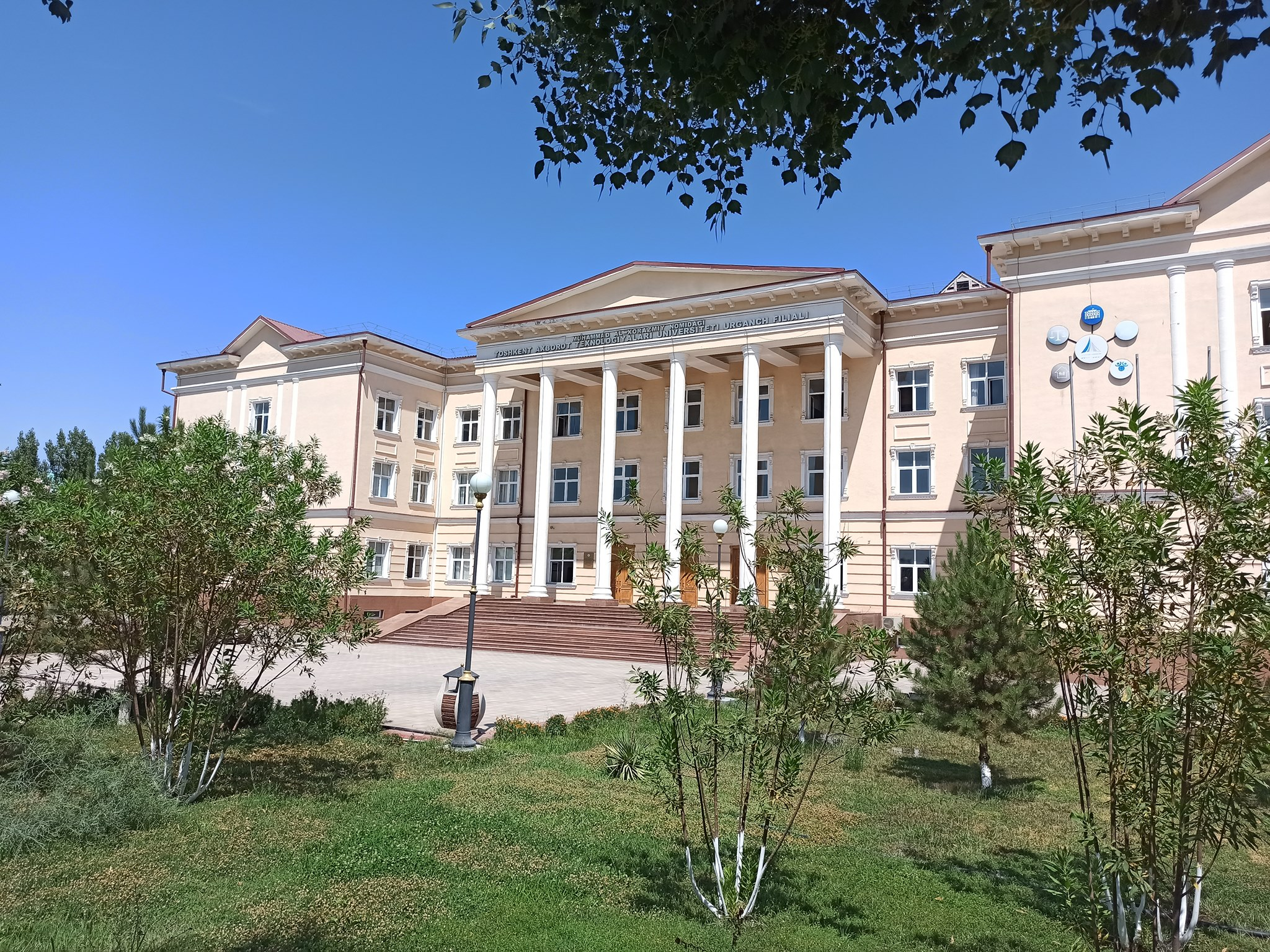
- From top, left to right: Waterfront of Shavat canal; Bridge through Shavat canal in "Avesto" park; Statue of al-Khwarizmi; Railway station; Urgench branch of the Tashkent University of Information Technologies

- Location in Uzbekistan
- Coordinates: 41°32′04″N 60°37′29″E
- Country: Uzbekistan
- Region: Khorazm Region
- Established: 1643

Area
  - Total: 30 km^{2} (12 sq mi)
- Elevation: 91 m (299 ft)

Population (2021)
  - Total: 145,000
  - Density: 4,800/km^{2} (13,000/sq mi)
- Time zone: UTC+05:00 (UZT)
- Postal code: 220100
- Area code: (+998) 62
- Website: www.urganchshahar.uz

Urgench (Uzbek: Urganch/Урганч/اورگنج, pronounced [urɡæntʃ]; Russian: Ургенч, romanized: Urgench; Persian: گرگانج, romanized: Gorgânj) is a district-level city in western Uzbekistan. It is the capital of Xorazm Region. The estimated population of Urgench in 2021 was 145,000, an increase from 139,100 in 1999. It lies on the Amu Darya River and the Shavat canal. The city is situated 450 km (280 mi) west of Bukhara across the Kyzylkum Desert.

== History ==
The history of the city goes back to the second half of the 19th century. The city should not be confused with the similarly named city of Konye-Urgench (also known as "Old Urgench" or "Gurgench") in Turkmenistan. The city of Old Urgench was left after the Amu Darya river changed its course in the 16th century, leaving the old town without water. New Urgench was founded by Russians in the second half of the 19th century at the site of a little trade station of the Khanate of Khiva.

Modern Urgench is a Soviet-style city with cotton motifs adorning many objects, from street lights to apartment houses. Of note is a monument to the twenty Komsomol members killed by Tekke basmachi on the banks of the Syr Darya in 1922, and a large statue to Muhammad al-Khwarizmi, the 9th century local mathematician who revolutionised algebra, outside the Hotel Urgench. Urgench is the main gateway for tourists to Khiva, 35 kilometres (22 mi) to the southwest, whose old city, known as Itchan Kala, is a UNESCO World Heritage Site.

== Geography ==
The city is located 968 kilometers west of Tashkent, 6 kilometers west of the Amu Darya River's bank (at the Chalysh port) along the Shavkat Canal.

=== Climate ===
Urgench has a cold desert climate (Köppen climate classification BWk).

Climate data for Urgench (1991–2020, extremes 1948–present)
Month	Jan	Feb	Mar	Apr	May	Jun	Jul	Aug	Sep	Oct	Nov	Dec	Year
Record high °C (°F)	22.0 (71.6)	31.0 (87.8)	32.8 (91.0)	38.8 (101.8)	43.1 (109.6)	43.5 (110.3)	47.0 (116.6)	46.4 (115.5)	41.0 (105.8)	35.3 (95.5)	28.0 (82.4)	21.3 (70.3)	47.0 (116.6)
Mean daily maximum °C (°F)	2.6 (36.7)	5.5 (41.9)	13.6 (56.5)	22.0 (71.6)	29.0 (84.2)	34.4 (93.9)	35.8 (96.4)	34.0 (93.2)	27.8 (82.0)	20.3 (68.5)	10.6 (51.1)	4.0 (39.2)	20.0 (67.9)
Daily mean °C (°F)	−2.0 (28.4)	0.1 (32.2)	7.4 (45.3)	15.4 (59.7)	22.1 (71.8)	27.2 (81.0)	28.5 (83.3)	26.0 (78.8)	19.5 (67.1)	12.2 (54.0)	4.6 (40.3)	−0.6 (30.9)	13.2 (55.8)
Mean daily minimum °C (°F)	−5.8 (21.6)	−4.4 (24.1)	2.0 (35.6)	8.9 (48.0)	14.6 (58.3)	19.1 (66.4)	20.6 (69.1)	18.0 (64.4)	11.7 (53.1)	5.3 (41.5)	−0.3 (31.5)	−4.3 (24.3)	7.1 (44.8)
Record low °C (°F)	−26.1 (−15.0)	−26.1 (−15.0)	−17.2 (1.0)	−6.1 (21.0)	1.1 (34.0)	6.1 (43.0)	10.0 (50.0)	5.0 (41.0)	−1.0 (30.2)	−10.8 (12.6)	−20.0 (−4.0)	−27.8 (−18.0)	−27.8 (−18.0)
Average precipitation mm (inches)	13.3 (0.52)	15.9 (0.63)	22.0 (0.87)	18.8 (0.74)	12.5 (0.49)	5.1 (0.20)	1.0 (0.04)	1.8 (0.07)	1.8 (0.07)	5.9 (0.23)	12.3 (0.48)	12.5 (0.49)	122.9 (4.83)
Average precipitation days (≥ 1.0 mm)	12	9	8	8	8	5	3	2	3	5	7	10	80
Average relative humidity (%)	80	74	68	51	41	39	41	46	51	56	65	77	57
Source 1: Pogoda.ru.net
Source 2: Deutscher Wetterdienst (Humidity 1961-1990), NOAA

== Infrastructure ==
In the city, there are factories for various purposes, including those producing forage harvesters, cotton cleaning machines, oil extraction, repair excavators, and tire repair. There are also silk and sewing factories and the production of construction materials has been established. Additionally, the Museum of Contemporary Art of Uzbekistan is in operation.

== Transport ==
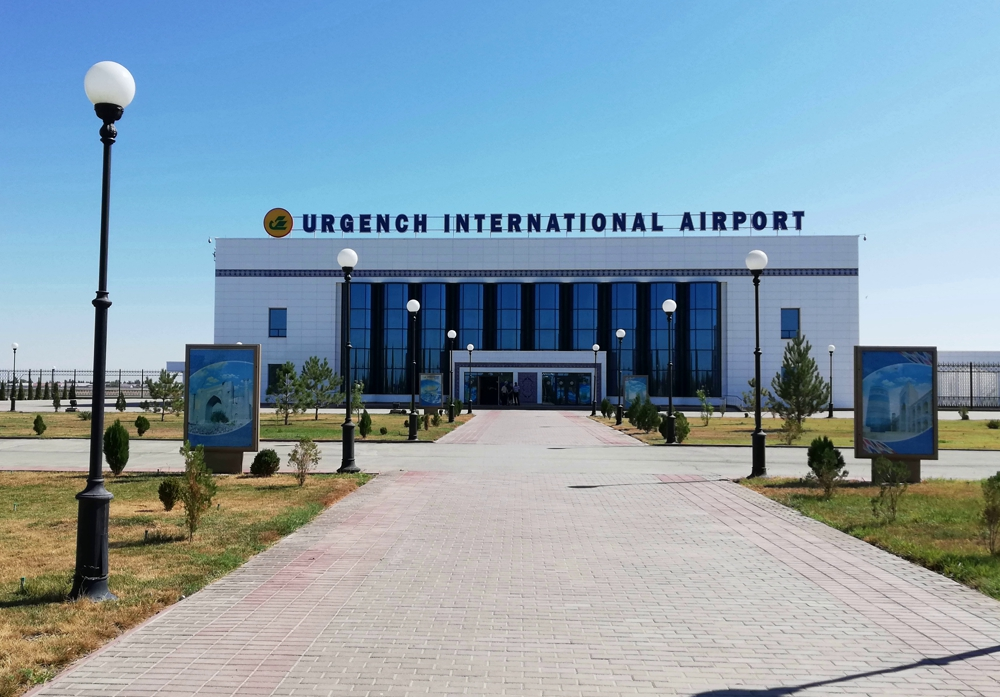
Urgench International Airport

The city has a railway station on the Türkmenabat-Beyneu railway line. Urban transportation in Urgench includes buses, trolleybuses, and minibus taxis. There is a unique trolleybus line between Urgench and Khiva, which is unusual for Central Asia. The Urgench Airport holds international status and is capable of accommodating all types of passenger aircraft. Regular flights operate to destinations including Tashkent, Moscow (Uzbekistan Airways, Siberia Airlines), Saint Petersburg, Paris, Rome, and Milan, as well as charter flights for tourists.

== Culture ==
In 1999, the 800th anniversary of Jalaluddin Manguberdi was celebrated in the city, and in 2001, the 2700th anniversary of the creation of the "Avesto" book was commemorated on an international scale. In 2003, a number of major sports facilities were built in the city for the Republic Sports Competitions "Umid Nihollari" held in Khorezm. Tourism has developed, especially in connection with ancient Khiva. The local and foreign visitors are served by the "O'zbekiston Turizm" company's branch, as well as the "Jaykhun," "Khorezm Palace," and "Avesto" hotels.

== Media ==
In the city, there are 27 newspapers and magazines published, including "Xorazm Haqiqati," "Urganch Oqshomi," "Yoshlar Ovozi," "Tujjor," and others.

== Notable people ==
- Anna German (1936–1982), Polish singer born in Urgench

== Gallery ==
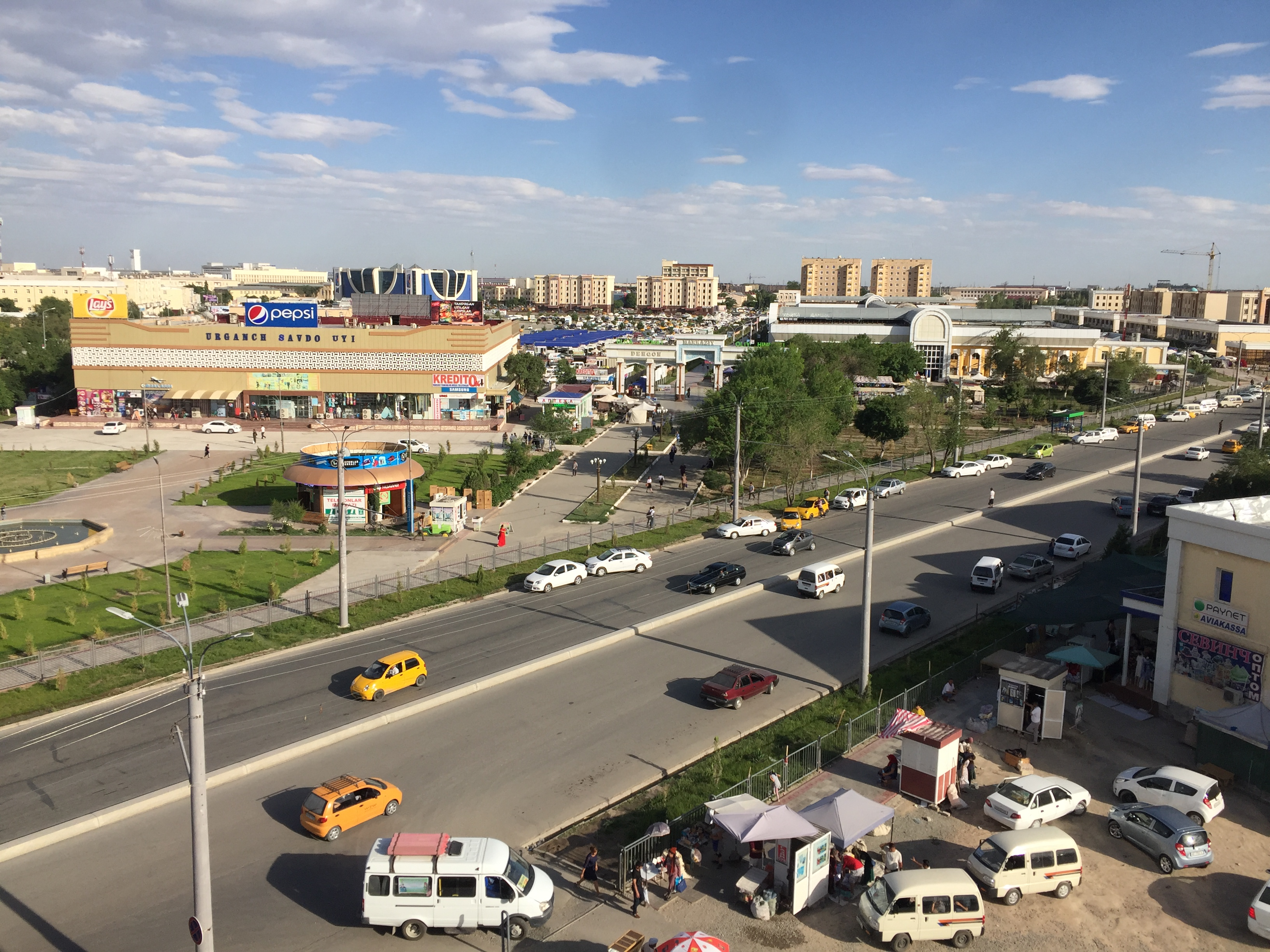
View of the central market area of Urgench from the fifth floor of the Hamkor Bank building. In the background, the blue and white building of the "Gipermarket", the largest shopping centre in Urgench.

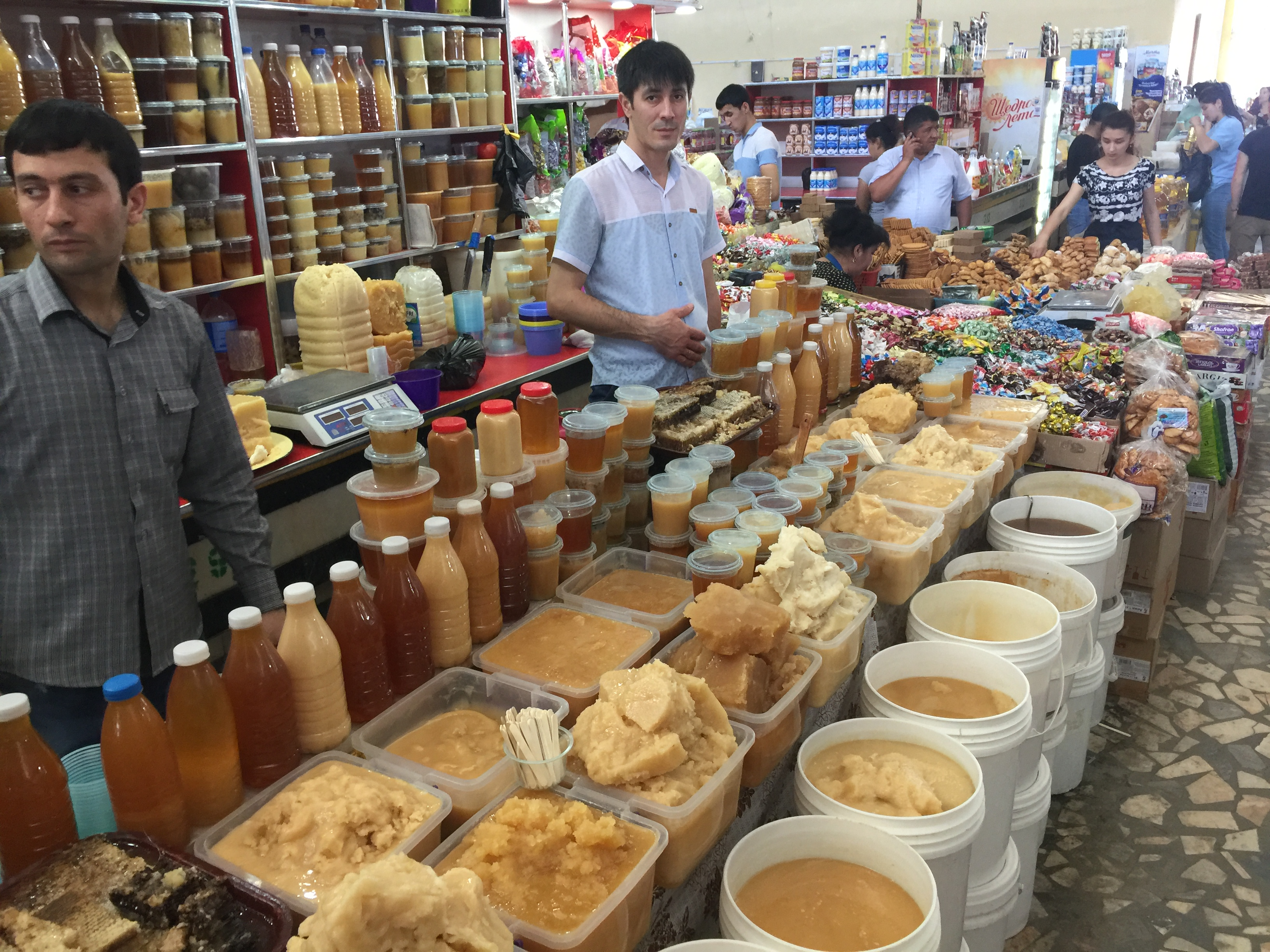
Honey merchant in the central market.

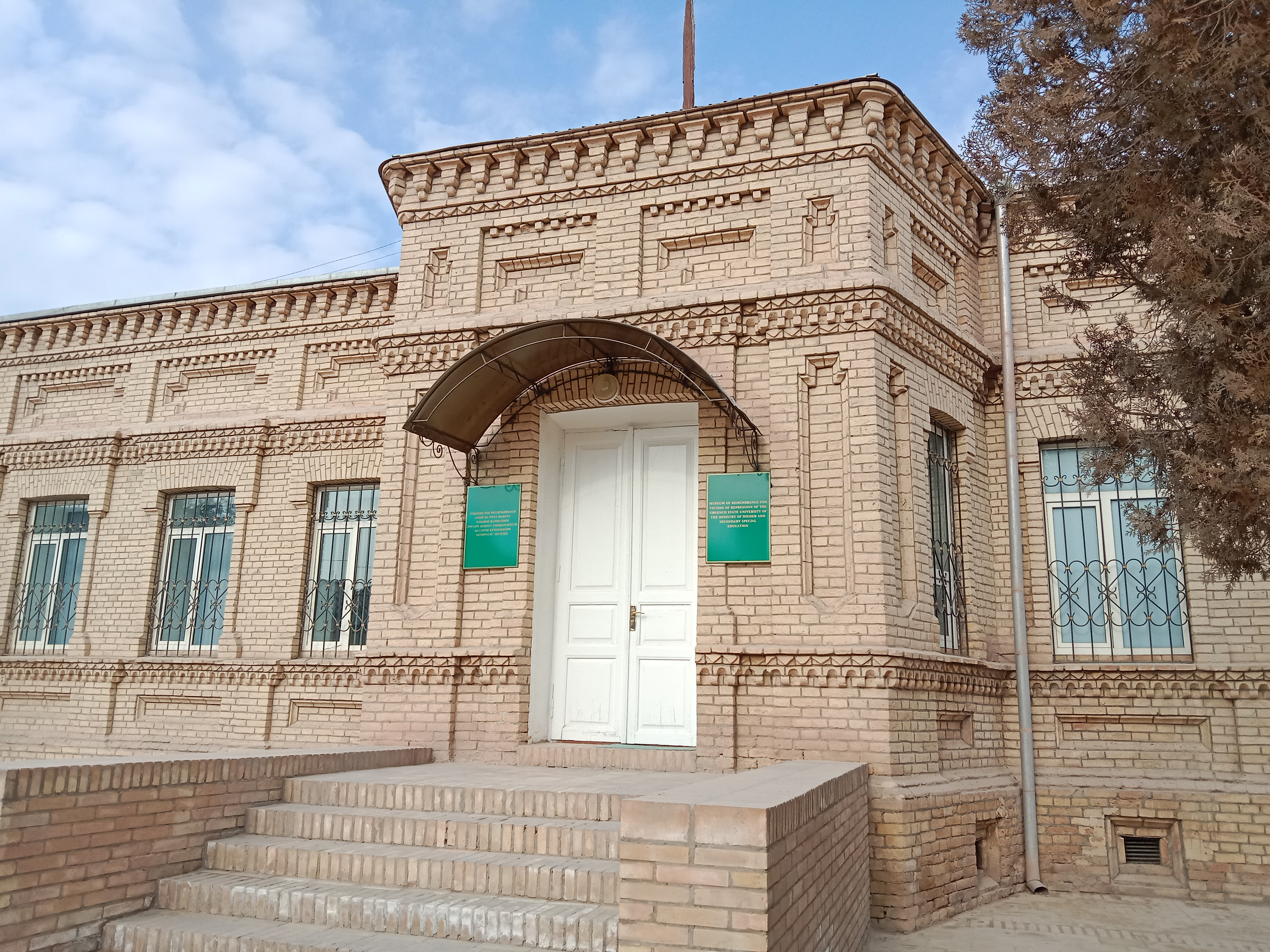
Local museum

== See also ==
- Old Urgench: Konye-Urgench in north Turkmenistan
- Trolleybuses in Urgench
- Urgench International Airport
