= Talib Makhsum Madrasah =

Madrasa in Khiva, Khorazm, Uzbekistan

General information
- Architectural style: Central Asian Architecture
- Location: 22 Islam Khoja Street, Itchan Kala, Khiva, Khorazm Region, Uzbekistan
- Year built: 1910
- Renovated: 1977
- Owner: State Property

Technical details
- Material: baked brick
- Floor count: 1
- Floor area: 18.8x16.55 m

Design and construction
- Architects: Khudoybergan Haji and Qalandar Kochim

Talib Makhsum Madrasah (or Talib Makhdum madrasa) is an architectural monument in Khiva, Khorazm Region, Republic of Uzbekistan. The madrasa was built in 1910 at the expense of Talib Makhsum (Makhdum), a member of khan family of Khiva Khanate. Today, the monument is located at 22 Islam Khoja Street, "Itchan Kala" neighborhood.

On October 4, 2019, by the decision of the Cabinet of Ministers of the Republic of Uzbekistan, the Talib Makhsum madrasa was included in the national list of real estate objects of tangible cultural heritage and received state protection. Currently, the "Itchan Kala" state museum-reserve is state property based on the right of operational management.

== History ==
Talib Makhsum (Makhdum) madrasa was completed in 1910 at the expense of Talib Makhsum Khoja. According to many historical sources, the idea of building the madrasa belongs to the court minister Islamkhoja Talib and the ruler of Khiva, Muhammad Rahim Khan II. The monument was built by Khudoybergan Haji and Qalandar Kochim, masters who participated in the construction of many madrasas from Khiva. The 8-room madrasa was built on the north side of the Islamkhoja Madrasah. The etymology of the word Makhsum (or Makhzum) means a person who is served, a noble person, a high-ranking intellectual. It is a title given to ulama, pir and teachers. According to another account, this word translates as "Knower of Persian/Arabic languages".

Talib Makhsum was a close friend of Muhammad Rahimkhan from his youth and he was the one who perfected playing the tanbur. His reputation was great for khan.

== Architecture ==
The madrasa was built in a rectangular layout and has a total area of 18.8x16.55 m, surrounded by 1-story rooms. Polished bricks in honor of gables are laid in 2 rows, decorated with green colored tiles. The entrance to the courtyard is through the mionsarai (gatehouse) with a dome in the style of a head. The classroom and the mosque are located next to the mosque. The area of the yard is 10.75x8.0 m, and the doors to the rooms in the corners are not opened. The roofs of the surrounding rooms are partly vaulted, and there are shallow arches in front of them. The rooms are entered through doors in the arches. According to scientists, the madrasa mainly trained copyists, calligraphers and experts in the field of world science. The madrasah was renovated on a large scale for the first time in 1977. Today, the Talib Makhsum madrasa operates a family kitchen-restaurant for tourists to rest and eat.a

== See also ==
- Matniyoz Devonbegi Madrasah
- Matrasulboy Mirzaboshi Madrasah
- Yusuf Yasovulboshi Madrasah
- Arab Muhammadkhan Madrasah
- Khojamberdibi Madrasah
