= Islam Khodja =

Grand Vizier of the Khiva Khanate

Seyid Islam Khodja Said Islomxoʻja / Said Islomkhўzha سید اسلامخاوجا سید اسلامخاوجا
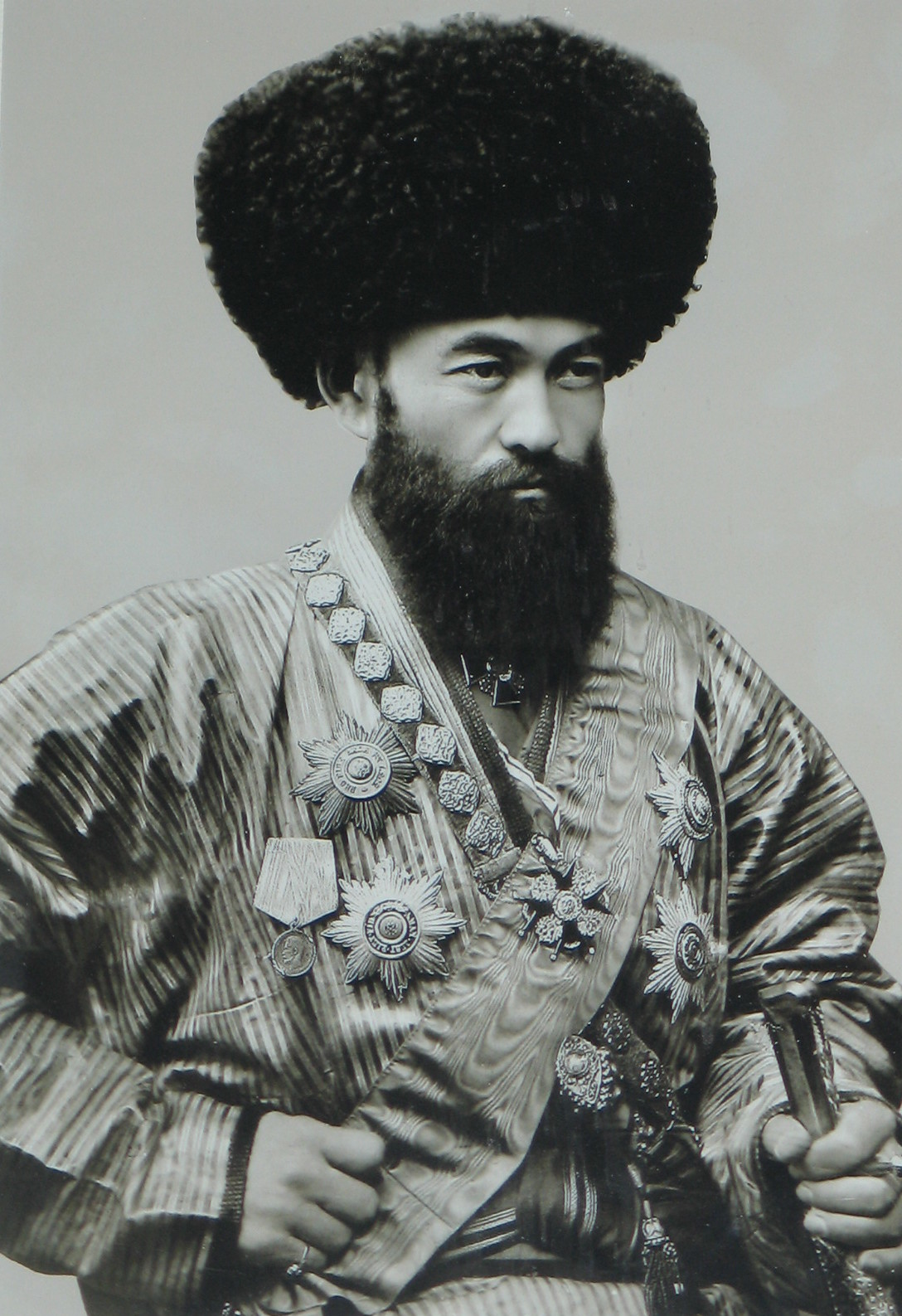
- A picture of Islam Khodja taken in 1910

Grand Vizier of the Khiva Khanate
- In office 1898–1913
- Monarchs: Muhammad Rahim Khan II; Isfandiyar Khan
- Succeeded by: Mad Wafa Baqqalov

Personal details
- Born: Seyid Islam-Khoja; 1872 Khiva
- Died: August 9, 1913 (aged 40–41)
- Parent: Seyid Ibrahim Hodja (father)
- Awards: Order of the White Eagle, Order of Saint Anna (1st and 2nd degree), Order of Saint Stanislaus (1st and 2nd degree), Medal "In Memory of the Coronation of Tsar Nicholas II

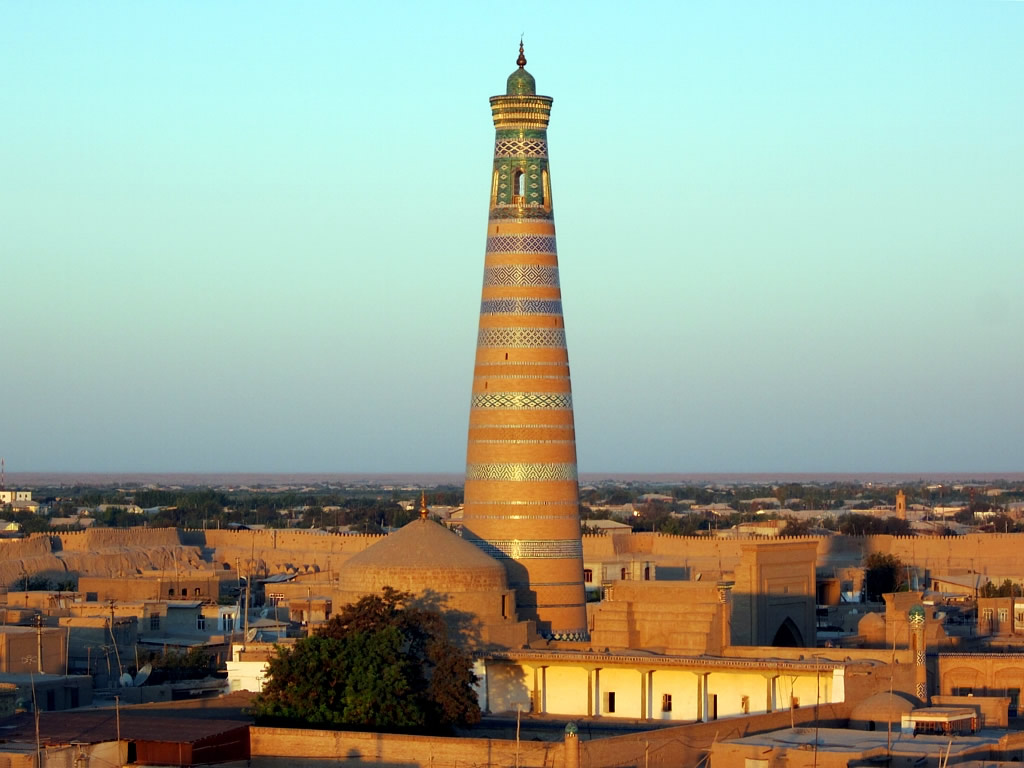
Islam-Khodja Minaret in Khiva

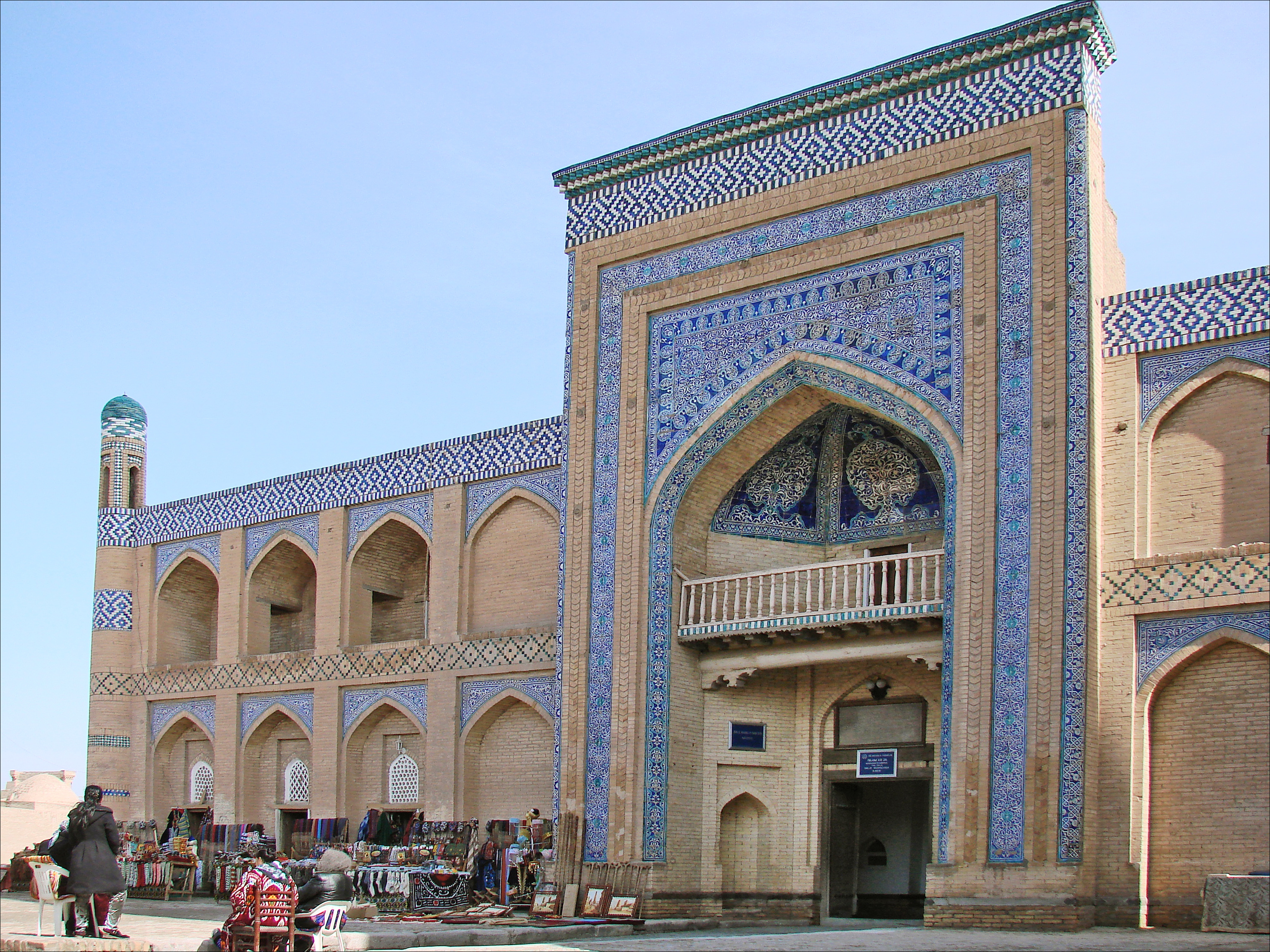
Islam-Khodja Madrasa in Khiva

Seyid Islam Khodja (1872 - 1913; Uzbek: Said Islomxoʻja / Саид Исломхўжа / سید اسلامخاوجا) was the Grand Vizier (Prime Minister) of the Khiva Khanate from 1898 until his death in 1913.

== Early life ==
Seyid Islam Khodja was born to Seyid Ibrahim Khoja in 1872 in Khiva. Growing up in the family of an Islamic clergy representative, Khodja studied at the Khiva madrasa. In addition to the native Khorezm dialect of the Uzbek language, he was fluent in Persian, as well as being proficient in Turkmen. He began his political career as governor of Hazorasp. In 1898, at the age of 26, he was appointed Grand Vizier of the Khiva Khanate, becoming the second statesman in the Khanate, and one of the youngest Grand Viziers in the history of the Khiva Khanate. At the time, the Khan was Muhammad Rahim Khan II. With his death in 1910, his son, Isfandiyar Khan, ascended the throne. With Isfandiyar Khan's enthronement, Islam Khodja began to play a much larger role in the Khanate. Isfandiyar Khan was only one year older than him, and, unlike his father, Isfandiyar did not have any special abilities in governing. Islam Khodja was popular amongst the Khivan population and part of the ruling elite. He was seen as an enlightened, wise, and fair vizier.

== Modernization Policies ==
During the reign of Isfandiyar Khan, Islam Khodja visited St. Petersburg and Moscow several times as part of a delegation from the Khiva Khanate. Islam Khodja admired European culture and tried to westernize the Khiva Khanate. With the permission of the khan, he received many foreign ambassadors and delegations from European countries. With his efforts and at his own expense, a ginnery, the first power station in the Khanate, a hospital, a pharmacy, a post office, a telegraph, Jadidist secular schools, as well as a Russian school were built.

Islam Khodja was the leader of the right wing of the Khorezm Jadidists, which united the Bais (the rich), industrialists and merchants. This was one of the rare cases in which one of the leaders in the state sided with the Jadidists. The right wing of the Jadidist movement, unlike the left wing, advocated for the preservation of the monarchy, but also for the implementation of liberal policies and large scale social, political, and economic changes in the Khanate. In neighboring states, there had already been significant political change - the Constitutional Revolution in Qajar Iran had brought much change and Russia had been subject to a revolution. Only the neighboring Emirate of Bukhara was still traditionalist and conservative. Bukharan leaders, under Mohammed Alim Khan, agreed with Isfandiyar Khan that they did not want radical transformations.

== Buildings ==
In 1910, with the efforts and funds of Islam Khodja, a large complex was constructed in the Southeast of Itchan Kala (the inner city of Khiva), comprising the Islam Khodja madrasah and the eponymous minaret, which were 44.6 meters high, becoming the highest minaret of Khiva and the entire Khiva Khanate. It was slightly shorter than the Kalyan minaret in Bukhara.

== Death ==
A number of public speeches made by Islam Khodja have been recorded, in which he spoke out against some customs and Sharia punishments for criminals and those who were disliked by people in power. He also demanded an end to arbitrary officials and the introduction of administrative reforms that would have prevented growing discontent from peasants. According to some reports, this was consistent with the opinion of the Governor-General of Turkestan, whose land bordered the Khiva Khanate to the North and Northeast. In 1910, the Khivan leadership was forced to publish a manifesto restricting the rights of landowners and the clergy under the guidance of the Young Khivans. This cause a wave of reactions from conservatives in the Khanate who allegedly managed to win Isfandiyar Khan to their side, convincing him that Islam Khodja was a threat to the Khan's power and the integrity of the state.

In 1913, Isfandiyar Khan invited Islam Khodja to his palace and released him at night after the Isha prayer. On the way to his suburban palace, located near the cemetery of Oglan Adiz-bobo, several people attacked Islam Khodja and inflicted several fatal knife wounds. After Islam Khodja's death, Isfandiyar Khan was found crying. The Khan ordered the executions of all of Islam Khodja's assassins, even though he knew about the murder, and, in the words of the former Young Khivan, Polvonniyoz hoji Yusupov, "the direct benefactor of the murder was Isfandiyar Khan himself." Having learned about the murder of the reformist Islam Khodja, a special commission was sent by the Russian Empire to investigate it. However, the commission was bribed by the frightened Khan's close associates and clergy, who were enemies of Islam Khodja, to not investigate. Soon after the assassination of Islam Khodja, his son, Abdusalam Khoja, was shot dead. His assistant and right-hand man, Raim Bergen, was found buried alive.

== Family ==
It is known that one of the wives of Isfandiyar Khan was Islam Khodja's daughter, and that Islam Khodja was the father-in-law of the Khan. Islam Khodja himself was also married. The name of his only son, Abdusalam Khoja, is known.

== Films ==
Unlike the policy of the conservative leadership of the neighboring Emirate of Bukhara, where art, photography and film were looked down upon, Islam Khodja contributed to the development and origin of photography and cinema in Khorezm. He invited Russian and European specialists to Khiva and supported the first Khorezm and Uzbek photographer and cameraman Khudaibergen Devanov.

In 2018, a historical drama movie about him premiered, titled "Islomxoʻja". It was written by Jurabek Ruzmetov and directed by Jahongir Akhmedov.

== Awards and honors ==
- Khanate of Khiva:
  - Winner of the Vaziri Akbar (Grand Vizier)
- Russian Empire:
  - Knight of the Order of the White Eagle
  - Cavalier of the Imperial Order of St. Anna, I and II degree
  - Cavalier of the Imperial and Tsarist Order of St. Stanislaus, I and II degree
  - Holder of the Medal “In memory of the coronation of Emperor Nicholas II”
