= Islamkhodja Madrasah =

Madrasa in Khiva, Khorazm, Uzbekistan

Islam Khodja Madrasah
- Islom Xo`ja Madrasasi
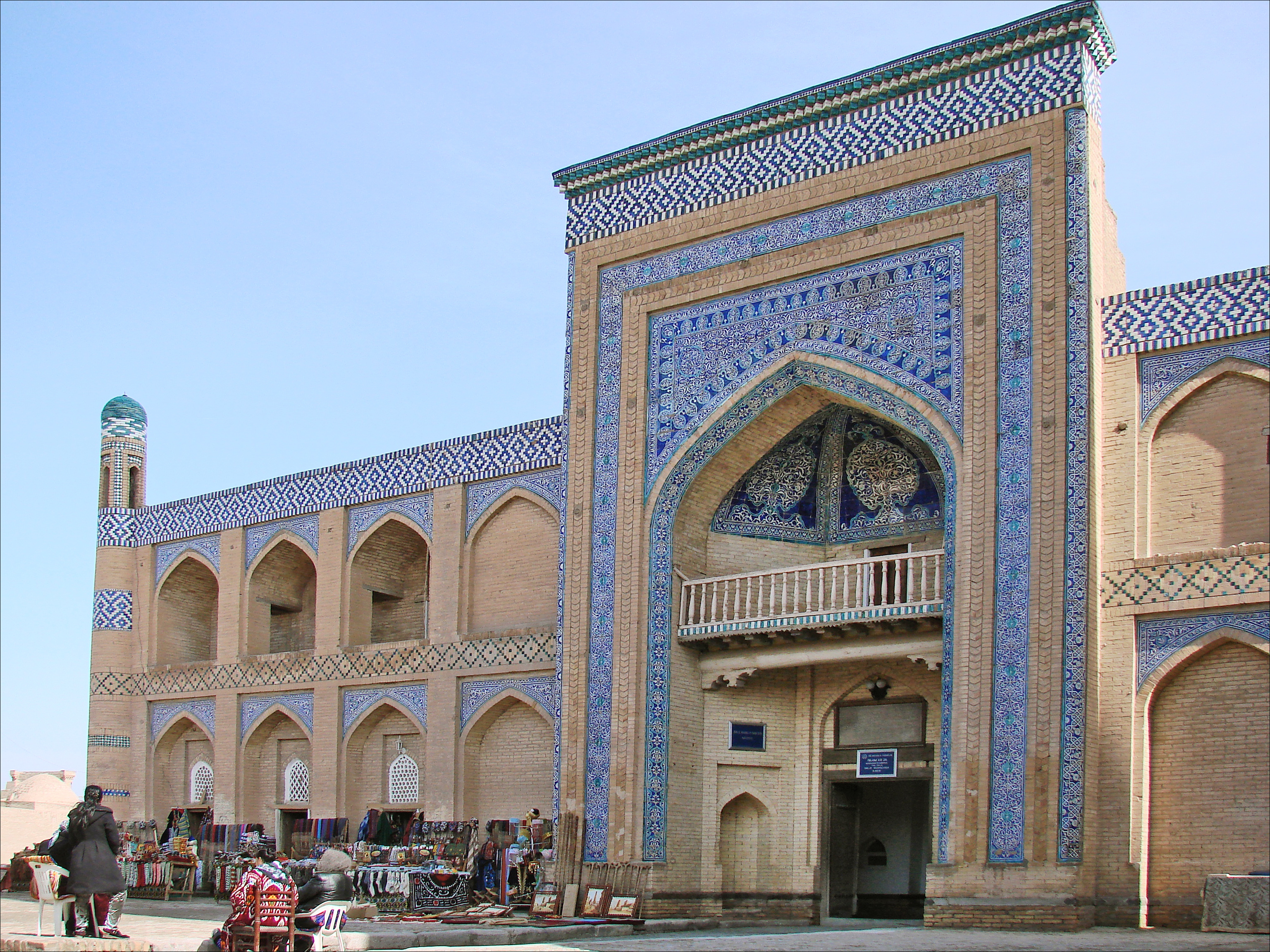
- Interactive map of the Islam Khodja Madrasah area

General information
- Status: National list of immovable property objects of material and cultural heritage of Uzbekistan, under state protection
- Type: Madrasah
- Architectural style: Central Asian Style
- Classification: Cultural heritage site
- Location: 45, Zargarlar Street, Itchan Kala, Khiva, Uzbekistan
- Coordinates: 41.3766°N 60.3605°E
- Year built: 1908-1910
- Owner: State property

Height
- Height: 56,6

Technical details
- Material: Baked bricks
- Size: 42 cells
- Floor count: 2 floors
- Grounds: 23*20

Design and construction
- Architects: Xudoybergan xoji, Bolta Voisov va Eshmuhammad Xudoyberdiyev

Islamkhodja Madrasah is an architectural monument in Khiva, Uzbekistan. It is located in the center of the Itchan Kala. It was built by Islam Khodja, the prime minister and father-in-law of Khiva-Isfandiyar Khan (1908–1910).

== History ==
The construction of the madrasah began in 1908. Construction work was completed by 1910. Islamkhodja madrasah consisted of 42 rooms. 50 students studied at the Institute of Science. He was one of the famous people of the Islamic Khoja era, who sacrificed his life for the improvement of the city of Khiva. Thanks to his efforts, a hospital, a post office, a telegraph, a double gate, a reception hall of Asfandiyar Khan in the Nurullabai palace, and new iron bridges were built in some areas of Khorezm in Khiva.

== Architecture ==
The main style of the madrasah (42.8*32.5) is two-story. A special mosque was also built on the right side of the entrance. The appearance and decoration of the madrasah, which is connected to the minaret with the main facade, does not differ much from other madrasas in Khiva. The side wings of the roof are decorated in the form of two-story arches. The corners are decorated with bouquets. The top of the porches is decorated with borders and glazed tiles. There are no decorations on the walls of the yard. The courtyard (23x20) is surrounded by small one-story rooms (42 in total). There is a veranda on the second floor of the main house facing the courtyard. The mosque to the southeast of the madrasah has a dome, and its mihrab is decorated with tiles and ganchkori patterns. The tallest tower in Khiva (56.6 m) rises in front of it. The diameter of the base is 9.5 m. It becomes thinner towards the top. Belts are made with blue and green patterns. Fences were installed in the cage, and the top was finished with a dome and a dome. The tower is visible from almost all parts of the city. Architect Khudoibergan Haji, painters Eshmuhammad Khudoiberdiyev, Bolta Voisov and others took part in the construction of Islamkhodja madrasah and minaret. On the back side of the peshtok, above the rooms, a porch with a simple wooden column was built. The largest room of the madrasah is a large domed mosque. The mosque occupies the entire southwestern side of the Islamkhodja madrasah. The interior of the mosque is closed in the type of room with a large dome, typical of the creative school of the masters of Khiva. Under the dome in the corner located on the southern side of the mosque and in the mihrab, a beautiful scene was created using silk and hanchkori ornaments. Islam Khodja allocated 14,451 acres of land from his property as a foundation for the establishment of the madrasah. Currently, the "Khorazm Applied Art" museum is operating in the madrasah. It exhibits wooden sculptures, metal objects, carpets, stones with ancient Arabic inscriptions, khums, as well as everyday objects and coins.
