= Sayid Abdullah =

Last Khan of Khiva (r. 1918–20)

Sayyid Abdullah Khan
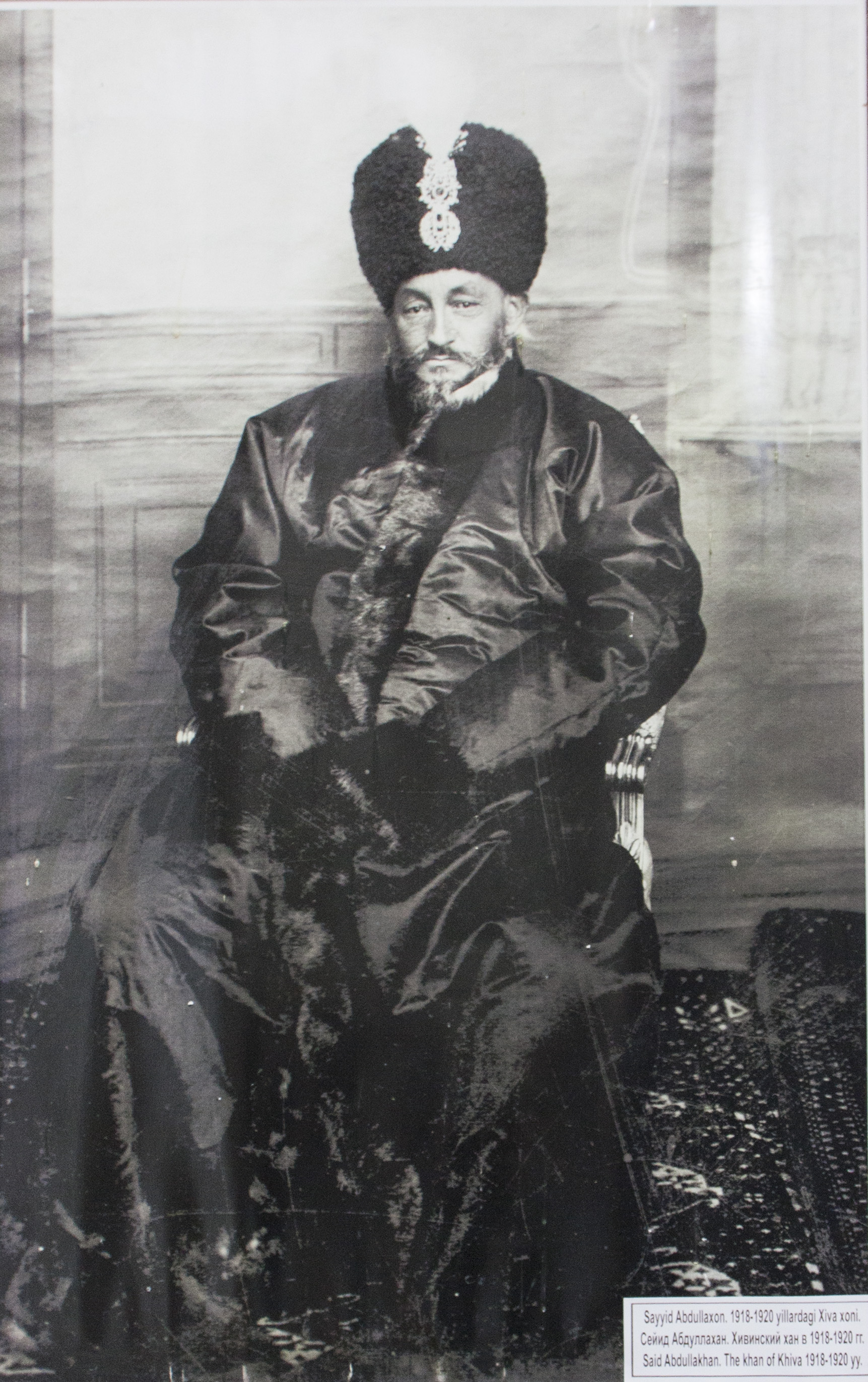
- Sayid Abdullah, presumably during his reign

Khan of Khiva
- Reign: 1918–1920
- Predecessor: Isfandiyar Khan
- Successor: Monarchy abolished by Red Army invasion. Territory taken over by the Soviet Union.
- De facto leader: Junaid Khan
- Born: 1873; Khiva, Khiva Khanate (present-day Uzbekistan)
- Died: 1933 (aged 59–60); Kryvyi Rih, Ukrainian SSR, Soviet Union (present-day Ukraine)
- Burial: Kryvyi Rih's Rudnichnoye Cemetery
- House: Khongirad
- Father: Muhammad Rahim Khan II
- Religion: Sunni Islam

Sayid Abdullah Khan (Turki and Persian: سید عبدالله خان; 1873–1933) was the last Khan of Khiva of the Khongirad (Qungrat) dynasty, from 1 October 1918 until 1 February 1920. His father was Muhammad Rahim Khan II.

== Biography ==
Although a titular ruler, Sayid Abdullah had no real power because the Khanate was effectively controlled by the Basmachi leader Junaid Khan, a Turkmen general, following a coup in 1918. By 1920, the Bolsheviks had defeated Junaid Khan, overthrown the Khanate of Khiva and deposed Sayid Abdullah. He was sent to Ukraine, where he died 13 years later at a hospital.

Ukrainian writer Grigory Jamalovich Huseynov in the early 1980s met with the descendants of Said Abdullah Khan, and conducted a study about the descendants of the Khan in Ukraine. In particular, he interviewed the nephew of Said Abdullah Khan, Abdurasul Mukhammedyarovych Madiyarov, who lived in Kryvyi Rih, who told in detail the history and life of the Khan's descendants in Ukraine. Grigory Huseynov outlined the results of his research in the essay “How the Khan Worked at the Mine”.

After abdicating the throne on February 2, 1920, Said Abdullah Khan and his family were arrested by the Bolsheviks. The trial of the Khan and his family began on June 12, 1920. Said Abdulla Khan and nine (according to other sources seven) of his closest male relatives were deported and exiled from the Khorezm People's Soviet Republic for a period of 3 to 5 years. The remaining members of the Khan's large family, the less influential men, the women, old people and children, were separated from them and left in the republic itself. In addition, all property, money, jewelry, houses, lands and estates of the royal family were confiscated.

The nine people sentenced to exile were; Said Abdulla Khan himself, his three sons Said Abdulla, Rahmatulla and Yakub Yusuf, his brother Muhammadyar, as well as his nephews Abdurasul, Madyar, Nasyr and Ibadulla. They were first taken from Khiva to Tashkent, where they were held for two days, and from there, under guard, they were taken by train to Samara, where they stayed for three weeks. From Samara they were all taken by train to Moscow. For two further weeks they were kept in the Horde camp, then in the Andraikovsky camp for ten months, followed by another two months in the Ivanovo camp. On February 12, 1922, all of them, including Said Abdullah Khan himself, were unexpectedly released and instructed to find work for themselves. They were first sent to Yekaterinoslav (now Dnipro), but could find no work there and moved to nearby Verkhovtsevo, where they began working at a local state farm. In July 1924, everyone - with the exception of Abdurasul Mukhamadyarovich who entered the local police school - arrived in Krivoy Rog at the Oak Balka mine (later renamed the Bolshevik mine). Three of them began working at the mine as watchmen and grooms. At the time, there was high unemployment in central Ukraine and the rest were unable to find work. They did not speak Russian or Ukrainian, nor did they have any useful skills characteristic of the inhabitants of this region. Bad news reached them from Khorezm that the former Khan's family, forcibly divided and left in Khiva, now lived below the poverty line, starved, and lived literally on alms and the help of neighbors, even the small children forced to begin begging.

Upon learning of this, in July 1925 they applied to the Krivoy Rog department of the GPU, the Council of People's Commissars of the Ukrainian SSR and the All-Ukrainian Central Executive Committee for permission to return home to Khorezm. In early August, the Secretariat addressed the People's Commissariat with a proposal to familiarize themselves with a copy of the request of the exiles and send their proposals. In a cover letter, the head of the administrative department of the NKVD wrote that "if there are no obstacles, then take all measures to satisfy their request." However, the Ukrainian GPU decided to play it safe and forwarded all materials to the OGPU under the Council of People's Commissars of the USSR. Their response stated that any return to their homeland was undesirable because of "the possibility of any influence on the masses".

In 1926, Abdurasul joined the exiles when he retired from the police. He came to Krivoy Rog with his wife named Olimpiada, and his large family lived in one of the mine barracks. Later he married a local resident named Vlada Zhitkovskaya.

== Death ==
Said Abdulla Khan himself did not start a family in Krivoy Rog, and continued to work as a watchman at the Bolshevik mine. At the place of work, he had the nickname “Khan”, and most did not guess or believe that “Khan” was the last Khan of the State of Khorezm from the Qungrat dynasty. In 1932, a massive famine (known as the Holodomor) began in the Ukrainian SSR and in 1933, Said Abdullah Khan fell ill and was admitted to the mine hospital, where he was diagnosed with dysentery, and died a month later from a prolonged illness and malnutrition. He was buried in the mine cemetery.

The elder brother of Said Abdullah Khan, Muhammadyar, was elderly at the time of his arrival during the exile, approximately 70 years old. He could not work and after the onset of the severe famine, he was forced to beg. The younger brother of Said Abdullah Khan - Ibadulla, who was also expelled from Khorezm, was deaf from childhood and, unable work throughout his life, also took to begging at the local market next to the mine shop. By the summer of 1934, Ibadullah was also severely malnourished, and died after being accidentally run over by a truck.

== Descendants ==
In 1933, the exiles were allowed to return to Central Asia or settle in other parts of the USSR without restrictions, and the sons of Said Abdulla Khan - Rahmatullah and Yusuf Yakub moved to Tashkent, where some of their relatives lived. After arriving in Tashkent, they sent a letter to Krivoy Rog and reported their whereabouts. Muhammadyar, the elder brother of Said Abdullah Khan, decided to return to Khiva, but reaching Tashkent, he was again forced to resort to begging, and died there in 1936, never reaching his native Khiva.

The Khan's son, Said Abdulla, moved with his wife to Tashkent, where he worked as a translator. Later he moved to the city of Osh and worked in exploration. In later years, he began to drink, and in 1941 he knocked down a man and was sentenced to five years in the labor camps. His wife returned to Krivoy Rog in 1944. Said Abdullah died in the early 1960s. Throughout the Soviet era, all exiles continued to be prohibited from re-entering Khiva, while there were no restrictions on entry to the rest of the USSR.

After 1934, only the brothers Nasyr and Abdurasul remained in Krivoy Rog. Nasyr worked as a watchman, although he was the most educated among the expelled. He wrote poetry and painted. He was married several times, but each of his wives parted with him apparently because of his poverty. He spent the last years of his life alone, dying in 1944. Abdurasul was able to build himself a small house, marry, and live the rest of his life in a mining village. During the occupation of Ukraine by the Third Reich, he was deported to Germany as forced labor. Upon his release, he returned to his job as a groom. He had three daughters, grandchildren and great-grandchildren. He died in the 1990s, still living in Ukraine, having shortly before his death visited the grave of his grandfather Muhammad Rahim Khan II in Khiva in 1990.

In February 2019, Wind from the East (Ukrainian: Вітер зі Сходу, romanized: Viter zi Skhodu) authored by Hryhorii Dzhamalovych Huseinov was prepared for publication, which is completely dedicated to the life history of these exiles. The book was written on the basis of Abdurasul's many hours of stories to Grigory Huseynov, as well as on the basis of various archival data and documents and Abdurasul's impressions after returning from Khiva in 1990. The book also contains numerous photographs, documents and manuscripts provided to Grigory Huseynov by the descendants of Abdurasul.

Preceded by Isfandiyar Khan	Khan of Khiva; 1918–1920	Monarchy overthrown and abolished by the Bolsheviks.
