= Nurullabai Palace =

Nurullabai palace
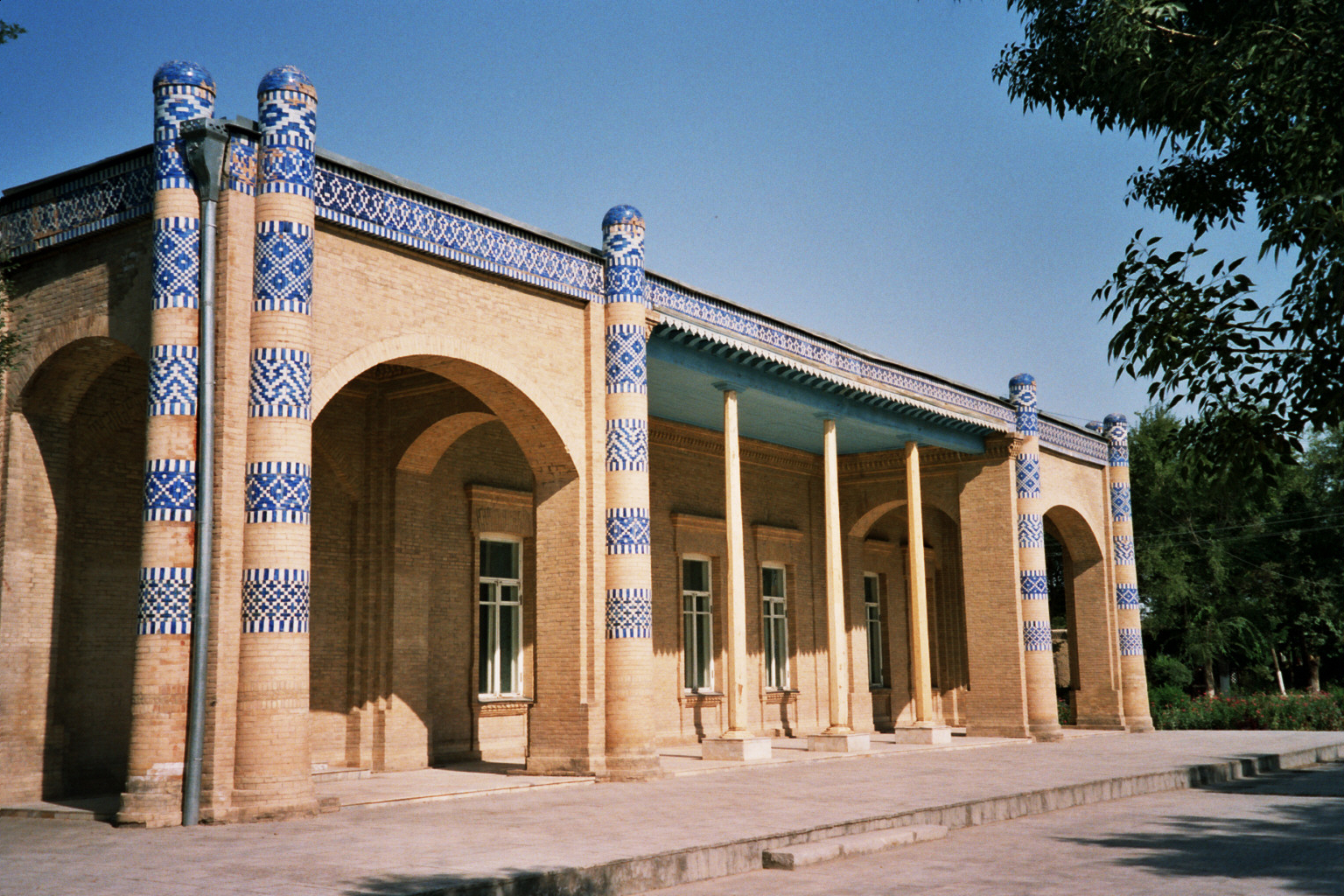
- General view of the palace
- Interactive map of the Nurullabai palace area

General information
- Architectural style: European style
- Location: Khiva
- Coordinates: 41.3825°N 60.3564°E
- Construction started: 1864
- Completed: 1912
- Renovated: 2017

Height
- Height: 7.5 m

Technical details
- Material: baked brick
- Floor count: 1
- Floor area: 185.6x143.0 m

Nurullabai Palace is an architectural monument in Khiva, Uzbekistan. It was formerly the official reception hall of Asfandiyar Khan (20th century). This palace-garden was built by Khan of Khiva Muhammad Rahim Khan II for his son Asfandiyar Khan (it is called Nurullabai Palace, because it was built instead of the garden of a person named Nurullabai).

== History ==
Plans for the palace were created in the 1890s. Due to the lack of space in the Itchan Kala, the palace was built on the site of a former garden outside the city center in the northwest of Khiva. Before the start of construction, the garden belonged to a wealthy merchant, Nurullabai, who agreed to sell his property only on the condition that the palace to be built would be named after him in the future. Due to this event, the palace is still named after the merchant.

The construction of Nurullabai Palace began in 1904 and continued during the reign of Asfandiyar Khan after the death of Muhammad Rahim Khan II in 1910. Apart from craftsmen and artists of Khiva, specialists from Russia and Germany were also involved in the construction, and they had their influence on the design of the object. Some of the building materials including tiles and ceramics produced in Sankt-Peterburg were imported. After the death of his father, in 1912, Asfandiyar Khan built a separate building in the complex to receive foreign guests.

The palace was completed in 1912, two years after the death of Muhammad Rahim Khan. Later, this building was used by the khan and his family as a residence until the establishment of the Khorezm People's Soviet Republic in 1920.

In the recent past, the main attention was paid to the preservation of the object, the reconstruction work was completed in 2017.

== Architecture ==
The Nurullabai palace consists of 9 large and small rooms, a gatehouse, a palace, a reception hall, a madrasah, a residence for servants, a garden, courtyards with flower gardens. The complex (185.6x143.0 m) is entered from the gate through a bridge built over a ditch in the south side of palace. There are several rooms in the corridor of the gatehouse. The palace is rectangular in shape (87.1x65.0 m), has 4 courtyards, and is surrounded by a fortified wall (height – 7.5 m) with turrets. There are two-story rooms in the 3rd courtyard, and one-story rooms in the south-western courtyard. The main gatehouse is interconnected with the madrasah and residence. The large yard occupies the northwestern part of the palace. There is a well in the yard.

The reception hall (27.5x32.1 m) was built in the north-east of the palace in a unique European style. The front faces south. It has 1 floor and 7 rooms. There are also porches in the front and back side of reception hall.

The front of the madrasah faces east. There is a 2-story mosque with 4 columns in the south-eastern corner, a porch in the north-west, classrooms and rooms around the courtyard. Patterns on the outer walls and 4 corners are decorated with baked bricks and tiles.

The garden is adjacent to the palace and is surrounded by a high fortified wall with turrets. There are doors on 3 sides of the garden, 2 doors are connected to the palace, and the one in the east is connected to the reception hall. There is an 8-sided pool in the middle of the garden.

== Gallery ==
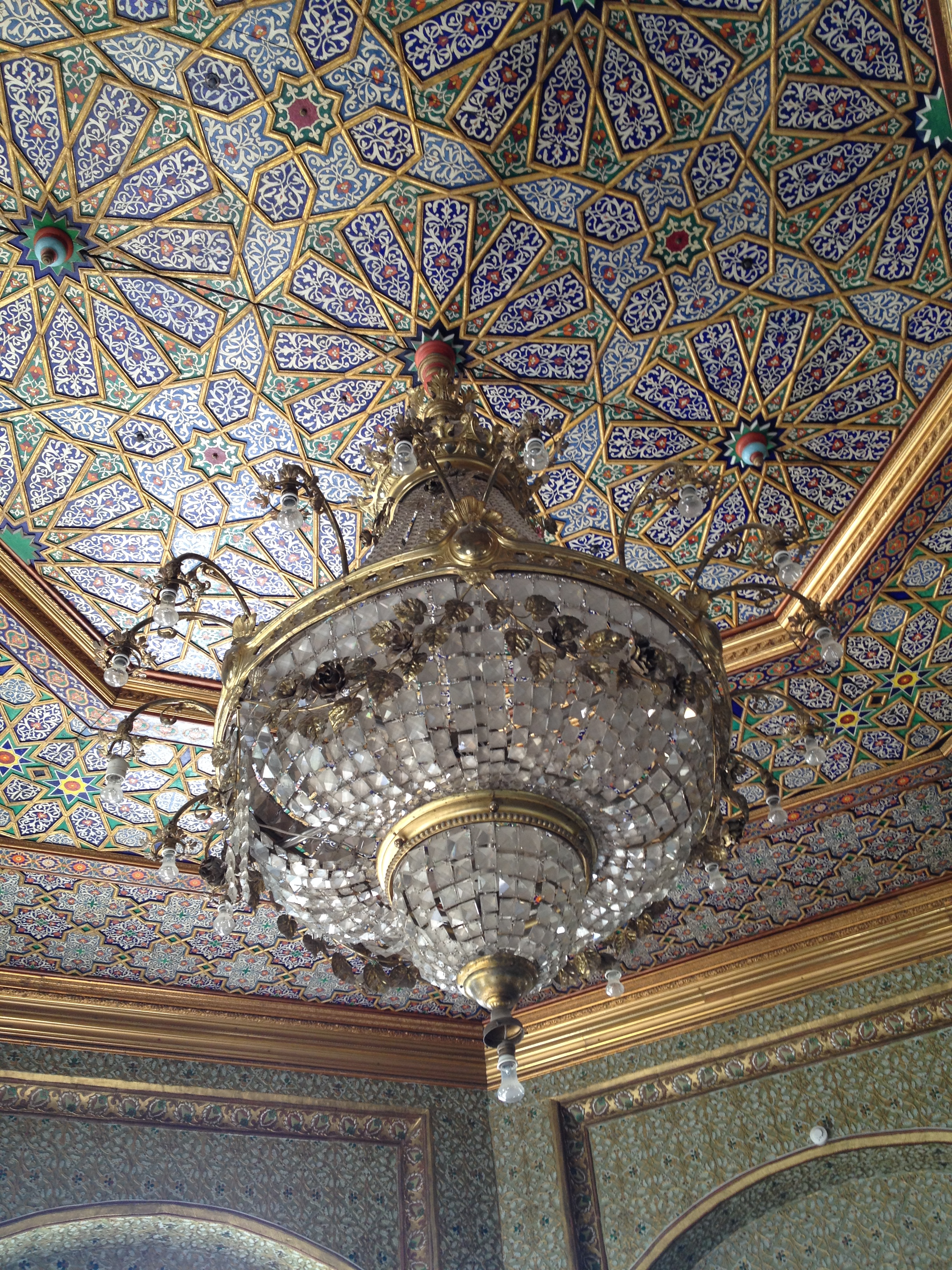

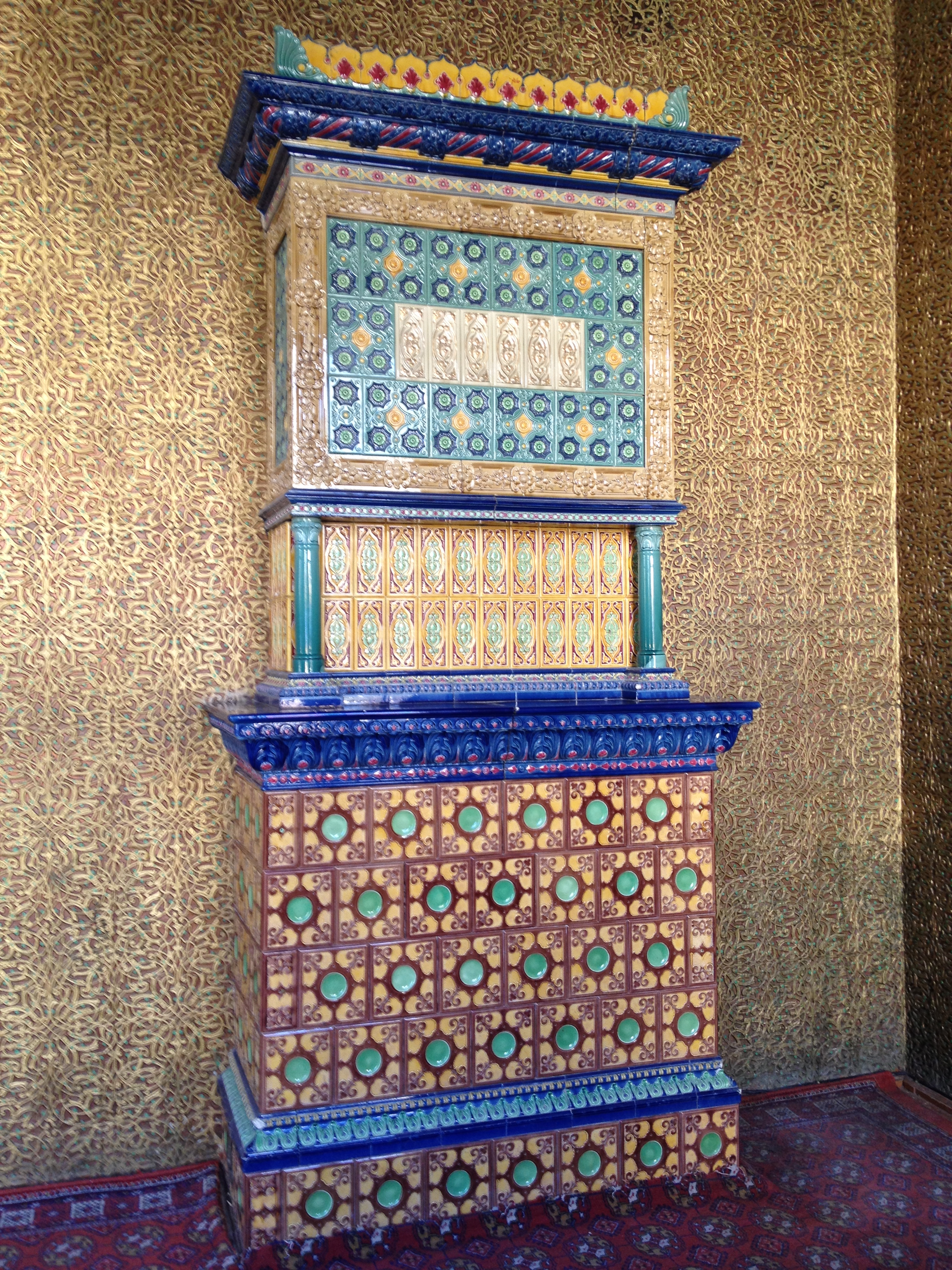

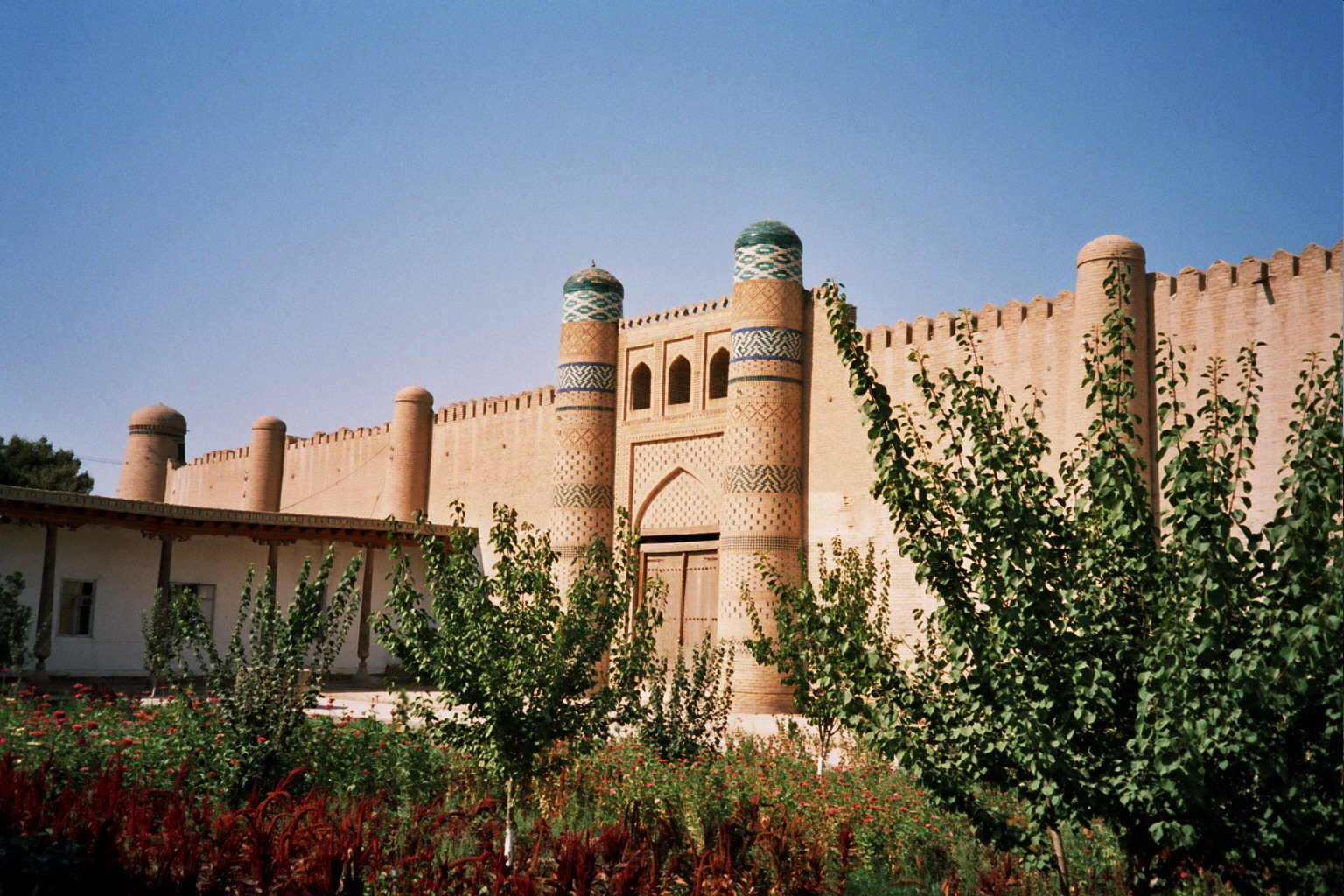

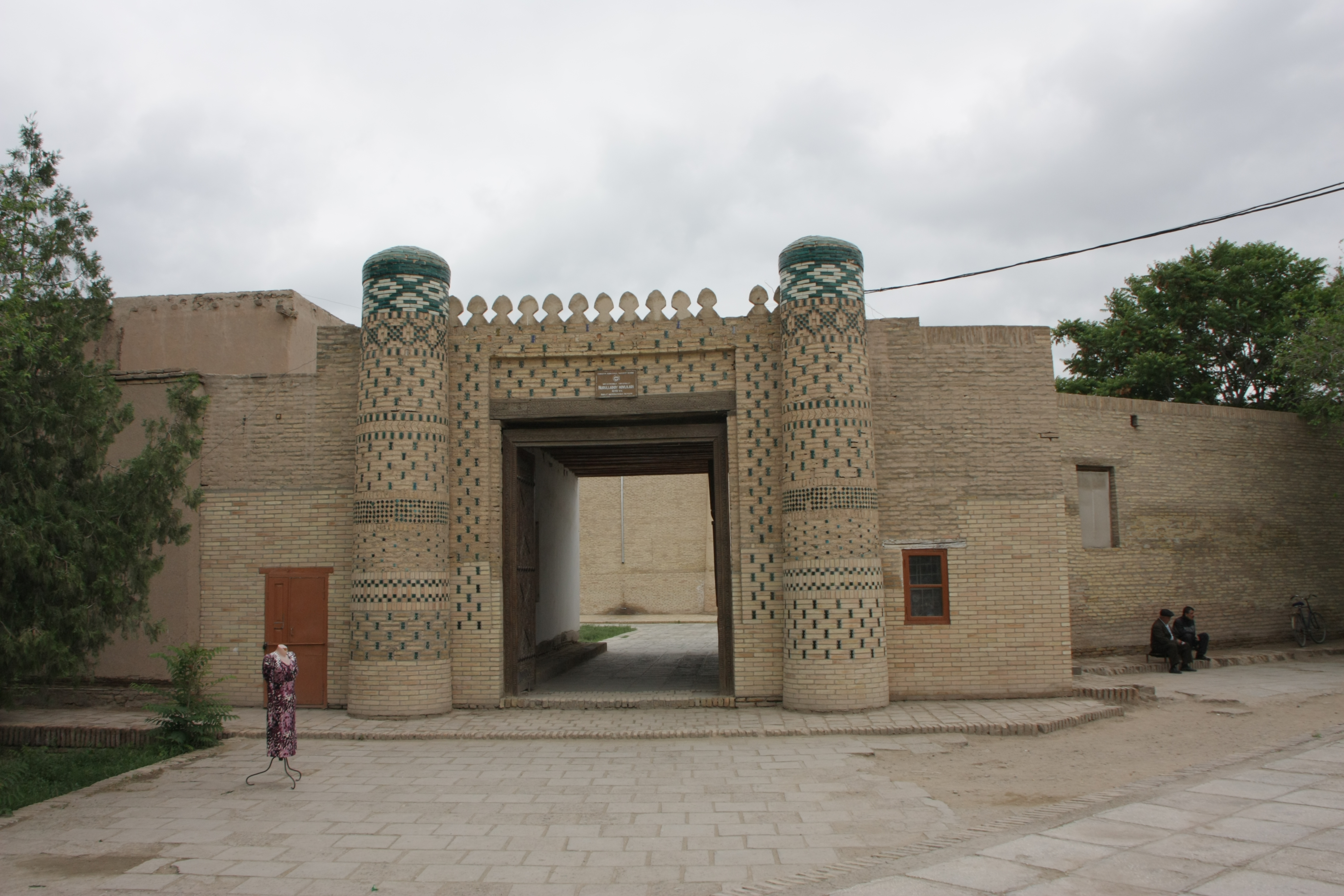

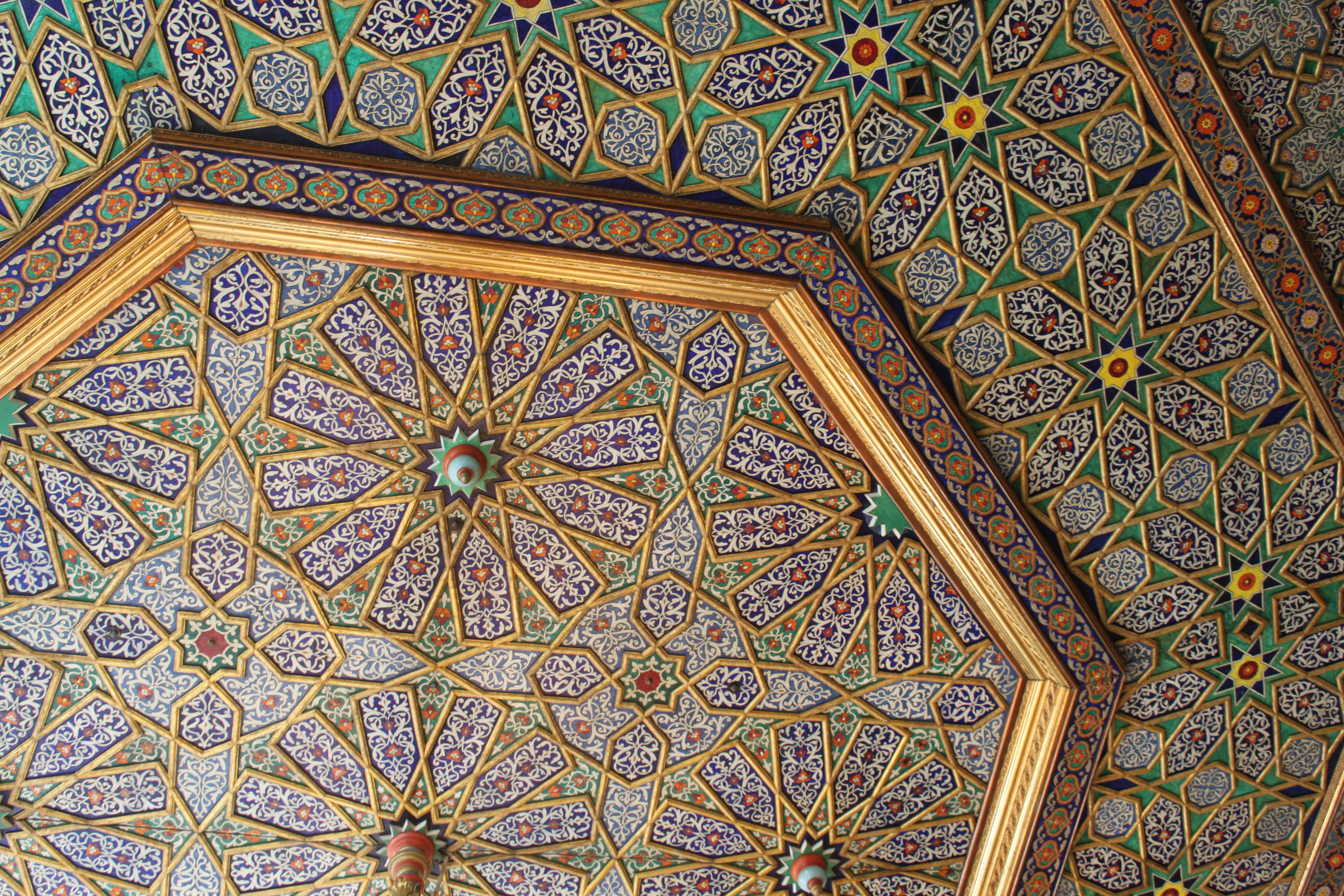
