= Polvonniyoz Yusupov =

Polvonniyoz Yusupov (Note: Uzbek Cyrillic: Полвонниёз Юсупов; Russian: Палван-Нияз Юсупов, romanized Palvanniyaz Yusupov.) (Khiva, 1861– Khiva, 14 May 1936) was a statesman and representative of the Young Khivan movement, a branch of Jadidism in the Khiva Khanate.

== Biography ==
Polvonniyoz Yusupov was born in Khiva in 1861. He graduated from school and studied in a madrasa. He was engaged in trade and was fluent in Arabic and Russian.

In 1914, he headed the left wing of the Jadids, who stood in opposition to the Khiva khan Asfandiyar Khan. In April 1917, the Jadids presented to Asfandiyar Khan a project of reforms, one of the authors of which was Polvonniyoz Yusupov. Since 1917, he was forced to leave Khorezm and lived in exile in Tashkent.
After the fall of the power of the Uzbek dynasty of Kungrats in the Khiva Khanate in February 1920, the Khorezm People's Soviet Republic was created, the Chairman of the Council of which was Polvonniyoz Yusupov. He held this post from 27 April 1920 to 6 March 1921. Then he held other government posts.
