= Turkoman Revolt of 1912–1913 =

The Turkoman Revolt of 1912–1913 was a revolt by Yomud Turkomans against the Khanate of Khiva. Its causes lay in opposition to the taxation reforms of Isfandiyar Jurji Bahadur, which had resulted in the doubling or tripling of the amount of taxes the Yomud Turkomans needed to pay. It began on 12 December 1912 (25 December 1912, N.S.) when rebels attacked and plundered a caravan heading from Tashauz to Takhta. After the revolt broke out, the Khivan government was split between pro-compromise and pro-war parties, of which the latter prevailed. The subsequent punitive expedition faced resistance from 300-500 rebel fighters led by Shammi-kel, who occupied a strongly fortified defensive position between Takhta and Ilyali and held the government forces off for 20 days. A Russian force under Colonel Lykoshin was then dispatched to Khiva to aid the government by providing munitions. Although his forces had not been defeated, Russia's support for Isfandiyar convinced Shammi-kel to seek peace with the government. In the peace agreement of 25 January 1913 (7 February 1913, N.S.), mediated by Colonel Lykoshin, the Khivan government agreed to rescind the tax reforms, while the rebels agreed to pay 110,000 tillas (198,000 rubles) to the Khivan government.
