= Isfandiyar Khan =

Khan of Khiva from 1910 to 1918

Isfandiyar Khan Асфандияр-хан (Russian) Isfandiyar-Xon (Uzbek)
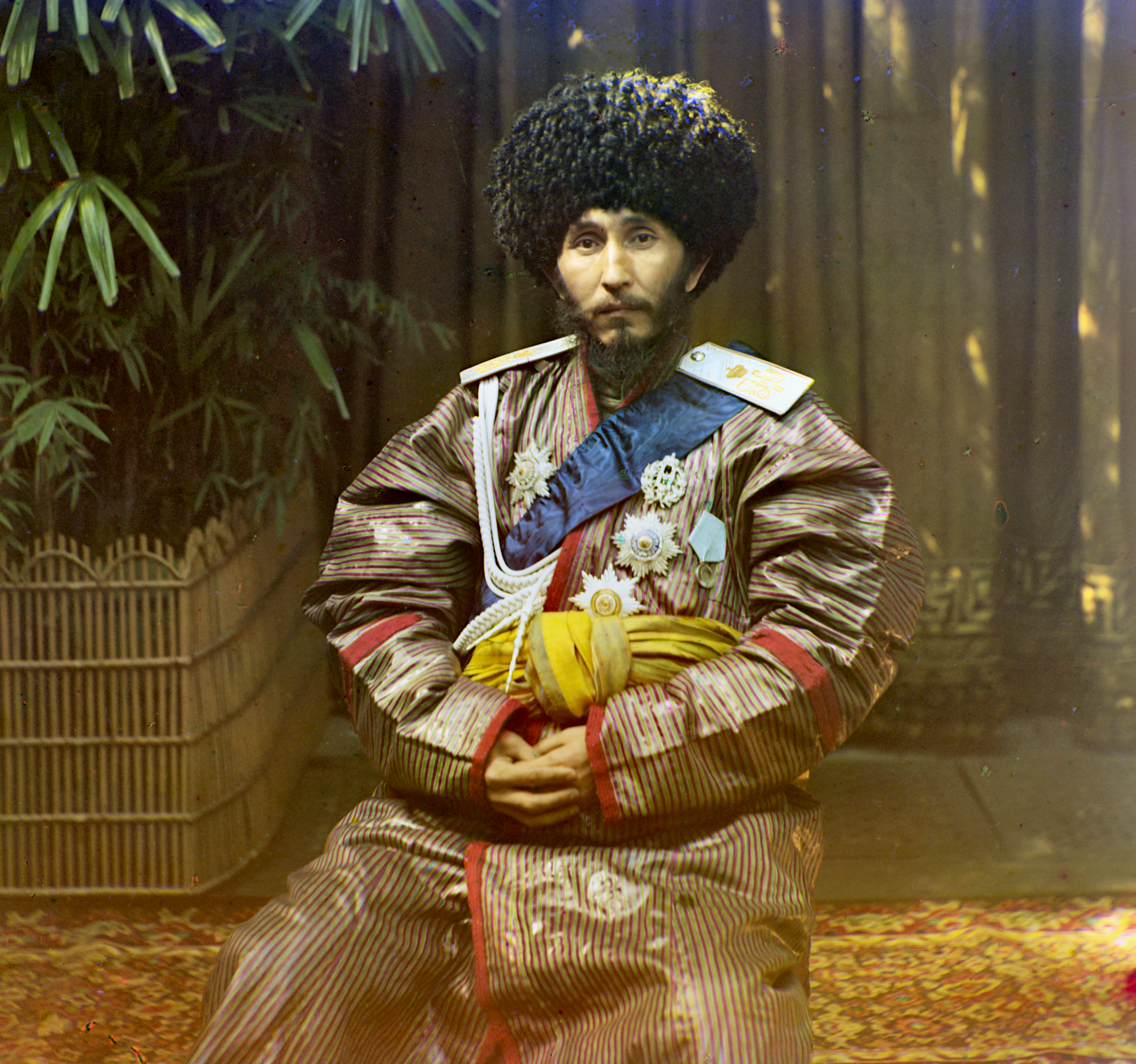
- Isfandiyar Khan in the Winter Garden of the Small Hermitage, Saint Petersburg, 21 February 1913

Khan of Khiva
- Reign: September 1910 – 1 October 1918
- Predecessor: Muhammad Rahim Khan II
- Successor: Sayid Abdullah
- Born: 1871; Khiva, Khanate of Khiva (present-day Uzbekistan)
- Died: 1 October 1918 (aged 46–47); Nurullabai Palace
- House: Khongirad (Uzbeks)
- Father: Muhammad Rahim Khan II
- Religion: Sunni Islam

Isfandiyar Khan, or Asfandiyar Khan (Turki and Persian: اسفندیار خان; 1871 – 1 October 1918), born Isfandiyar Jurji Bahadur, was the Khan of Khiva between September 1910 and 1 October 1918, the 53rd Khan of Khiva, and the 12th Khongirad ruler of the Khiva. He was overthrown and executed by Junaid Khan in 1918.

== Biography ==
In 1910, after the death of his father, Muhammad Rahim Khan II, Isfandiyar Khan came to power in Khiva. Unlike his father, he did not have many special talents. Initially, the enlightened vizier Islam Khodja played a large role in the running of the state. Using his money, a cotton gin plant, a hospital, a post mail, a telegraph and a secular school were built. Between 1908 and 1910, Islam Khodja built an ensemble of buildings in the Southeast of Itchan Kala, consisting of the smallest madrasa and the largest minaret in Khiva. Islam Khodja was later killed without Isfandiyar Khan's consent.

Tsar Nicholas II awarded Isfandiyar Khan with the Orders of Saint Stanislaus and Saint Anna. In 1910, Isfandiyar was awarded the title of Major-General of the Russian Empire. In 1911, he was enrolled in the Tsar's retinue. In 1913, he received the title of Royal Highness from the Tsar.

In 1912, the Khanate of Khiva faced a revolt by Yomud Turkomans. It ended in 1913.

The February Revolution in Russia influenced the Khanate of Khiva. On April 5, 1917, the Young Khivans presented Isfandiyar Khan with demands for reform. The Khan was forced to publish a manifesto in which he promised to create a representative body - the Majlis, which also included members of the Young Khivans. The power of the Khan was limited by this document. The chairman of the Majlis was Young Khivan politician Boboahun Salimov. However, as Isfandiyar was a conservative, he hindered the reforms as much as he could. Many were dissatisfied with Isfandiyar Khan's actions, especially after the October Revolution, when Khivans learned about the reforms in Russia. Eventually, the political situation escalated to the point where reactionary forces took over. As a result, the Young Khiva government was overthrown and all the reforms Isfandiyar Khan announced were cancelled.

However, the leader of the Turkmen Yomud tribe, Junaid Khan, had returned to Khiva. He launched a coup in Spring 1918 and was appointed commander of the armed forces of the Khanate, and took power almost effortlessly, soon concentrating all the power in his hands. With Isfandiyar Khan executed by Junaid Khan in Nurullabai Palace, his brother, Sayid Abdullah, became Khan.

== Cultural policies ==
During the reign of Isfandiyar Khan, new madrasas and mosques were built in Khiva. In 1912, he built the complex of Narallabay Palace (also known as the Isfandiyar Palace), in the form of a separate building which housed several ceremonial halls in rooms of various shapes. Among them, there was the throne room, built and decorated in a modern Russian style. Isfandiyar Khan ordered many elements of the new building from the St. Petersburg Imperial Porcelain Factory.

Photographer and first Khivan film director Khudaibergen Devanov shot the first documentary about Isfandiyar Khan with his heir riding in the front of a car in 1910.

Together with the Emir of Bukhara Mohammed Alim Khan, Isfandiyar Khan took part in the opening of the Saint Petersburg Mosque on February 22, 1913.

== Awards ==
- Order of the White Eagle
- Order of Saint Anna
- Order of Saint Stanislaus

== Gallery ==
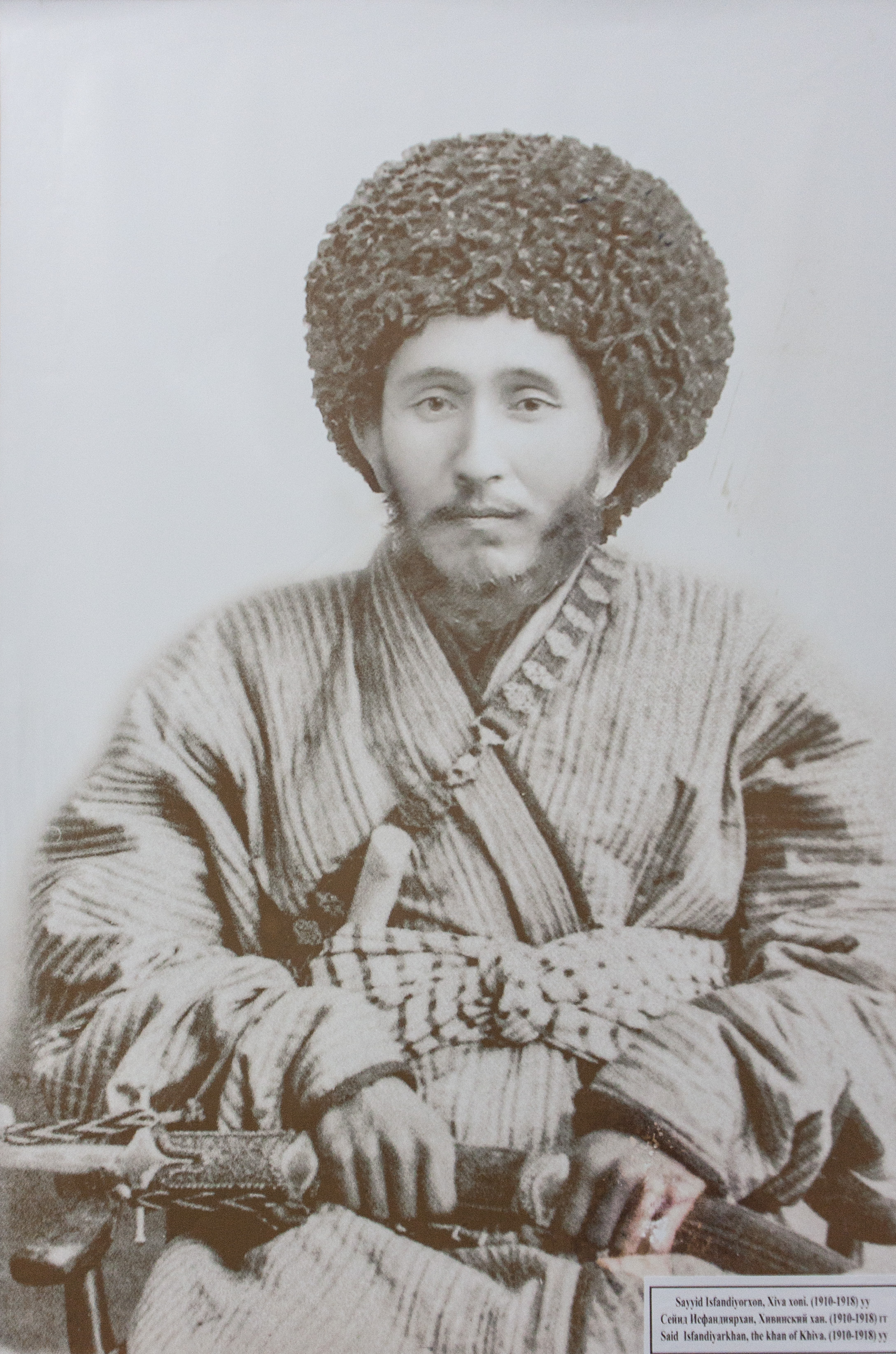
Portrait of Isfandiyar Khan

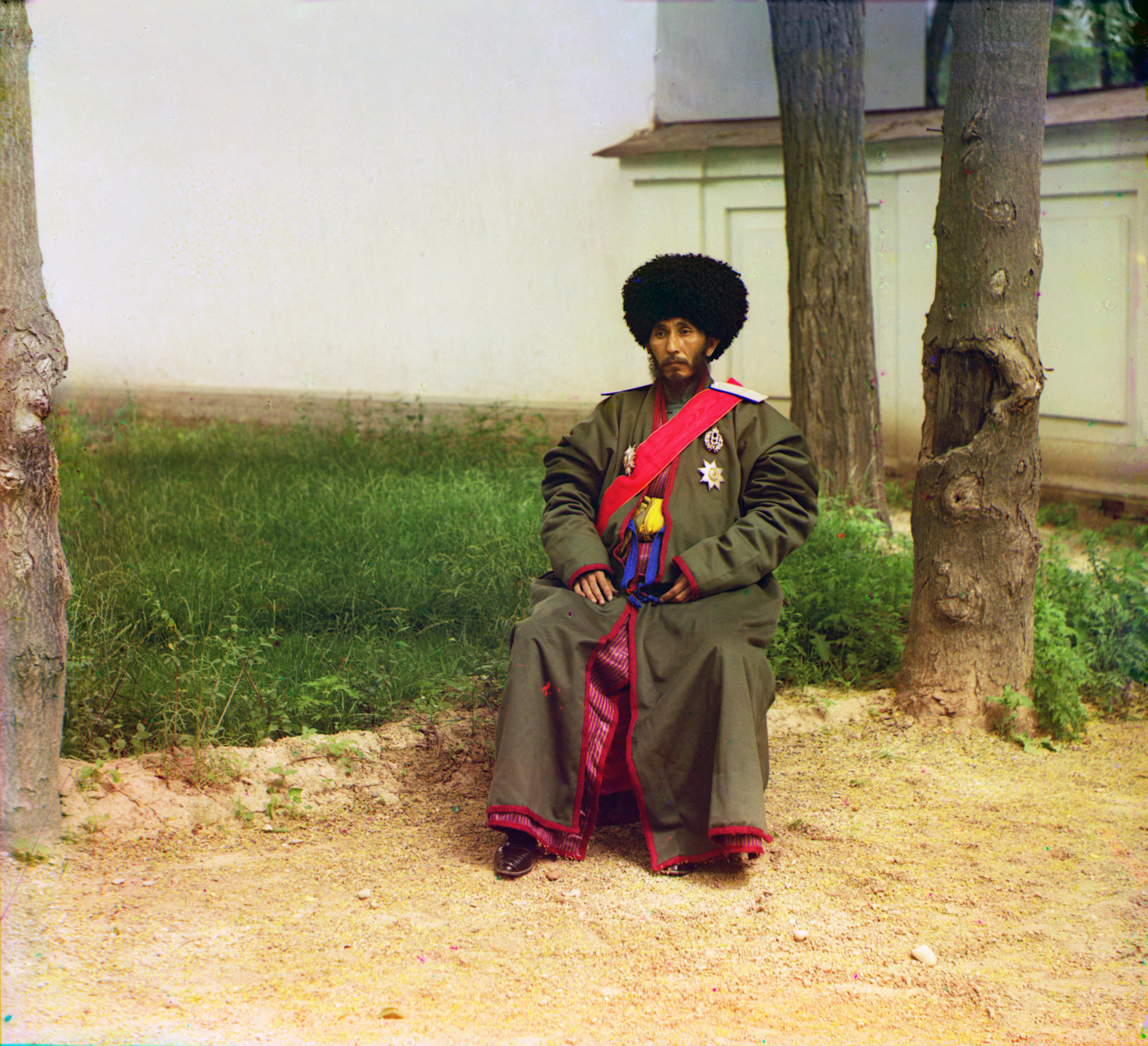
Isfandiyar Khan in St. Petersburg
S.M. Prokudin-Gorsky, May 26–30, 1911

Preceded by Muhammad Rahim Khan II	Khan of Khiva; 1910–1918	Succeeded by Sayid Abdullah
