= Khudaibergen Devanov =

Uzbek photographer and filmmaker

- Xudoybergan Devonov
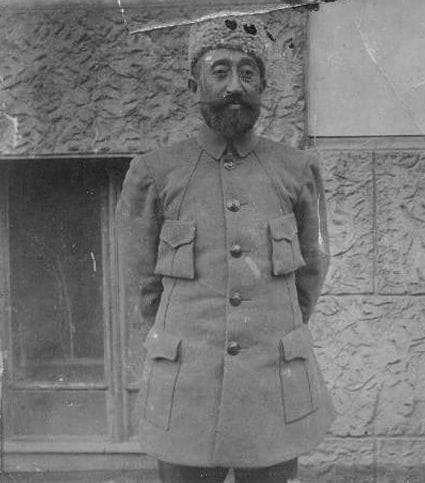
- A picture of Khudaibergen Devanov
- Born: 1879; Khiva
- Died: 1940 (aged 60–61); Tashkent
- Occupations: Filmmaker, photographer

Khudaibergen Devanov (Uzbek: Xudoybergan Devonov; Russian: Худайберген Деванов; 1879—1940) was a pioneering Uzbek photographer, cinematographer, filmmaker and cameraman. He is regarded as a great figure of culture in his home of Khiva, responsible for taking photos of his city and its figures.

== Early life ==
Khudaibergen Devanov was born in 1879 into the family of the secretary of Haman and manager of and superintendent of possessions at Khojeyli, Nurmuhammad Devan. He received an education at home, where he learned Persian and Arabic. He was fond of poetry and tried to write some. He learned how to play almost all traditional Uzbek instruments. He enjoyed gardening, and almost 10 varieties of flowers were grown in his family garden according to artist Madrahim Yakubov Sheroziy. From the age of 6 and 7, he took a liking to science.

He learned how to read and write in Russian between the ages of 14 and 15, and he studied German from German-speaking Mennonites in Khiva living at the White Mosque. His first teacher was Volga German photographer and filmmaker Wilhelm Penner, who introduced him to photography and camera work.

== Filmmaking ==
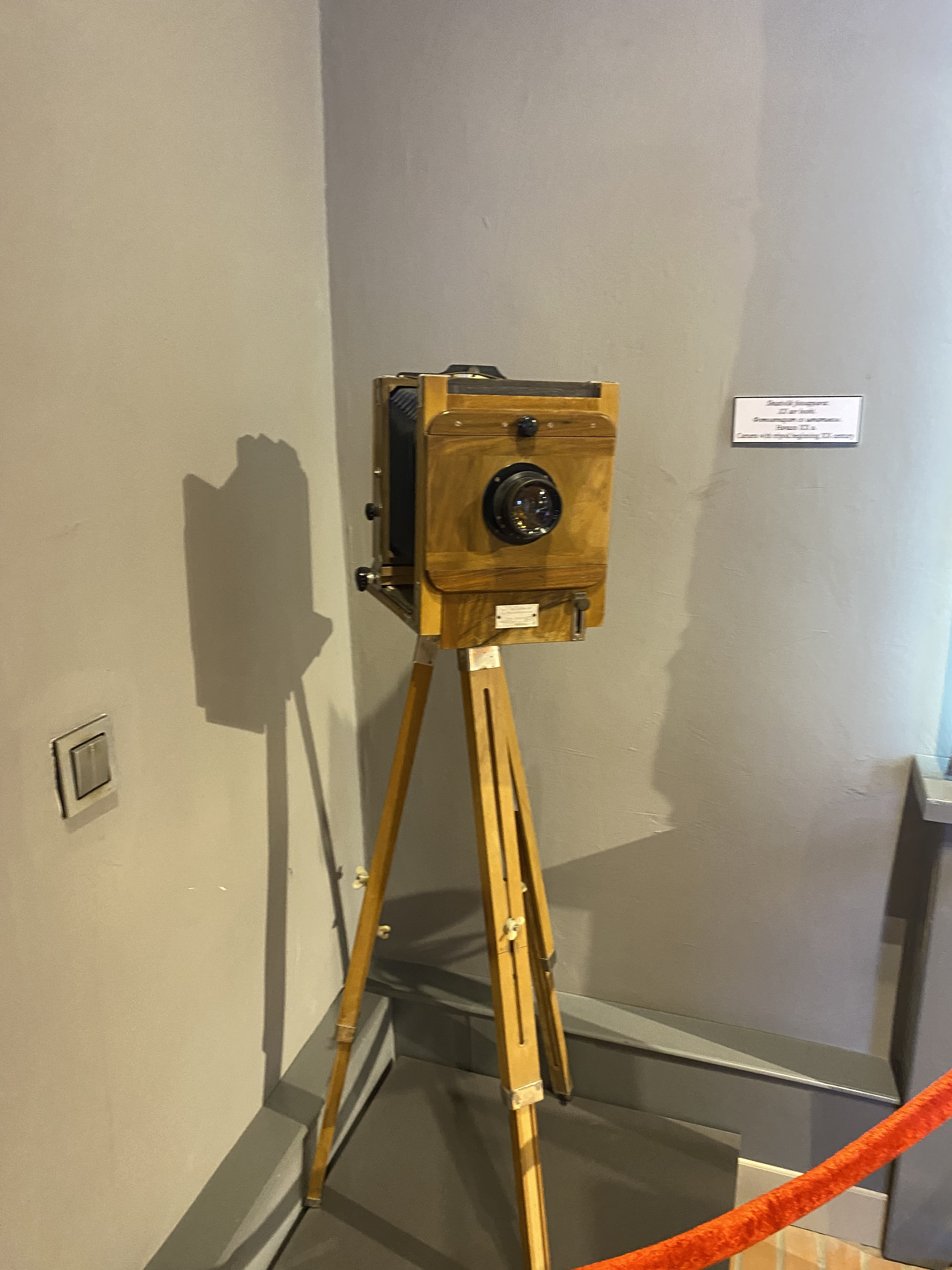
prince's fathers camera

In the conservative Islamic society of Khiva, where there was a religious ban on the depiction of all things animated, Devanov managed to pursue his hobby of photography.

Devanov visited St. Petersburg in 1908 as a delegation from the Khiva Khanate. In the capital of the Russian Empire, Devanov was introduced to the intricacies of photographic works and studied with Russian professionals. After completing his work as a part of the delegation, he stayed in St. Petersburg for 2 months for an internship. He brought back various film and photography accessories, including PATE brand movie camera No. 593, which allowed him to independently shoot the first Uzbek documentary. He filmed Isfandiyar Khan leaving for a phaeton in 1910. His first films “Monuments of Architecture of our Region” (114 meters, 1913), “Types of Turkestan” (100 meters, 1916), etc. were also preserved.

1908 was the birth of Uzbek cinema. Devanov filmed and photographed different mosques, historical sights, and minarets, publicizing the culture and sights of Khiva.

== Death and legacy ==
In 1936, Devanov started to receive a pension due to his old age. The members of the party Polyazxoji Khiva Yusupov, Sholikarov, Mulla Bekchan Raxmanov, Otajanov, as well as Akmal Ikramov and Fayzulla from Uzbekistan, joined forces with Devanov against Stalinist economics, saying the state was the enemy of the people. In 1938, he was sent to a political prisoner camp in Yangiyul. He was shot in Zangiata District, Tashkent, in 1940. Devanov and his companions were rehabilitated in 1958. He now has an exhibition dedicated to him at the Ichan Kala Museum in Khiva.
