= Khiva =

City in Xorazm Region, western Uzbekistan

Khiva Xiva / Хива (Uzbek)
- District-level city
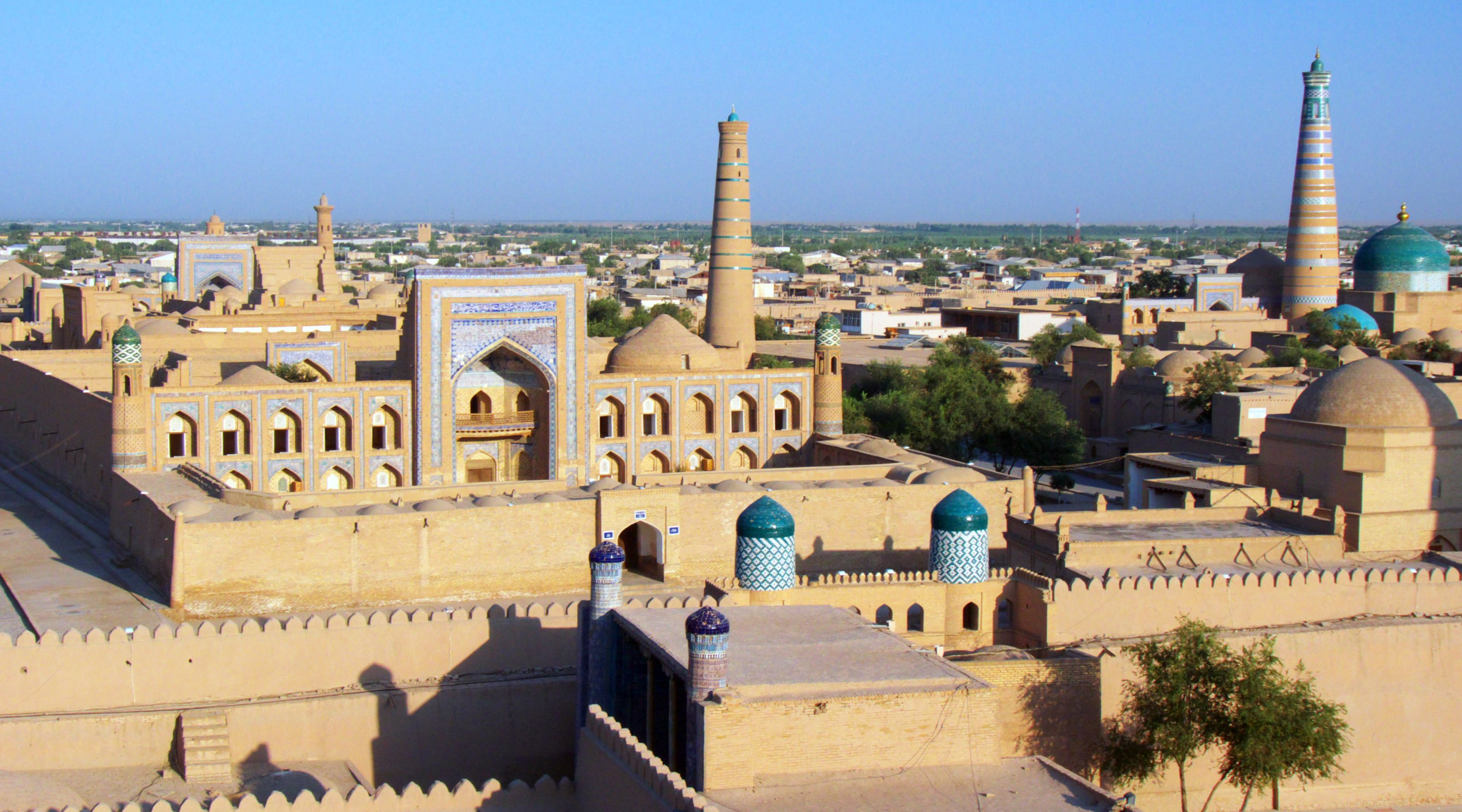
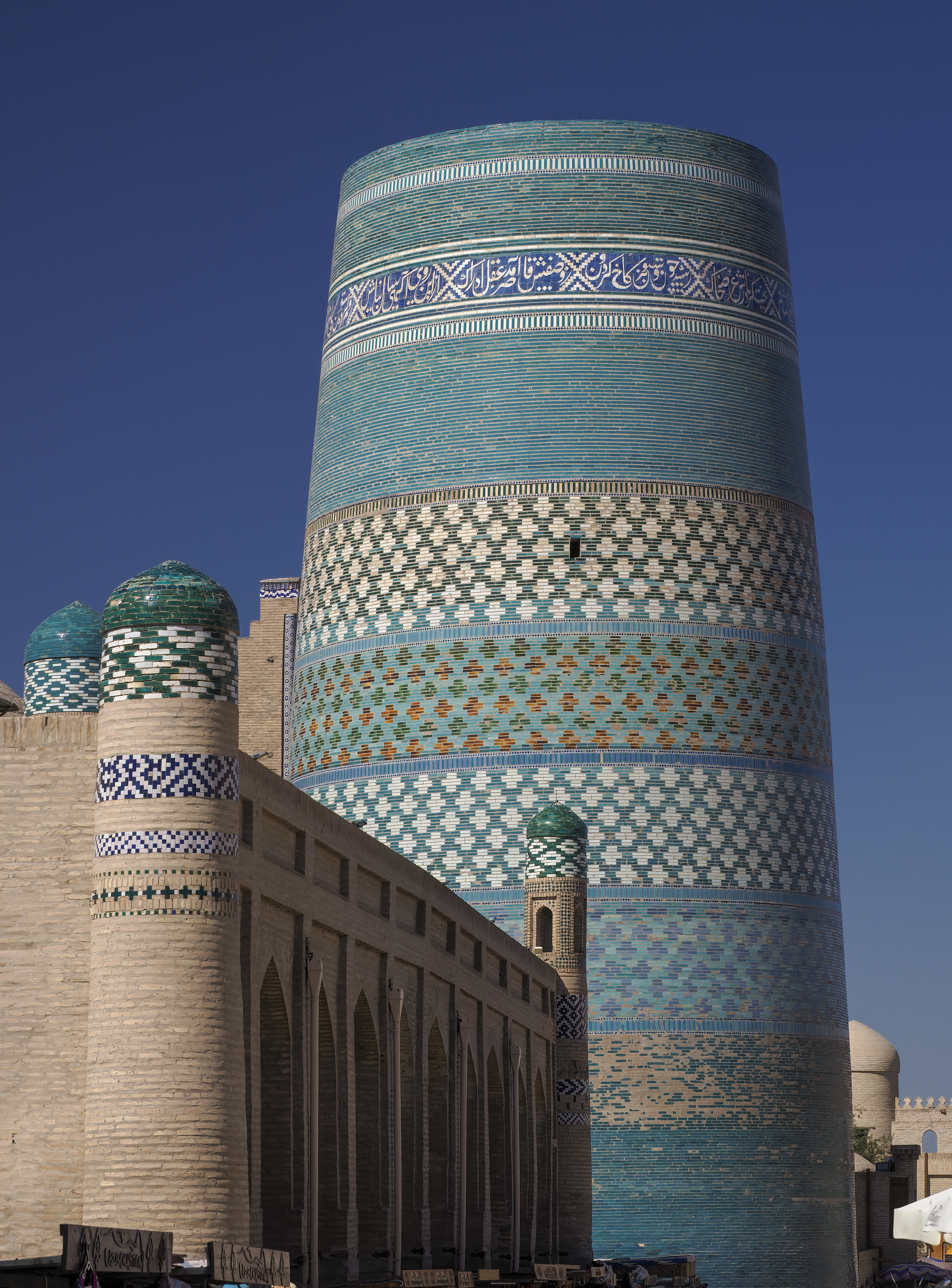
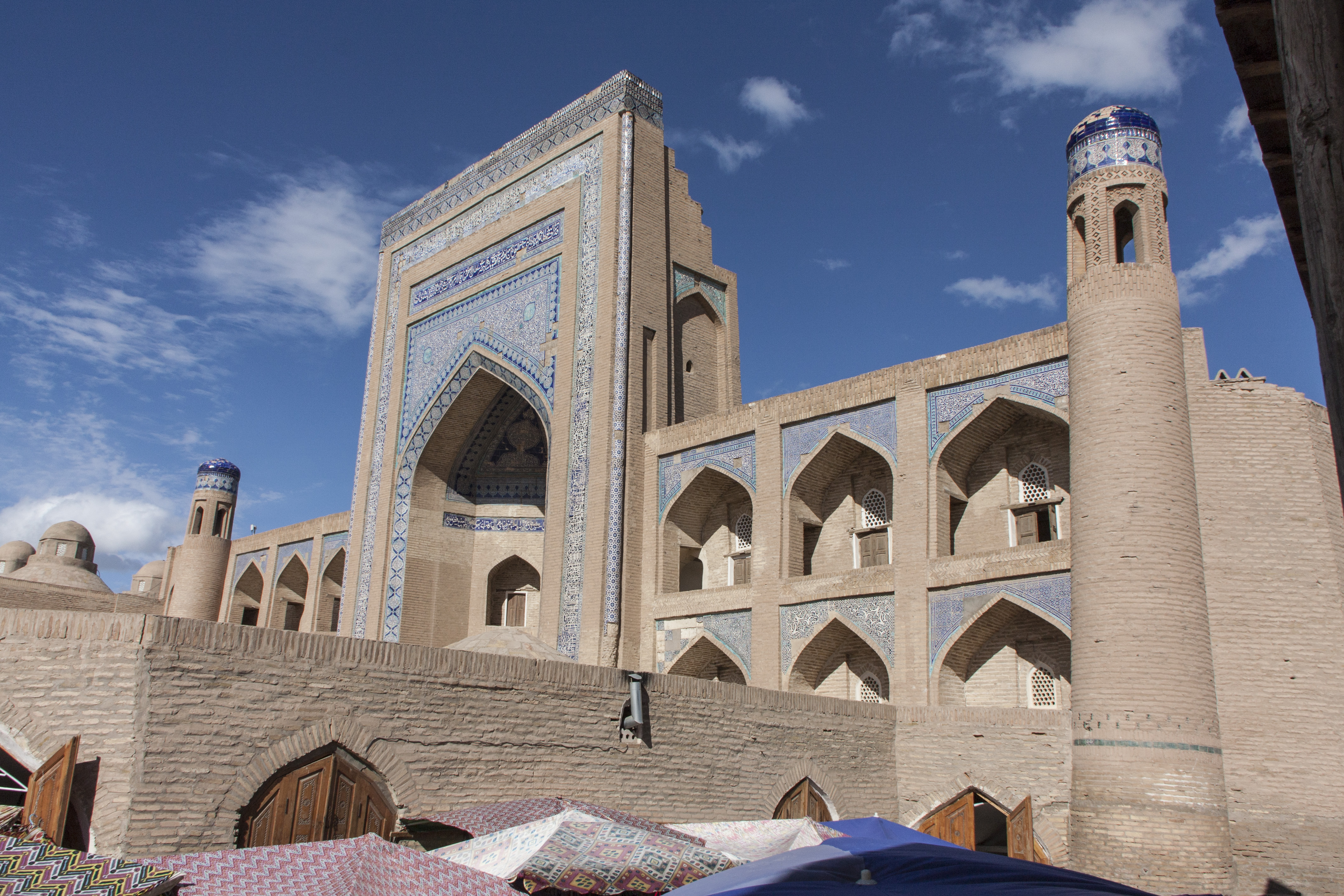
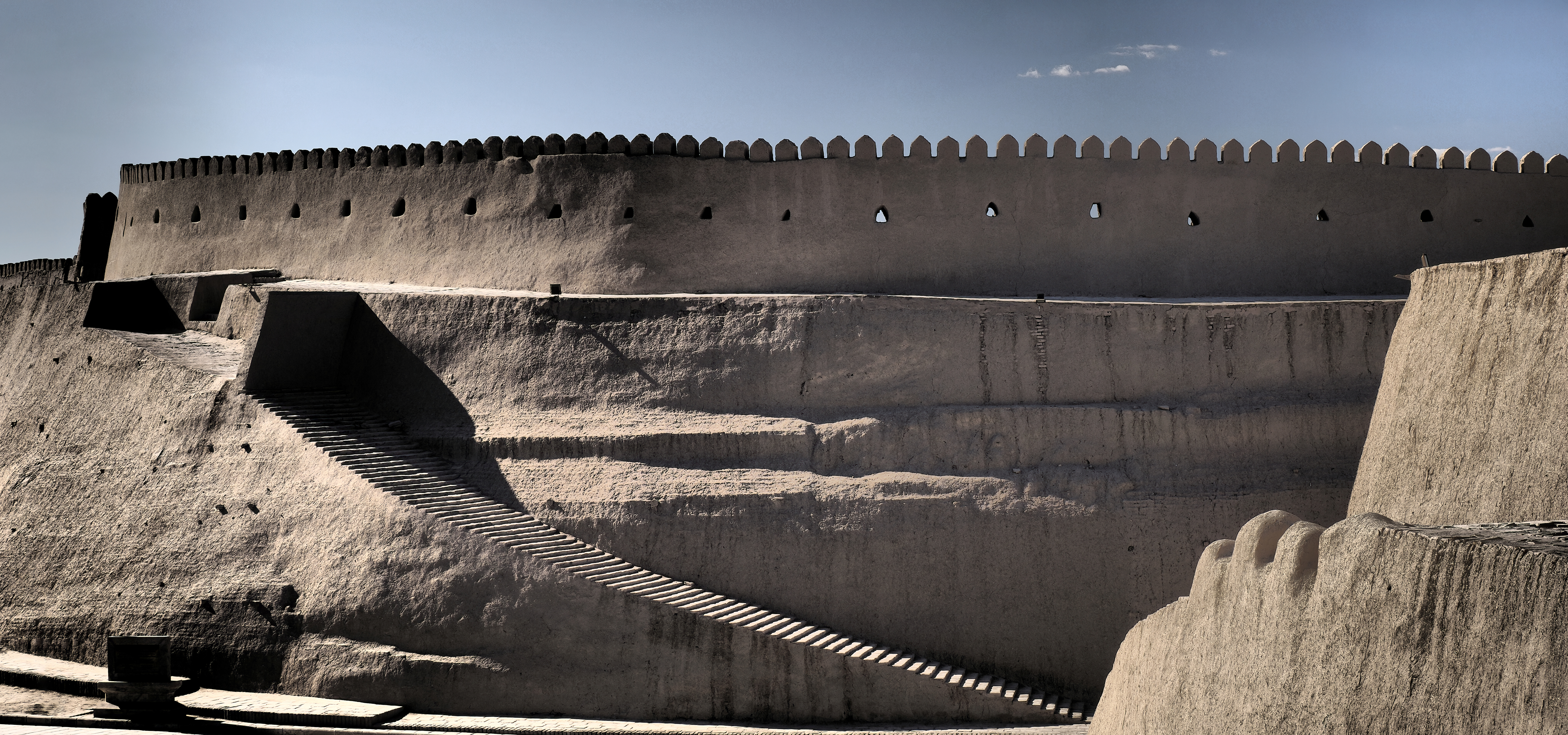
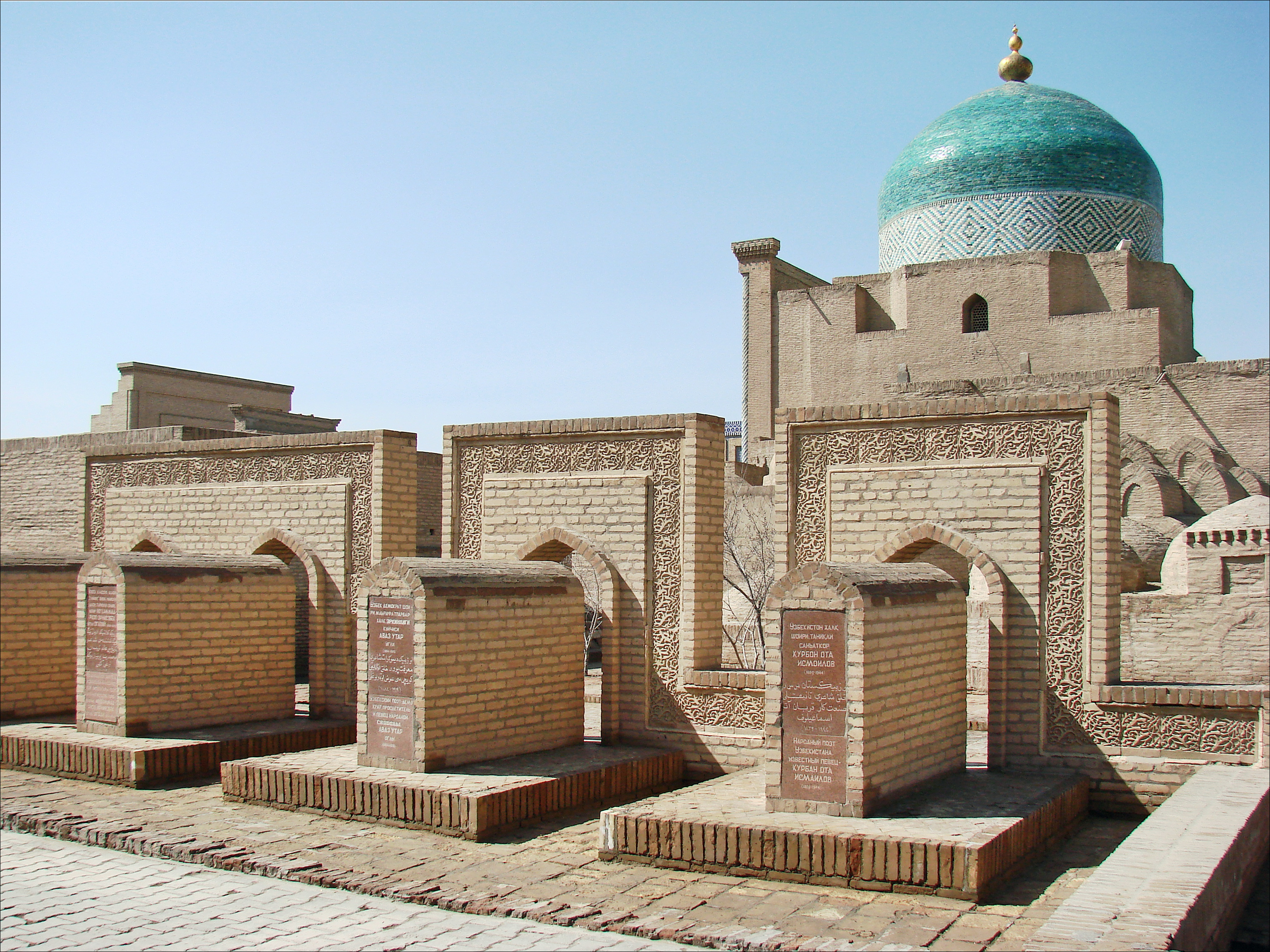
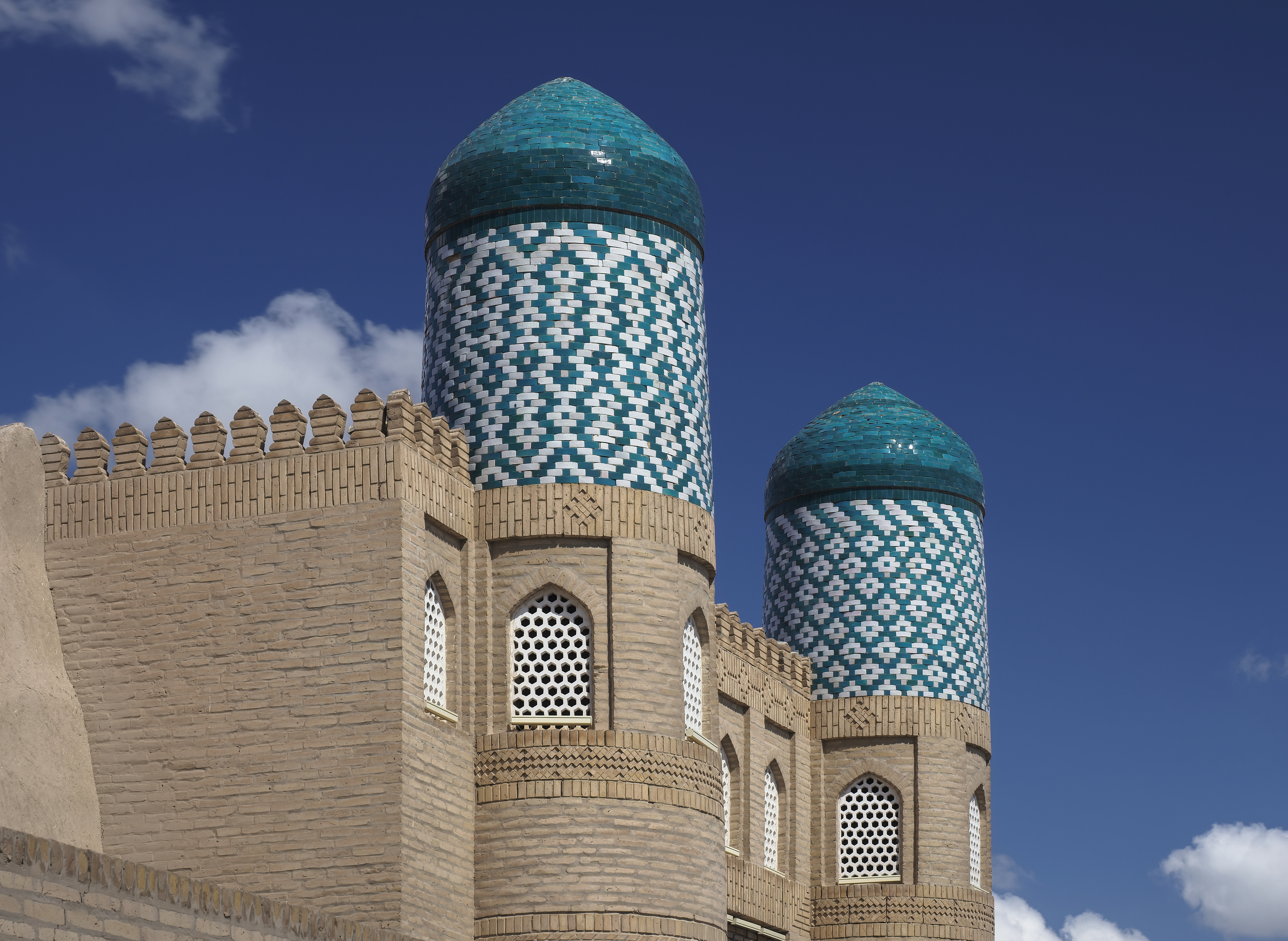
- Itchan Kala Kalta Minor Minaret Allakuli-Khan Madrasah Tim-Allakuli Khan Itchan Kala Walls Muhammad Aminkhan Madrasah Konya Ark Towers

- Location in Uzbekistan Khiva (West and Central Asia)
- Coordinates: 41°22′53″N 60°21′40″E
- Country: Uzbekistan
- Region: Khorazm
- Founded: 6th century BC

Government
  - Type: City Administration
  - Hakim: Temur Davletov

Population (2021)
  - Total: 115,000
- Demonym(s): Khivan; Khorezmian
- Time zone: UTC+05:00
  - Summer (DST): UZT
- Postal code: 220900
- Area code: (+998) 62
- Website: https://xivashahar.uz/

Khiva (Uzbek: Xiva, Хива, خیوه; other names) is a district-level city of approximately 93,000 people in Khorazm Region, Uzbekistan. According to archaeological data, the city was established around 2,500 years ago.

In 1997, Khiva celebrated its 2,500th anniversary. It is the former capital of Khwarezmia, the Khanate of Khiva, and the Khorezm People's Soviet Republic. Itchan Kala in Khiva was the first site in Uzbekistan (and in Central Asia) to be inscribed on the World Heritage List (1991). The Iranian astronomer, historian and polymath Al-Biruni (973–1048 CE) was born in either Khiva or the nearby city of Kath.

== Etymology ==
The origin of the name Khiva is unknown, but many contradictory stories have been told to explain it.

A traditional story attributes the name to one of the sons of the prophet Noah: "It is said that Shem, after the flood, he found himself wandering in the desert alone. Having fallen asleep, he dreamt of 300 burning torches. On waking up, he was pleased with this omen, he founded the city with outlines in the form of a ship mapped out according to the placement of the torches, about which he had dreamt. Then Shem dug the Kheyvak well, the water from which had a surprising taste. It is possible to see this well in Ichan-Kala (an internal town of Khiva City) even today."

Another proposal is that the name comes from the Persian word Khwarezm, altered by borrowing into Turkic as Khivarezem, then shortened to Khiva.

The town is also known as Persian: خیوه, Xīveh; alternative and historical names include Orgunje, Kheeva, Khorasam, Khoresm, Khwarezm, Khwarizm, Khwarazm, Chorezm, Persian: خوارزم.

== History ==
Archeologists have stated that Khiva has been inhabited for more than 2500 years.

In the early part of its history, the Eastern Iranian language Khwarezmian was spoken in Khiva. Turkic peoples replaced the Iranian ruling class in the 10th century AD, and the region gradually turned into an area with a majority of Turkic speakers.

The earliest records of the city of Khiva appear in Muslim travel accounts from the 10th century although archaeological evidence indicates habitation in the 6th century; by the early 17th century, Khiva had become the capital of the Khanate of Khiva. The khanate was ruled by the Uzbek “Kongirad” dynasty.

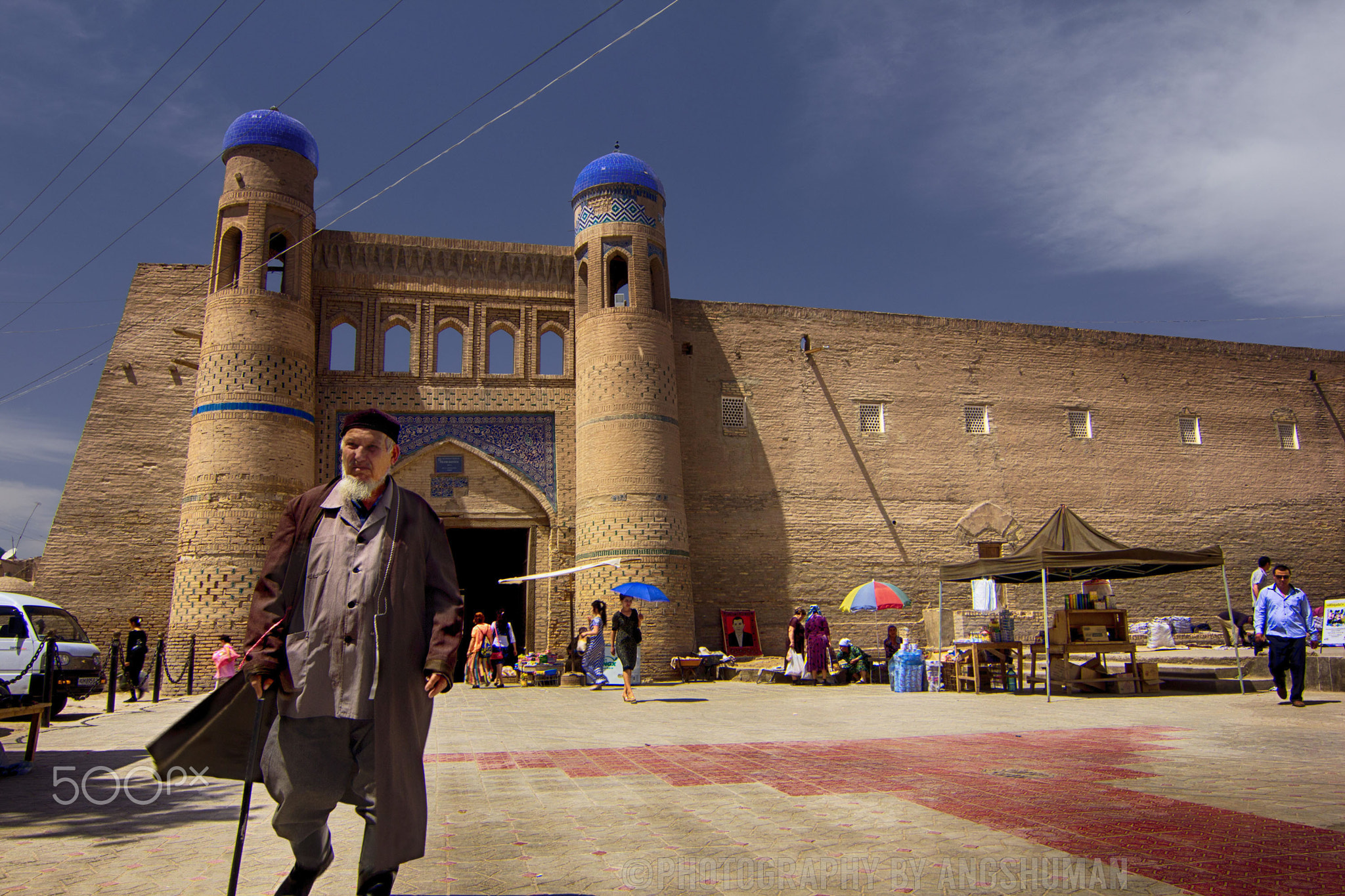
2014 Image of Palvan Gate Of Khiva, built in the early 19th century and known to have hosted a large slave market and a center of punishments and executions

In the 17th century, Khiva began to develop as a slave market. For several centuries, the cities of Bukhara and Khiva were known as major centers of the slave trade, and the Bukhara slave trade, alongside the neighboring slave trade in Khiva, has been referred to as the "slave capitals of the world". During the first half of the 19th century, around 30,000 Persians and an unknown number of Russians, were enslaved there before being sold. A large part of them were involved in the construction of buildings in the walled Itchan Kala.

Russia annexed some parts of the Khanate of Khiva in the 19th century, vassalising it into the Russian protectorate. The last khan from the ruling dynasty was liquidated a century later, in 1919. Thus Khiva became the capital city of the new Khorezm People's Soviet Republic. The Khorezm oasis was converted into a part of modern Uzbekistan and Turkmenistan in 1924.

=== Campaigns ===
In the course of the Russian conquest of Central Asia, in 1873 the Russian General Konstantin von Kaufman launched an attack on the city of Khiva, which fell on 28 May 1873. Although the Russian Empire controlled the Khanate, it allowed Khiva to remain as a nominally quasi-independent protectorate.

Following the Bolshevik seizure of power in Russia after the October Revolution of 1917, a short-lived (1920–1924) Khorezm People's Soviet Republic formed out of the territory of the old Khanate of Khiva before its incorporation into the USSR in 1924. The city of Khiva became part of the Uzbek Soviet Socialist Republic.

== Sights ==
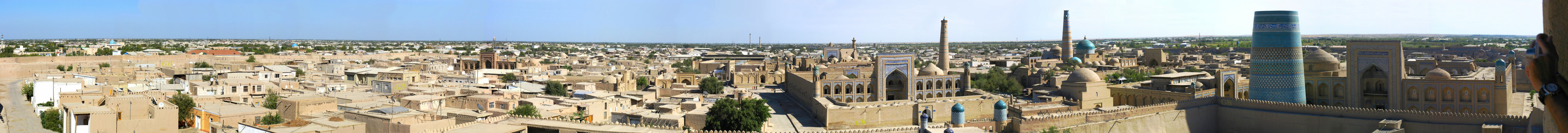
Panoramic view of Khiva (Uzbekistan)

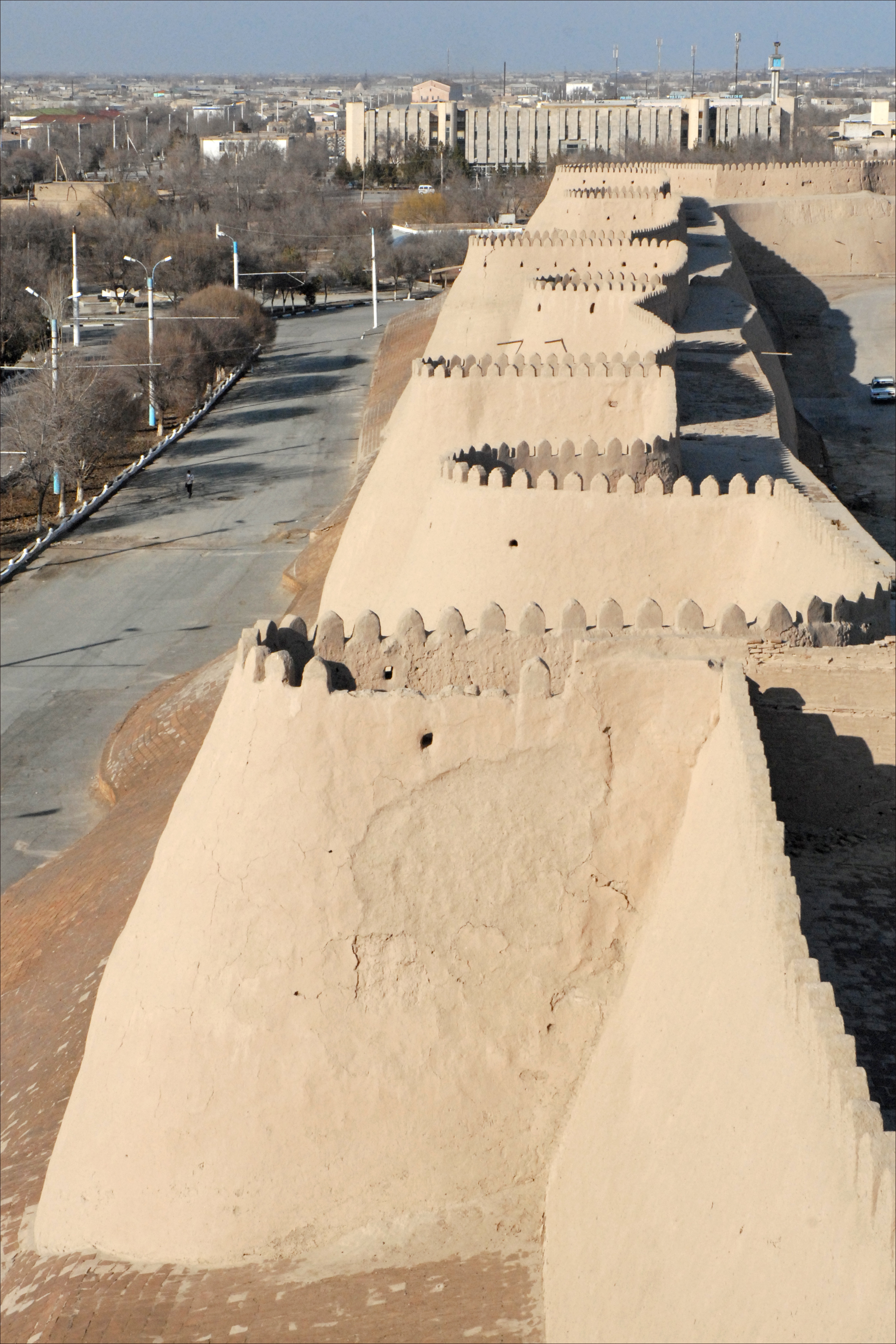
City wall

Khiva is split into two parts. The outer town, called Dichan Kala, was formerly protected by a wall with 11 gates. The inner town, or Itchan Kala, is encircled by brick walls, whose foundations are believed to have been laid in the 10th century. Present-day crenellated walls date back to the late 17th century and attain the height of 10 meters.

Kalta Minor, the large blue tower in the central city square, was supposed to be a minaret. It was built in 1851 by Mohammed Amin Khan, but the Khan died and the succeeding Khan did not complete it.

The old town retains more than 50 historic monuments and 250 old houses, mostly dating from the 18th or 19th centuries. Djuma Mosque, for instance, was established in the 10th century and rebuilt in 1788–89, although its celebrated hypostyle hall still retains 112 columns taken from ancient structures.

Khiva was home to a number of madrassahs (educational establishments), one of which, Sherghazi Khan madrassah, still stands today. It was built in the 18th century by slaves and is one of the oldest buildings in Ichan-Kala, which is the center of present-day Khiva. Among the renowned students of the madrassah were the Uzbek poet Raunaq, the Qaraqalpaq poet Kasybayuly, the Turkmen poet and sufi Magtymguly.

== Industry and production ==
In the town, activities such as the KhivaCarpet joint-stock company, cotton cleaning, ginning factories, carpet weaving, the Khiva Gilami joint-stock company, and other carpet-weaving enterprises, as well as a bread factory, a farmer's market, cultural, trade, and service establishments are operational. There are branches of Urgench University specializing in agro-management, the Uzbek Academy of Sciences Khorezm Mamun Academy, the Qoraqum Scientific Research Station, pedagogical, medical, and tourism colleges, vocational lyceums, a gymnasium, fifteen general education schools, a house of culture, two special boarding schools, a regional puppet theater, an art school, two libraries and their branches, and cultural and recreational gardens.

The central hospital, polyclinic, maternity hospital, children's hospital, dental treatment center, central pharmacy, specialized clinics, and other medical facilities are available in the district. Historical and architectural sites in the area include the Sayd Alauddin mausoleum, the Pahlavon Mahmud Complex, the Juma Mosque, the Old Ark, Oqshayx Bobo's Palace, Toshhovli Palace, Nurullabai Palace, Muhammad Aminxon Madrasah, Muhammad Rahimxon Madrasah, Islamkhodja Madrasah and Minaret, Olloqulixon Madrasah, Qutlughmurad Inoq Madrasah, Olloqulixon Caravanserai and its market, Anushakhan Bathhouse, Oq Mosque, Polvon Gate, Ota Gate, Bogcha Gate, Tosh Gate, Hazorasp Gate, Kush Gate, and more.

The town publishes the Khiva-Sharq Gavhari magazine (since 2001) and the Khiva Tongi district newspaper. The town is a prominent center for global tourism, attracting over 200,000 tourists every year, including nearly 7,000 international visitors. "O'zbekTurizm" national company operates in the town, and several private guesthouses are in operation.

== Transportation ==
A trolleybus line was established from Khiva to Urgench in 1997. Bus and minibus routes connect Khiva to Tashkent, Bukhara, Navoi, Samarkand, Urgench, Qo'shko'pir, Yangiariq, Bog'ot, Hazorasp, and other major cities and population centers in the region.

A new bullet-train is being planned, connecting Khiva to Bukhara and Samarkand. Khiva is a part of the Silk Road Caravan Trail.

The nearest airport is Urgench International Airport.

=== Rail ===
Khiva is served by the Khiva railway station. The Jaloliddin Manguberdi electric express train (train Nos. 753/754) operates between Tashkent and Khiva.

Additionally, direct commuter rail service (train Nos. 7055/7056) connects Khiva with Urgench International Airport, scheduled to connect with flight arrivals and long-distance trains.

== Archaeological and cultural significance ==
Khwarazm was an important center on the Silk Road. The Persian architectural monuments of Khiva have earned the title of "museum city". Surviving buildings are mostly from the late 18th and early 19th centuries, during the Khiva Khanate, but archaeological excavations suggest that some younger buildings are built on foundations from the 3rd century BC or earlier.

== Overview of architectural monuments of Khiva ==
Most of Khiva's important buildings are concentrated in its urban core – Itchan Kala – a "city within a city" surrounded by powerful fortress walls with gates on each of the four sides.

One of the main highways runs from the western gate to the eastern gate, along which the main monumental buildings are concentrated. The observation tower of Ak-Sheikh-bobo Itchan-Kala provides views over the city, including the unusual silhouette of the Kalta Minor minaret. Its massive trunk, decorated with wide and narrow belts of glazed brick, suggests that it was conceived as the main vertical of the city. After the death of the khan, under whom the minaret was built, it remained unfinished, receiving the name of Kalta (short).

Very close to the Kalta Minar is the Muhammad Aminxon Madrasah, the largest of the preserved buildings of higher theological educational institutions. Its twin hudjras, cells for student living, are notable aspects of its architecture. Belts of colored brick and majolica facings decorate the building.

On the territory of Konya Ark (Old Fortress) is the palace of Muhammad Rahimxon I with rich and unusual interior decoration. The walls of the hall are decorated with ganch carving with coloring. The neighboring two-storied building is a harem, with numerous rich chambers, living rooms.

The Juma Mosque (X century, 1788) was constructed in 1778–1782 years, as inscribed on its doors. The 210 column supporting the roof are much older, dating from the 12th to 15th centuries. The columns are slender and richly carved. They were brought here from other ancient buildings, so many columns are unique and do not resemble each other.

At the gates of Polvon darvoza is a whole ensemble of buildings. The main palace of Khiva khans Toshhovli occupies a special place here. It has ornamental wood carvings, majolica facings and figurative cartouches.

The Palace of Kurnysh-khan was intended for receptions for the elite. Once there was a wooden throne in the throne room decorated with silver chasing on a red background. The building has a iwan with columns. The palace has majolica wall lining with intricate ornaments.

The Pahlavon Mahmud Memorial Complex was built in memory of the revered Khiva poet, who after his death was canonized as the patron saint of the city.

Nearby is the 45-meter Islomxo‘ja minaret, topped with a through lantern with a dome on top. In the outer part of the city – Dishan qalʼa – are further ancient architectural monuments.

== Notable people from Khiva ==
The following people were born in the city.

- Tamara Abaeva (born 1927), historian.
- Sayid Abdullah (1873–1933), Khan of Khiva 1918–1920.
- Khudaibergen Devanov (1879–1940), photographer.
- Islam Khodja (1872–1913), Grand Vizier of the Khanate of Khiva.
- Israil Madrimov (born 1995), boxer.
- Bekjon Rakhmonov (1887–1929), politician.
- Palvanniyaz Khodja Yusupov (1861–1936), politician.
- Muhammad Rahim Khan II of Khiva, Khan of Khiva from 1864 to 1910

== Sister cities ==
The following is a list of Khiva's sister and twinned cities:

- Nishapur, Iran
- Yazd, Iran (2020)
- San Lorenzo del Escorial, Spain (2019)

== See also ==
- Al-Khwarizmi
- Bukhara
- Slavery in Asia#Central Asia and the Caucasus
- Trolleybuses in Urgench
- Abdolbobo Mausoleum
