= Muhammad Rahim Khan II of Khiva =

Khan of Khiva from 1864 to 1910

Muhammad Rahim Khan II
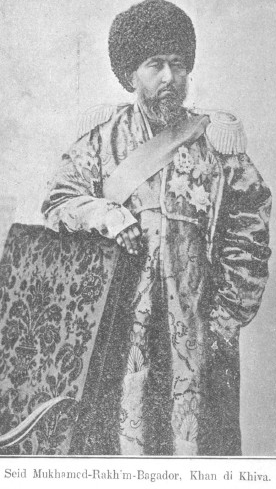
- Muhammad Rahim II in 1900/1901

Khan of Khiva
- Reign: 1864–1910
- Predecessor: Sayyid Muhammad Khan
- Successor: Isfandiyar Khan
- Born: c. 1847
- Died: 1910

Sayyid Muhammad Rahim Bahadur Khan II (Note: Turki and Persian: سید محمد رحیم بهادر خان ثانی) (c. 1847 – 1910) was Khan of Khiva of the Uzbek ”Kongirad” Dynasty from 1864 to 1910, succeeding his father Sayyid Muhammad Khan. Khiva was turned into a Russian protectorate during his rule, in 1873.

== Life ==
The reign of Muhammad Rahim II marked the peak of a cultural revival, during which "more than a hundred works were translated, mostly from Persian into Chagatai Turkic." Muhammad Rahim II introduced printing to Khiva in 1874. He was also "a munificent patron" and wrote poetry under the pen name Feruz.

Muhammad Rahim II also abolished the Khivan slave trade and slavery. When the Russian general Konstantin Petrovich von Kaufmann and his army approached the city of Khiva during the Khivan campaign of 1873, the Khan fled to hide among the Yomuts, and the slaves in Khiva rebelled, informed about the eminent downfall of the city. When Kaufmann's Russian army entered Khiva on 28 March, he was approached by Khivans who begged him to put down the ongoing slave uprising, during which slaves avenged themselves on their former enslavers. When the Khan returned to his capital after the Russian conquest, the Russian General Kaufmann presented him with a demand to abolish the Khivan slave trade and slavery, which he did.

== Excerpt from Ghazals ==
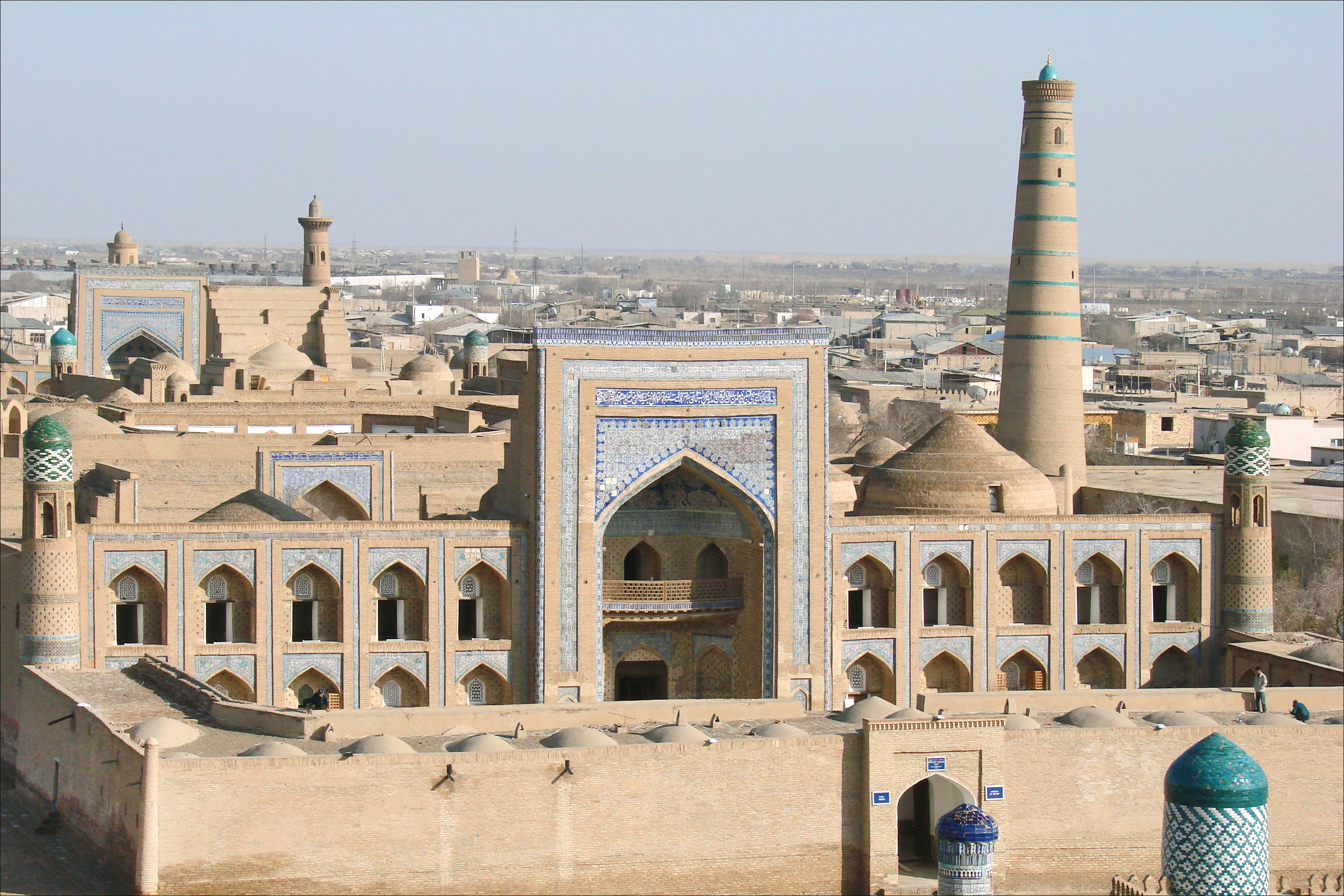
Madrasah of Muhammad Rakhim Khan II.

Below is one of Muhammad Rahim's ghazals in modern Uzbek Latin script:

Furqating soldi dil-u jon ichra oʻt,
Kufri zulfing din-u iymon ichra oʻt.

Nargisi shahlo koʻzung solgʻusidur,
Bir nigahdin bogʻ-u rizvon ichra oʻt.

Oh cheksam furqatingdin oʻrtanib,
Tushgusidur baytulahzon ichra oʻt.

Jurmim, ey mahvash, nedur, har dam solur
Barqi ishqing jismivayron ichra oʻt.

Oy kibi farrux yuzungning furqati
Soldi koʻkda mehri raxshon ichra oʻt.

Ne ajab, koʻrgach yuzing Feruzning
Ohidin tushsa guliston ichra oʻt.

— Adabiyot (Majmua). Vol. 2. Tashkent. 2010. pp. 358–359.

== Sources ==
- Auzias, Dominique; Labourdette, Jean-Paul (2017). ROUTE DE LA SOIE 2018/2019 Petit Futé (in French). Univ of California Press. ISBN 9780520300927.
- Degeorge, Gérard; Porter, Yves (2002). The art of the Islamic tile. Rizzoli International Publications. ISBN 9782080108760.
- Green, Nile (2019). The Persianate World. Petit Futé. ISBN 9791033178347.

Preceded by Sayyid Muhammad Khan	Khan of Khiva; 1864–1910	Succeeded by Isfandiyar Khan
