= Khwarazm =

Oasis region in Central Asia

Coordinates: 42°18′N 59°9′E

Khwarazm Chorasmia
- c. 1292 BCE – 1324 CE
- Location of the Khwarazm heartland in Central Asia

- Map of Khwarazm during the early Islamic period
- History
  - Established: c. 1292 BCE
  - Disestablished: 1324 CE
- Today part of: Turkmenistan; Uzbekistan

Khwarazm, (Note: /xwɑːˈræzm/; Old Persian: 𐎢𐎺𐎠𐎼𐏀𐎷𐎡𐏁, romanized: u-v-a-r-z-mi-i-š or: 𐎢𐎺𐎠𐎼𐏀𐎷𐎡𐎹, romanized: u-v-a-r-z-mi-i-y (/^{h}Uvārazmī-/); Later Middle Persian: 𐭧𐭥𐭥𐭦𐭬, romanized: ḥʿʿzm (/Xwārazm/); New Persian: خوارزم, romanized: Xwārazm) or Chorasmia, (Note: /xɒˈræzmiə/; Ancient Greek: Χορασμία, romanized: Chorasmía) is a large oasis region on the Amu Darya river delta in western Central Asia, bordered on the north by the (former) Aral Sea, on the east by the Kyzylkum Desert, on the south by the Karakum Desert, and on the west by the Ustyurt Plateau. The Iranian Khwarezmian civilization had its center here until the 9th century CE, when Turkic tribes moved into and ruled the lands. Cities such as Kath, Gurganj (now Konye-Urgench) and Khiva served as capitals for a series of dynasties, such as the Afrighids and the Anushtegin. In the 21st century, around two-thirds of Khwarazm belongs to Uzbekistan, while around a third forms part of Turkmenistan.

== Names and etymology ==
=== Names ===
Khwarazm has been known also as Chorasmia, Khaurism, Khwarezm, Khwarezmia, Khwarizm, Khwarazm, Khorezm, Khoresm, Khorasam, Kharazm, Harezm, Horezm, and Chorezm.

In Avestan the name is 𐬓𐬁𐬌𐬭𐬌𐬰𐬆𐬨, Xvairizəm; in Old Persian: 𐎢𐎺𐎠𐎼𐏀𐎷𐎡𐏁, romanized: u-v-a-r-z-mi-i-š or: 𐎢𐎺𐎠𐎼𐏀𐎷𐎡𐎹, romanized: u-v-a-r-z-mi-i-y (/^{h}Uvārazmī-/); in Later Middle Persian: 𐭧𐭥𐭥𐭦𐭬, romanized: ḥʿʿzm (/Xwārazm/); in New Persian: خوارزم, romanized: Xwārazm; in Arabic: خَوَارِزْم, romanized: Ḵawārizm; in Old Chinese *qʰaljɯʔmriɡ (呼似密); in Modern Chinese Huālázǐmó (花剌子模 / Xiao'erjing: خُوَلاذِمُوْ); in Tajik: Хоразм, Xorazm, خوارزم; in Kazakh: Хорезм, romanized: Xorezm, حورەزم; in Uzbek: Хоразм, romanized: Xorazm, حورەزم; in Turkmen: Хорезм, romanized: Horezm, خورزم; in Azerbaijani: Харәзм, romanized: Xarəzm, خارزم; in Turkish: Harezm; in Ancient Greek: Χορασμία, romanized: Chorasmía as well as: Χορασίμα, romanized: Chorasíma by Herodotus.

=== Etymology ===
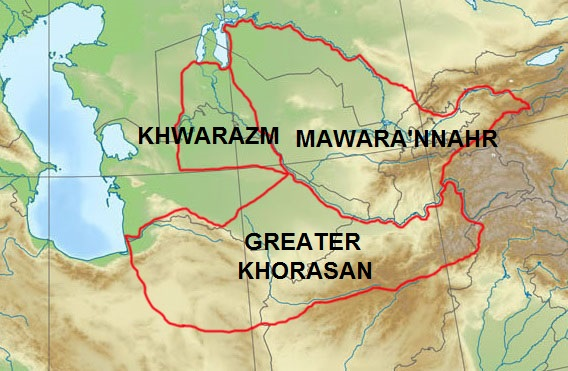
Mawara'nnahr, Khwarazm and Greater Khorasan

The Arab geographer Yaqut al-Hamawi in his Muʿjam al-Buldan wrote that the name was a Persian compound of xwār (خوار), and razm (رزم), referring to the abundance of cooked fish as a main diet of the peoples of this area.

C.E. Bosworth, however, thought the Persian name to be made up of xwar (خور 'the sun') and zam (زم 'earth, land'), designating 'the land from which the sun rises', although a similar etymology is also given for Khurasan. Another view is that the Iranian compound stands for 'lowland' from xwār 'low' and zam 'land'. Khwarazm is indeed the lowest region in Central Asia (except for the Caspian Sea to the far west), located on the delta of the Amu Darya on the southern shores of the Aral Sea. Various forms of xwar/xar/xor are commonly used in the Persian Gulf to stand for tidal flats, marshland, or tidal bays (e.g., Khor Musa, Khor Abdallah, Hor al-Azim, Hor al-Himar, etc.)

The name also appears in Achaemenid inscriptions as Huvarazmish, which is declared to be part of the Persian Empire.

Some of the early scholars assumed Khwarazm to be what ancient Avestic texts refer to as Airyanem Vaejah (Avestan: 𐬀𐬌𐬭𐬌𐬌𐬀𐬥𐬆𐬨⸱ 𐬬𐬀𐬉𐬘𐬀𐬵, romanized: Airiianəm Vaējah; Late Middle Persian: Ērān-wēj; New Persian: ایران‌ویج, romanized: Erān-wēj; Parthian: Aryānwēžan, 'the Arya Expanse (Note: The translation of Vaejah as 'expanse' is tentative. For other possibilities, see Airyanem Vaejah.)'). These sources claim that Old Urgench, which was the capital of ancient Khwarazm for many years, was actually Ourva, the eighth land of Ahura Mazda mentioned in the Pahlavi text of Vendidad. However, Michael Witzel, a researcher in early Indo-European history, claims that Airyanem Vaejah was in what is now Afghanistan, the northern areas of which were a part of ancient Khwarazm and Greater Khorasan. Others, however, disagree. University of Hawaiʻi historian Elton L. Daniel thinks Khwarazm to be the "most likely locale" corresponding to the original home of the Avestan people, and Dehkhoda calls Khwarazm "the cradle of the Aryan tribe" (مهد قوم آریا).

== History ==
=== Legendary ===
The Khwarezmian scholar Al-Biruni (973–1048) says that the land belonging to the mythical king Afrasiab was first colonised 980 years before Alexander the Great (thus c. 1292 BCE, well before the Seleucid era) when the hero of the Iranian epic Siyavash came to Khwarazm; his son Kay Khusraw came to the throne 92 years later, in 1200 BCE. Al-Biruni starts giving names only with the Afrighid line of Khwarazmshahs, having placed the ascension of Afrighids in 616 of the Seleucid era, i.e. in 305 CE.

=== Early people ===
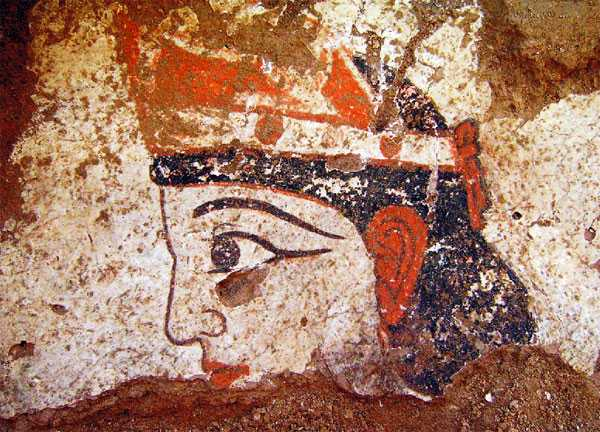
Chorasmian fresco from Kazakly-Yatkan (fortress of Akcha-Khan Kala), 1st century BCE-2nd century AD.

Like Sogdia, Khwarazm was an expansion of the Bactria–Margiana culture during the Bronze Age, which later fused with Indo-Iranians during their migrations around 1000 BCE. Early Iron Age states arose from this cultural exchange. List of successive cultures in Khwarazm region 3000–500 BCE:

- Kelteminar culture c. 3000 BCE
- Suyarganovo culture c. 2000 BCE
- Tazabagyab culture c. 1500 BCE
- Amirabad Culture c. 1000 BCE
- Saka c. 500 BCE

Kokcha-3 kurgans, belonging to Tazabagyab culture are located in the Tórtkúl District of Karakalpakistan in Uzbekistan. It is the largest burial ground of this archaeological culture and it provides much information on this period of Khwarazm.

During the final Saka phase, there were about 400 settlements in Khwarazm. Ruled by the native Afrighid dynasty, it was at this point that Khwarazm entered the historical record with the Achaemenid expansion.

==== Khwarezmian language and culture ====
An Eastern Iranian language, Khwarezmian was spoken in Khwarazm proper (i.e., the lower Amu Darya region) until soon after the Mongol invasion, when it was replaced by Turkic languages. It was closely related to Sogdian. Other than the astronomical terms used by the native Iranian Khwarezmian speaker Al-Biruni, Our other sources of Khwarezmian include al-Zamakhshari's Arabic–Persian–Khwarezmian dictionary and several legal texts that use Khwarezmian terms to explain certain legal concepts.

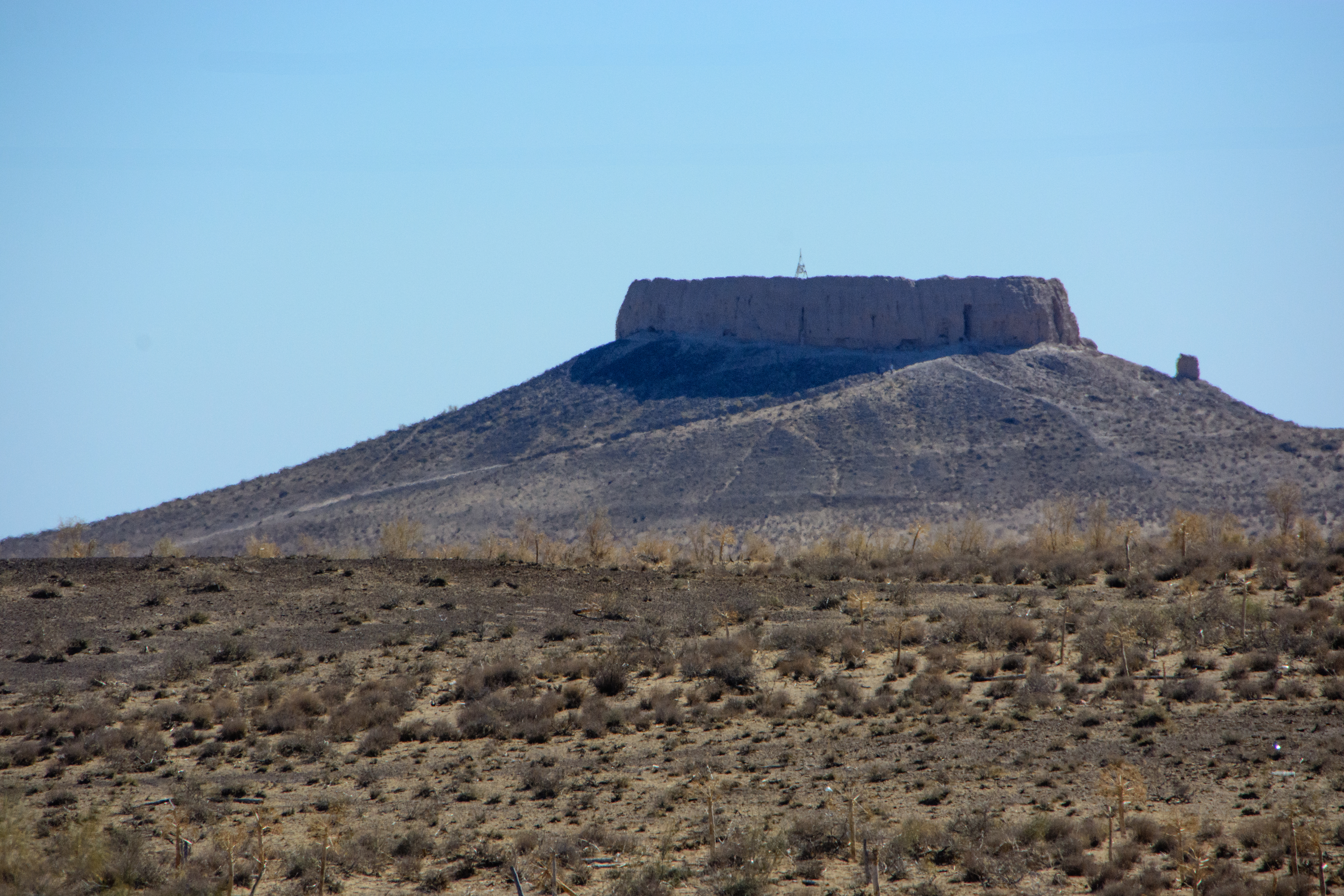
Chilpyk Zoroastrian Tower of Silence (Dakhma), 1st century BCE – 1st century AD

For most of its history, up until the Mongol conquest, the inhabitants of the area were from Iranian stock, and they spoke an Eastern Iranian language called Khwarezmian. The scientist Al-Biruni, a Khwarazm native, in his Athar ul-Baqiyah, specifically verifies the Iranian origins of Khwarezmians when he wrote (in Arabic):

أهل خوارزم [...] کانوا غصناً من دوحة الفرس
("The people of Khwarezm were a branch from the Persian tree.")

The area of Khwarazm was under Afrighid and then Samanid control until the 10th century before it was conquered by the Ghaznavids. The Iranian Khwarezmian language and culture felt the pressure of Turkic infiltration from northern Khwarazm southwards, leading to the disappearance of the original Iranian character of the province and its complete Turkicization today. Khwarezmian speech probably lasted in upper Khwarazm, the region around Hazarasp, till the end of the 8th/14th century.

The Khwarezmian language survived for several centuries after Islam until the Turkification of the region, and so must some at least of the culture and lore of ancient Khwarazm, for it is hard to see the commanding figure of Al-Biruni, a repository of so much knowledge, appearing in a cultural vacuum.

=== Achaemenid period ===
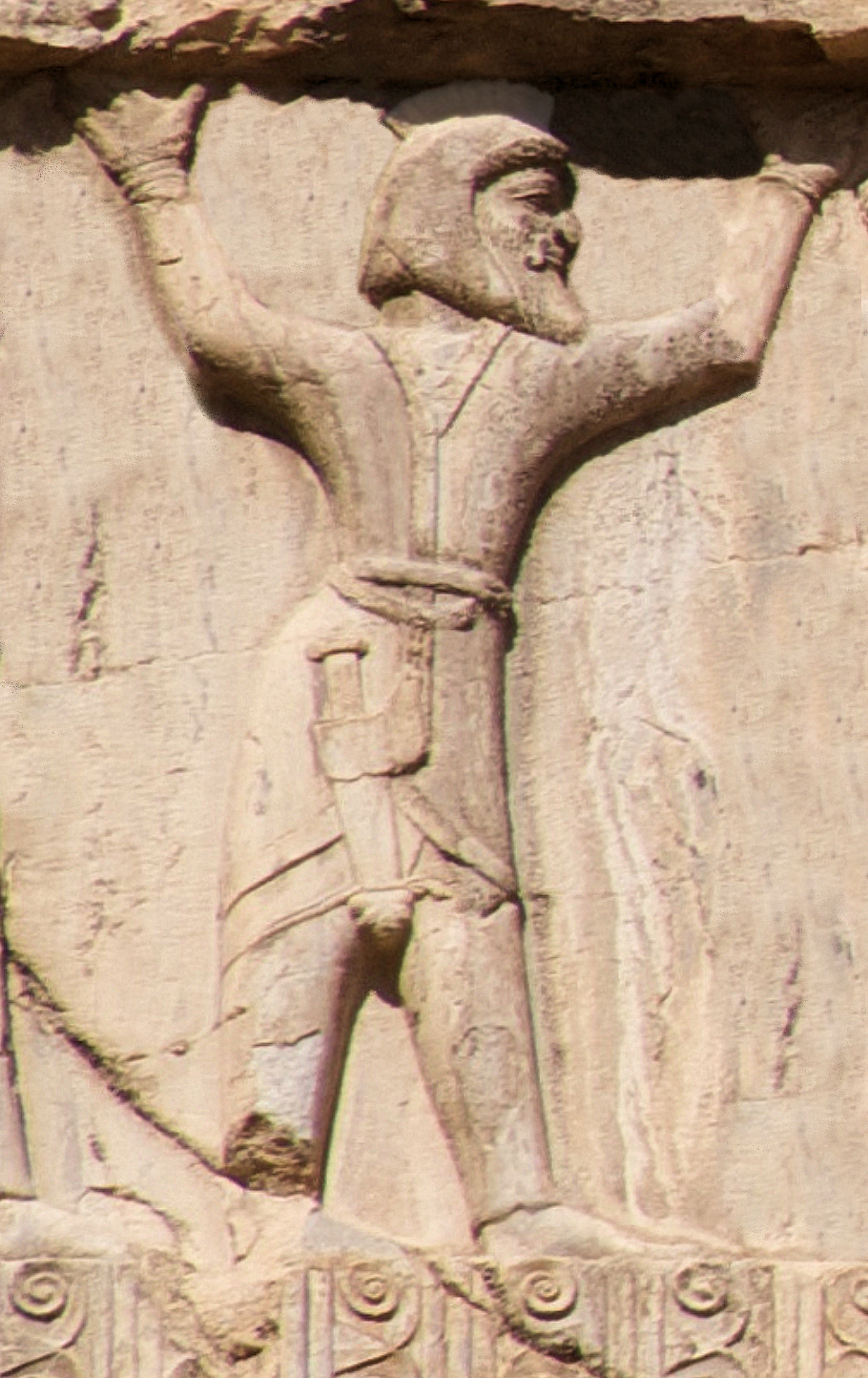
Xerxes I tomb, Choresmian soldier circa 470 BCE.

The Achaemenid Empire took control of Chorasmia during the time of King Darius I (ruled 522–486 BCE). And the Persian poet Ferdowsi mentions Persian cities like Afrasiab and Chach in abundance in his epic Shahnama. The contact with the Achaemenid Empire had a great influence on the material culture of Chorasmia, starting a period of rich economic and cultural development.

Chorasmian troops participated in the Second Persian invasion of Greece by Xerxes in t80 BCE, under the command of Achaemenid general and later satrap Artabazos I of Phrygia. By the time of the Persian king Darius III, Khwarazm had already become an independent kingdom.

=== Hellenistic period ===
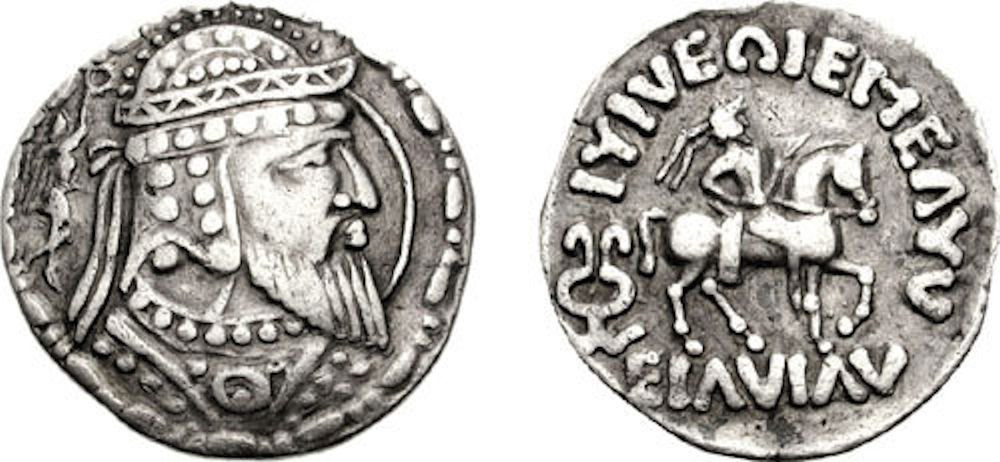
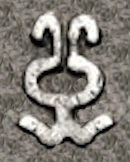
Artav (Artabanos), ruler of Khwarezm. Blundered Greek legend "ΙΥΙΥΕΩΙΕ ΜΕΛΥΙ ΕΙΛΥΙΛΥ". Nike crowning the bust of the ruler. Chorasmian tamgha. Circa 1st–2nd century AD.

Chorasmia was involved in the conquests of Alexander the Great in Central Asia. When the king of Khwarazm offered friendship to Alexander in 328 BCE, Alexander's Greek and Roman biographers imagined the nomad king of a desert waste, but 20th-century Russian archeologists revealed the region as a stable and centralized kingdom, a land of agriculture to the east of the Aral Sea, surrounded by the nomads of Central Asia, protected by its army of mailed horsemen, in the most powerful kingdom northwest of the Amu Darya (the Oxus River of antiquity). The king's emissary offered to lead Alexander's armies against his own enemies, west over the Caspian towards the Black Sea (e.g. Kingdom of Iberia and Colchis).

Khwarazm was largely independent during the Seleucid, Greco-Bactrian and Arsacid dynasties. Numerous fortresses were built, and the Khwarazm oasis has been dubbed the "Fifty fortresses oasis". Chorasmia remained relatively sheltered from the interests of the Seleucid Empire or Greco-Bactria, but various elements of Hellenistic art appear in the ruins of Chorasmian cities, particularly at Akchakhan-Kala, and the influence of the Greco-Buddhist art of Gandhara, reflecting the rise of Kushan Empire, appears at Toprak-Kala. The early rulers of Chorasmia first imitated the coinage of the Greco-Bactrian ruler Eucratides I. Parthian artistic influences have also been described.

From the 1st century BCE, Chorasmia developed original coins inspired frbyreco-Bactrian, Parthian, and Indo-Scythian types. Artav (Artabanus), a Chorasmian ruler of the 1st–2nd century, whose coins were discovered in the capital city of Toprak-Kala, imitated the type of the Kushan Heraios and was found together with coins of the Kushan rulers Vima Kadphises and Kanishka.

From the 2nd century CE, Chorasmia became part of the vast cultural sphere corresponding to the rise of the Kushan Empire in the east.

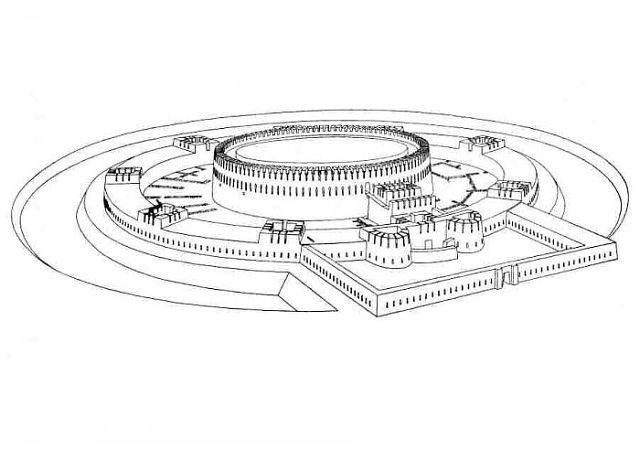
Koi Krylgan Kala fortress (4th–3rd century BCE)

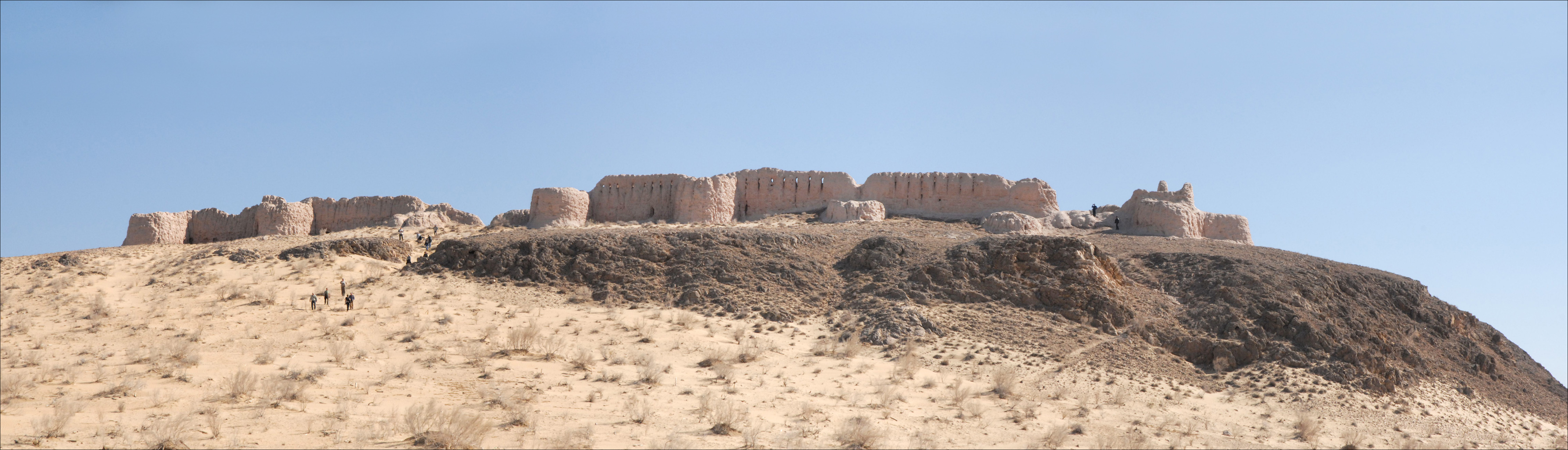
Ayaz Kala 1 fortress (4th-3rd century BCE)

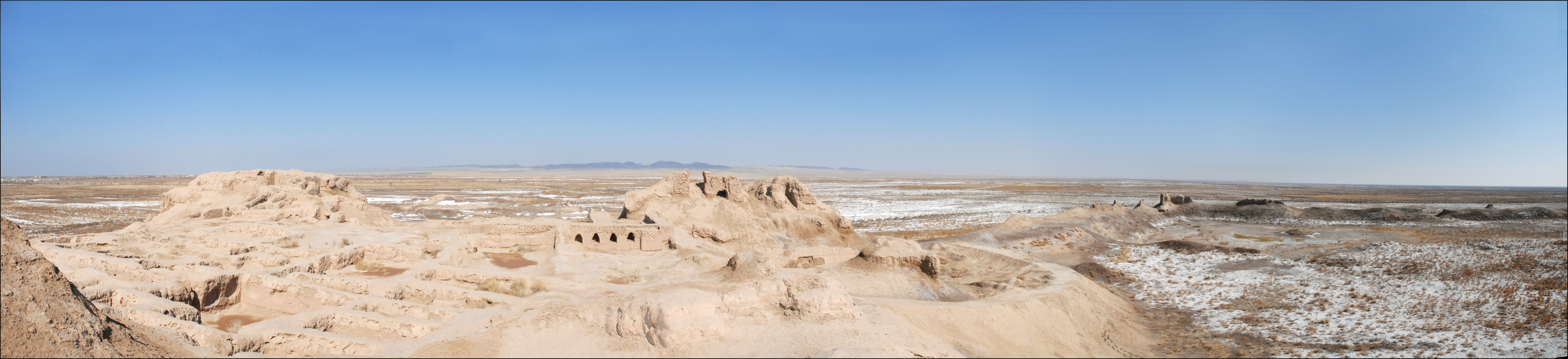
Toprak-Kala palace city (1st–2nd century CE)

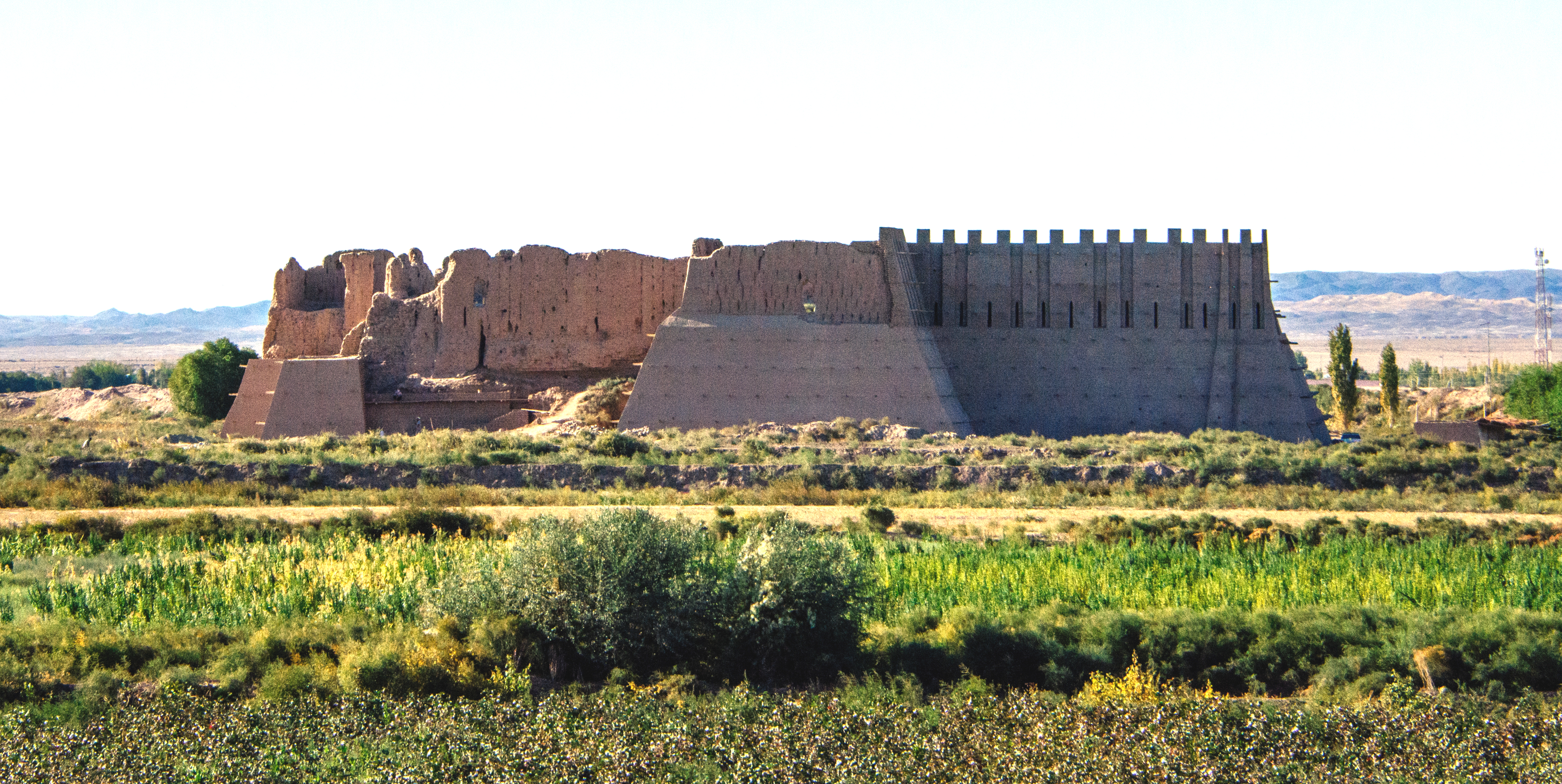
Fortress of Kyzyl-Kala, partially restored (1st–4th century CE)

=== Sassanid period ===
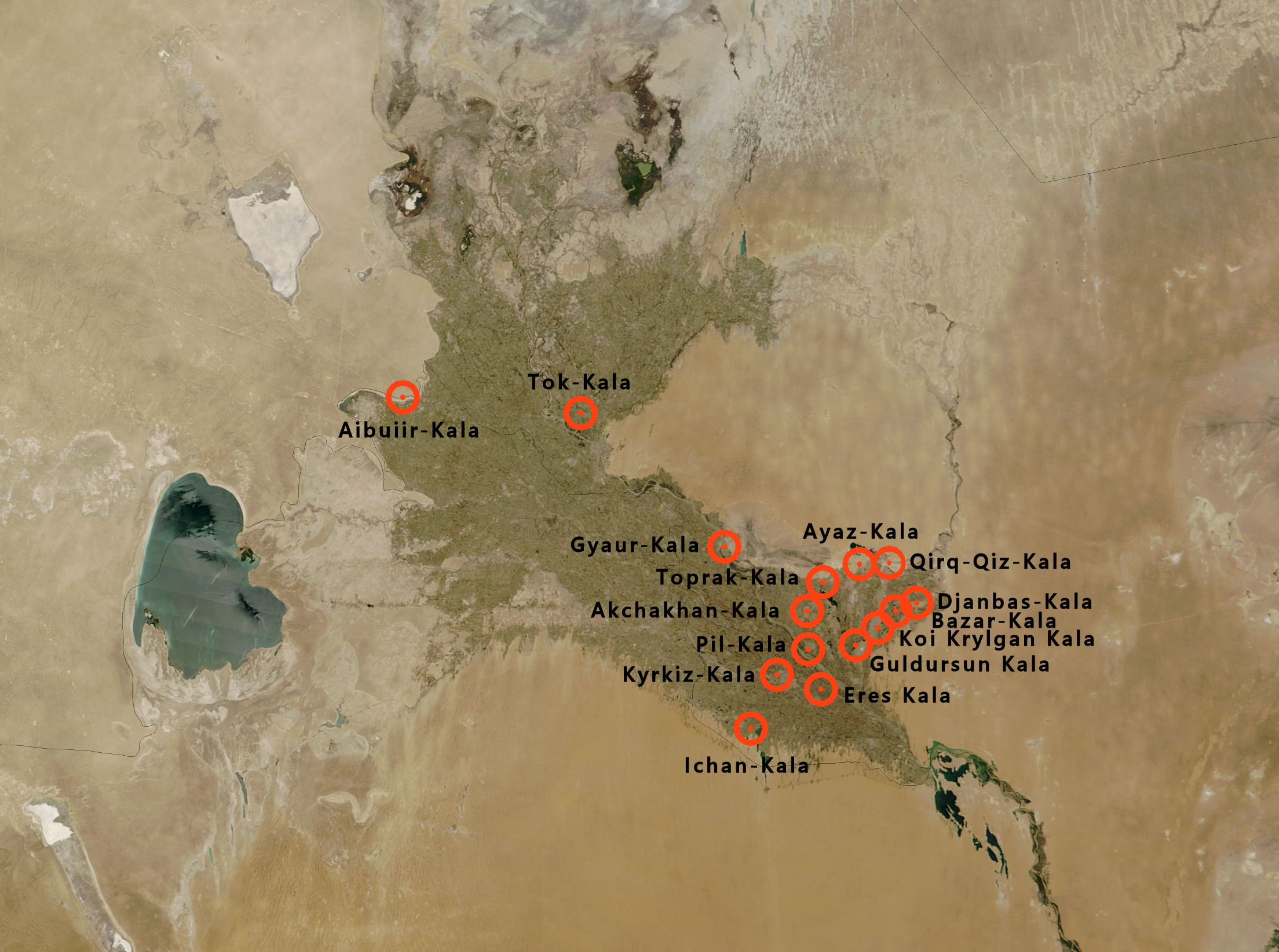
Location of the main fortresses of the Chorasmian oasis, 4th century BCE-6th century AD

Under Shapur I, the Sasanian Empire spread as far as Khwarazm. Yaqut al-Hamawi verifies that Khwarazm was a regional capital of the Sassanid empire. When speaking of the pre-Islamic "Khusraw of Khwarazm" (خسرو خوارزم), the Islamic "Emir of Khwarazm" (امیر خوارزم), or even the Khwarazmid Empire, sources such as Al-Biruni and Ibn Khordadbeh and others clearly refer to Khwarazm as being part of the Iranian (Persian) empire. During the reign of Khosrow II, extensive areas of Khwarazm were conquered.

The fact that Pahlavi script, which was used by the Persian bureaucracy alongside Old Persian, passed into use in Khwarazmia where it served as the first local alphabet about the 2nd century CE, as well as evidence that Khwarazm-Shahs such as ʿAlā al-Dīn Tekish (1172–1200) issued all their orders (both administrative and public) in the Persian language, corroborates Al-Biruni's claims. It was also a vassal kingdom during periods of Kushans, Hephthalites and Gokturks power before the coming of the Arabs.

=== Afrighids ===
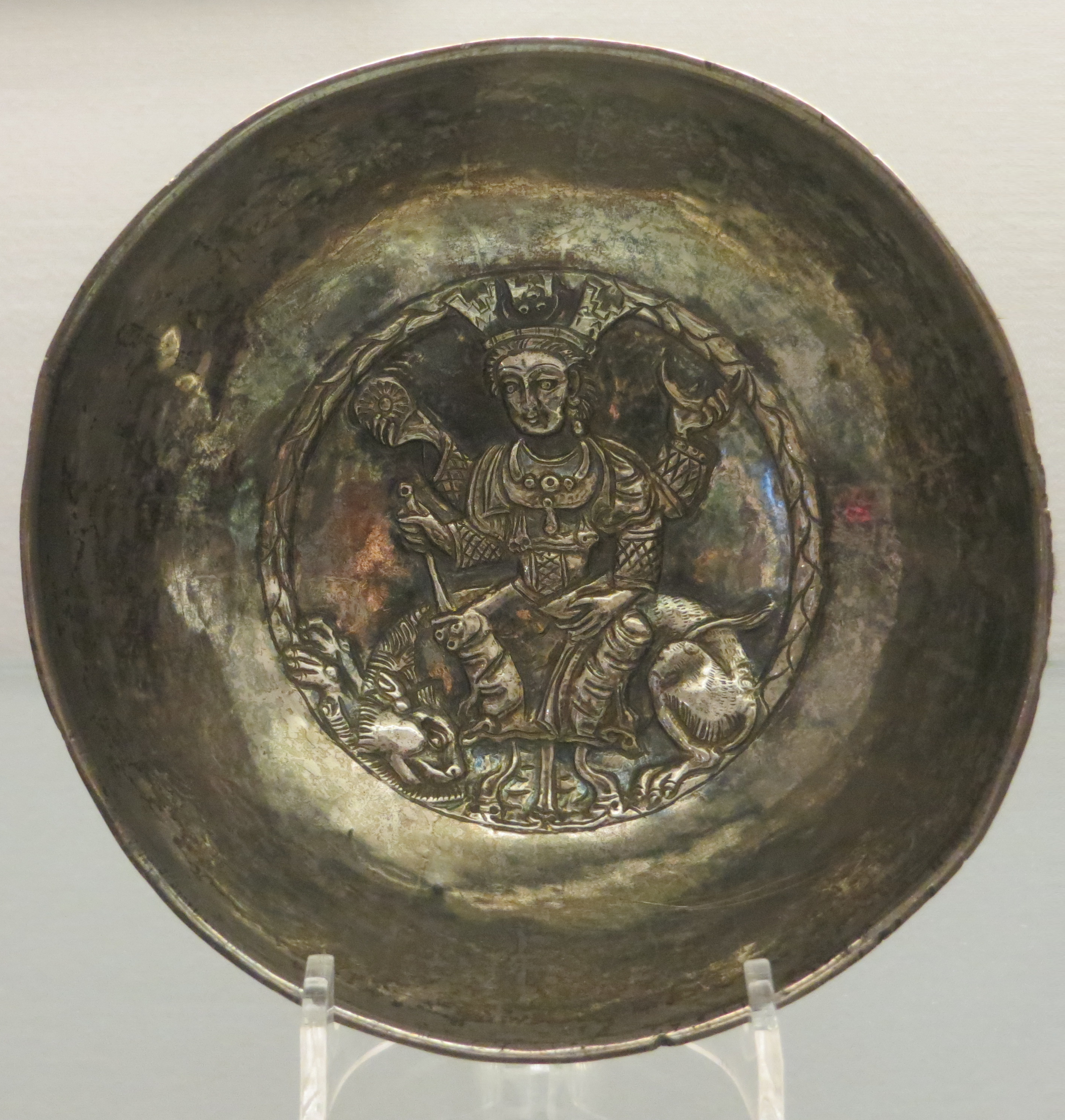
Silver bowl from Khwarazm depicting a four-armed goddess seated on a lion, possibly Nana. Dated 658 AD, British Museum. The bowl is similar to that of the Sassanians, who had been ruling the region since the early 200s. It displays a fusion of Roman-Hellenistic, Indian and Persian cultural influences.

Per Al-Biruni, the Afrighids of Kath (آفریغیان آل آفریغ) were a native Khwarezmian Iranian dynasty which ruled as the Shahs of Khwarazm from 305 to 995 AD. At times they were under Sassanian suzerainty.

In 712, Khwarazm was conquered by the Arab Caliphate (Umayyads and Abbasids). It thus came vaguely under Muslim control, but it was not till the end of the 8th century and the beginning of the 9th century that an Afrighid Shah first converted to Islam, appearing with the popular convert's name of ʿAbdullah ('slave of God'). In the course of the 10th century—when some geographers such as Istakhri in his Al-Masalik wa-l-mamalik mention Khwarazm as part of Khorasan and Transoxiania—the local Ma'munids, based in Gurganj on the left bank of the Amu Darya, grew in economic and political importance due to trade caravans. In 995, they violently overthrew the Afrighids and themselves assumed the traditional title of Khwarazm-Shah.

Briefly, the area was under Samanid suzerainty before it passed to Mahmud of Ghazni in 1017. From then on, Turko-Mongolian invasions and long rule by Turko-Mongol dynasties supplanted the Iranian character of the region although the title of Khwarazm-Shah was maintained well up to the 13th century.

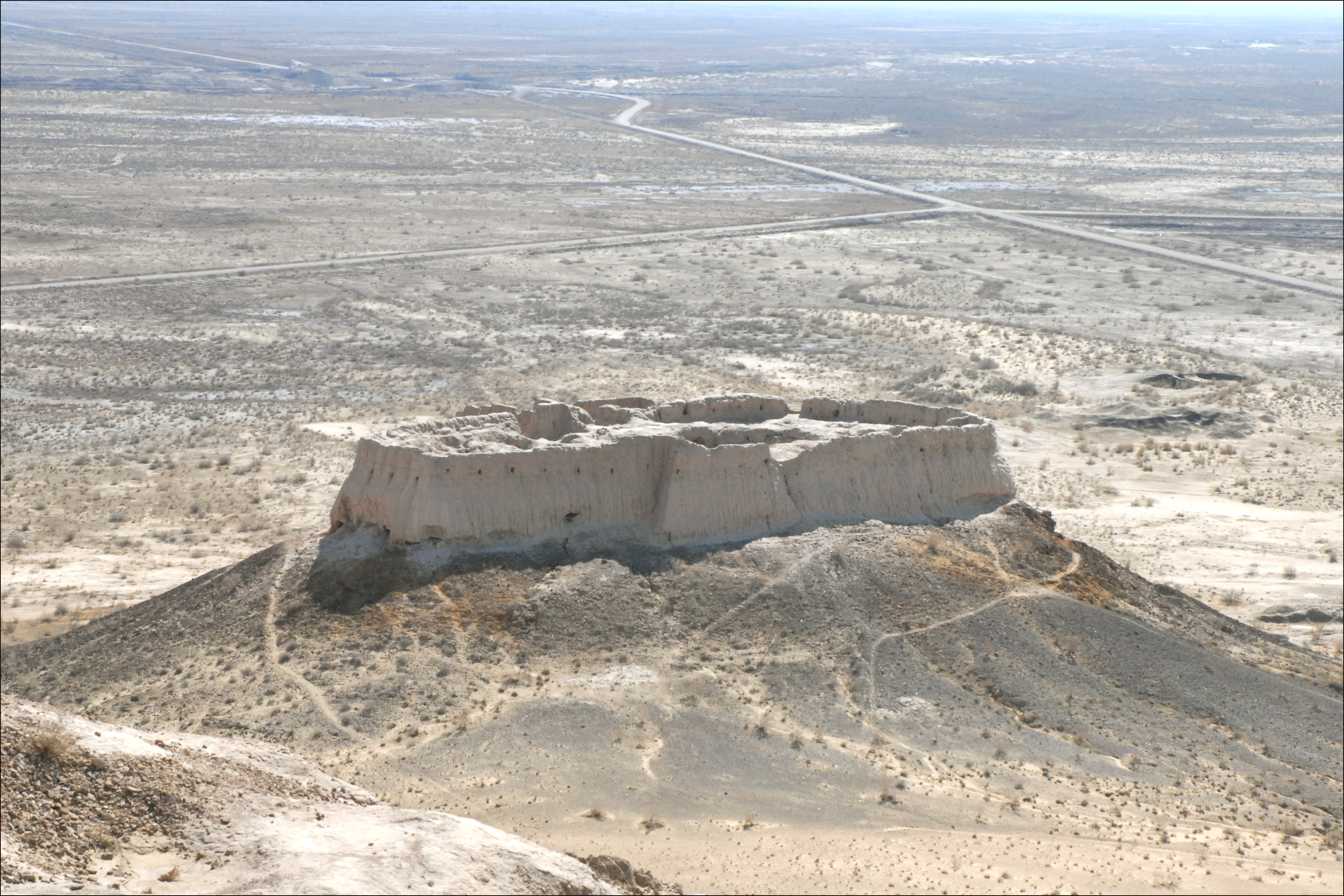
Ayaz Kala 2 fortress (6th to 8th century AD)

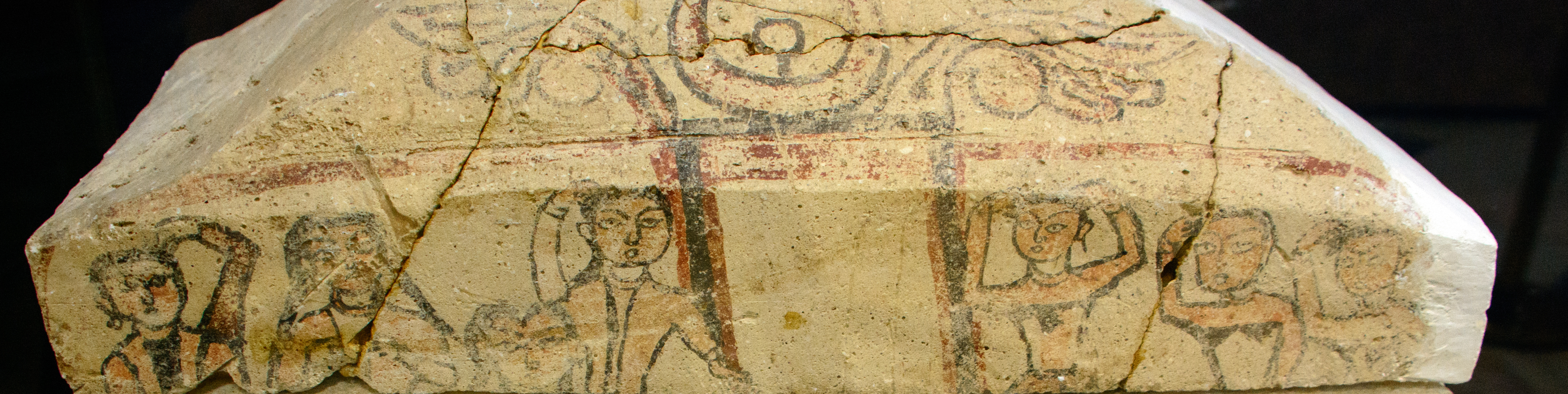
Ossuary Lid, Tok-Kala Necropolis, Alabaster. 7th-8th century AD

=== Khwarazmian Empire ===
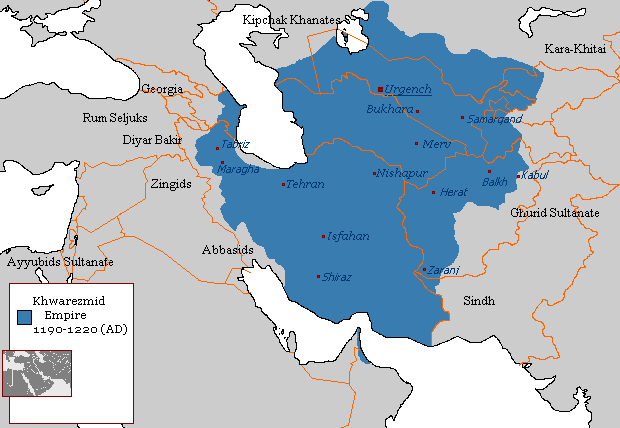
Khwarazmian Empire

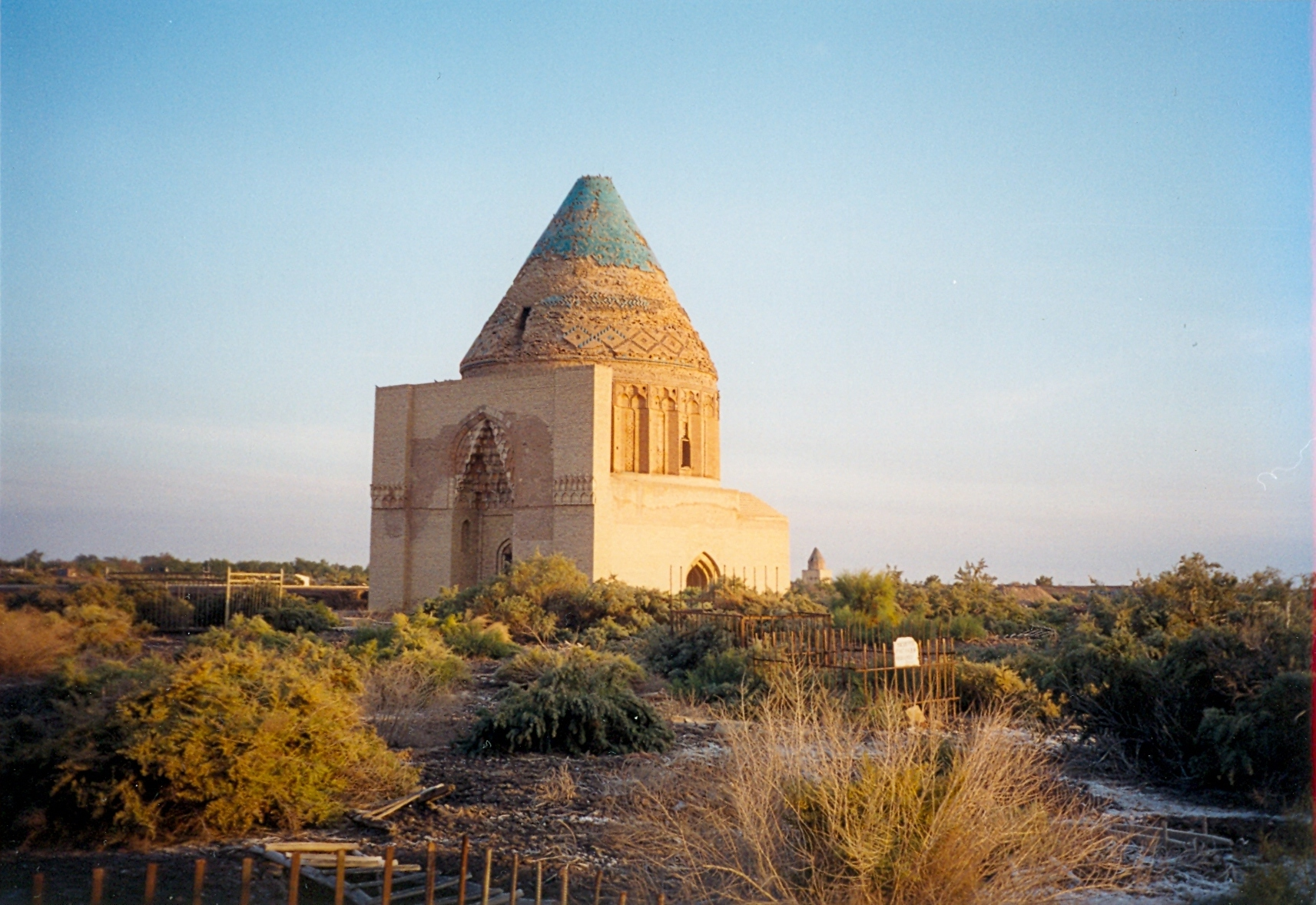
Takash mausoleum in Konye-Urgench, Turkmenistan

The date of the founding of the Khwarazmian dynasty remains debatable. During a revolt in 1017, Khwarezmian rebels murdered Abu'l-Abbas Ma'mun and his wife, Hurra-ji, sister of the Ghaznavid sultan Mahmud. In response, Mahmud invaded and occupied the region of Khwarazm, which included Nasa and the ribat of Farawa. As a result, Khwarazm became a province of the Ghaznavid Empire from 1017 to 1034. In 1077, the governorship of the province, which since 1042/1043 belonged to the Seljuqs, fell into the hands of Anushtegin Gharchai, a former Turkic slave of the Seljuq sultan. In 1141, the Seljuq Sultan Ahmed Sanjar was defeated by the Qara Khitai at the battle of Qatwan, and Anush Tigin's grandson Ala ad-Din Atsiz became a vassal to Yelü Dashi of the Qara Khitai.

Sultan Ahmed Sanjar died in 1156. As the Seljuk state fell into chaos, the Khwarazm-Shahs expanded their territories southward. In 1194, the last Sultan of the Great Seljuq Empire, Toghrul III, was defeated and killed by the Khwarazm ruler Ala ad-Din Tekish, who conquered parts of Khorasan and western Iran. In 1200, Tekish died and was succeeded by his son, Ala ad-Din Muhammad, who initiated a conflict with the Ghurids and was defeated by them at Amu Darya (1204). Following the sack of Khwarizm, Muhammad appealed for aid from his suzerain, the Qara Khitai, ai who sent him an army. With this reinforcement, Muhammad won a victory over the Ghorids at Hezarasp (1204) and forced them out of Khwarizm.

=== Mongol conquest by Genghis Khan ===
The Khwarazmian Empire ruled over all of Persia in the early 13th century under Shah ʿAlāʾ al-Dīn Muhammad II (1200–1220). From 1218 to 1220, Genghis Khan conquered Central Asia including the Kara-Khitai Khanate, thus ending the Khwarazmian Empire. Sultan Muhammad died after retreating from the Mongols near the Caspian Sea, while his son Jalal ad-Din, after being defeated by Genghis Khan at the Battle of Indus, sought refuge with the Delhi Sultanate, and was later assassinated after various attempts to defeat the Mongols and the Seljuks.

=== Khwarazm during the rule of Qunghrat dynasty (1360–1388) ===
In 1360 there arose in Khwarazm an independent minor dynasty of Qunghrat Turks, the Ṣūfīs, but Solaymān Ṣūfī was crushed by Timur in 1388.

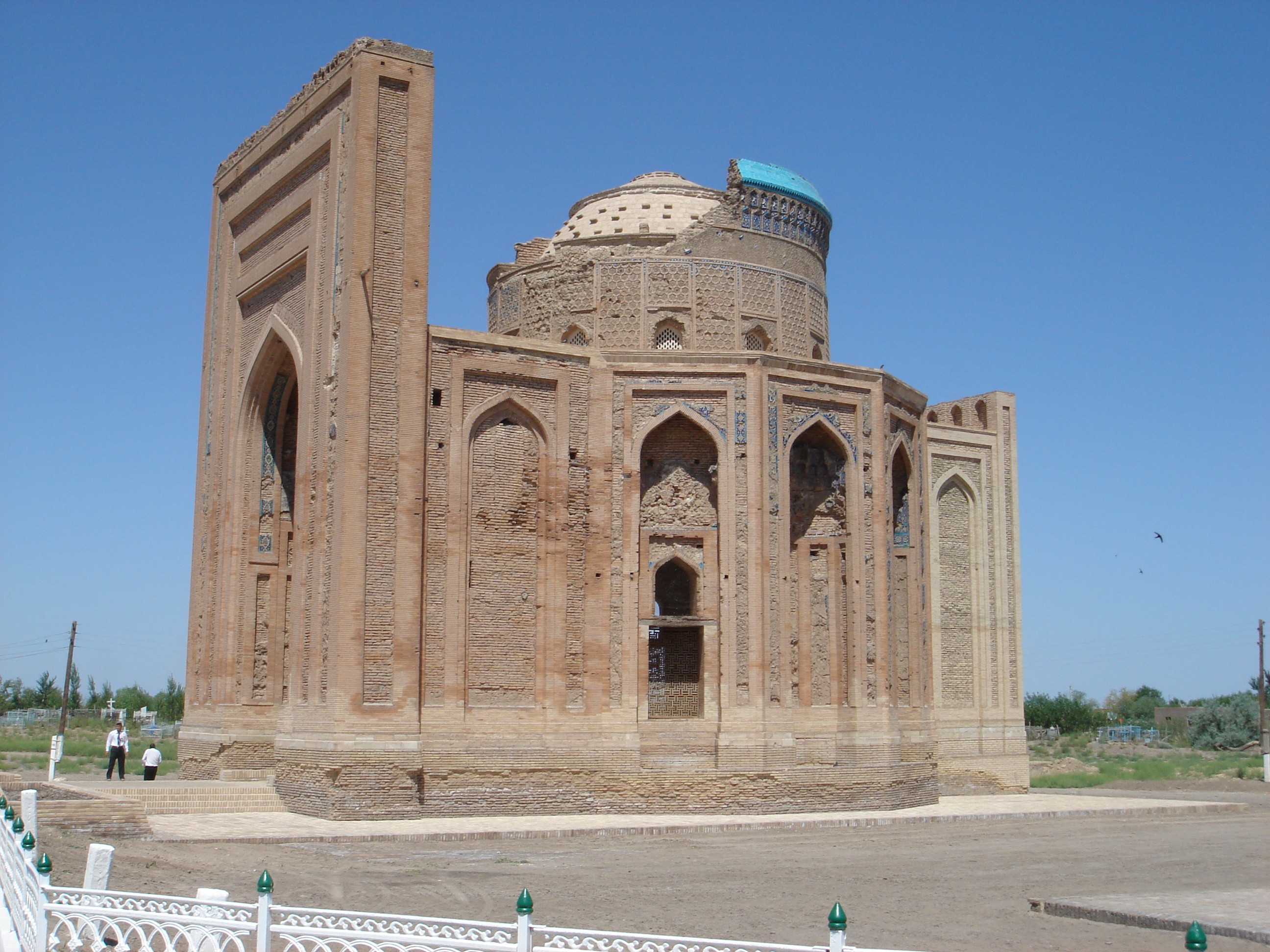
Turabek khanum mausoleum in Kunya Urgench, Qunghrat dynasty, 1330, Turkmenistan

The Islamization of Khwarazm was reflected in the creation of literary, scientific and religious works and in the translation of Arabic works into the Turkic language. In the Suleymaniye Library in Istanbul, the Koran is kept with an interlinear translation into Turkic, written in Khwarazm and dated (January – February 1363).

The region of Khwarazm was split between the White Horde and Jagatai Khanate, and its rebuilt capital Gurganj (modern Kunya Urgench, "Old Gorganj" as opposed to the modern city of Urgench some distance away) again became one of the largest and most important trading centers in Central Asia. In the mid-14th century K, Khwarazm gained independence from the Golden Horde under the Sufid dynasty. However, Timur regarded Khwarazm as a rival to Samarkand, and over the course of five campaigns, destroyed Urganch in 1388.

=== Khwarazm during the reign of the Ibanids – Arabshahids ===
Control of the region was disputed by the Timurids and the Golden Horde, but in 1511 it passed to a new, local Uzbek dynasty, the ʿArabshahids.

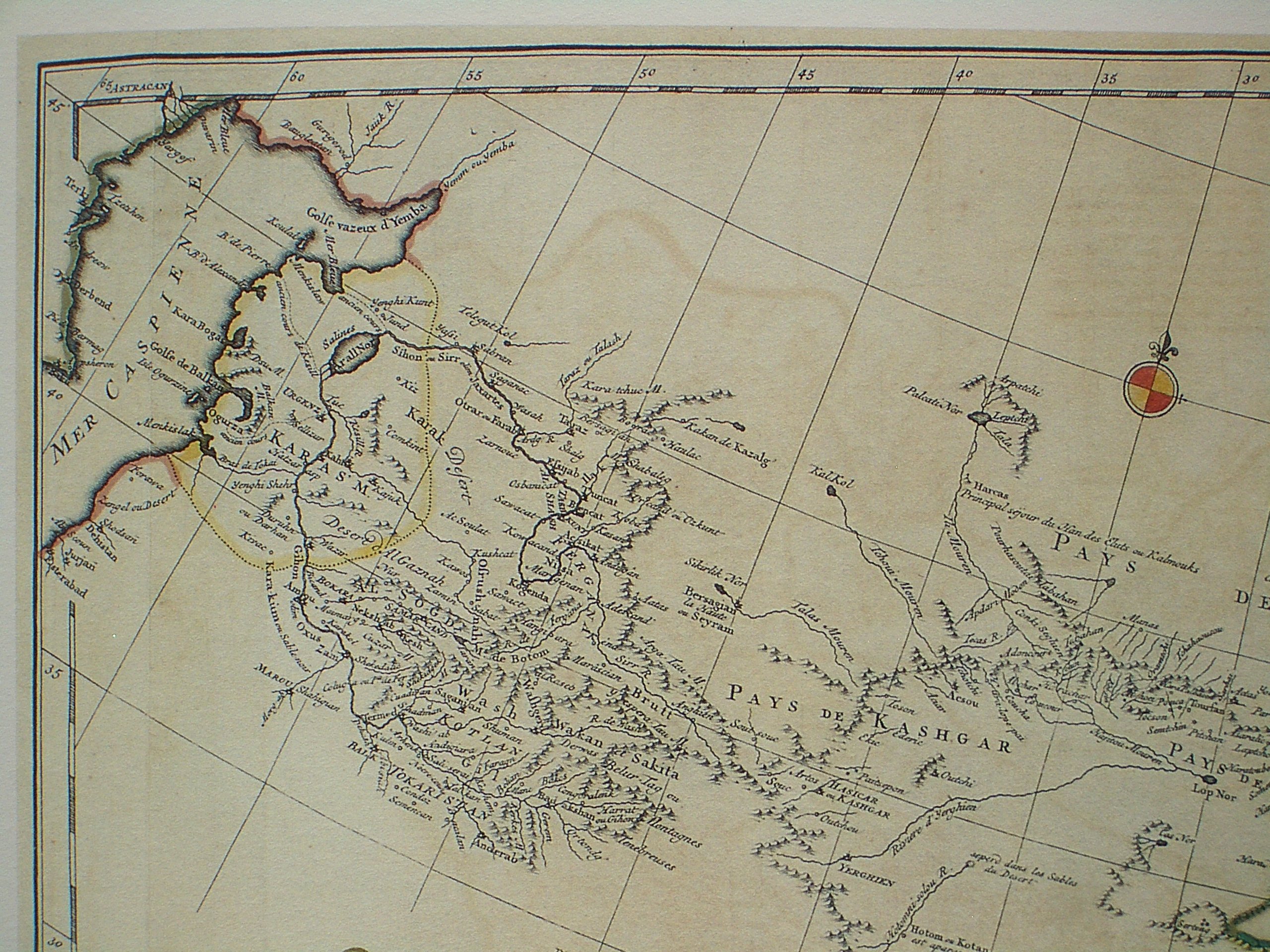
Khwarazm (Karasm), on a 1734 French map. The Khanate on the map surrounds the Aral Sea (depicted as much smaller than it actually was in those days) and includes much of the Caspian Sea coast of today's Kazakhstan and Turkmenistan

This, together with a shift in the course of the Amu-Darya, caused the center of Khwarazm to shift to Khiva, which became in the 16th century the capital of the Khanate of Khiva, ruled over by the dynasty of the Arabshahids.

Khiva Khanate is the name of Khwarazm adopted in the Russian historical tradition during the period of its existence (1512–1920). The Khiva Khanate was one of the Uzbek khanates. The term "Khiva Khanate" was used for the state in Khwarazm that existed from the beginning of the 16th century until 1920. The term "Khiva Khanate" was not used by the locals, who used the name Khwarazm. In Russian sources, the term Khiva Khanate began to be used from the 18th century.

The rumors of gold on the banks of the Amu Darya during the reign of Russia's Peter the Great, together with the desire of the Russian Empire to open a trade route to the Indus (modern day Pakistan), prompted an armed trade expedition to the region, led by Prince Alexander Bekovich-Cherkassky, which was repelled by Khiva.

=== Khwarazm during the reign of the Uzbek dynasty of Qungrats ===
During the reign of the Uzbek Khan Said Muhammad Khan (1856–1864) in the 1850s, for the first time in the history of Khwarazm, a general population census of Khwarazm was carried out.

=== Khwarazm in 1873–1920 ===
It was under Tsars Alexander II and Alexander III that serious efforts to annex the region started. One of the main pretexts for Russian military expeditions to Khiva was to free Russian slaves in the khanate and to prevent future slave capture and trade.

Early in The Great Game, Russian interests in the region collided with those of the British Empire in the First Anglo-Afghan War in 1839.

The Khanate of Khiva was gradually reduced in size from Russian expansion in Turkestan (including Khwarazm) and, in 1873, a peace treaty was signed that established Khiva as a quasi-independent Russian protectorate.

In 1912, the Khiva Khanate numbered up to 440 schools and up to 65 madrasahs with 22,500 students. More than half of the madrasahs were in the city of Khiva (38).

=== Soviet period ===
After the Bolshevik seizure of power in the October Revolution, a short-lived Khorezm People's Soviet Republic (later the Khorezm SSR) was created out of the territory of the old Khanate of Khiva, before in 1924 it was finally incorporated into the Soviet Union, with the former Khanate divided between the new Turkmen SSR, Uzbek SSR and Karakalpakstan ASSR (initially part of Kazakh ASSR as Karakalpak Oblast).

The larger historical area of Khwarazm is further divided. Northern Khwarazm became the Uzbek SSR, and in 1925 the western part became the Turkmen SSR. Also, in 1936 the northwestern part became part of the Kazakh SSR. Following the collapse of the Soviet Union in 1991, these became Uzbekistan, Turkmenistan and Kazakhstan respectively. Many of the ancient Khwarazmian towns now lie in Xorazm Region, Uzbekistan.

Today, the area that was Khwarazm has a mixed population of Uzbeks, Karakalpaks, Turkmens, Tajiks, Tatars, and Kazakhs.

== In Persian literature ==
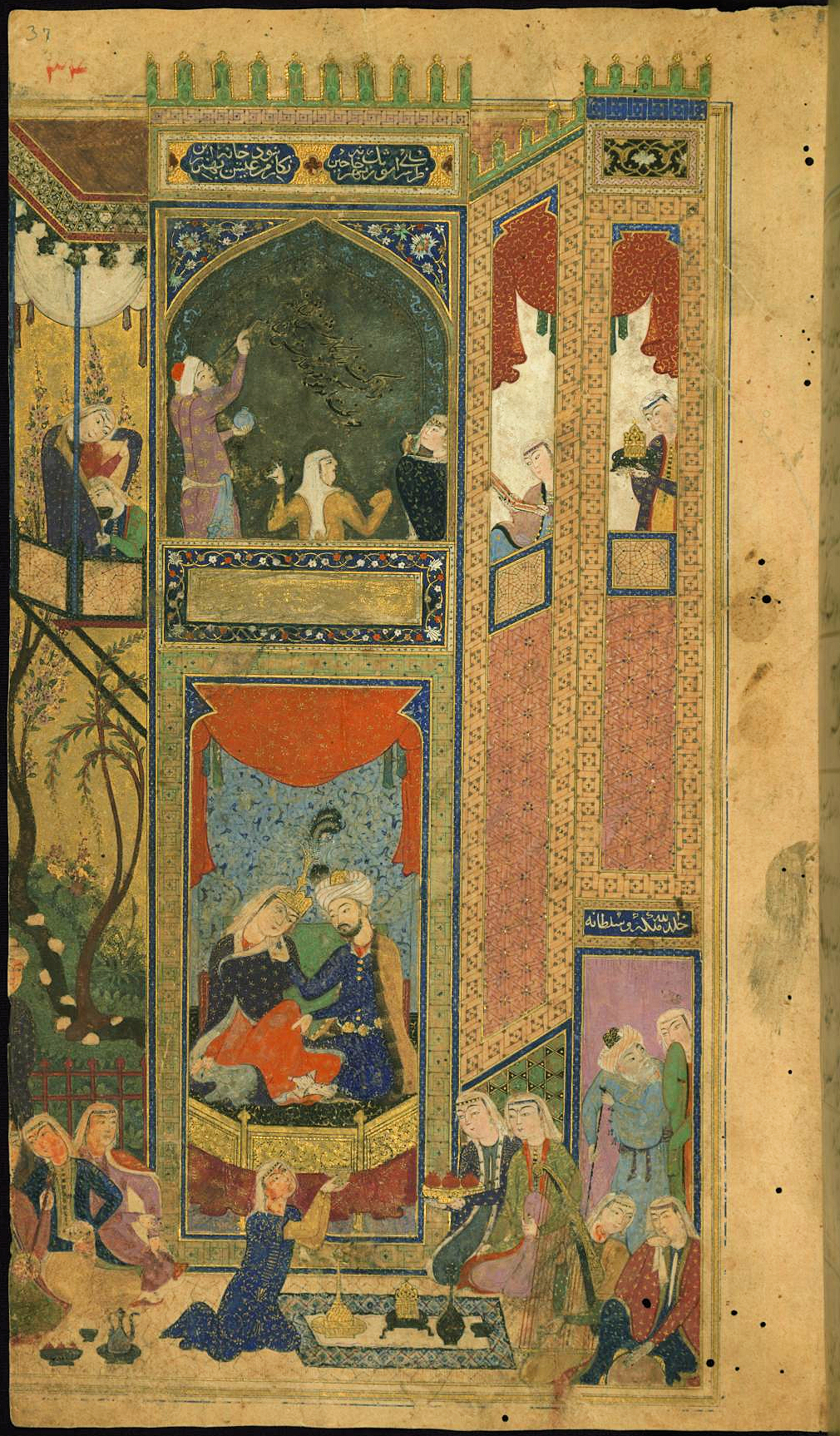
Emir Timur and his maiden from Khwarazm.

Khwarazm and her cities appear in Persian literature in abundance, in both prose and poetry. Dehkhoda for example defines the name Bukhara itself as "full of knowledge", referring to the fact that in antiquity, Bukhara was a scientific and scholarly powerhouse. Rumi verifies this when he praises the city as such.

Other examples illustrate the eminent status of Khwarazmian and Transoxianian cities in Persian literature in the past 1500 years:

عالم جانها بر او هست مقرر چنانک
The world of hearts is under his power in the same manner that
دولت خوارزمشاه داد جهان را قرار
The Khwarazmshahs have brought peace to the world.

—Khaqani Shirvani

یکی پر طمع پیش خوارزمشاه
A greedy one went to the Khwarazmshah
شنیدم که شد بامدادی پگاه
early one morning, so I have heard.

—Saadi

Yaqut al-Hamawi, who visited Khwarazm and its capital in 1219, wrote: "I have never seen a city more wealthy and beautiful than Gurganj". The city, however, was destroyed during several invasions, in particular when the Mongol army broke the dams of the Amu Darya, which flooded the city. He reports that for every Mongol soldier, four inhabitants of Gurganj were killed. Najmeddin Kubra, the great Sufi master, was among the casualties. The Mongol army that devastated Gurganj was estimated to have been near 80,000 soldiers. The verse below refers to an earlier calamity that fell upon the region:

آخر ای خاک خراسان داد یزدانت نجات
Oh land of Khorasan! God has saved you,
از بلای غیرت خاک ره گرگانج و کات
from the disaster that befell the land of Gurganj and Kath.

—Divan of Anvari

== Notable people ==
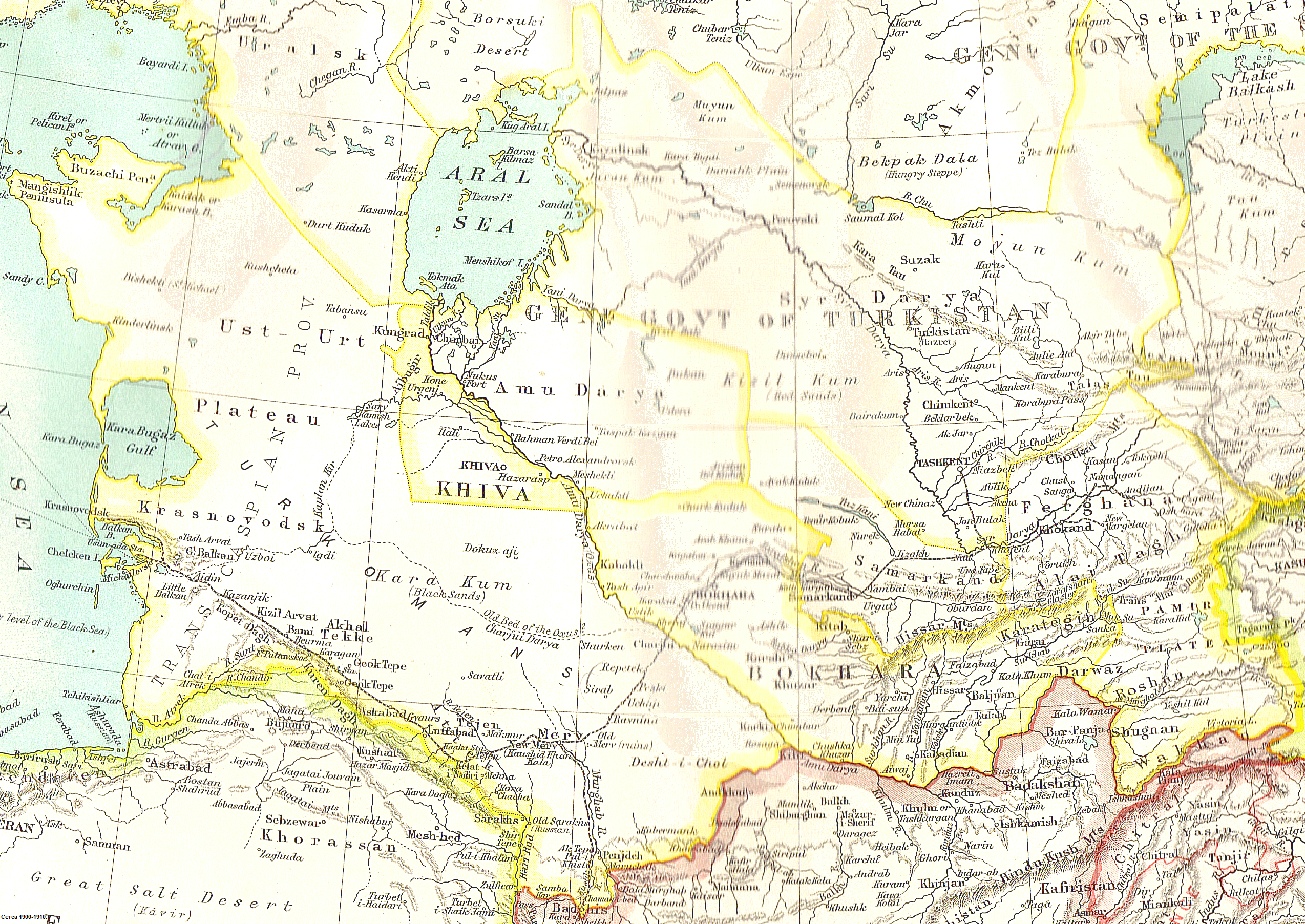
The borders of the Russian imperial territories of Khiva, Bukhara and Kokand in the time period of 1902–1903.

The following either hail from Khwarazm, or lived and are buried there:

- Al-Biruni, outstanding scholar
- Ma'mun II, Khwarazm Shah and founder of an academy
- Najm al-Din Kubra, Sufi mystic
- Rashid al-Din Vatvat, panegyrist and epistolographer
- Fakhr al-Din Razi
- Muhammad al-Khwarizmi, 11th century descendant of Ali al-Uraydi
- Ala al-Din Atsiz, Khwarazm Shah
- Ala al-Din Muhammad, Khwarazm Shah and father of Jalal al-Din Mangburni
- Jalal ad-Din Menguberdi, Khwarazm Shah and maternal uncle of Qutuz
- Qutuz, Grandson of Ala Al-Din Muhammad who later become Mamluk Sultan of Egypt and Syria
- Abaaq al-Khwarazmi
- Muhammad ibn Musa al-Khwarizmi, mathematician (sometimes considered the father of algebra and for whom the term algorithm is named)
- Muhammad ibn Ahmad al-Khwarizmi, 10th century encyclopedist who wrote Mafatih al-'Ulum ("Key to the Sciences")
- Zamakhshari, scholar
- Qutb al-zaman Muhammad ibn Abu-Tahir Marvazi, philosopher
- Al-Marwazi, astronomer
- Mahmud Yalavach, ambassador and governor of Mavaraunnahr (1224–1238)
- Abu l-Ghazi Bahadur, Khan and historian

== See also ==
- Eurasian Avars, alliance of Eurasian nomads (6th–9th century CE)
- Karakalpakstan, autonomous republic within Uzbekistan
- Keraites, 12th-century Turco-Mongol tribal confederation
- Khorezm People's Soviet Republic (1920–1923/25)
- Khwarezmian language, extinct East Iranian language
- Koi Krylgan Kala, archaeological site; Khwarezmian settlement (c. 400 BCE – c. 400 CE)
- The Mongol Invasion (trilogy)
- Mount Imeon, Hellenistic name for Hindu Kush, Pamir and Tian Shan mountains
- Uar, tribal confederation linked to the Huns (5th–8th century CE)
- Zoroaster (c. 1500 – c. 1000 BCE, ancient Iranian prophet
- Zoroastrianism, ancient Iranian religion, still practised

=== Crusader-related ===
- Battle of La Forbie (1244), with decisive Khwarezmian participation; ends Crusader power in Levant
- Siege of Jerusalem (1244) by Khwarezmian tribes

== Sources ==
- Yuri Bregel. "The Sarts in the Khanate of Khiva", Journal of Asian History, Volume 12, 1978, pages 121–151
- Robin Lane Fox. Alexander the Great, pp. 308ff etc.
- Minardi, M. (2015). Ancient Chorasmia. A Polity between the Semi-Nomadic and Sedentary Cultural Areas of Central Asia. Cultural Interactions and Local Developments from the Sixth Century BC to the First Century AD. Peeters. ISBN 978-90-429-3138-1.
- Shir Muhammad Mirab Munis & Muhammad Reza Mirab Agahi. Firdaws al-Iqbal: History of Khorezm (Leiden: Brill) 1999, trans & ed. Yuri Bregel
- Pourshariati, Parvaneh (2011). Decline and Fall of the Sasanian Empire: The Sasanian-Parthian Confederacy and the Arab Conquest of Iran. I. B. Tauris.
- Stoneman, Richard (1994). Palmyra and Its Empire: Zenobia's Revolt Against Rome. The University of Michigan Press.
- West, Barbara A. (1 January 2009). Encyclopedia of the Peoples of Asia and Oceania. Infobase Publishing. ISBN 978-1-4381-1913-7.
