= Toprak-Kala =

Archaeological site in Uzbekistan

- Toprak-Kala
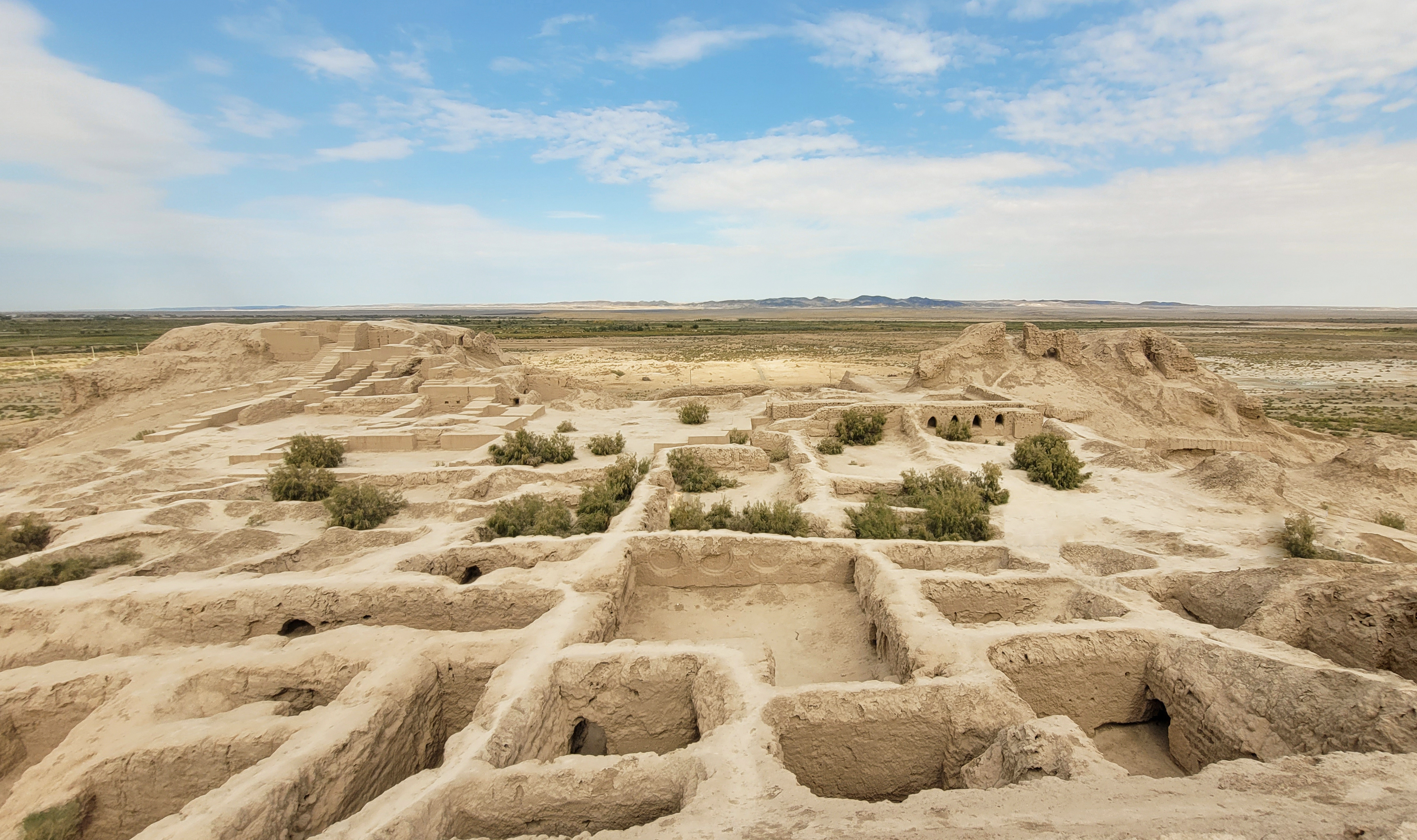
- Ruins of Toprak-Kala

- Location within West and Central Asia Location within Uzbekistan Location within Karakalpakstan
- 41°55′37.9″N 60°49′19.8″E
- Type: Settlement
- Periods: Parthian, Sasanian
- Location: Karakalpakstan, Uzbekistan

Site notes
- Excavation dates: 1938
- Condition: Ruined

Toprak-Kala, in modern Karakalpakstan, Uzbekistan, was an ancient palace city and the capital of Chorasmia in the 2nd/3rd century CE, where wall paintings, coins and archives were discovered. Its history covers a period from the 1st to the 5th century CE. It is part of the "Fifty fortresses oasis" in modern-day Uzbekistan.

== Toprak-Kala palace city ==
Toprak-Kala appears to have been built by Artav (Artabanos), ruler of Khwarezm, in the 1st or 2nd century CE. The establishment of Toprak-Kala probably followed the abandonment of Akchakhan-Kala, 14 km to the southwest.

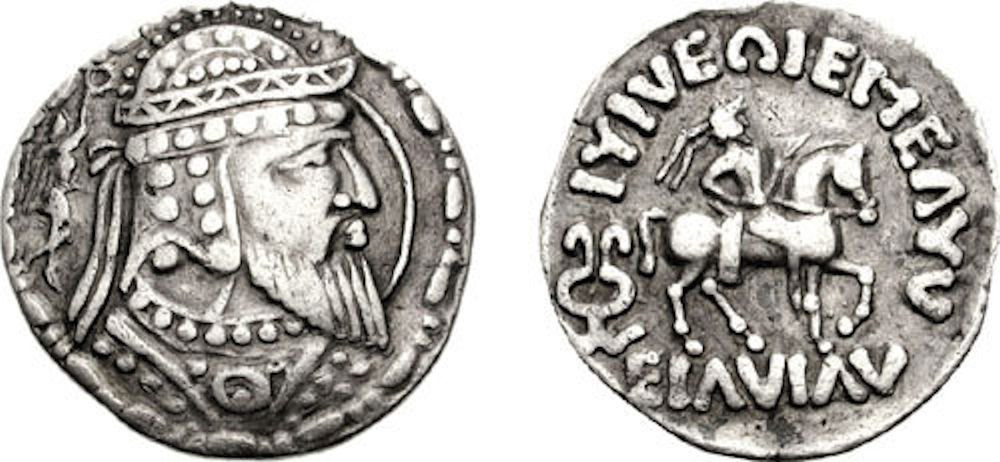
Artav (Artabanos), ruler of Khwarezm and founder of Toprak-Kala. Blundered Greek legend "ΙΥΙΥΕΩΙΕ ΜΕΛΥΙ ΕΙΛΥΙΛΥ". Nike crowning the bust of the ruler. Circa 1st-2nd century CE.

The ruins of the city were explored by the Chorasmian Expedition under the guidance of Sergey Tolstov in 1938. The date of the palace has been determined by the discovery of coins of the Kushan Empire rulers Vima Kadphises and Kanishka, as well as coins of the Khwarazmian king Artav (Artabanus). Wall paintings representing Zoroastrian deities were discovered in the Palace.

Toprak-kala and the whole of Chorasmia seem to have been under the control of the Kushan Empire for some time during the 2nd century CE, as coins of Vima Kadphises and Kanishka were found, interrupting a series of coins of Chorasmian rulers before and after them. Others have analysed the coinage evidence as indicating that the Kushan did not control Khwarezm.

Several high-reliefs of standing figures drapped in robes of Hellenistic style, which are thought to derive from the style of the Greco-Buddhist art of Gandhara, reflecting the influence of the Kushan Empire, were discovered in the ruins of Toprak-Kala. This abundant sculptural work may also have been accomplished by artisans from nearby Bactria, where a Hellenistic tradition remained active since the time of the Greco-Bactrian kingdom. The statues are now located in the Hermitage Museum in Saint-Petersburg.

Sergey Tolstov drew a reconstruction of the ancient city.

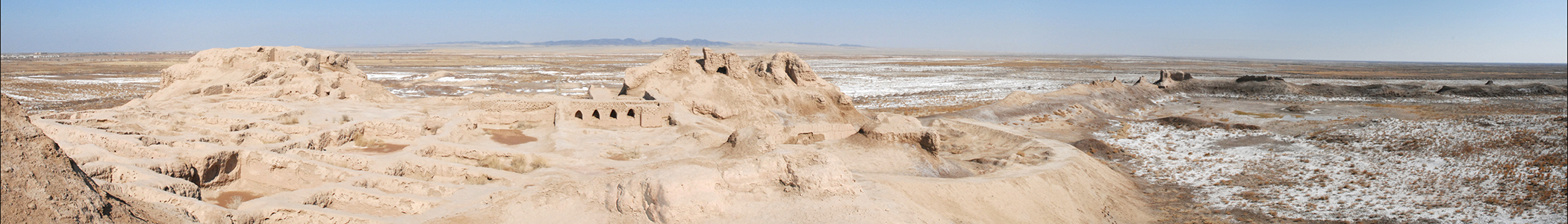
Panorama of the ruins of Toprak-Kala

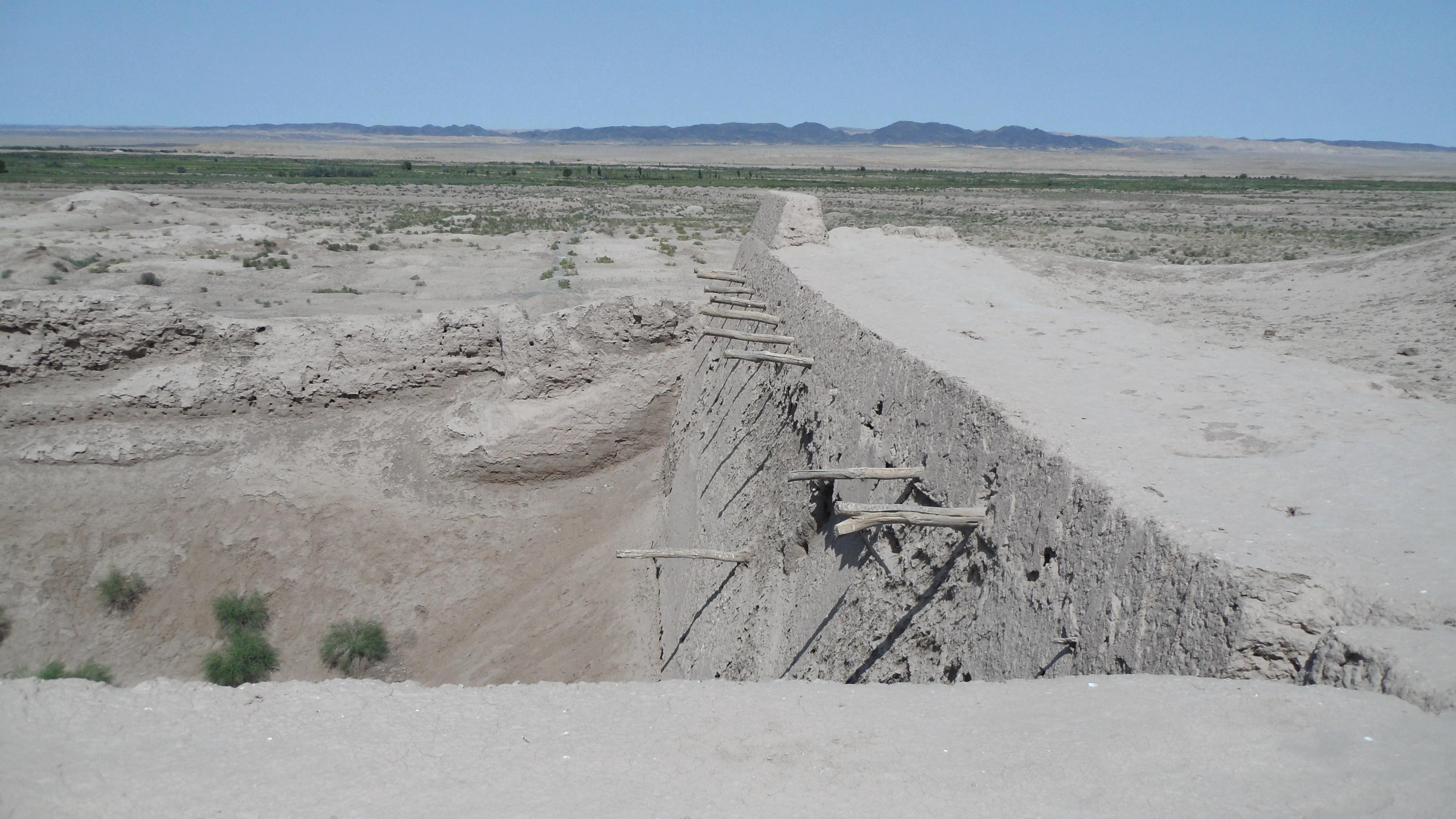
Toprak Kala ruins

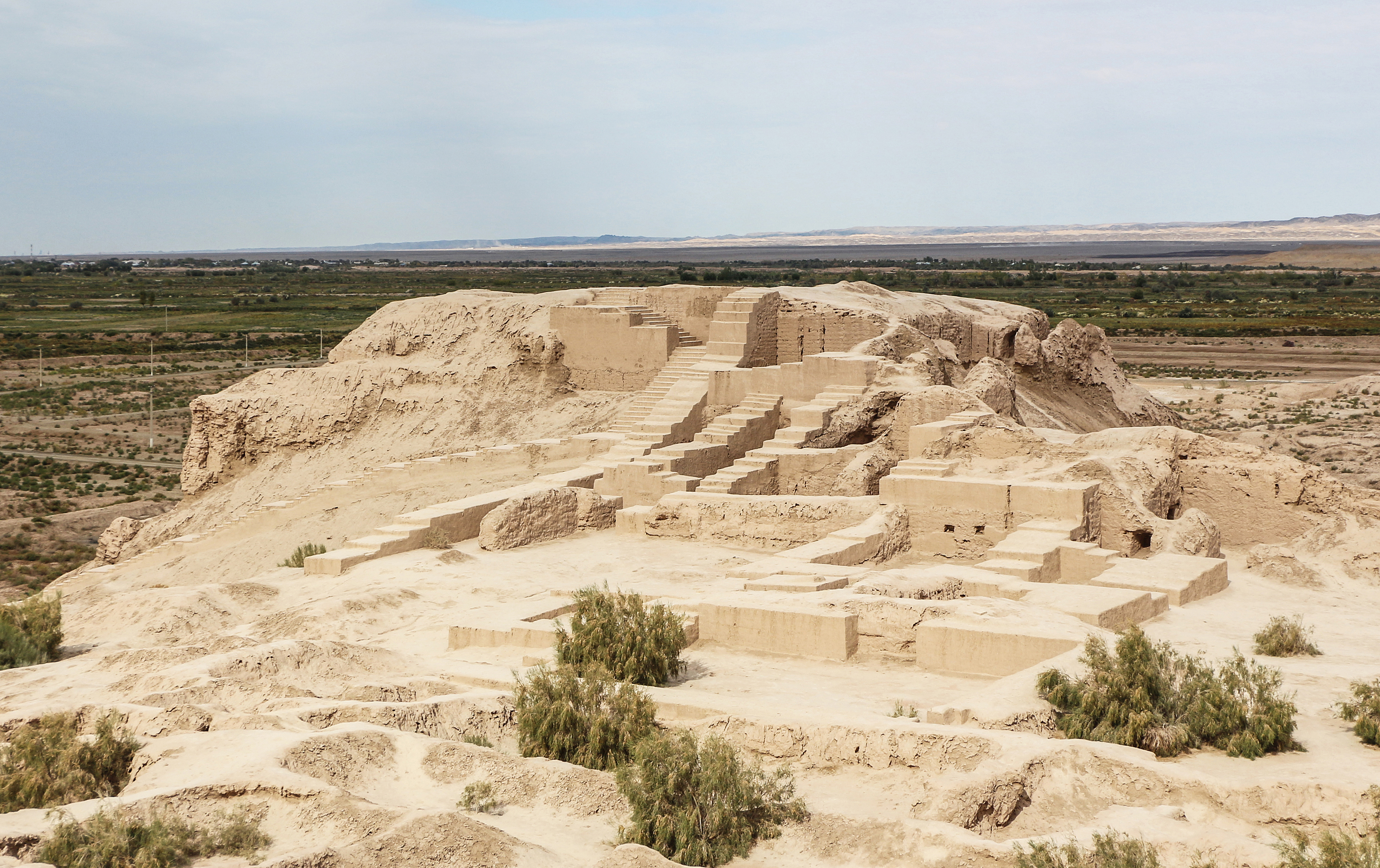
The palace

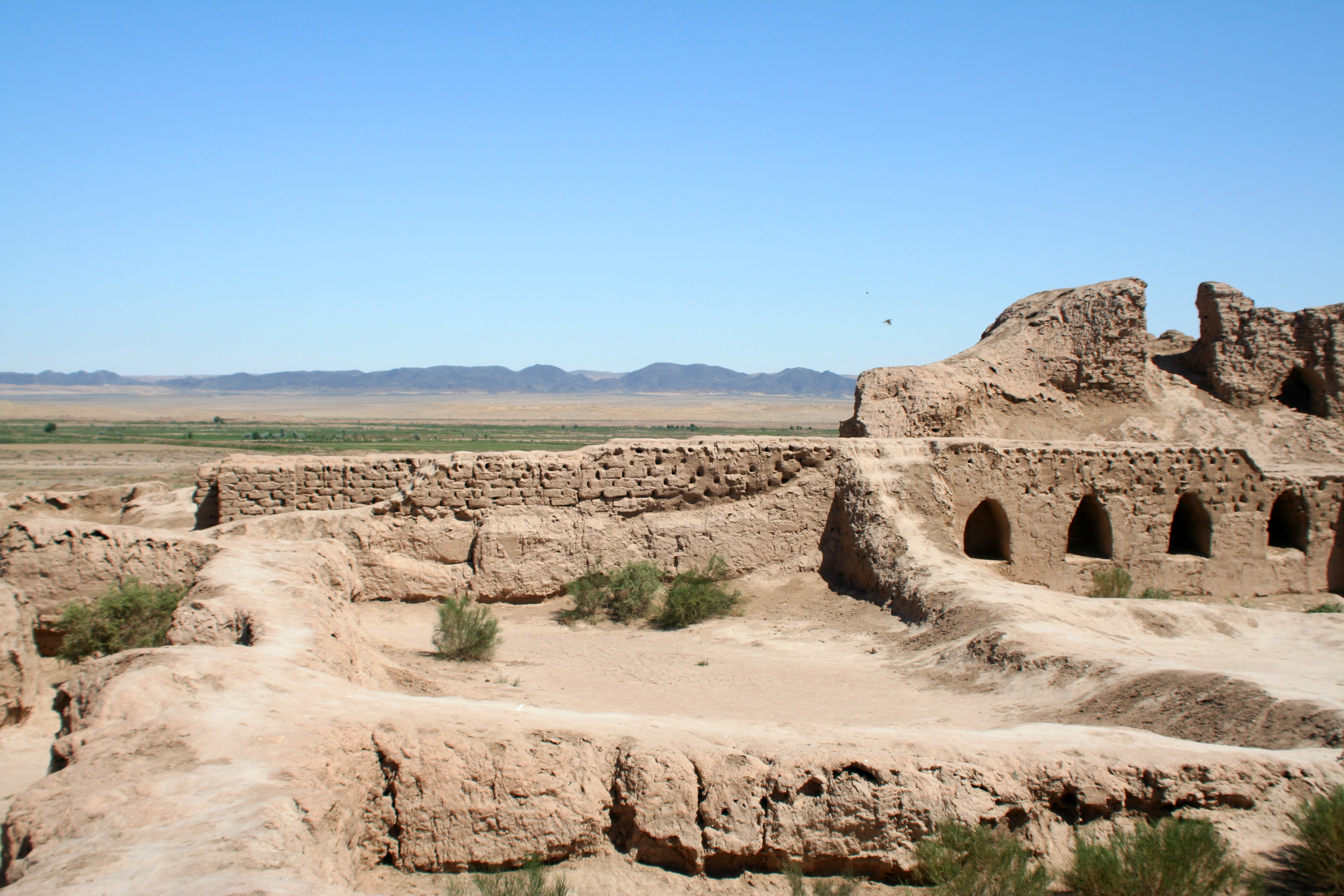
Toprak Kala ruins

=== Artifacts ===
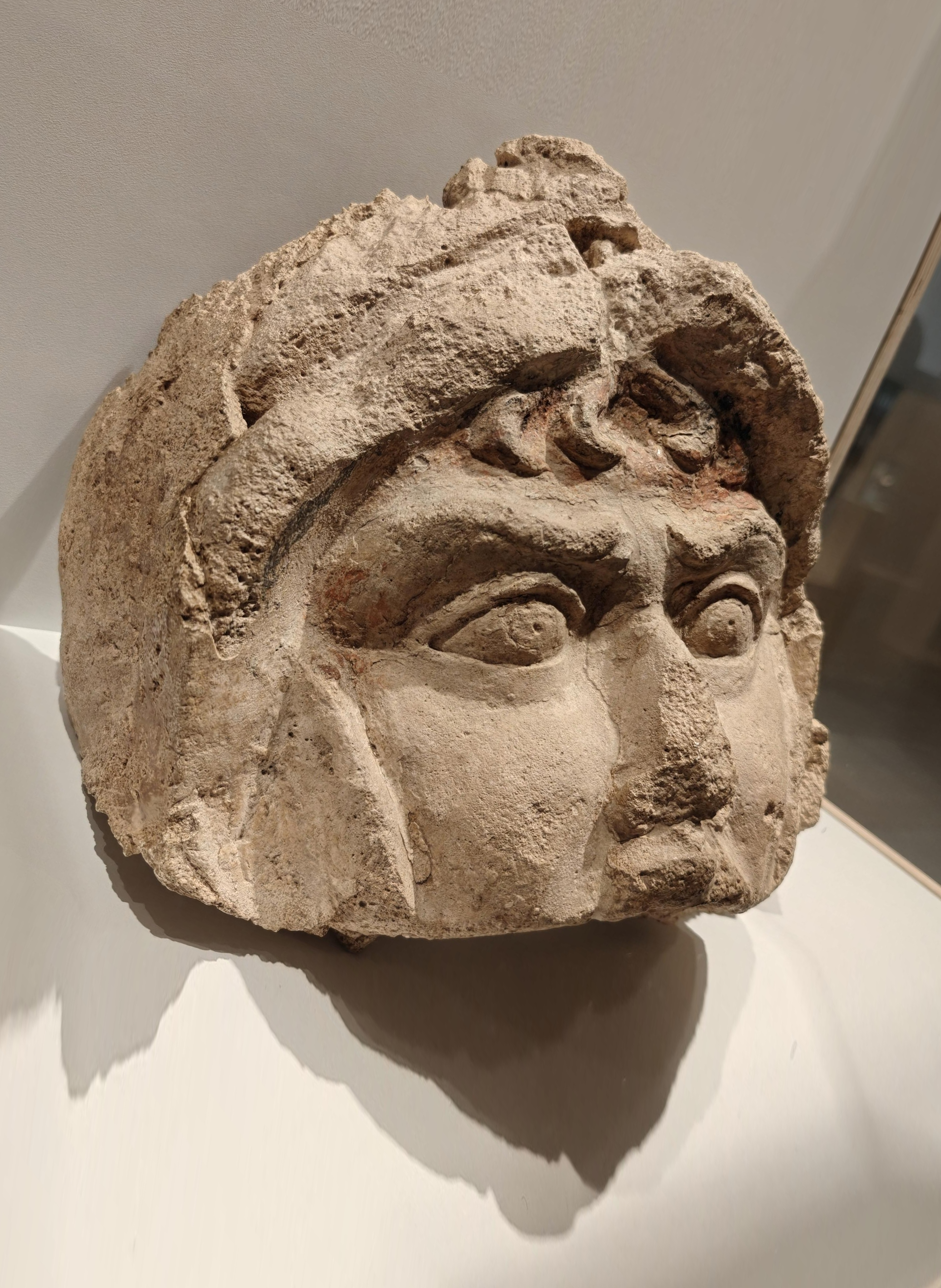
Male head with helmet. Alabaster with traces of paint. High Palace (2nd-3rd century CE)

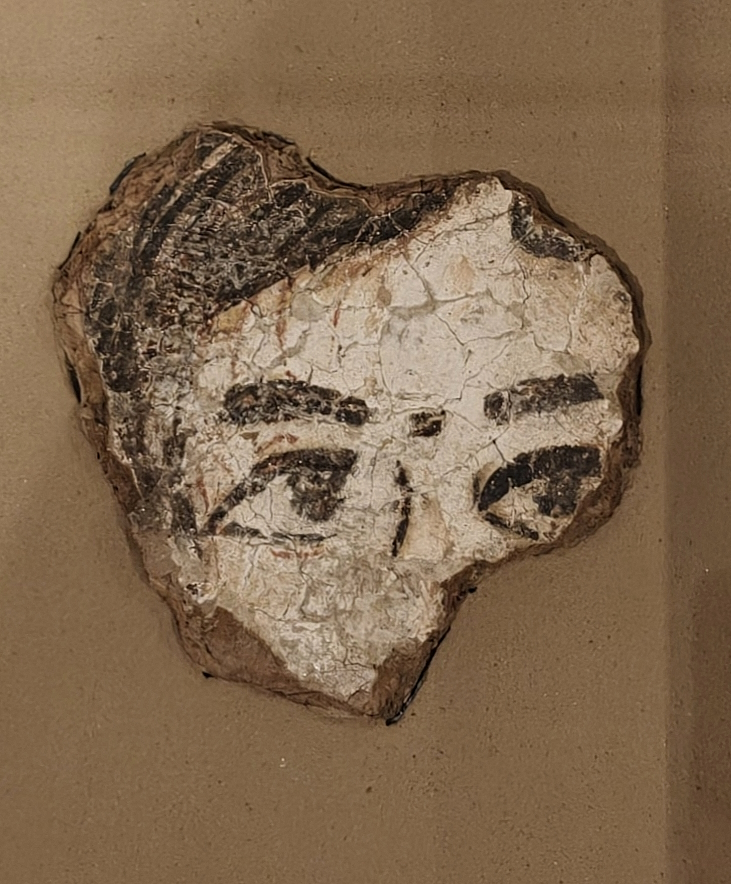
Face of a woman Fragment of a wall painting. Harpist's Hall (2nd-4th century CE).

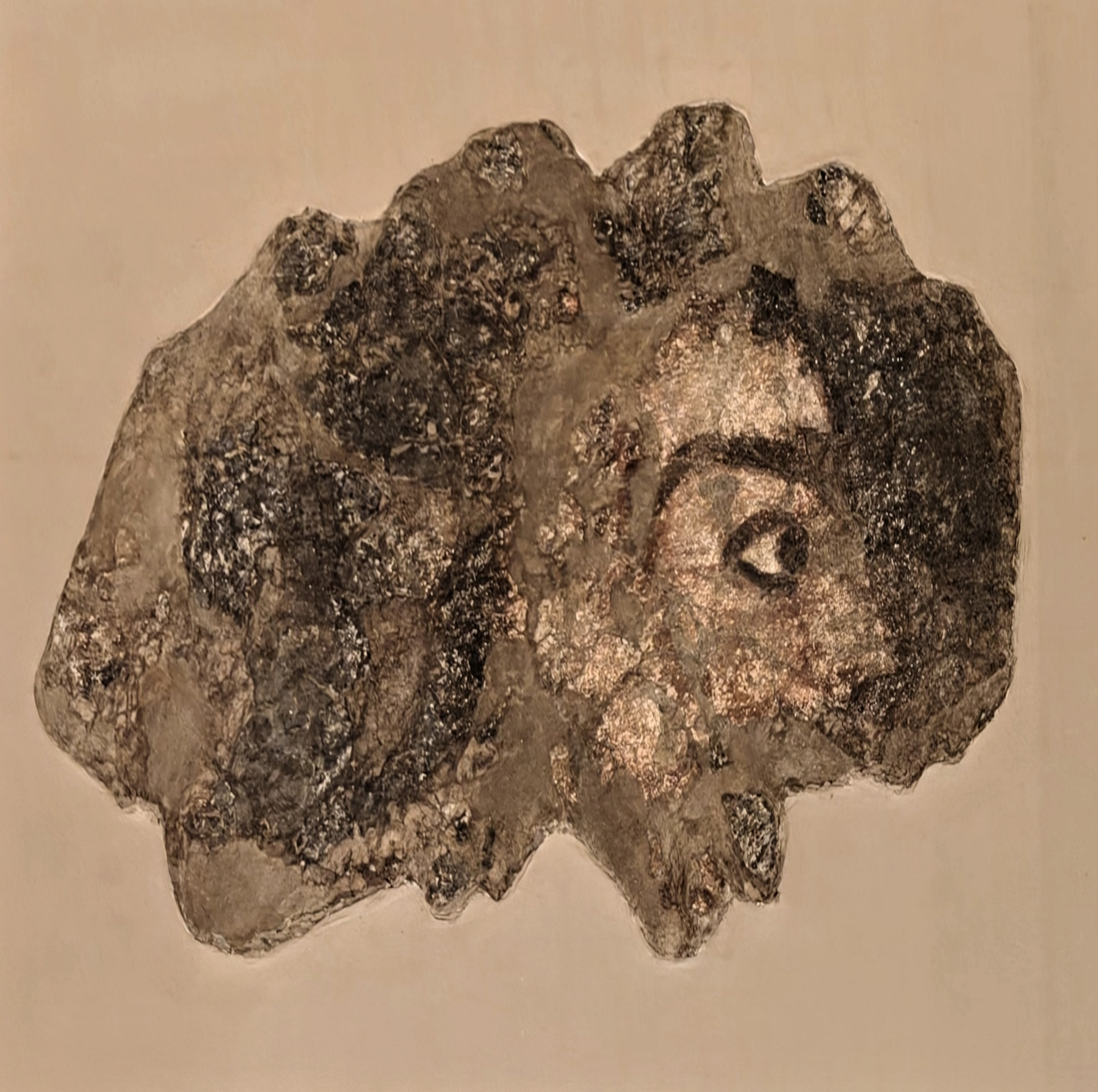
Fragment of a wall painting. 2nd-4th centuries. Clay base, mineral paints

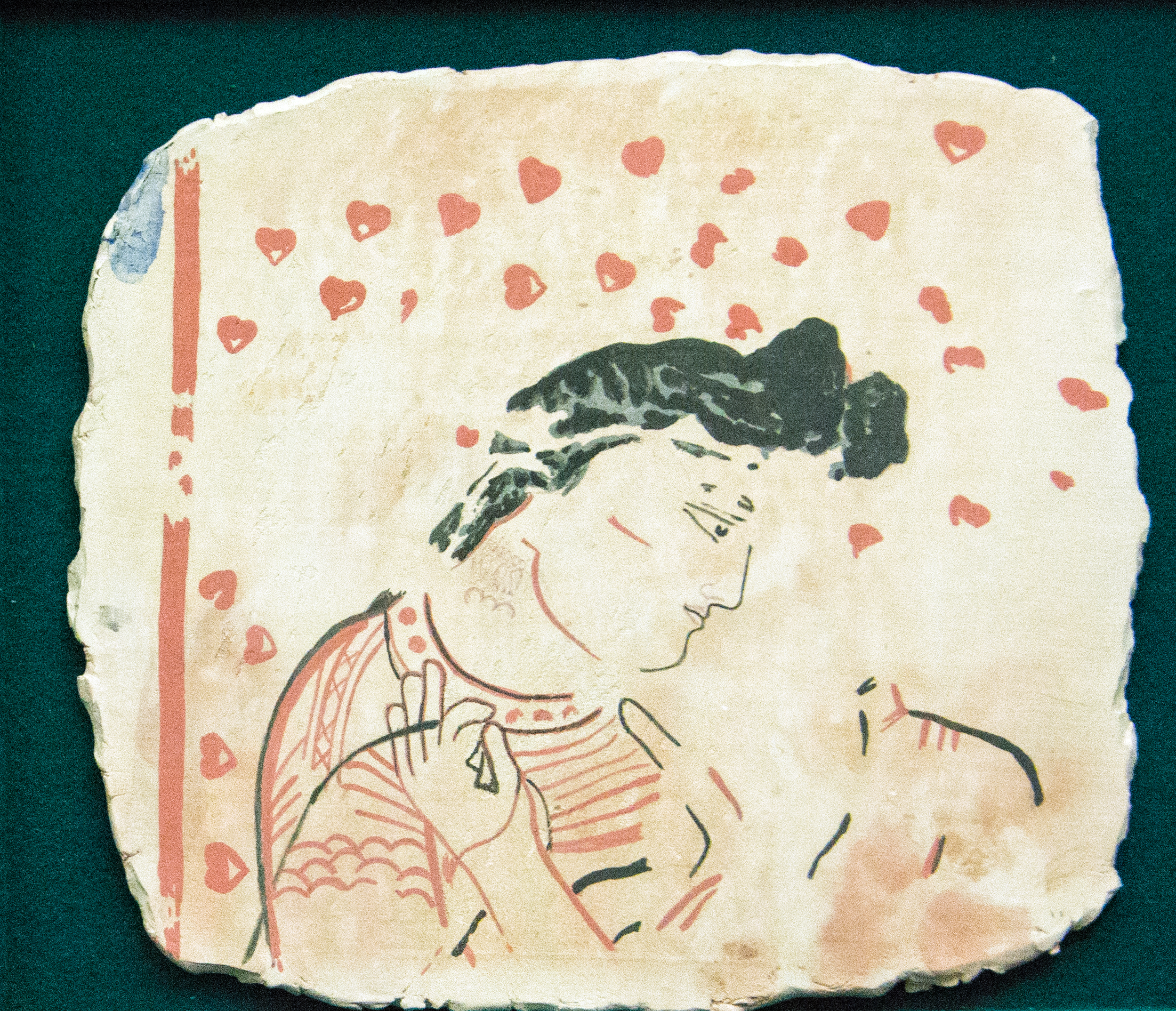
Wall painting found in Toprak-Kala (2nd-3rd century CE)

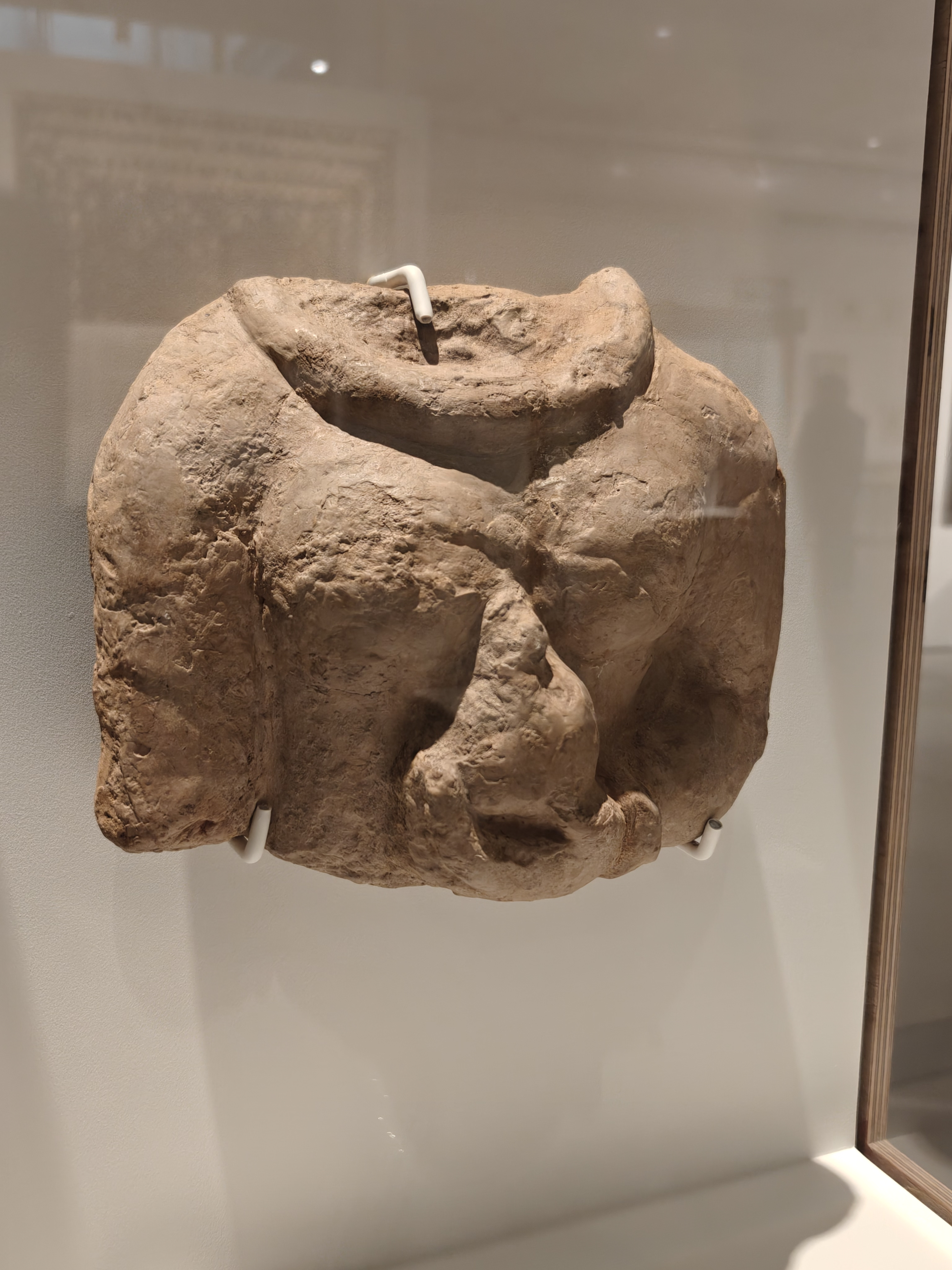
Torso of Anahita

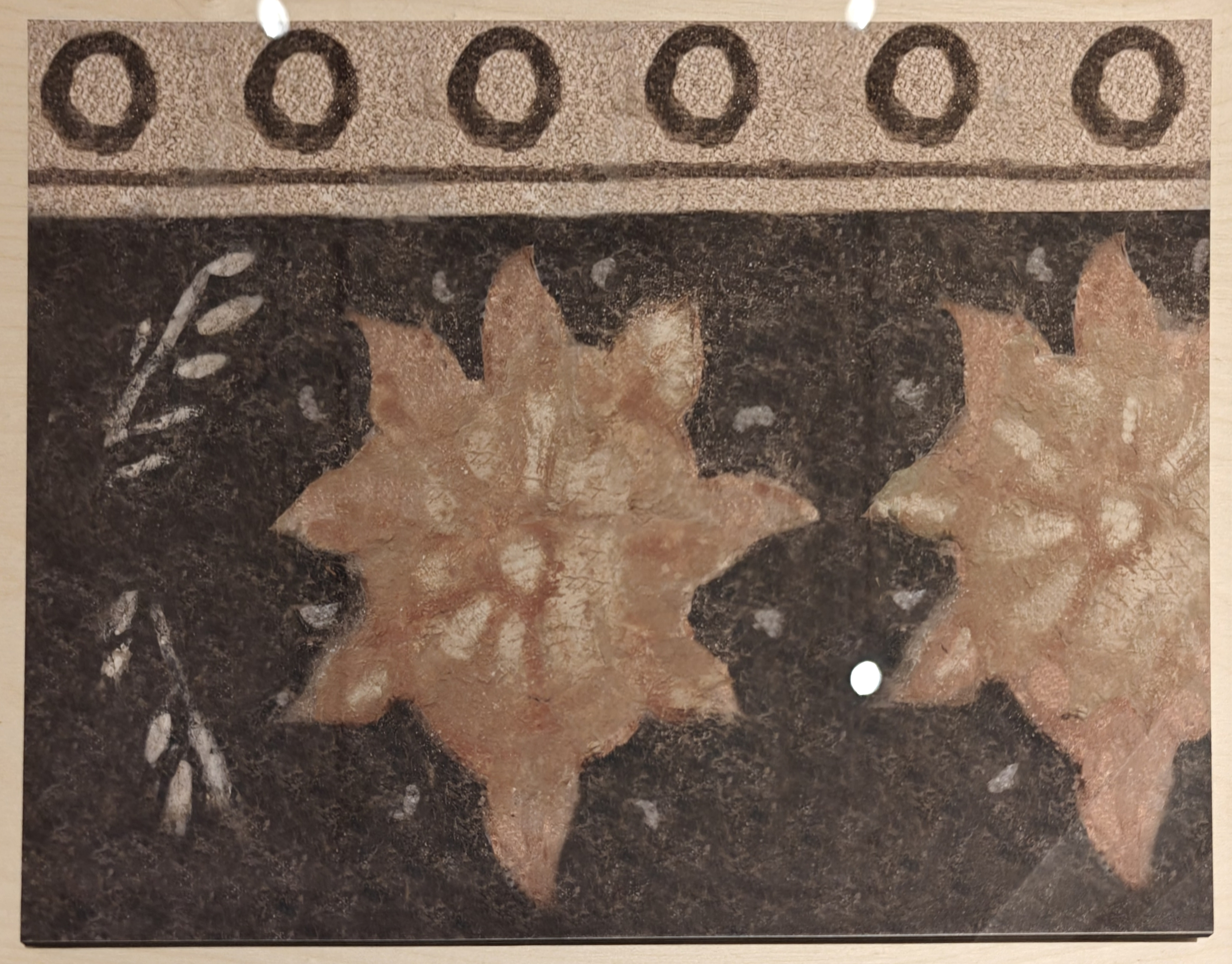
Mosaic

== Nearby Kyzyl-Kala fortress ==
Kyzyl-Kala fortress

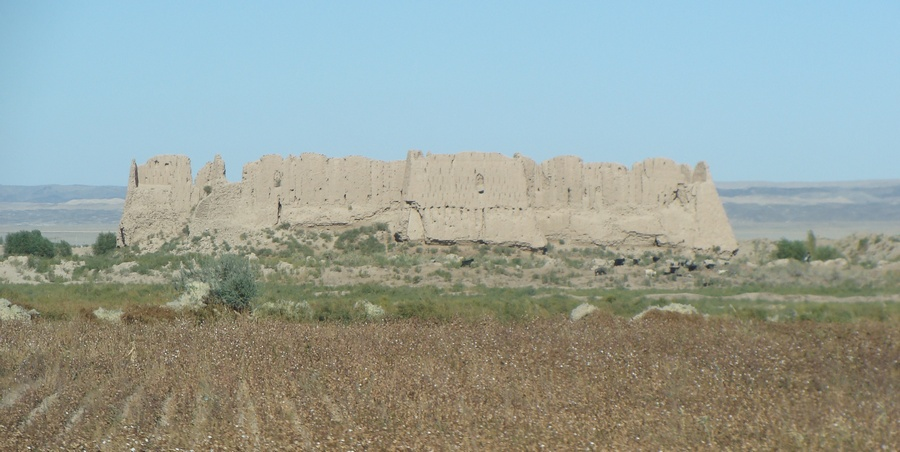
Nearby fortress of Kyzyl-Kala, before modern restoration.

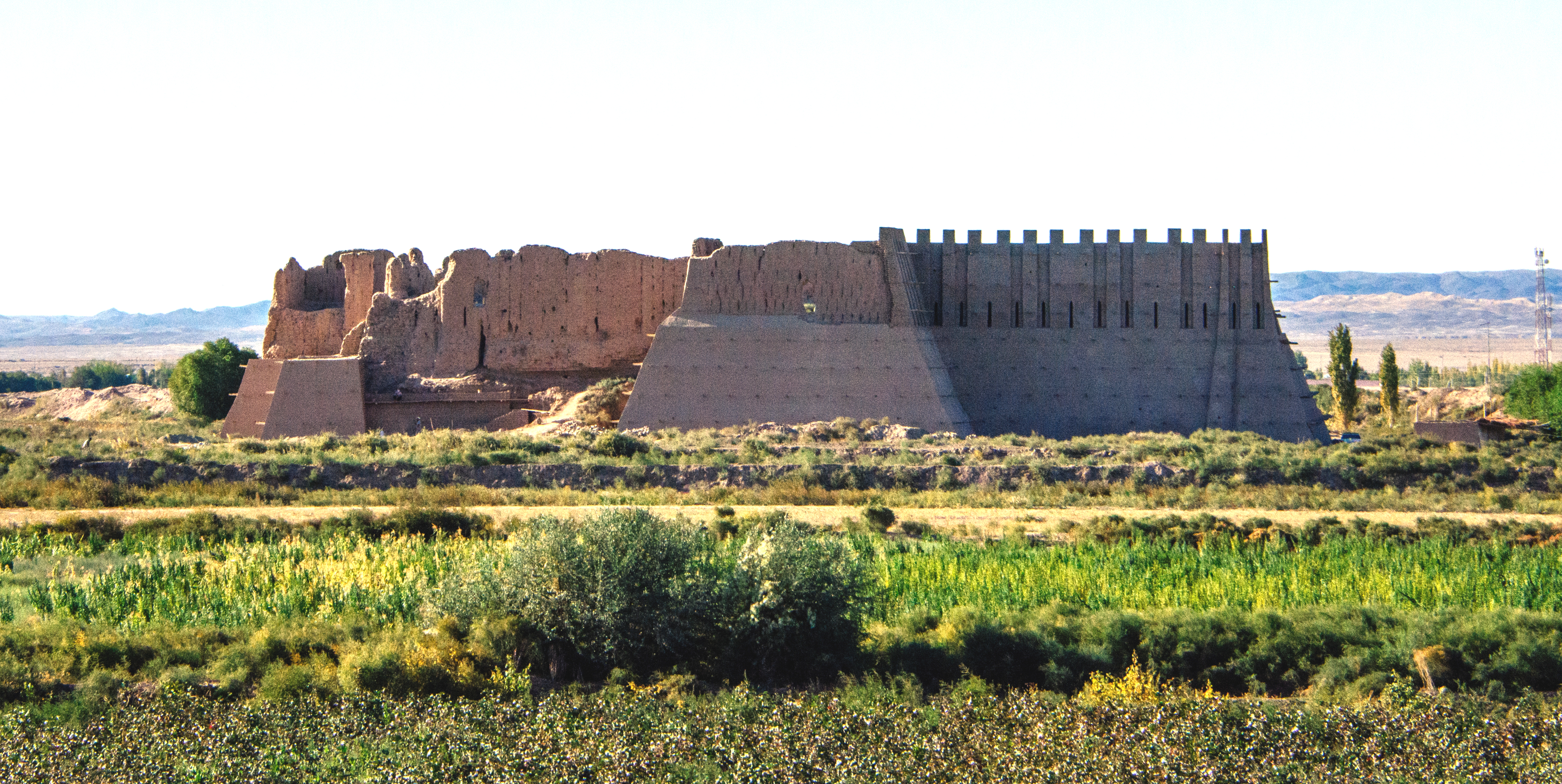
Fortress of Kyzyl-Kala being restored (2018).

The small fortress of Kyzyl-Kala, also "Qyzyl Qala" ("Red fortress") is located nearby, 1 km to the west, and was also built in the 1st-4th century CE, possibly as a fortified defense for the site of Toprak-Kala (41.930031°N 60.784109°E).

Kyzyl-Kala was once restored in the 12th century CE. It has also been the subject of a modern renovation program, with the objective of showing what a fortress looked like originally.

== Related sites ==
Toprak-Kala is somewhat related to another archaeological site 30 km to the southeast, Koi Krylgan Kala, another major component of the "Fifty fortresses oasis". Another related site is Ayaz-Kala.

The location of the Chorasmian capital was changed to Kyat (modern Beruniy), at the time of the Afrighid dynasty sometime after 305 CE, but the town of Toprak-Kala continued to prosper until the 6th century CE.
