= Artav of Khwarazm =

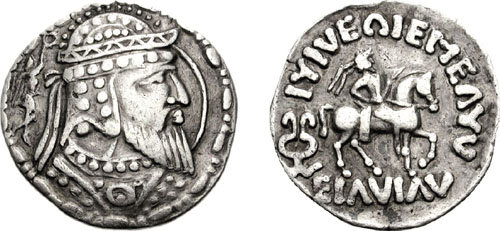
Coin of Artav, ruler of Khwarezm. Blundered Greek legend "ΙΥΙΥΕΩΙΕ ΜΕΛΥΙ ΕΙΛΥΙΛΥ". Nike crowning the bust of the ruler. Khwarazmian tamgha on the reverse. Circa 1st-2nd century CE.

Location of the Khwarazm oasis in Western Asia.

Artav (’rt’w “the just”, also spelled Artabanus) was a Khwarazmian king who ruled the Khwarazm region of Central Asia in the second half of the 2nd century. He was the second king of an unnamed kingdom in Khwarazm, founded by his predecessor, whose name is unknown. Artav, during his reign, started the construction of the city of Toprak-Kala, which became his capital.

Some of his coins were found in his capital city of Toprak-Kala, together with coins of the Kushan Empire rulers Vima Kadphises and Kanishka.

== Sources ==
- Bosworth, Yuri Aleksandrovich (1991). "CHORASMIA i. Archeology and pre-Islamic history". Encyclopaedia Iranica, Vol. V, Fasc. 5. C. Edmund Bosworth. pp. 511–516.
- Fedorov, Michael; Kuznetsov, Andrew (2011). "On some previously unknown Khwarazmian drachms and the names of rulers on them". Iran. 49. Taylor & Francis, Ltd.: 79–88. doi:10.1080/05786967.2011.11834430. JSTOR 41431230. S2CID 192405406.

Unknown	Ruler of Khwarazm; Second half of the 2nd-century	Succeeded by Artramush I
