= Akchakhan-Kala =

Archaeological site in Uzbekistan

- Akchakhan-Kala
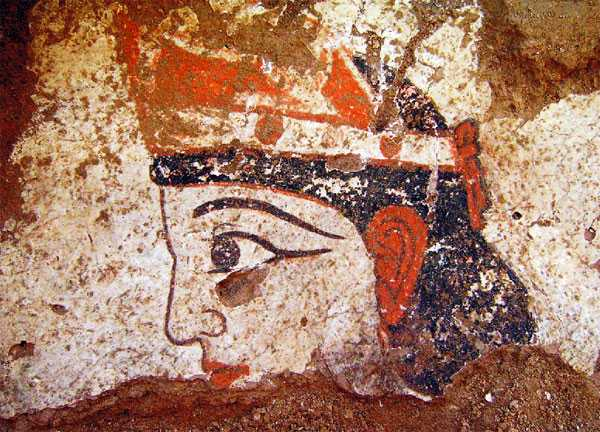
- A mural from Akchakhan-Kala

- Location within West and Central Asia Location within Uzbekistan
- 41°49′41.17″N 60°43′8.67″E
- Type: Settlement
- Periods: Parthian, Sasanian
- Location: Karakalpakstan, Uzbekistan

Site notes
- Condition: Ruined

Akchakhan-Kala, or Akcha-khan Kala, also named after the locality Kazakly-Yatkan/ Kazakl'i-Yatkan, in modern Karakalpakstan, Uzbekistan, was an ancient fortress in Chorasmia built in the 4th/ 3rd century BCE and occupied until it was despoiled in the 2nd century CE. It is part of the "Fifty fortresses oasis" in modern-day Uzbekistan. The abandonment of Akchakhan-Kala was apparently followed by the establishment of the new capital of Toprak-Kala, 14 km to the northeast.

== Excavations ==
Akcha-khan Kala has been the object of numerous excavations, still ongoing. A ceremonial complex with a hypostyle hall was discovered.

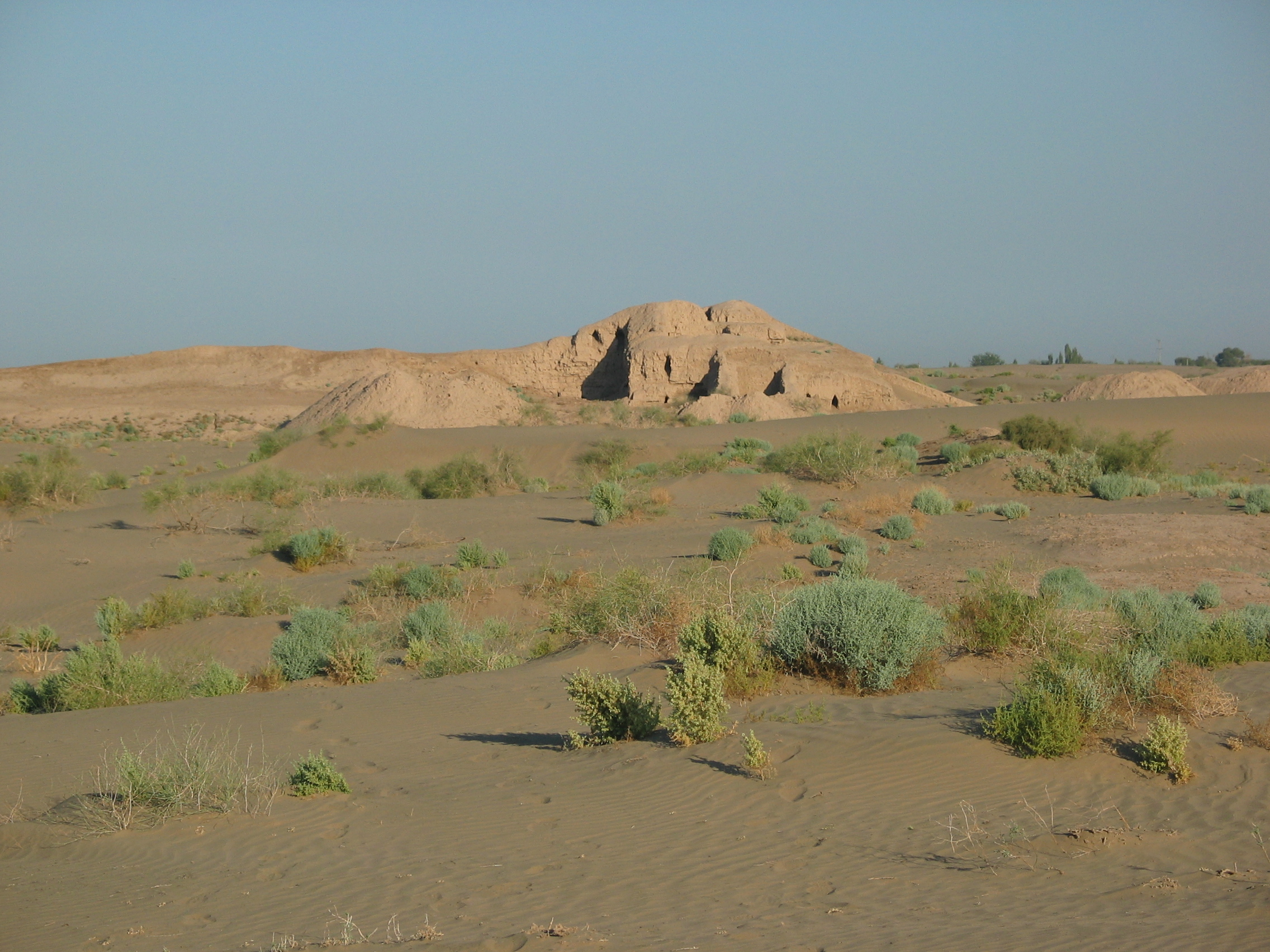
Corner of upper enclosure of Kazakl'i-yatkan

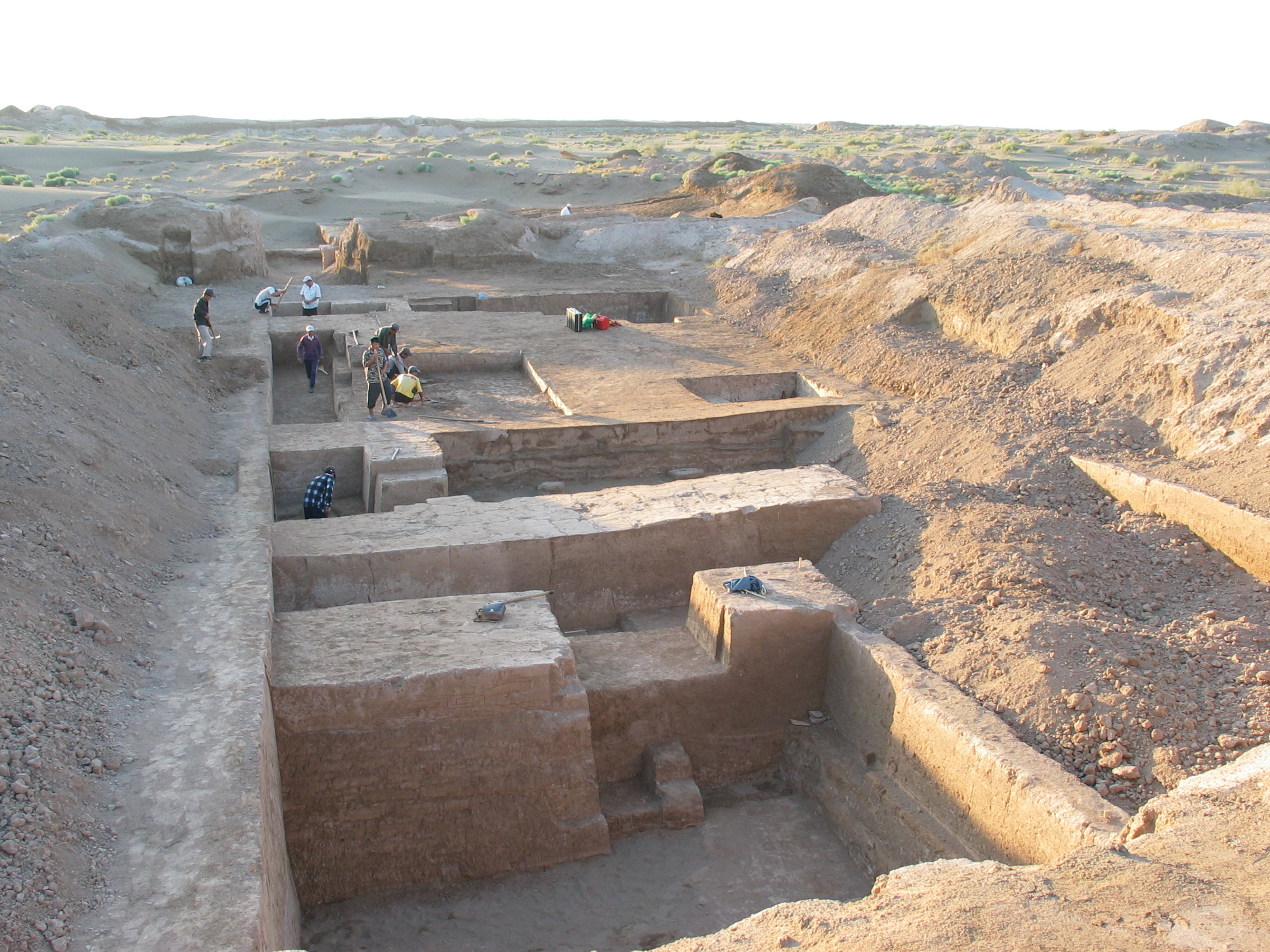
Kazakl'i-yatkan

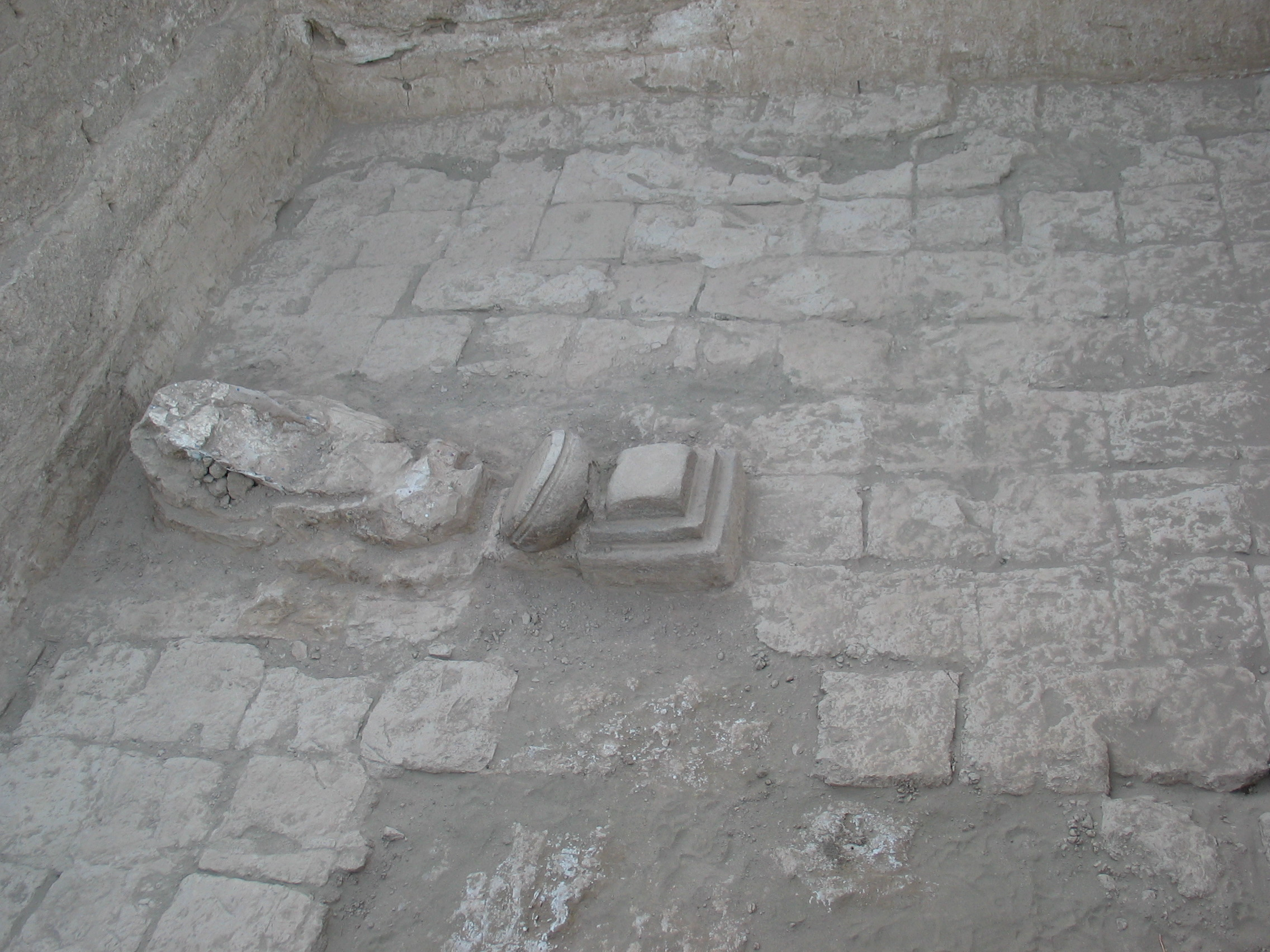
Column base at Kazakl'i-yatkan

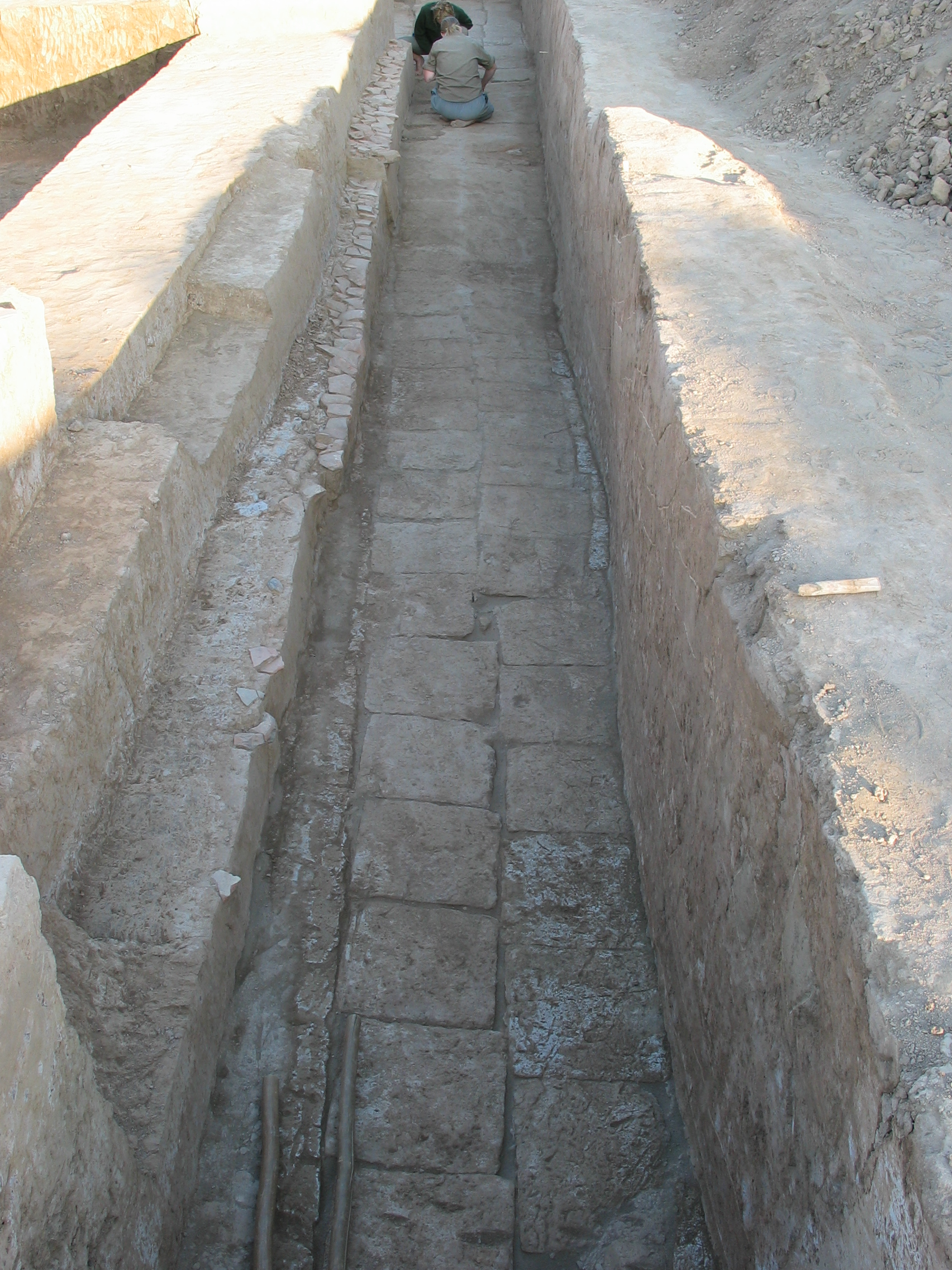
Mud brick floor at Kazakl'i-yatkan

== Paintings ==
Many decorations have been found, belonging to the period from the 1st century BCE to the 2nd century CE: a large quantity of frescoes, unbaked-clay modelled sculptures including fragments of a Ketos in Hellenistic style, and a Zoroastrian fire altar with paintings of colossal Avestan gods. Parthian artistic influences have also been described.

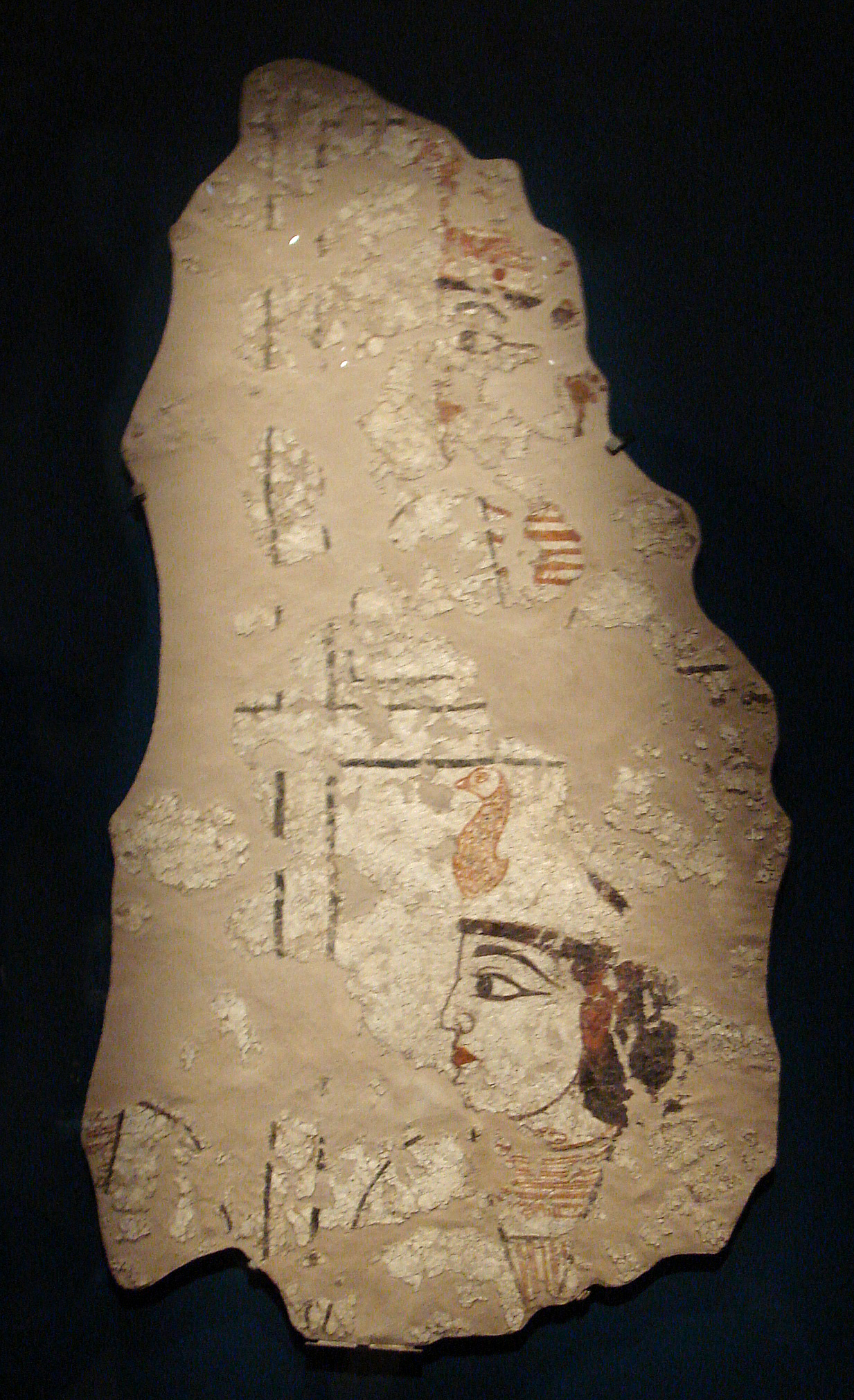
Akchakhan-Kala mural

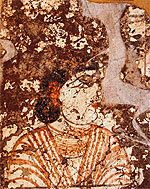
Akchakhan-Kala mural

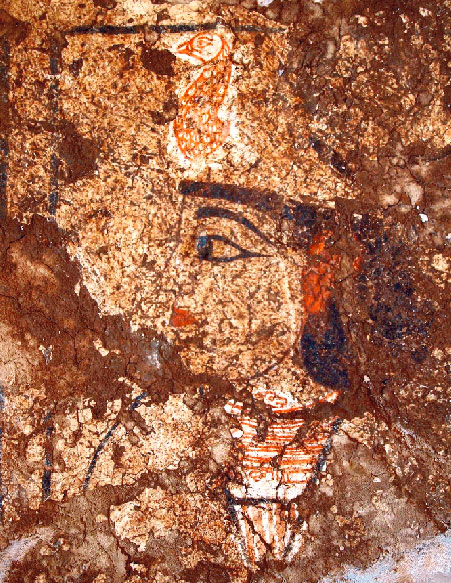
Akchakhan-Kala mural

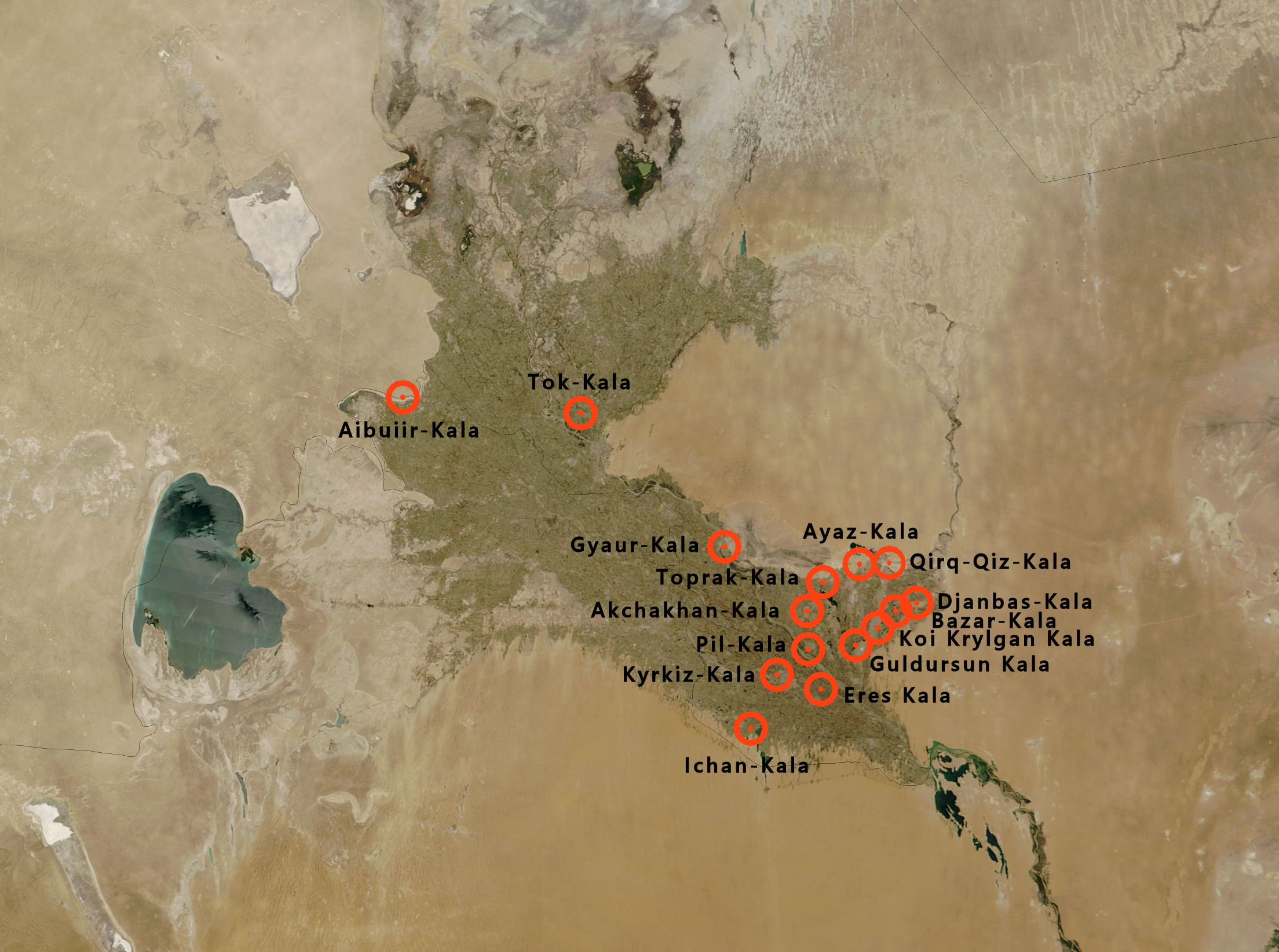
Location of the Akchakhan-Kala fortress in the Chorasmian oasis, in relation to other main fortresses
