= Afrig =

Afrighid ruler of Khwarazm (died 4th century)

- Born: Afrig
- Died: 4th century
- Notable work: Founder of the Afrighid dynasty of Khwarazm; Fortress known as Fil or Fir near his capital in Kath

Afrig (died 4th century) was the Iranian founder of the Afrighid dynasty of Khwarazm. He is said to have built a fortress known as Fil or Fir near his capital in Kath. Not much more is known about him; he was later succeeded by his son Baghra.

Preceded by Wazamar	Ruler of Khwarazm; 305–4th-century	Succeeded by Baghra
