= Wazamar =

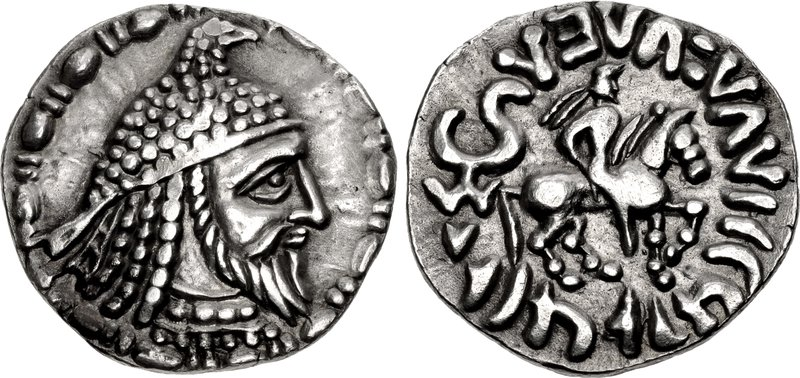
Coin of Wazamar

Wazamar was the ruler of the Khwarazm region of Central Asia in the late 3rd century. He was succeeded by Afrig in c. 305, who founded the Afrighid dynasty.

== Sources ==
- Bosworth, C. Edmund (1984). "ĀL-E AFRĪḠ". Encyclopaedia Iranica, Vol. I, Fasc. 7. C. Edmund Bosworth. pp. 743–745.
- Fedorov, Michael; Kuznetsov, Andrew (2011). "On some previously unknown Khwarazmian drachms and the names of rulers on them". Iran. 49. Taylor & Francis, Ltd.: 79–88. doi:10.1080/05786967.2011.11834430. JSTOR 41431230.

Preceded by Artramush II	Ruler of Khwarazm; Late 3rd-century–305	Succeeded by Afrig
