= Azkajwar II =

- Ruler of Khwarazm
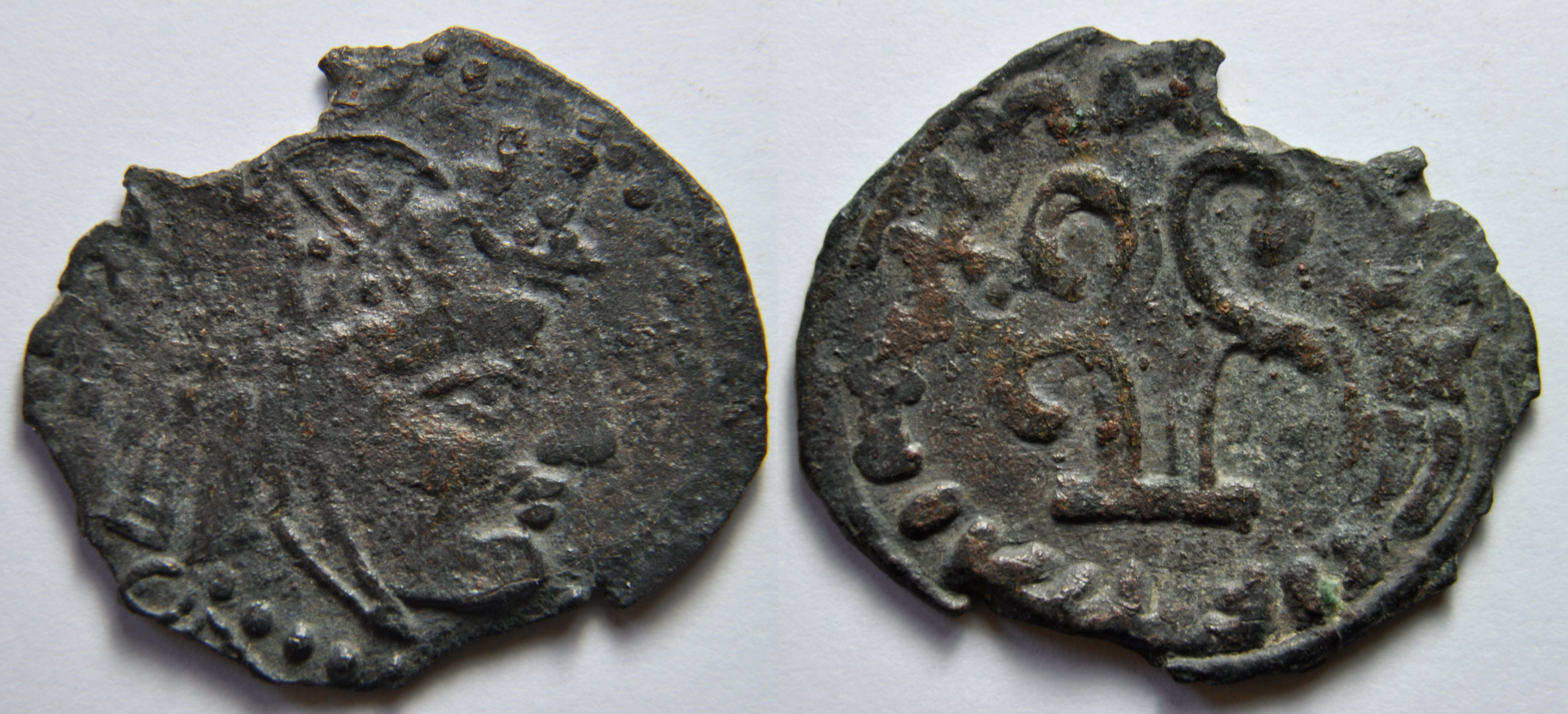
- Coin of Azkajwar II
- Reign: Late 7th century — 712
- Predecessor: Sabri
- Successor: Khusrau
- Died: 712; Khwarazm
- Dynasty: Afrighid dynasty
- Religion: Zoroastrianism

Azkajwar II (died 712) was the ruler of the Afrighid dynasty of Khwarezm from an unknown date to 712. He was the son and successor of Sabri of Khwarezm. Azkajwar II is agreed by most scholars to be the same person as king Jigan or Chigan. In most medieval sources, he is simply called Khwarazmshah (king of Khwarazm).

== Biography ==
Map of Khorasan, Transoxiana and Tokharistan

Azkajwar is first mentioned in the mid-690s, when his kingdom was invaded by Umayya ibn Abdallah, who was the Umayyad governor of Khurasan. Azkajwar's capital, Kath, was shortly captured Umayya, who forced Azkajwar to recognize Umayyad suzerainty. However, after Umayya left Khwarazm, Azkajwar declared independence from the Umayyad Caliphate. During the early 700s, Yazid ibn al-Muhallab, the new Umayyad governor of Khurasan, invaded Khwarazm but was eventually repulsed by the forces of Azkajwar.

Azkajwar is later mentioned in 712, when he was faced by a rebellion of his younger brother Khurrazadh, and had tensions with his rival, the king of Khamjird. Unable to solve his problems, he secretly sent envoys to the new Umayyad governor of Khwarazm, Qutayba ibn Muslim, who was at that time in Merv. Azkajwar and Qutayba shortly made an agreement that Azkajwar would recognize Umayyad authority in return for military aid against his brother. Qutayba shortly sent an army under his brother Abd al-Rahman to Hazarasp, where he defeated and killed the king of Khamjird, and captured 4,000 of his soldiers, who were shortly executed. Meanwhile, Qutayba defeated the supporters of Khurrazadh and captured the latter, who was given to Azkajwar who shortly had him executed.

However, an anti-Umayyad rebellion shortly broke out in Khwarazm, which resulted in the overthrow and death of Askajwar, and the coronation of an Afrighid prince named Khusrau as the king of Khwarazm. However, Khusrau was shortly defeated and killed by the Umayyads, who made Azkajwar's son Askajamuk II the new ruler of Khwarazm.

== Sources ==
- Gibb, H. A. R. (1923). The Arab Conquests in Central Asia. London: The Royal Asiatic Society. OCLC 685253133.
- Nerazik, E. E.; Bulgakov, P. G. (1996). Litvinsky, B. A. (ed.). Khwarizm. History of Civilizations of Central Asia, Volume 3. Vol. III: The crossroads of civilizations: A.D. 250 to 750. Paris: UNESCO Publishing. pp. 207–231 [207, 224]. ISBN 978-92-3-103211-0.
- Wellhausen, Julius (1927). The Arab Kingdom and Its Fall. Calcutta: University of Calcutta. OCLC 752790641.

Preceded by Sabri	Ruler of Khwarazm; Late 7th-century–712	Succeeded by Khusrau
