= Sulton Uvays Bobo Complex =

Historical monument in Karakalpakstan

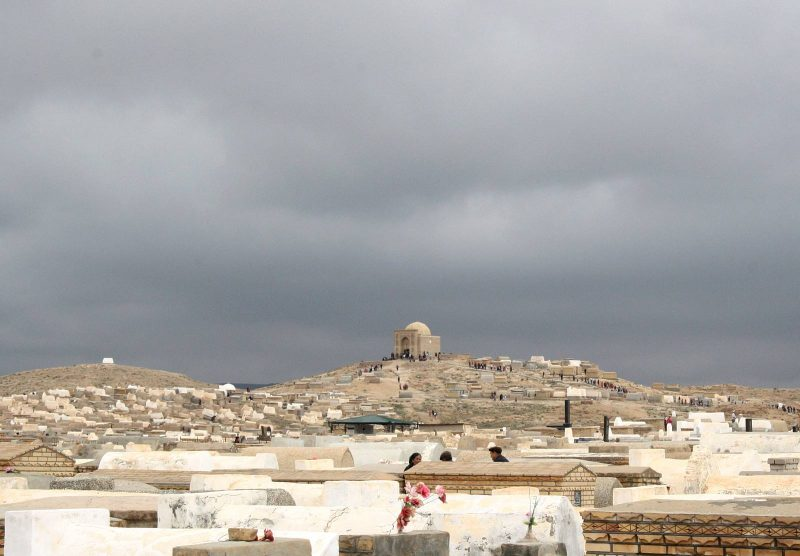
- Sulton Uvays Bobo Complex
- Interactive map of the Sulton Uvays Bobo Complex area

General information
- Status: Historical monument
- Location: Beruniy District, Karakalpakstan
- Coordinates: 42.01104141590358°N 60.64530021741188°E
- Named for: Sulton Uvays
- Year built: 17th to 19th centuries
- Renovated: 2002

Dimensions
- Other dimensions: 21.5 x 53 meters

Technical details
- Structural system: Burnt brick (Khorezm architectural traditions)

Design and construction
- Architect: Olloqulixon shaykh (19th century)

The Sulton Uvays Bobo Complex is a historical monument built between the 17th and 19th centuries in Beruniy District, in the Uzbek autonomous republic of Karakalpakstan.

== History ==
Sulton Uvays (real name: Suhayl ibn Omir ibn Rumon ibn Nohiya ibn Murod) was born in the Murodiy tribe of Qaran village in Yemen (in 625 CE). He was killed at the age of 32 in the Battle of Siffin (657 CE) between the armies of Ali and Mu'awiya. He was buried in Sofa village in Syria. Sulton Uvays was engaged in collecting hadiths in the first half of the 7th century. His followers built a symbolic tomb (Shohabbos in present-day Beruniy) and a pilgrimage site in the 17th century. Olloqulixon shaykh built a large mosque and 10 separate cells in the 19th century. The complex is rectangular 21.5 x 53 meters, oriented from north to south. Sulton Bobo's tomb, later built tombs (mostly domed) and other buildings are surrounded by a wooden wall on the north side of the courtyard. There are a mosque, a veranda, rooms and guest houses on the south side. The complex is entered from the west. It was built in the Middle Ages on the basis of Khorezm architectural traditions (burnt brick). The entrance part of the pilgrimage site was renovated in 2002 on the initiative of the Khorezm region administration.

== Description ==
The parts of the complex are located among the old cemetery and around it. The complex includes the following:

1. Chinor Bobo's tomb at the highest point of the cemetery.

2. Sulton Uvays Bobo's tomb on the southern slope of the hill.

3. A sacred spring that flows from under the foot of the saint buried in front of the gate of Sulton Uvays Bobo's pilgrimage site, according to legends, and a sacred pool where sacred fish that no one eats live, fed by this spring.

4. The dry bed of a canal that once flowed from the spring and the lake, along which pilgrims built obo (conical and pyramidal structures made of stone) in the hope of being cured of infertility.

5. A mountain located two or three km away from the tomb, which, according to local legends, was the place where Sulton Uvays Bobo fasted for 40 days, prayed for forgiveness for all Muslims and spat out all his teeth there. A sign of his resemblance to Muhammad, who lost a tooth in the Battle of Uhud.

Sulton Uvays Bobo's tomb and the large necropolis around it underwent many extensions during its centuries-long activity. These include: mosques and guest houses for pilgrims, kitchen, places for sacrifice.

There is a large rectangular pool at the entrance to the tomb, and its water flows from underground springs. There are fish in the pool that no one eats and dead fish are buried in a special ceremony.

Drinking water from this pool is one of the main goals of the pilgrim. According to popular belief, Sulton Uvays fasted in these places, and an underground spring began to flow from the place where he stepped on.

The Chinor Bobo Tomb, which is located at the top of the hill, is also part of the Sulton Uvays Bobo Complex. According to the tradition, the pilgrims visit this tomb first, and then go to the grave of Sulton Uvays. This rule stems from the belief that Chinor-bobo was the spiritual mentor of Sulton Uvays in some sources, or his muezzin (the one who calls for prayer) in others. In some other sources, he is said to have been the barber of the saint. Therefore, the Chinor Bobo Tomb is located higher than the hill, and the pilgrims visit it first. However, there is no biographical information or sources about the personality of Chinor Bobo, and the researchers (especially, G. P. Snesarev) have concluded that he is a mythical character associated with local beliefs.

The tomb complex is surrounded by a cemetery on all sides, and the tombstones are arranged in rows around the hills. Among the Karakalpaks, it is customary to call ordinary cemeteries saints, but the name of the Mozor is capitalized in relation to the Sulton Uvays Bobo pilgrimage site.

At the top of the mountain slopes, there are several small hollow depressions, which, according to the local population, are the traces of Sulton Bobo's feet and bones. There is an open area for parking cars, as well as rows for traders who sell tumors and other religious items. The road leading to the hills is covered with brightly colored mats and lined with tree branches that lead to small pilgrimage sites. Similar ceremonies and sacrifices are performed by pilgrims in the hope of fulfilling various wishes - such as healing a sick person or a woman's infertility.
