= Castles in Karakalpakstan =

Fortified structures in Karakalpakstan

Coordinates: 41°55′37.9″N 60°49′19.8″E

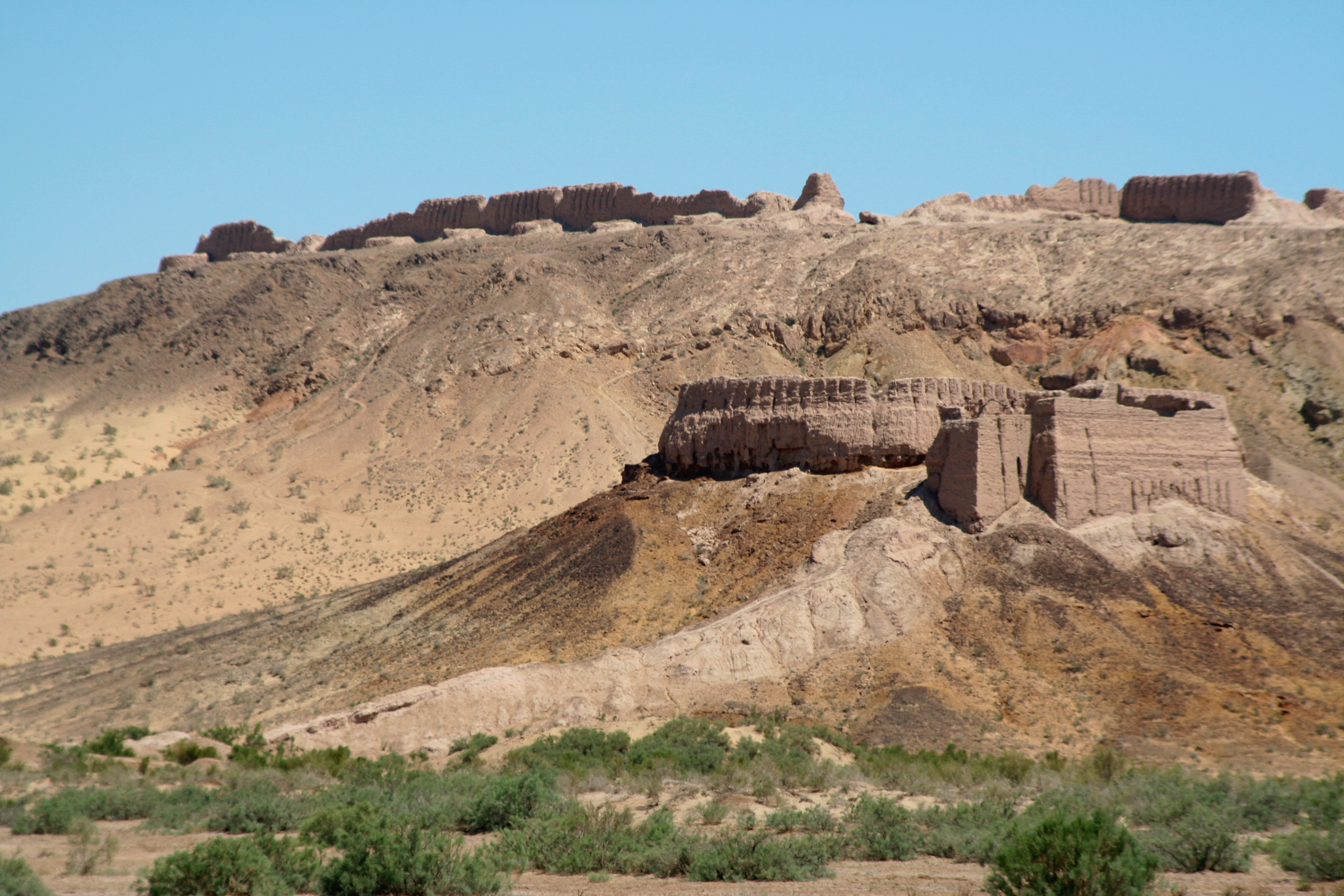
Ayaz-Kala's first two castles, built in fourth century BCE and sixth century CE

Castles in Karakalpakstan, are structures that combine fortifications and places of residence in modern Karakalpakstan, Uzbekistan. Referred to in Karakalpak as Elliq Qala, 'fifty fortresses', they were first built in antiquity as desert castles, often out of adobe. The castles and cities in general experienced a decline during later periods, such as during the Mongol invasion of the Khwarazmian Empire.

Several castles have been submitted to UNESCO’s Tentative List for World Heritage Site by Uzbekistan, with the last submission in 2025 including 17 structures.

== Geography ==
The Khorezm Oasis is an area of the Amu Darya river delta in western Central Asia. It is bordered to the north by the Aral Sea, to the east by the Kyzylkum Desert, and the south by the Karakum Desert. To the west is the Ustyurt Plateau. Today, the region is divided between Uzbekistan (including the autonomous Republic of Karakalpakstan) and Turkmenistan.

== History ==
Khorezm has been occupied by humans since Paleolithic times. The first fortified sites date from the 7th century BC, and the number and size of the fortresses increased from the 6th to 4th centuries BC once Khorezm became a vassal state of the Achaemenid Empire.

Khorezm became an independent state between the 4th century BC and the 1st century AD. The Greek historian Arrian records that Pharasmenes, king of Khorezm, visited Alexander the Great in Samarkand and offered his assistance in subjugating lands bordering Khorezm. Power struggles in the wake of Alexander’s death destabilised much of Central Asia, and displaced tribes, including the Kushans, moved west. The Kushans certainly influenced Khorezm, though it is unclear if Khorezm was formally part of their empire.

From the 4th century, Khorezm was subject to multiple attacks, including from the Huns, the Turks, and, later, the Arabs. The Afrighids (305-995) brought some stability, but they continued to fortify Khorezm to protect their territory and overland trade.

== Main sites ==
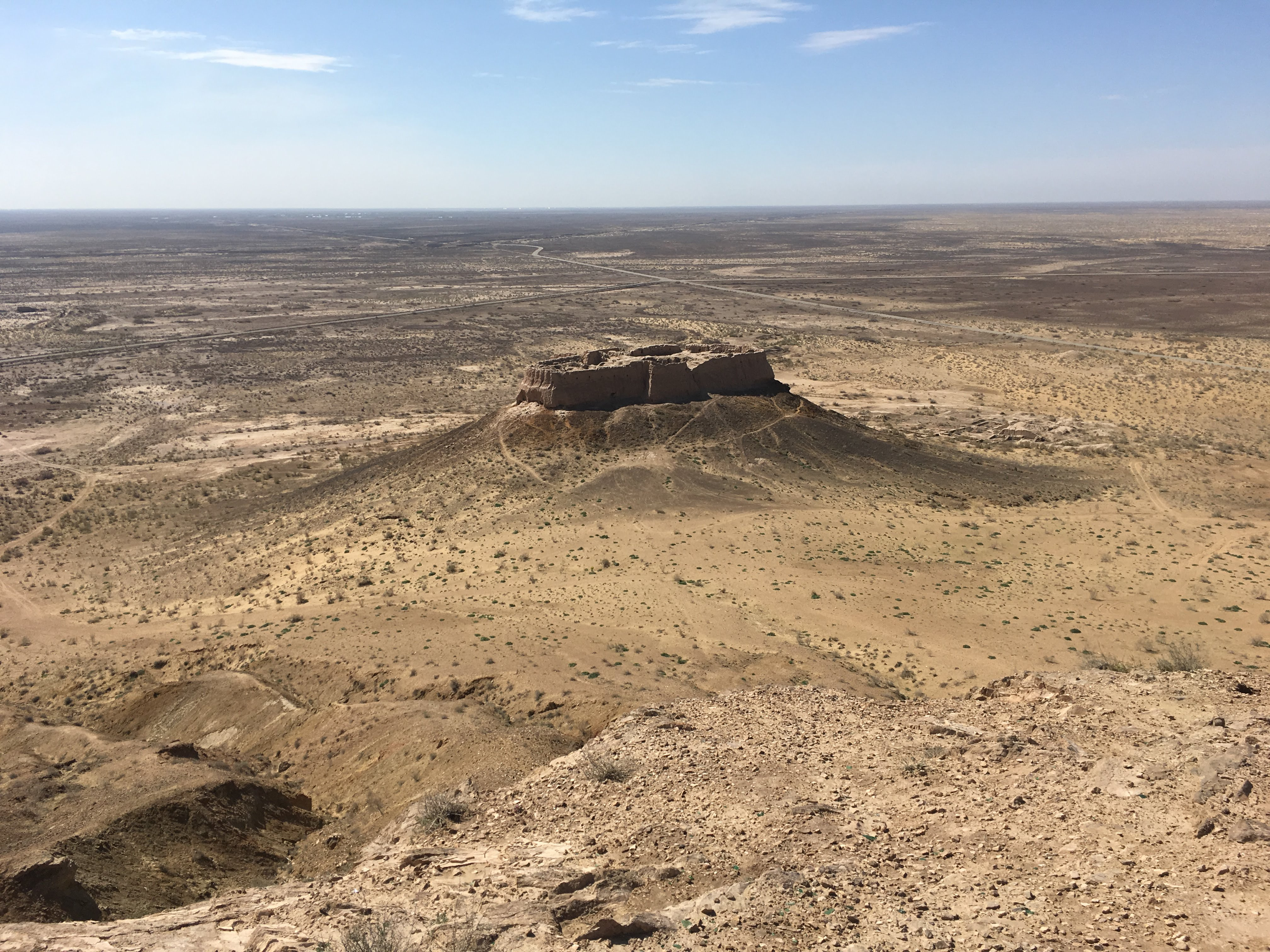
Ayaz Qala, Khorezm Fortresses, Uzbekistan

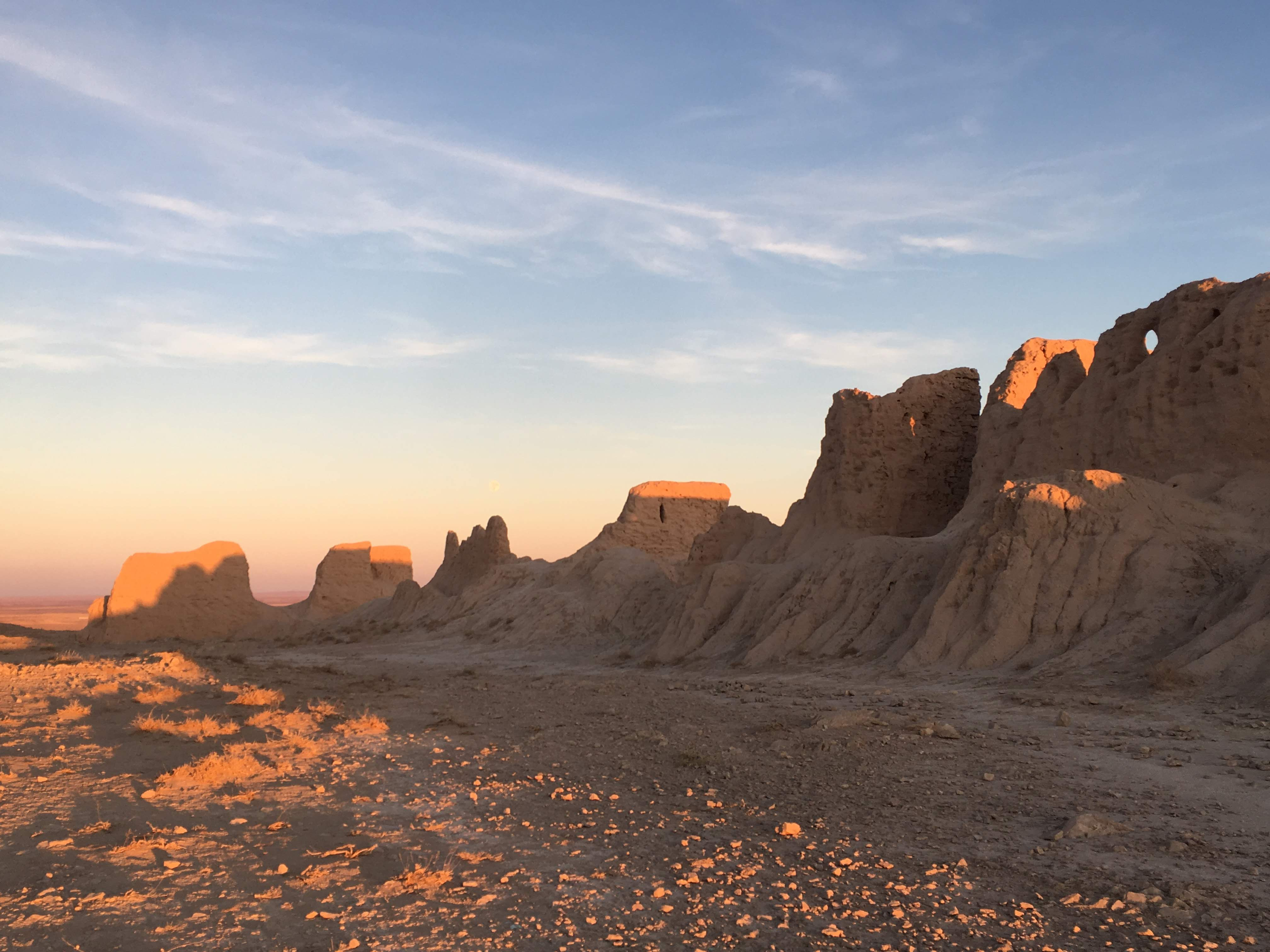
Ayaz Qala, Khorezm Fortresses, Uzbekistan

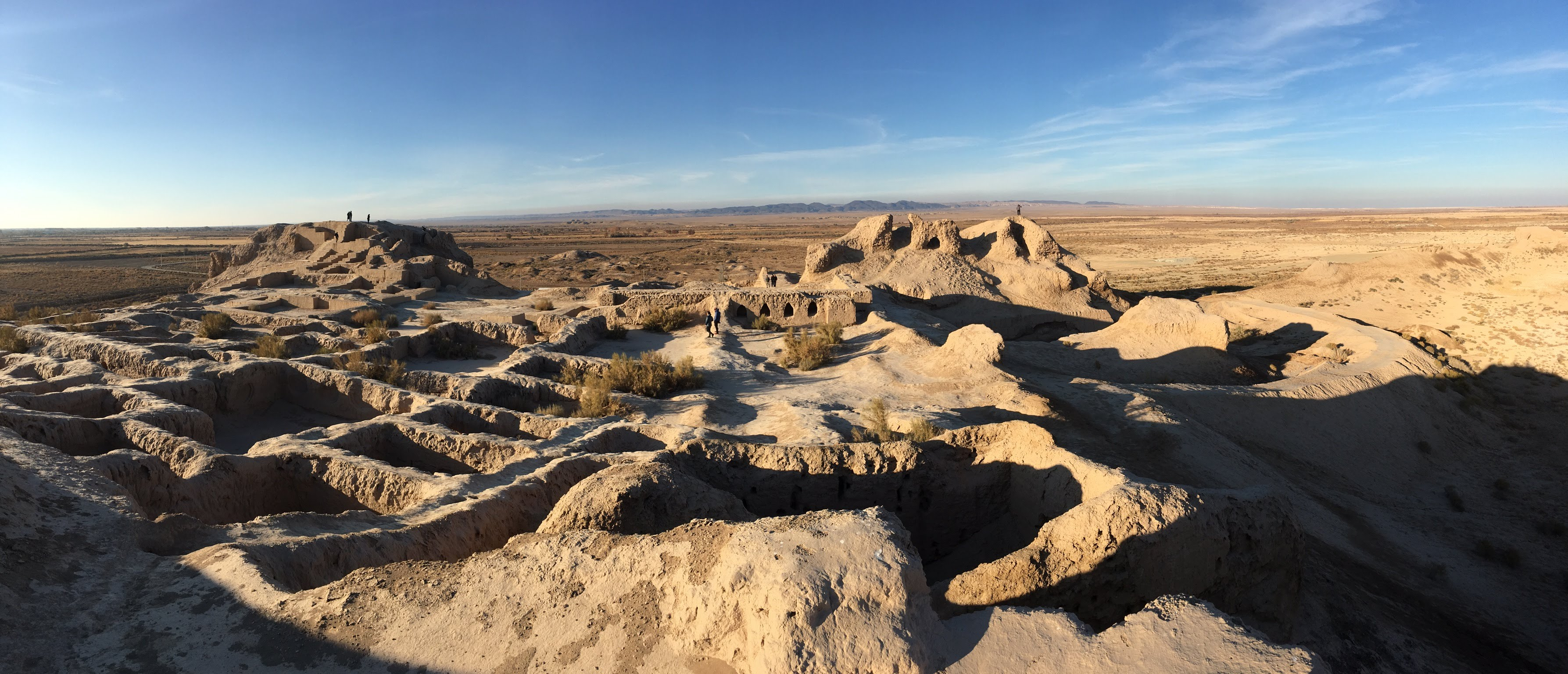
Topraq Qala, Uzbekistan

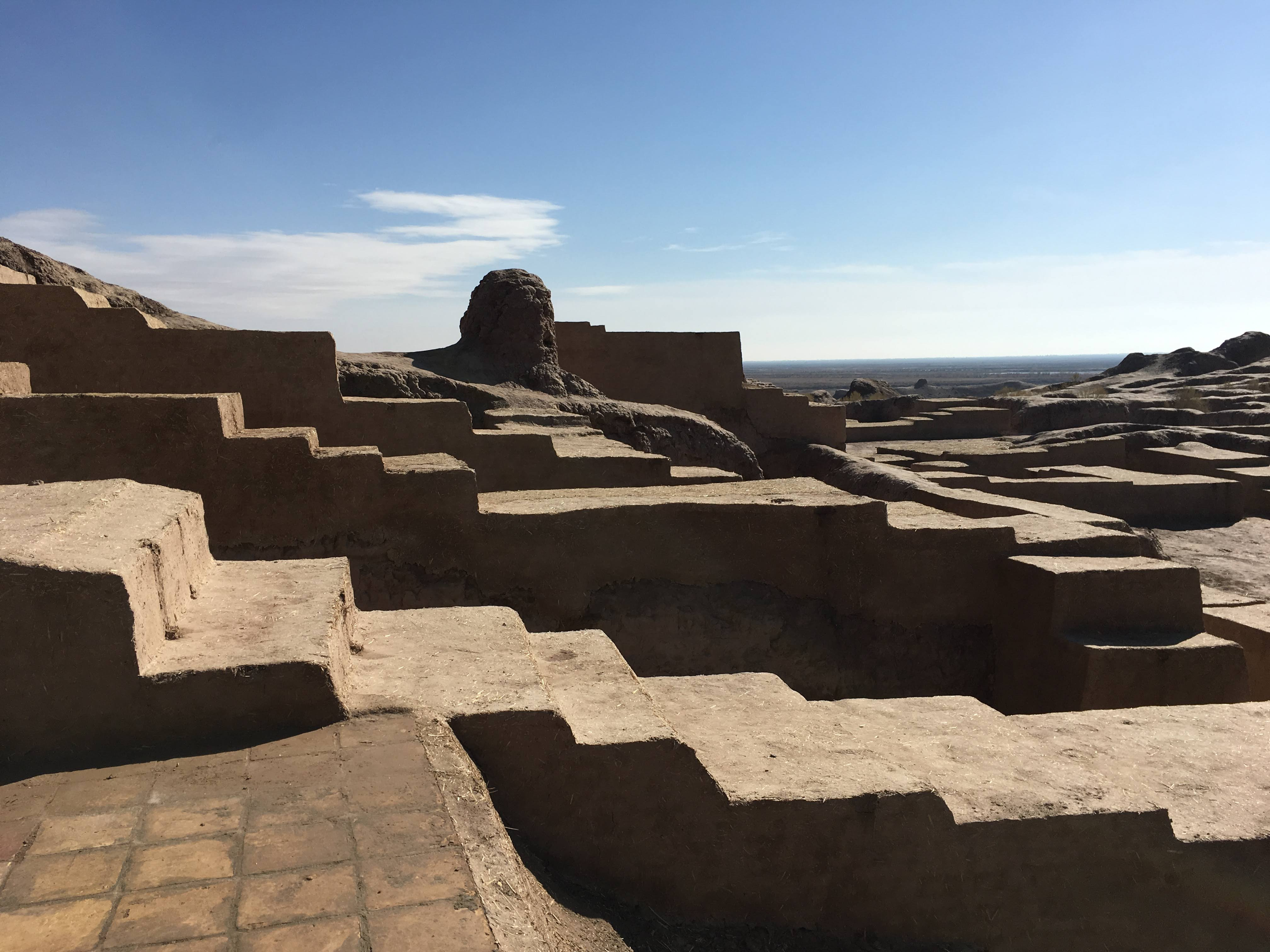
Topraq Qala, Uzbekistan

- Akchakhan Qala was one of the largest and most complex sites in ancient Khorezm. It was founded in the early 2nd century BC and inhabited for around 350 years. Traces of monumental buildings have been found within the city, including an impressive colonnade, columns supported by pedestals, ornamental stucco, and wall paintings. It was abandoned in favour of Topraq Qala.
- Ayaz Qala is an archeological site with three fortresses, the earliest of which dates from the 4th century BC. The footprint of the best preserved fortress is huge, measuring 182x152m. Some of the remaining sections of wall are 10 m high, with regularly spaced towers. There is a massive gateway, battlements with crenellated tops, ramparts, and the remains of vaulted ceilings.
- Guldursun-Kala was built in the 7-8th centuries AD on the foundations of an older fortress. It was then expanded by the 12-13th centuries to become the largest fortress in Khorezm, and a fine example of medieval town planning. The adobe brick walls are preserved in some places to a height of 15 m, giving a good impression of how imposing this fort would have been. Legend has it that the fortress was only taken when Princess Guldursun opened the gates to let in her lover, a Kalmyk warrior. He entered with his troops, killed everyone he found, and destroyed Big Guldursun.
- Construction of Djanbas Qala began in the 4th century BC. The fortified walls housed a garrison with 2,000 soldiers, as well as housing, bazaars, and a fire temple. It is unique amongst the Khorezm Fortresses because of its lack of towers.
- Qyzyl Qala means “Red Fort”. It was built and occupied at the same time as Topraq Qala between the 1st to 4th centuries AD and then restored in the 12th century to provide defence against the Mongol invasion. This fortress was built on a square plan (most of the others are rectangular) and some sections of the walls still stand 16 m high. Some relatively recent preservation work has been done, and the interiors are in good condition.
- Topraq Qala is 17 hectares in size and has a rectangular structure. At its height, it accommodated a population of 2,500 people. Topraq Qala was both a fortress and a royal residence, and archeologists have identified a throne room, fire temple, and an armoury inside the citadel. An ancient system of canals brought water to the city from a now dry branch of the Amu Darya. The palace is one of the largest and best preserved Kushan era monumental buildings in Central Asia.

== See also ==
- Architecture of Uzbekistan
