= Chorasmian era =

The Chorasmian era was a calendar era (year numbering) used in Chorasmia (Khwarazm) between the 1st and 8th centuries AD.

The epoch (first year) of the era is not known precisely, but fell between 42 BC and AD 20. It probably marked the independence of Chorasmia from the Parthian Empire and the establishment of a native dynasty. It was probably the official calendar. It was in use for at least 738 years, since that is the latest dating found using the era.

The Chorasmians used a variant of the Zoroastrian calendar with Chorasmian names for the months and days.

== Bibliography ==
- Azarpay, Guity (1983). "The Development of the Arts in Transoxiana". In Ehsan Yarshater (ed.). The Cambridge History of Iran. Vol. 3(2): The Seleucid, Parthian and Sasanian Periods. Cambridge University Press. pp. 1130–1148.
- Livshits, Vladimir A. (1968). "The Khwarezmian Calendar and the Eras of Ancient Chorasmia" (PDF). Acta Antiqua Academiae Scientiarum Hungaricae. 16: 433–446.
- Lurje, Pavel B. (2018). "Some New Readings of Chorasmian Inscriptions on Silver Vessels and Their Relevance to the Chorasmian Era". Ancient Civilizations from Scythia to Siberia. 24 (1–2): 279–306. doi:10.1163/15700577-12341333.
- Rapoport, Yuri Aleksandrovich (2011) [1991]. "Chorasmia, I. Archeology and Pre-Islamic History". Encyclopædia Iranica. Vol. 5, Fasc. 5. pp. 511–516.
