= Sawashfan =

Afrighid ruler of Khwarezm (died 8th-century)

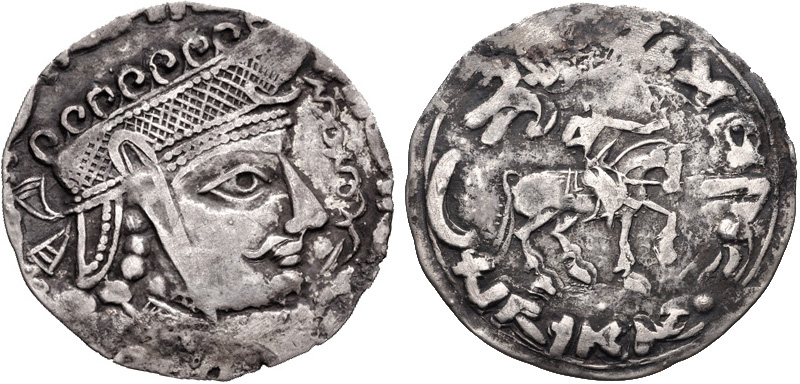
Silver coin of Sawashfan

Sawashfan (died 8th-century) was the ruler of the Afrighid dynasty of Khwarezm during the 8th century. He was the son and successor of Askajamuk II.

He is one of the few Afrighid rulers whose coins have been identified. The coin shows a bust of Sawashfan to the left, while it shows him on horseback to the right. Sawashfan is known in Chinese sources as Shao-she-fien, where he in 751 is reportedly said to have requested help from the Tang dynasty. Sawashfan was later succeeded by his grandson Azkajwar-Abdallah.

Preceded by Askajamuk II	Ruler of Khwarazm; 8th-century	Succeeded by Azkajwar-Abdallah
