= Chorasmian (Unicode block) =

- Range: U+10FB0..U+10FDF (48 code points)
- Plane: SMP
- Scripts: Chorasmian
- Assigned: 28 code points
- Unused: 20 reserved code points

Unicode version history
- 13.0 (2020): 28 (+28)

Unicode documentation
- Code chart ∣ Web page

Chorasmian is a Unicode block containing characters from the Chorasmian script, which was used for writing the Khwarezmian language in Transoxiana during the 8th century.

== Block ==
Chorasmian^{[1]}^{[2]} Official Unicode Consortium code chart (PDF)
	0	1	2	3	4	5	6	7	8	9	A	B	C	D	E	F
U+10FBx	𐾰	𐾱	𐾲	𐾳	𐾴	𐾵	𐾶	𐾷	𐾸	𐾹	𐾺	𐾻	𐾼	𐾽	𐾾	𐾿
U+10FCx	𐿀	𐿁	𐿂	𐿃	𐿄	𐿅	𐿆	𐿇	𐿈	𐿉	𐿊	𐿋				
U+10FDx																
Notes: 1. As of Unicode version 17.0; 2. Grey areas indicate non-assigned code points

== History ==
The following Unicode-related documents record the purpose and process of defining specific characters in the Chorasmian block:

Version	Final code points (Note: Proposed code points and characters names may differ from final code points and names)	Count	L2 ID	WG2 ID	Document
13.0	U+10FB0..10FCB	28	L2/17-054R		Pandey, Anshuman (2017-01-31), Proposal to encode the Khwarezmian script in Unicode
13.0	U+10FB0..10FCB	28	L2/17-255		Anderson, Deborah; Whistler, Ken; Pournader, Roozbeh; Moore, Lisa; Liang, Hai (2017-07-28), "19. Khwarezmian", Recommendations to UTC #152 July-August 2017 on Script Proposals
13.0	U+10FB0..10FCB	28	L2/18-010R		Pandey, Anshuman (2018-03-26), Proposal to encode the Khwarezmian script in Unicode
13.0	U+10FB0..10FCB	28	L2/18-039		Anderson, Deborah; Whistler, Ken; Pournader, Roozbeh; Moore, Lisa; Liang, Hai; Cook, Richard (2018-01-19), "13. Khwarezmian", Recommendations to UTC #154 January 2018 on Script Proposals
13.0	U+10FB0..10FCB	28	L2/18-168		Anderson, Deborah; Whistler, Ken; Pournader, Roozbeh; Moore, Lisa; Liang, Hai; Chapman, Chris; Cook, Richard (2018-04-28), "13. Khwarezmian", Recommendations to UTC #155 April-May 2018 on Script Proposals
13.0	U+10FB0..10FCB	28	L2/18-164R2	N5010	Pandey, Anshuman (2018-07-26), Proposal to encode the Chorasmian script in Unicode
13.0	U+10FB0..10FCB	28	L2/18-115		Moore, Lisa (2018-05-09), "D.9", UTC #155 Minutes
13.0	U+10FB0..10FCB	28	L2/18-241		Anderson, Deborah; et al. (2018-07-20), "8", Recommendations to UTC # 156 July 2018 on Script Proposals
13.0	U+10FB0..10FCB	28	L2/18-183		Moore, Lisa (2018-11-20), "D.9", UTC #156 Minutes
