= Muhammad ibn Eraq =

Muhammad ibn Eraq (died 10th century) was ruler of the Afrighid dynasty of Khwarazm. He was the son and successor of Eraq ibn Mansur.

During his reign, he was visited by the Arab traveler Ahmad ibn Fadlan. After that, no more is known about him; he was succeeded by his son Abu Sa'id Ahmad.

Preceded by Eraq ibn Mansur	Ruler of Khwarazm ???–10th-century	Succeeded by Abu Sa'id Ahmad
