= Arsamuh =

Arsamuh (also spelled Arthamukh) was the ruler of the Afrighid dynasty of Khwarezm, ruling during the time of the Islamic prophet Muhammad. Arsamuh was the successor of Buzgar, and was later succeeded by Sahr II.

Preceded by Buzgar	Ruler of Khwarazm somewhere between the 6th and/or the 7th-century	Succeeded by Sahr II
