= Ayaz-Kala =

Archaeological site in Uzbekistan

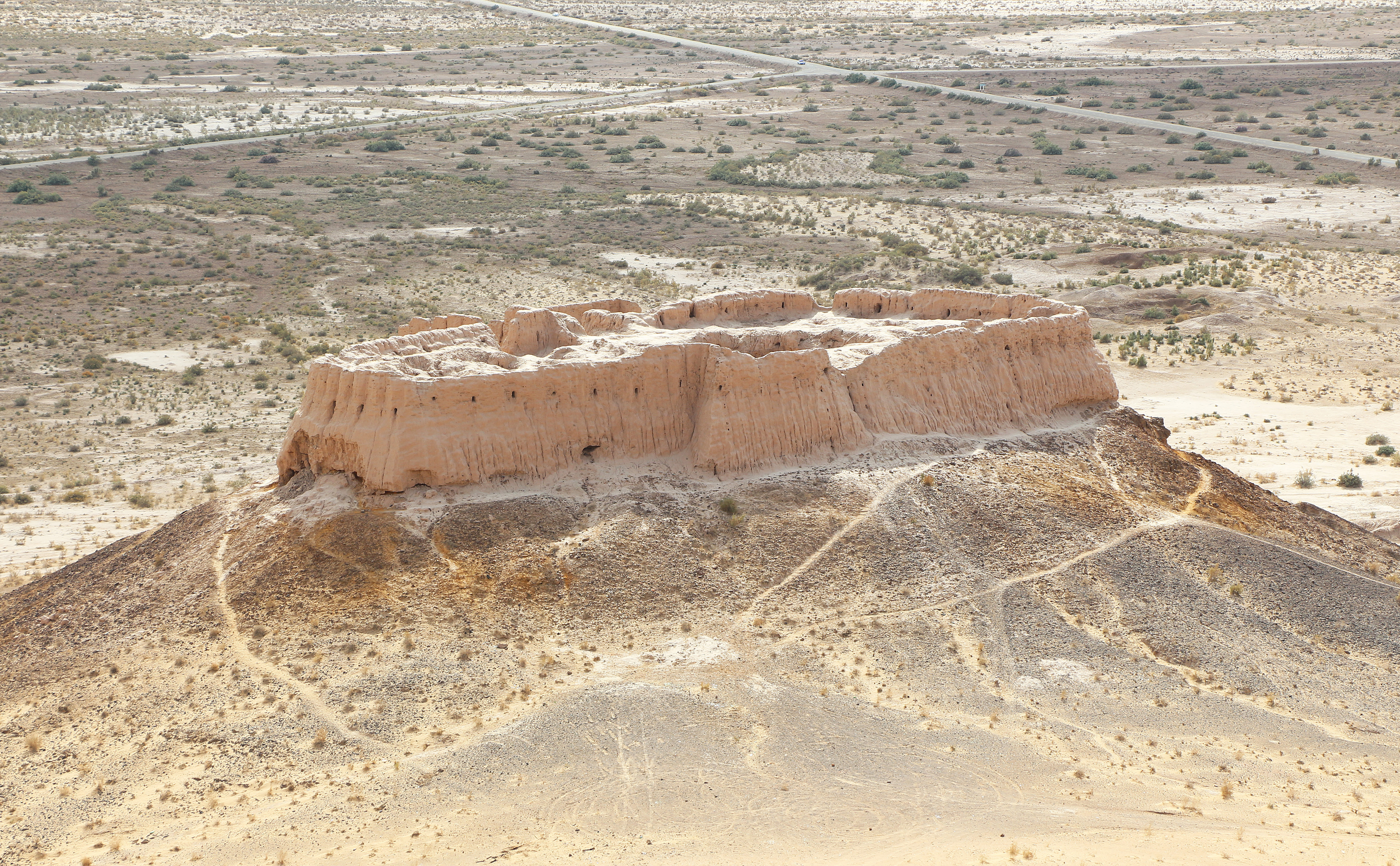
- The smaller fortress of Ayaz Kala 2 (6th to 8th century CE)

- Location within West and Central Asia Location within Uzbekistan Location within Karakalpakstan
- 42°0′35″N 61°1′38″E
- Type: Settlement
- Periods: Parthian, Sasanian
- Location: Karakalpakstan, Uzbekistan

Site notes
- Excavation dates: 1938
- Condition: Ruined

Ayaz-Kala is an archaeological site in Ellikqala District, Karakalpakstan, in northern Uzbekistan, built between the 4th century BCE and the 7th century CE. Situated on a hilltop overlooking the Kyzylkum Desert, the site encompasses the ruins of an ancient Khorezm fortress.

== History ==
The site consists of three fortresses which were built from the 4th century BCE to the 7th century CE. The fortresses were part of a series of forts at the edge of the Kyzylkum Desert, which provided defence against raids by nomads and the Saka of the Syr Darya delta. Part of Ayaz Kala was built in the second century by the Kushan Empire. The now-ruined fortress is speculated to have been built as part of a chain of border fortresses guarding the borders of the Kyzylkum Desert. In addition to the eroded remains of defensive works, the remnants of several residential structures have been uncovered at site.

=== Ayaz Kala 1 ===
Ayaz Kala 1 is a fortress dating back to end of the 4th or beginning of the 3rd century BCE. In this time Khorezm had become independent from Persia. Ayaz Kala 1 was part of a chain of fortresses protecting the agricultural settlements from attacks by nomads. The fortress is situated on the top of a hill, approximately 100 m (330 ft) high, providing wide views over the surrounding plains. The fortress is rectangular in plan with sides 182 and 152 m (597 and 499 ft) long. The main axis is oriented from south to north.

At the southern end of the axis is a square gateway, which is a typical element of frontier fortresses of Khorezm. The enemies' approach lies parallel to the south east walls and invaders were vulnerable to attack from above. A massive gateway defended by two rectangular towers leads into a small rectangular chamber. This chamber was overlooked on all sides by high walls from which bowmen could shoot at the enemy in case the first gate was breached.

The enclosure of the fortress consists of an inner and outer wall with a vaulted corridor between them, about 2 m wide. The walls continue above the vaults, forming a protected rampart walk. The walls are up to 10 m (33 ft) high and at their base 2.2 to 2.4 m thick. The walls are reinforced in the 3rd century BCE by 45 watchtowers in half elliptical form, at a distance from each other of 11.5 m at the northern and of 14 m at the eastern and western sides.

The fortress seems to have been in use until the 1st century CE and might have served as a refuge for the locals up to the early medieval period.

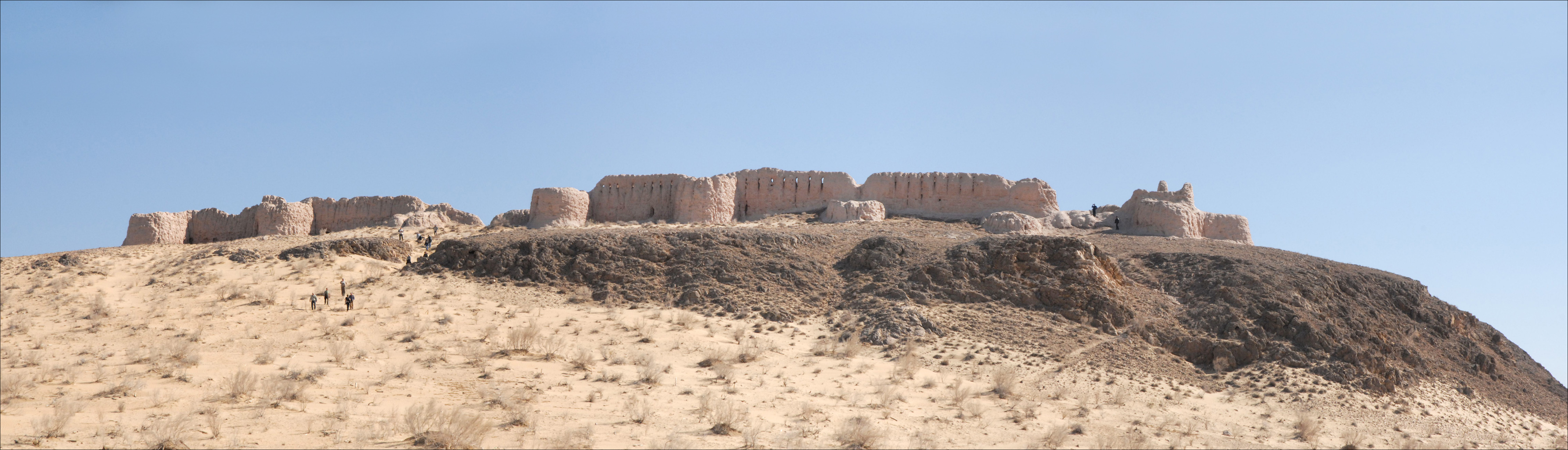
Ayaz Kala 1

=== Ayaz Kala 2 ===
Ayaz Kala 2

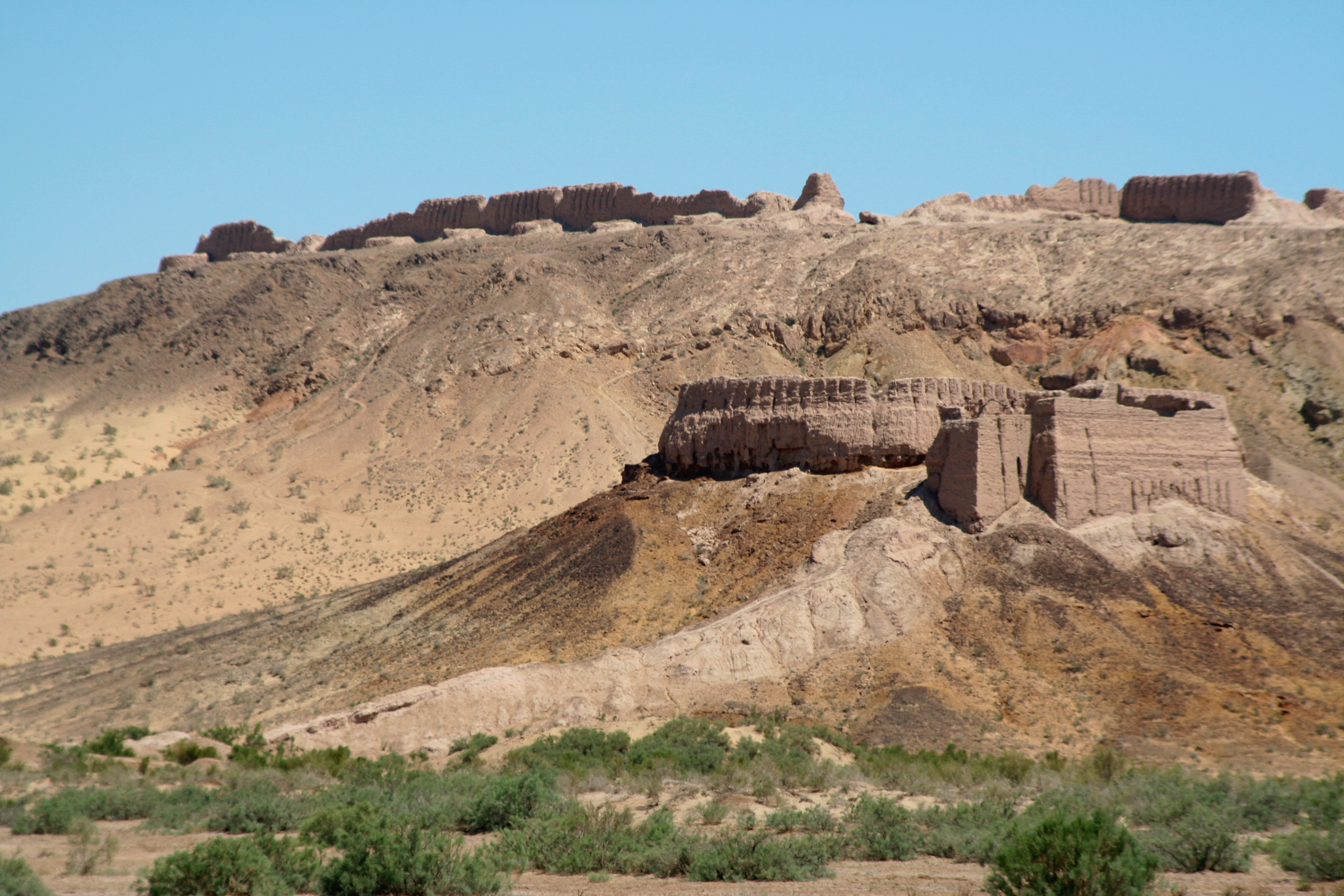
Ayaz Kala 2, in front and below Ayaz Kala 1.

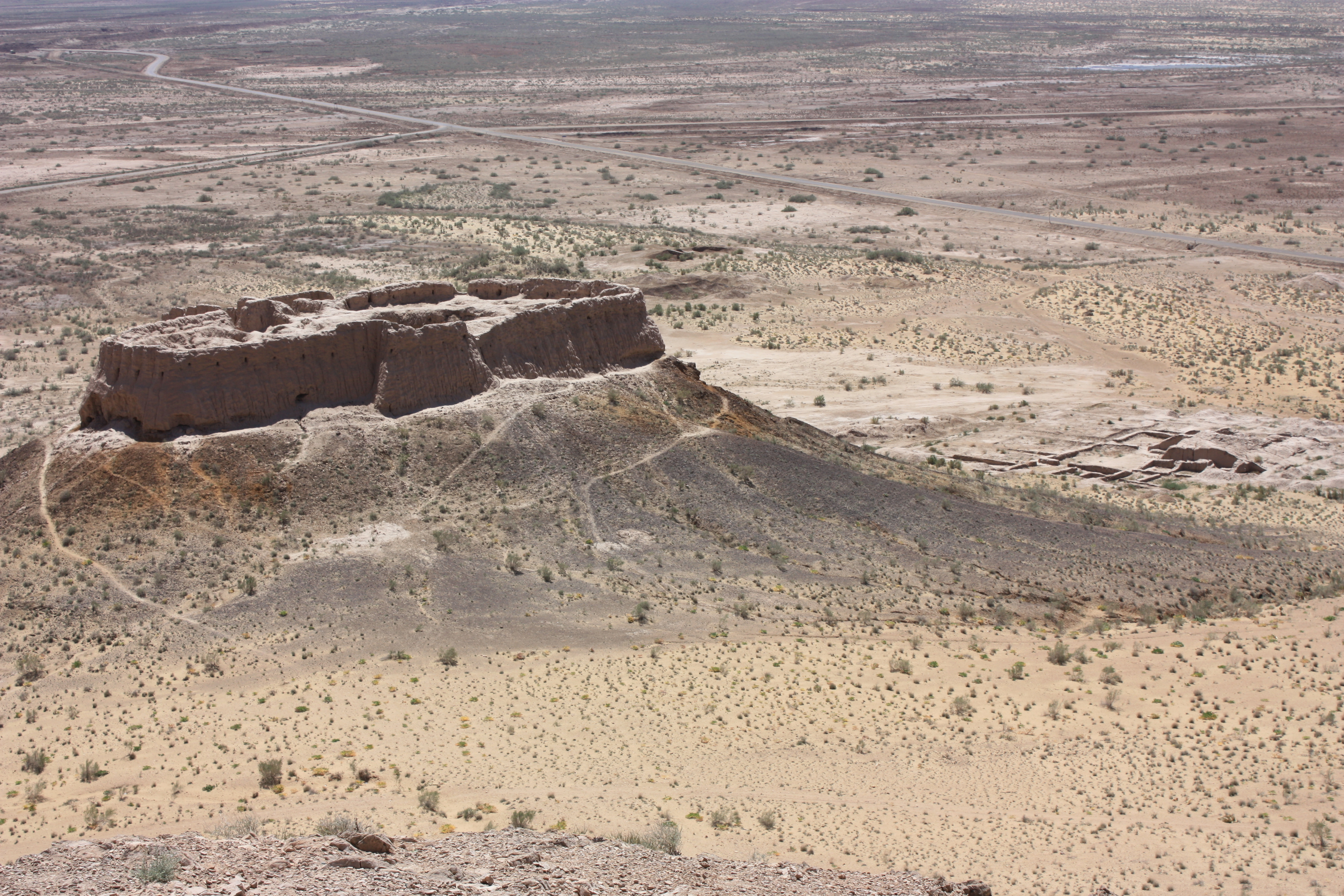
Ayaz Kala 2 seen from Ayaz Kala 1.

Ayaz Kala 2 is a feudal fortress dating from the 6th to 8th century CE, in the Afrighid period. It was built on the top of a conical hill, about 40 m high, situated south west of Ayaz Kala 1. The fortress consists of the entry on the south western side and the main building which is oval in shape.

In the 6th to 8th century CE Khorezm was ruled by the Afrighid dynasty of Khorezmshahs. At this time the "dihqans", a new class of feudal landowners came into existence. They were descendants of the ancient nobility, courtiers or soldiers who had been rewarded for military services. Their agricultural estates were called "rustaq". They lived in "donjons", small square forts surrounded by a defensive wall. An important example called Yakke Parsan is situated 10 km south of Ayaz Kala.

Ayaz Kala 2 was built of rectangular mud bricks on a foundation of "paksha" (cob). The upper parts of the outer walls were crenulated. The building was fortified with low battlements and a row of arrow slits. Ayaz Kala 2 had a 50 m-long (160 ft) sloping man-made staircase on the southern side of the fort.

The main building is considered as a palace with residential quarters, ceremonial halls with ceilings supported by multiple columns and a fire temple, luxuriously decorated with wall paintings. This building seems to have been the residence of a feudal lord loyal to the Khorezmshah. The building was built in the 4th century CE and destroyed by two separate fires. The palace was in use during the 6th and 7th cent CE as a domestic dwelling. A vast urban complex of buildings was located at the feet of the fortress.

=== Ayaz Kala 3 ===
Ayaz Kala 3 is a fortified garrison dating from the 1st to 2nd century CE. The monumental building in the north east corner may have been founded in the 5th or 4th century BCE. The site covers an area of about 5 hectares.

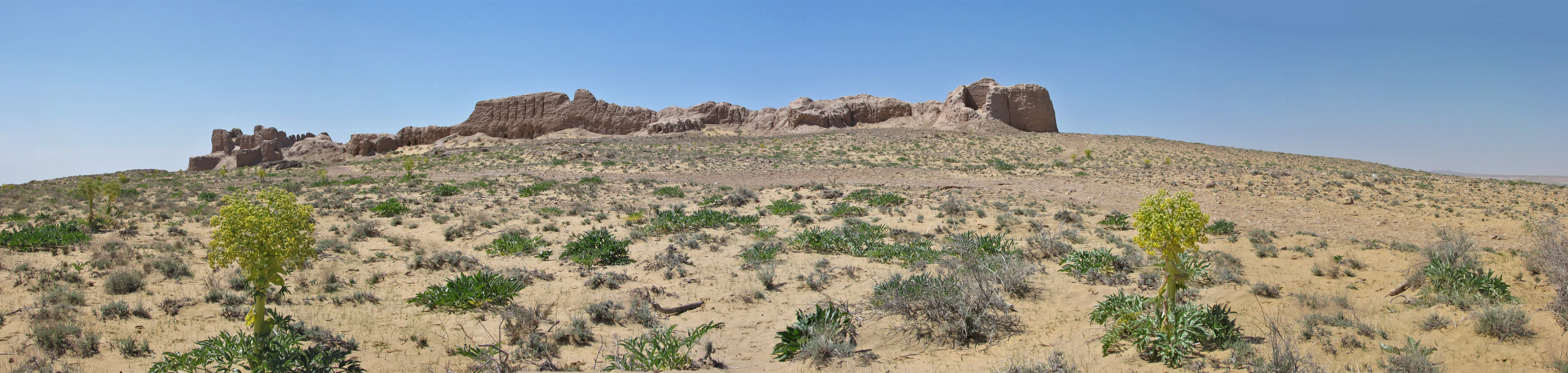
Fortress of Ayaz Kala 3.

The enclosure wall is one of the largest fortresses in Karalpakstan. Ayaz Kala 3 is 66 percent larger than Ayaz Kala 1. It has the shape of a parallelogram with sides 260 m and 180 m long. The structure of the external wall is similar to Ayaz Kala 1. The external walls are 7.5 m wide. The circular watchtowers have a size of 8 m. The fortress was built with paksha in the lower parts and masonry in the upper parts. made of adobe blocks. The entrance to the fortress on the western side consists of an S-Shaped extension of the external wall. The interior of the fortress is empty.

The monumental buildings in the north east corner cover an area of 2,400 m^{2}. The building has 40 rooms divided into 4 groups by 2 central corridors. There are remains of a narrow corridor on three sides of the buildings. The southern and eastern walls have square watchtowers, about 2×2 metres.

It is supposed that Ayaz Kala 3 was used in Kushan times as a garrison or as a ruler's residence and refuge for the local farming population and that a small force used Ayaz Kala 1 as a lookout post.

== Structural details ==
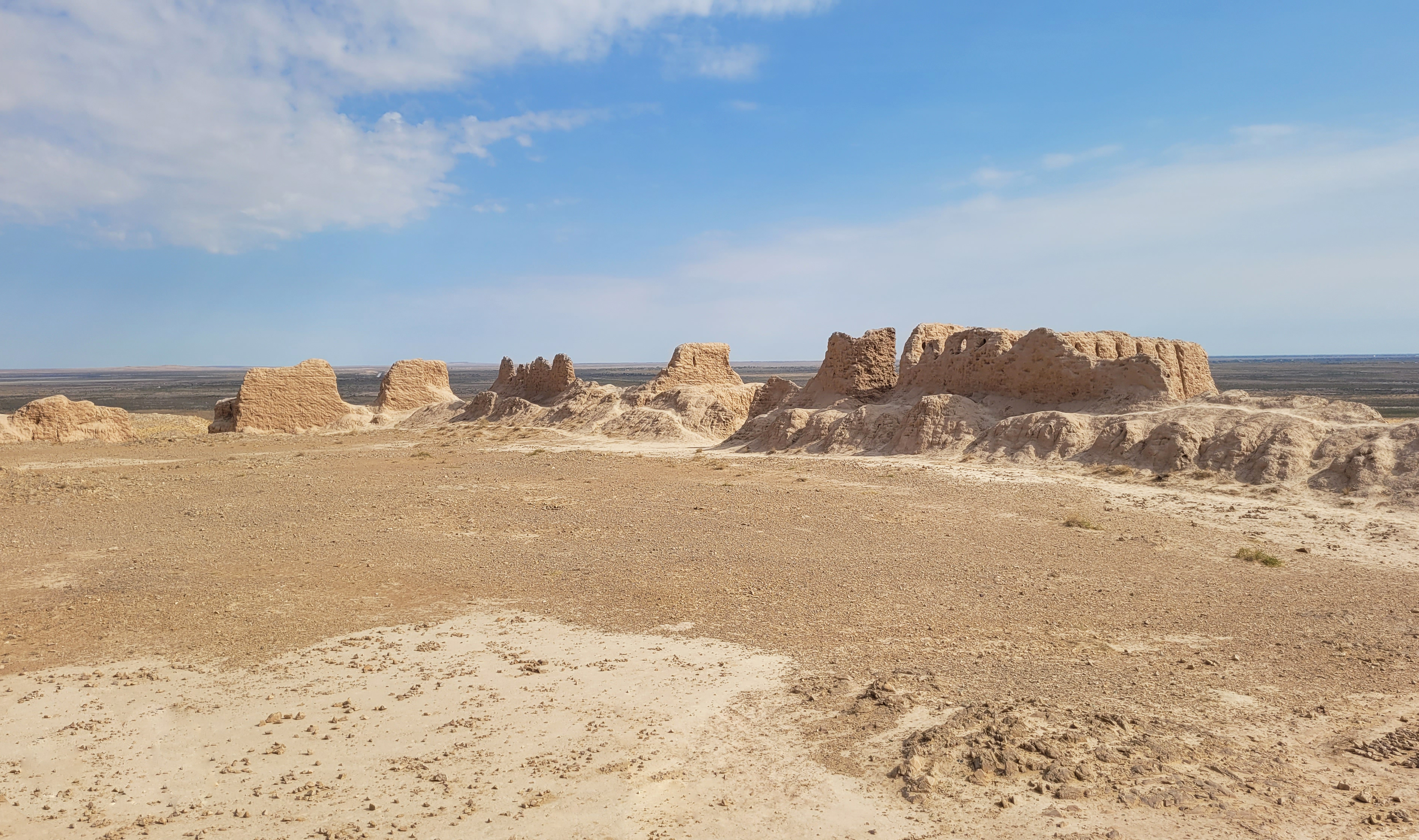
Ruins of Ayaz-Kala 1

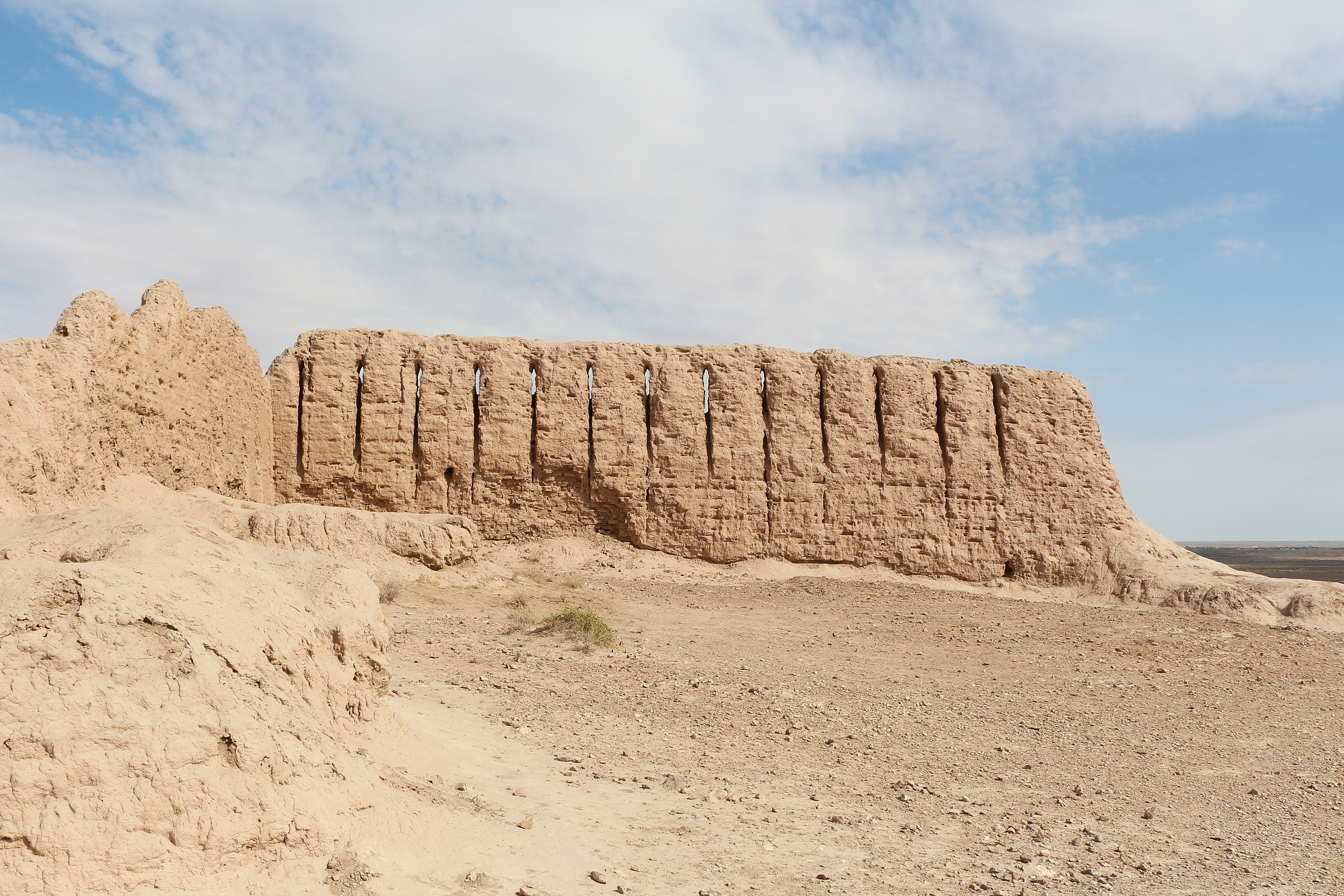
Ruins of Ayaz-Kala 1

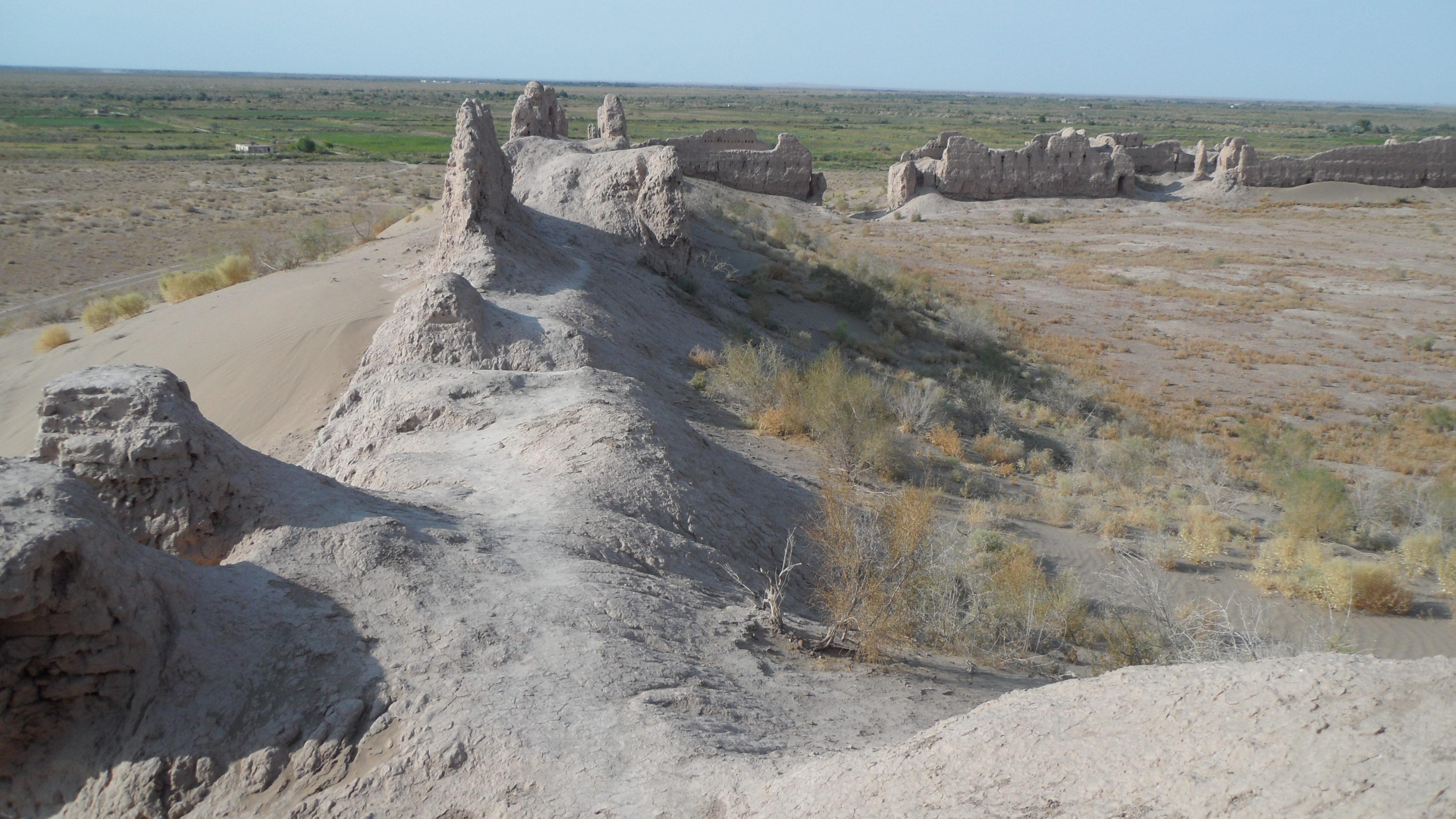
Ruins of Ayaz-Kala 1

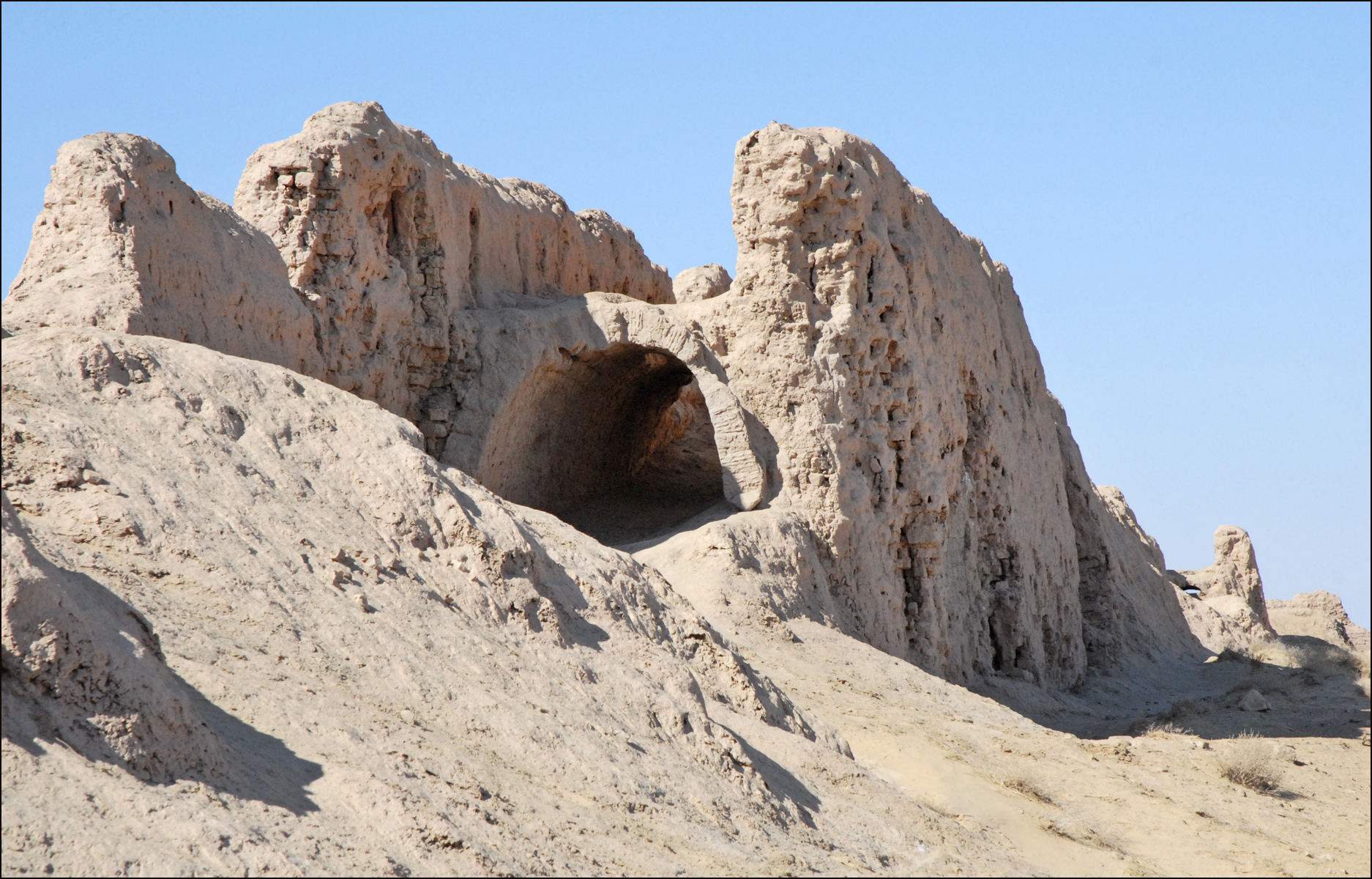
Ruins of Ayaz-Kala 1

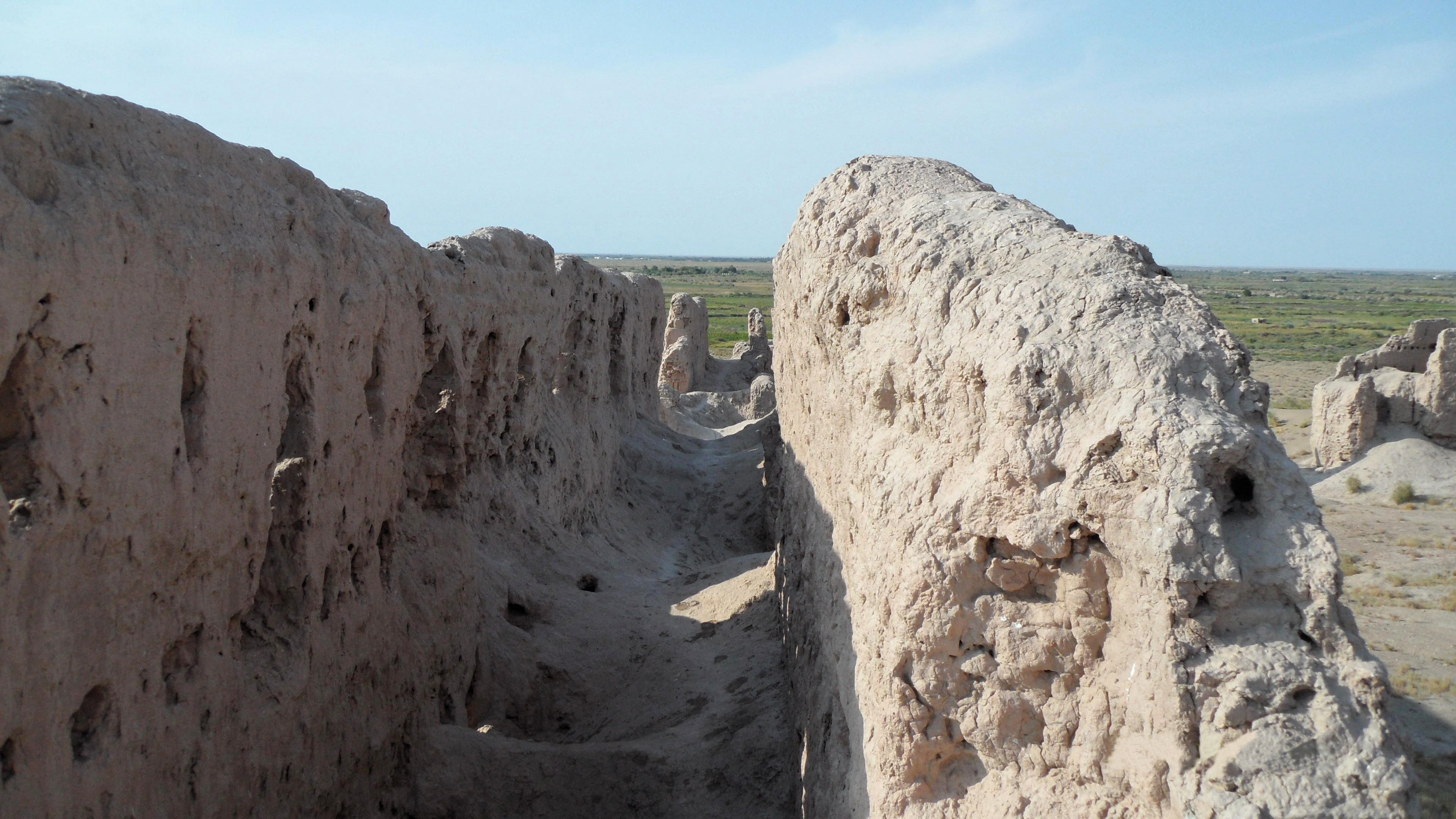
Ruins of Ayaz-Kala 1

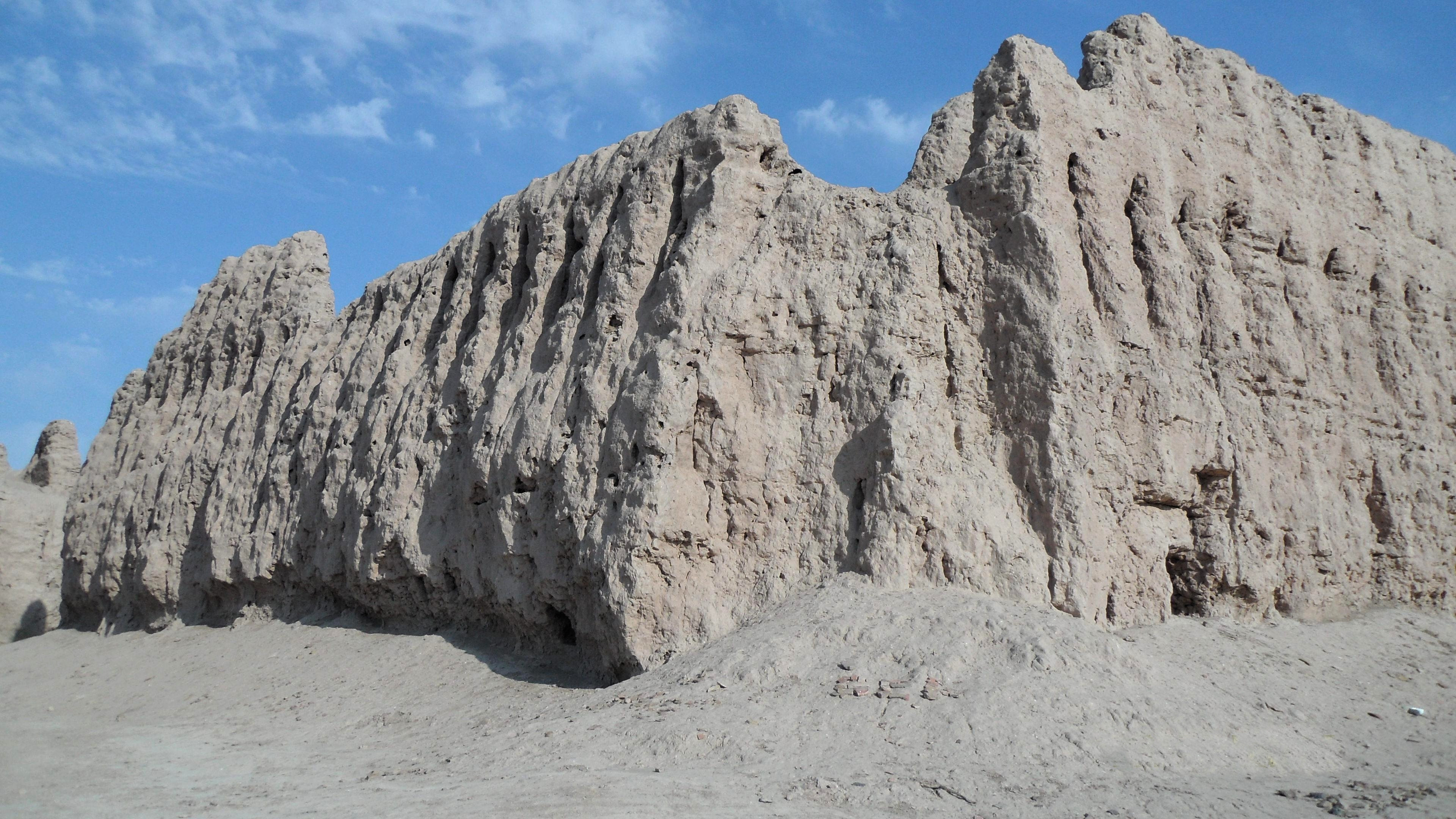
Ruins of Ayaz-Kala 3

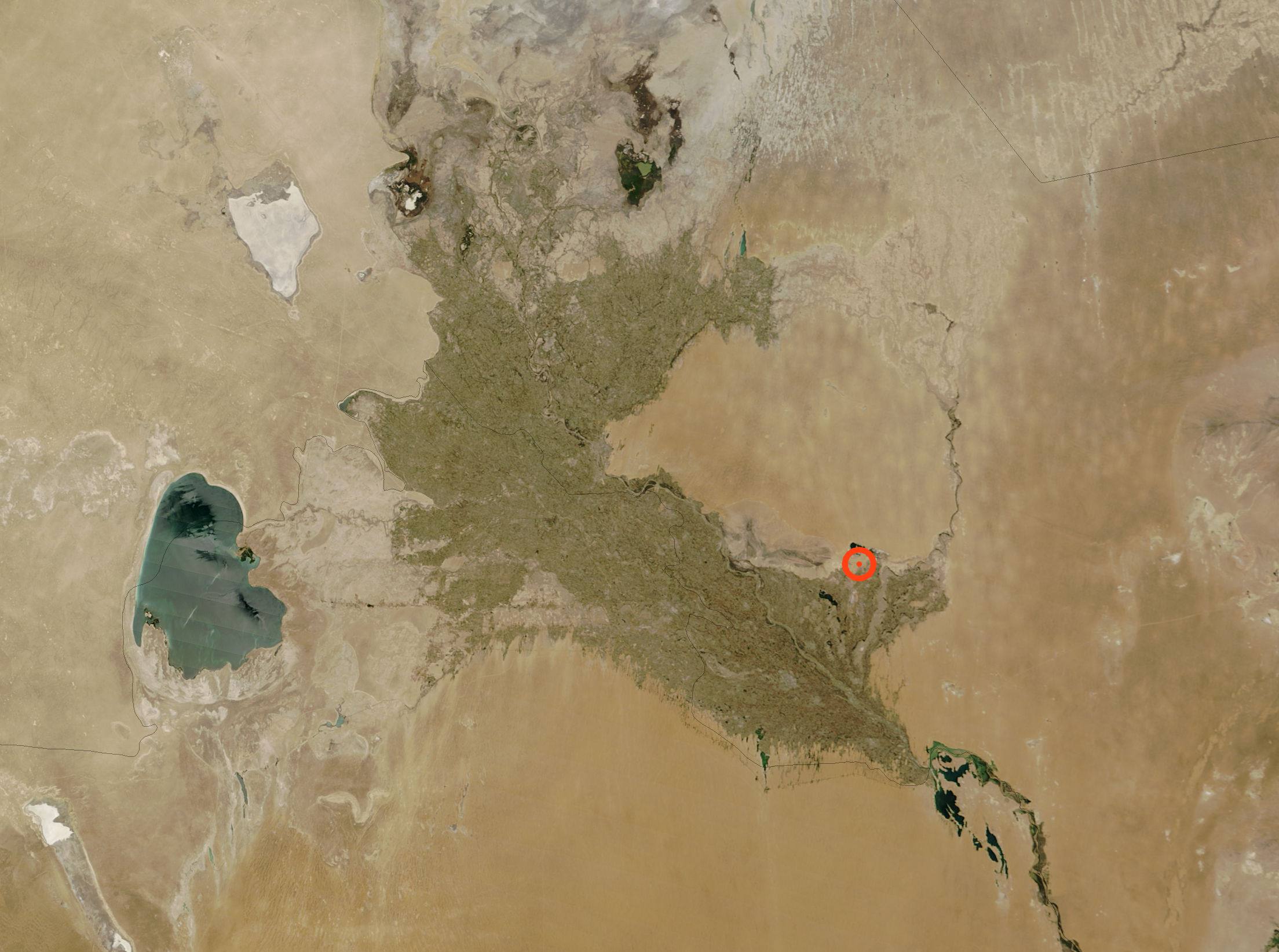
Chorasmian oasis, Ayaz-Kala fortress
