= Biwarsar I =

Afrighid ruler of Khwarazm (r. 4th century)

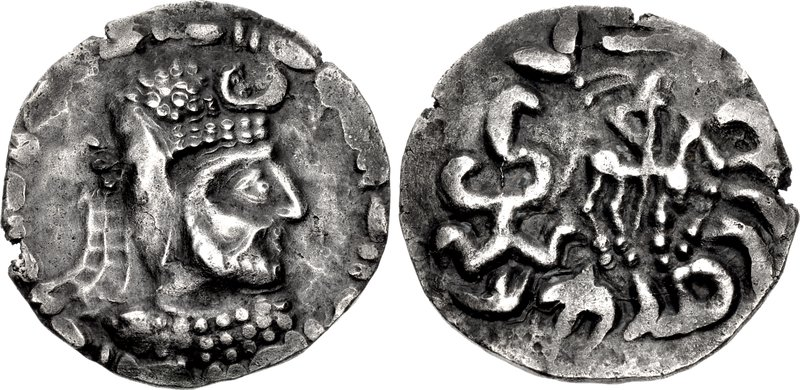
Coin of Biwarsar I

Biwarsar I was the Afrighid ruler of Khwarazm in the third quarter of the 4th century. He was the predecessor of Baghra, and was succeeded by Kawi.

== Sources ==
- Fedorov, Michael; Kuznetsov, Andrew (2011). "On some previously unknown Khwarazmian drachms and the names of rulers on them". Iran: Journal of the British Institute of Persian Studies. 49. Taylor & Francis: 79–88. JSTOR 41431230.

Preceded by Baghra	Ruler of Khwarazm; Third quarter of the 4th-century	Succeeded by Kawi
