= Walter Bruno Henning =

German linguist (1908–1967)

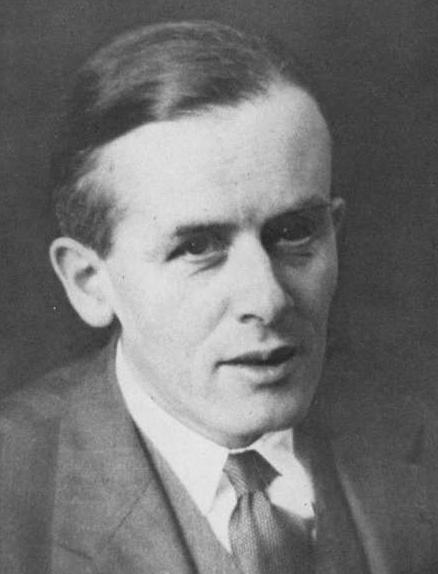
- Born: August 26, 1908; Ragnit, East Prussia
- Died: January 8, 1967 (aged 58); Berkeley, California, USA
- Occupations: Philologist, linguist
- Known for: Contributions to the study of Middle Iranian languages

Walter Bruno Henning (August 26, 1908 – January 8, 1967) was a German scholar of Middle Iranian languages and literature, especially of the corpus discovered by the Turpan expeditions of the early 20th century.

== Biography ==
Walter Henning was born in the ancient fortress town of Ragnit, East Prussia (now Neman, Russia), but grew up in Köslin in Pomerania on the Baltic Sea.

Henning initially attended the University of Göttingen to study mathematics, and although he would soon choose to study Iranian languages instead, he would maintain an interest in mathematics for the rest of his life. At Göttingen, Henning was—together with Paul Thieme, Walther Hinz, Kaj Barr and Hans Jakob Polotsky—among the last group of students of Friedrich Carl Andreas, chairman of the faculty for Western Asian languages (German: Lehrstuhl für Westasiatische Sprachen), acknowledged authority on Middle Iranian literature and guiding force behind the analysis of the Turfan manuscripts.

In 1931, Henning received a Ph.D. summa cum laude for his study of the Middle Iranian verb as it appeared in the Turfan collection. In 1932, the Prussian Academy of Sciences appointed Henning editor of the Manichaean manuscripts of that collection, for which Henning shifted to Berlin.

Between 1932 and 1936, Henning completed several studies that Andreas had begun, the results of which were published as the 3-volume Mitteliranische Manichaica aus Chinesisch-Türkestan. Independently of Andreas' Nachlass, Henning published Ein manichäisches Bet- und Beichtbuch, the first major publication of the difficult Sogdian language texts. In the same period, Henning also made several significant contributions to the understanding of the history of Manichaeism.

While in Berlin, Henning became engaged to marry Maria Polotzky, the sister of Hans Jakob Polotzky, his colleague from student days. Marriage between non-Jews and Jews was dangerous in Nazi Germany, so in 1936 he accepted an invitation to succeed Harold Walter Bailey as the Parsee Community's Lecturer in Iranian Studies at the School of Oriental Studies, London. With the permission of the Prussian Academy, Henning continued his research there using photographs of the Turfan manuscripts. He and Maria were married in 1937 in London.

In 1939, shortly before the outbreak of World War II, he was appointed Senior Lecturer at the School of Oriental Studies. In 1940, having not yet acquired British citizenship and with the threat of a German invasion looming, Henning was interned as an enemy alien on the Isle of Man. It was there that he completed his Sogdica. In poor health, he was released a year later, and spent the remainder of the war teaching and studying at Christ's College, Cambridge, where the School of Oriental and African Studies (as the School of Oriental Studies was by then known) had been temporarily relocated.

Shortly after the war, in 1946, Henning spent a year as visiting professor of Indo-Iranian languages at Columbia University, in New York City. Upon his return, he was appointed Reader in Central-Asian Studies at the University of London, and shortly thereafter, Professor.

In 1949, at the behest of the Parsi community's Rattanbai Katrak Foundation, he delivered his famous "Zoroaster, Politician or Witch-Doctor?" series of lectures at the University of Oxford. These lectures, which contributed to the dismissal of the respective theories of Henrik Samuel Nyberg and Ernst Herzfeld (both of whom had written books that misrepresented hypotheses as facts) and the eventual isolation of both, realigned the tone and direction of Iranian Studies towards scientific research, and away from extravagant speculation that had beset the field in the previous decades.

In 1950, and at the invitation of the Iranian government, Henning spent several months doing field-work in Iran, where he was the first to make several tracings of Pahlavi rock-face inscriptions at (otherwise) inaccessible locations. His tracings and their translations were not published until after his death.

In 1954, Henning was appointed the first Chairman of the Executive Council of the Corpus Inscriptionum Iranicarum, and in the same year, a Fellow of the British Academy. Henning spent early 1956 at the Institute for Advanced Study in Princeton, New Jersey, where he furthered his study of the Khwarezmian language.

In 1958, Henning was appointed Head of the Department of Languages and Cultures of Near and Middle East at SOAS, University of London (he had been acting Head from the year before). He found the administrative duties irksome and the damp of English winters tiresome, so in September 1961 he accepted a position as Professor of Iranian Studies at the University of California, Berkeley.

In 1967, Henning obtained a leave of absence to complete his dictionary of the Khwarezmian language, which he had been intermittently working on for 30 years. In December 1966, Henning fell and broke his leg. The accident precipitated pulmonary edema, from which he died on January 8, 1967. He was survived by his wife and daughter.

== Contributions ==
Henning published over 70 articles in the course of his career. The majority were related to texts of the Middle Iranian era, in particular to Sogdian, but also in Bactrian, Khwarezmian, Parthian and Middle Persian. His interest in the history of Manichaeaism also led him to work on the Uyghur language and Chinese. His identification of the trilingual inscriptions on the Ka'ba-ye Zartosht as having been those of Shapur I were a significant contribution to Sasanian history.

Invaluable to the understanding of Middle Iranian are Henning's studies into the non-Iranian languages and scripts of the Middle Indo-Aryan languages, Elamite and Imperial Aramaic. Several works that were in progress when Henning died—including his Khwarezmian dictionary and his etymological dictionary of Middle Persian—remain unpublished.

== Publications ==
- Zoroaster (London: Cumberlege, 1951).
- Mitteliranisch, in Spuler et al. Handbuch der Orientalistik I Bd. IV I, 1958 remains the authoritative guide to Middle Iranian languages and writing systems.

== Sources ==
- Boyce, Mary (1967), "Obituary: Walter Bruno Henning", Bulletin of the School of Oriental and African Studies, 30 (3): 781–785, doi:10.1017/S0041977X00133014.
