= Azkajwar-Abdallah =

- Khwarazmshah
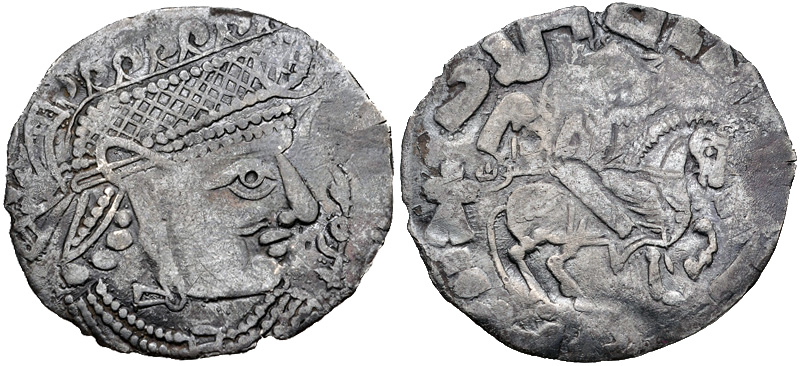
- Coin of Azkawjar-Abdallah

King of Khwarazm
- Reign: after 762/before 787 – 820s
- Predecessor: Sawashfan
- Successor: Mansur
- Died: 820s
- Religion: Zoroastrianism, later Islam

Azkajwar-Abdallah was the Afrighid king of Khwarazm from the late 8th till the early 9th century. The precise date of his regnal period is uncertain. He ascended as king after 762, but not later than 783 or 787. He was the grandson of his predecessor Sawashfan. Azkajwar-Abdallah is notable for converting to Islam, taking the Muslim name of Abdallah. He was also the last Afrighid king to have coins minted in pre-Islamic style. The latest discovered coin of Azkajwar-Abdallah cites his overlord the Tahirid dynast Tahir ibn Husayn, who governed Khurasan on behalf of the Abbasid Caliphate in 821–822. Azkajwar-Abdallah was succeeded by Mansur.

== Sources ==
- Bosworth, C. E. (1984). "ĀL-E AFRĪḠ". Encyclopaedia Iranica, Vol. I, Fasc. 7. pp. 743–745.
- Fedorov, Michael; Kuznetsov, Andrew (2011). "On some previously unknown Khwarazmian drachms and the names of rulers on them". Iran: Journal of the British Institute of Persian Studies. 49. Taylor & Francis: 79–88. JSTOR 41431230.

Preceded by Sawashfan	King of Khwarazm; 762/787–820s	Succeeded by Mansur
