= Askajamuk II =

Askajamuk II (died 8th-century) was the ruler of the Afrighid dynasty of Khwarezm from 712 to an unknown date. He was the relative and successor of Khusrau.

He was the son of king Azkajwar II, who is probably identical with the Afrighid ruler Jigan or Chigan, who became a vassal of the Umayyads in 712. During the same year, an anti-Umayyads rebellion broke out in Khwarazm, which resulted in the death of Azkajwar II. Another Afrighid prince named Khusrau was shortly after put on the throne. However, the Umayyads then invaded Khwarazm and overthrew the latter and made Askajamuk II the new ruler of the kingdom. Askajamuk II was later succeeded by his son Sawashfan.

Preceded by Khusrau	Ruler of Khwarazm; 712–8th-century	Succeeded by Sawashfan
