= Khusrau of Khwarezm =

Afrighid ruler of Khwarezm (d. 712)

Khusrau (died 712) was the ruler of the Afrighid dynasty of Khwarezm briefly in 712. He was the relative and successor of Azkajwar II.

Nothing is known about the early life of Khusrau, although he was probably a member of the Afrighid family. In 712, an anti-Umayyads rebellion broke out in Khwarazm, which resulted in the overthrow and death of king Azkajwar II, who had agreed to become a vassal of the Umayyads. Khusrau claimed the throne. However, the Umayyads invaded Khwarazm and ravaged the region, brutally massacring the rebels and burning several important objects of the Khwarazmian culture. Khusrau was killed and was replaced by Azkajwar's son Askajamuk II as the new ruler of the kingdom.

Preceded by Azkajwar II	Ruler of Khwarazm; 712	Succeeded by Askajamuk II
