= Beruniy District =

Coordinates: 41.69°N 60.75°E

- District
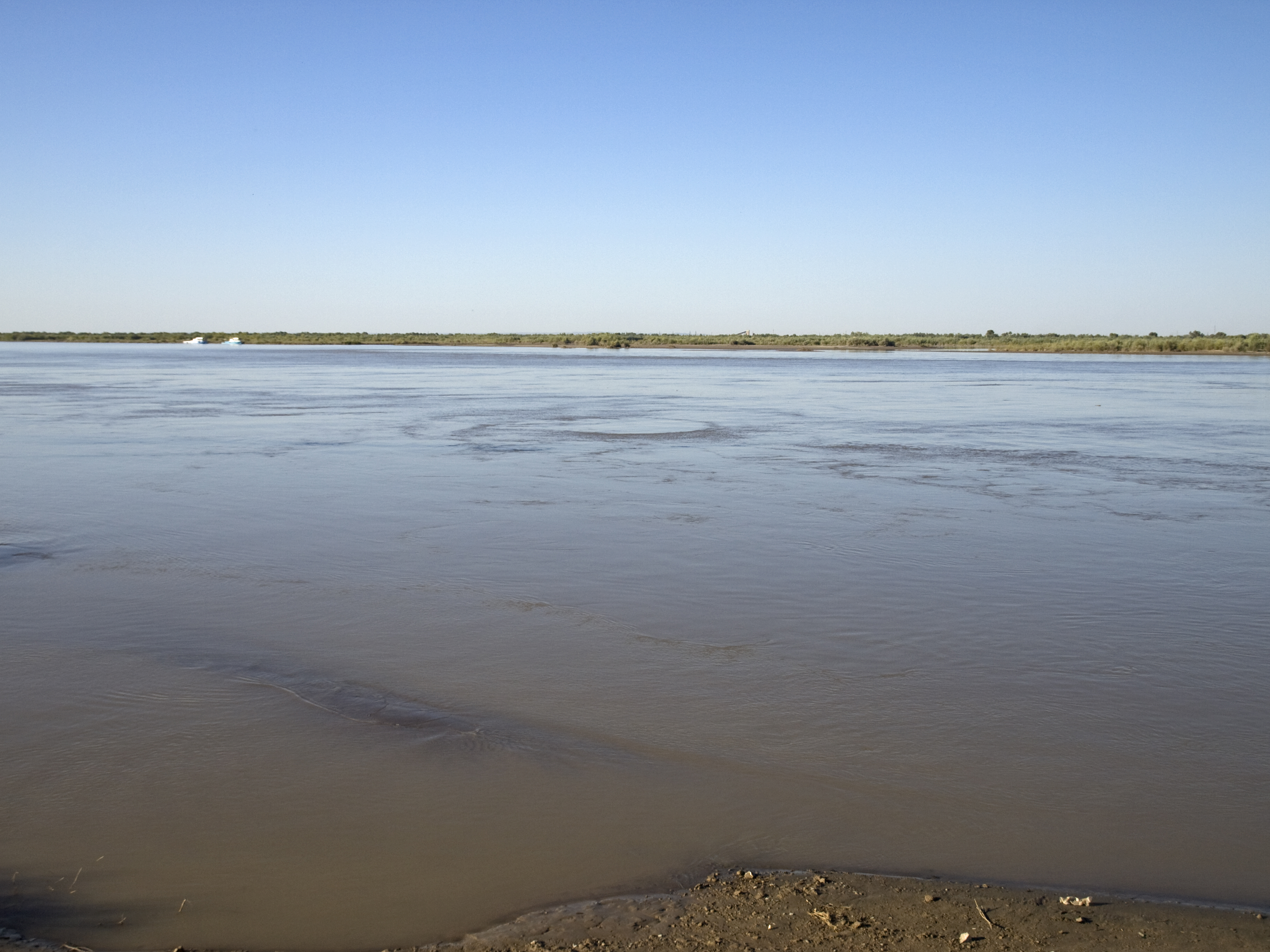
- The right bank of Amu Darya in Beruniy District

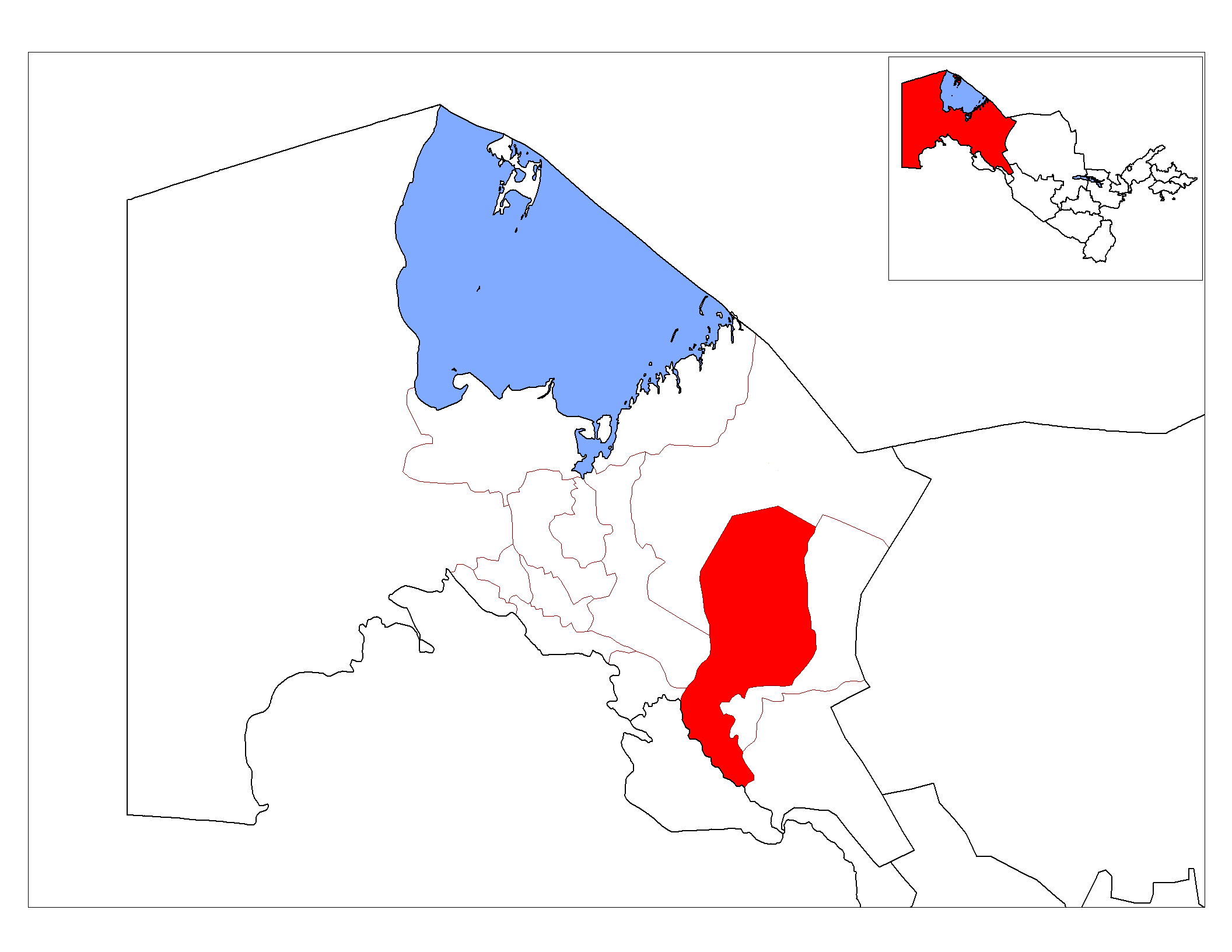
- Country: Uzbekistan
- Autonomous Republic: Karakalpakstan
- Capital: Beruniy

Area
  - Total: 3,950 km^{2} (1,530 sq mi)

Population (2022)
  - Total: 197,400
  - Density: 50.0/km^{2} (129/sq mi)
- Time zone: UTC+5 (UZT)

Beruniy District (Uzbek: Beruniy tumani, Беруний тумани; Karakalpak: Beruniy rayonı) is a district of Karakalpakstan in Uzbekistan whose capital is the only city, Beruniy. Its area is 3,950 km^{2} (1,530 sq mi) and it had 197,400 inhabitants in 2022.

Apart from Beruniy, there are one urban-type settlement (Bulish) and 13 village councils.
