= Khwarezmian language =

Extinct Eastern Iranian language of Central Asia

Khwārezmian
- Chorasmian
- 𐾸𐾲𐾰𐾻 𐾰𐾺 𐾹𐾶𐾰𐿂𐾺𐾸𐾽 زڨاک ای خوارزم
- Native to: Khwarezm
- Region: Central Asia
- Era: 550 BCE – 1200 CE
- Language family: Indo-European: Indo-Iranian; Iranian; Northeastern; Sogdo-Bactrian; Khwārezmian
- Writing system: Khwarezmian script, Arabic script

Language codes
- ISO 639-3: xco
- Glottolog: khwa1238

Khwārezmian (Khwarezmian: زڨاک ای خوارزم zəβāg ī xwārazm; also transliterated Khwarazmian, Chorasmian, Khorezmian) is an extinct Eastern Iranian language closely related to Sogdian. The language was spoken in the area of Khwarezm (Chorasmia), centered in the lower Amu Darya south of the Aral Sea (the northern part of the modern Republic of Uzbekistan and the adjacent areas of Kazakhstan and Turkmenistan).

Knowledge of Khwarezmian is limited to its Middle Iranian stage and, as with Sogdian, little is known of its ancient form. Based on the writings of Khwarezmian scholars Al-Biruni and Zamakhshari, the language was in use at least until the 13th century, when it was gradually replaced by Persian for the most part, as well as several dialects of Turkic.

Sources of Khwarezmian include astronomical terms used by al-Biruni, Zamakhshari's Arabic–Persian–Khwarezmian dictionary and several legal texts that use Khwarezmian terms and quotations to explain certain legal concepts, most notably the Qunyat al-Munya of Muḫtār az-Zāhidī al-Ġazmīnī (d. 1259/60).

The noted scholar W. B. Henning was preparing a dictionary of Khwarezmian when he died, leaving it unfinished. A fragment of this dictionary was published posthumously by D.N. MacKenzie in 1971.

== Writing system ==
Khwarezmian Chorasmian
- Direction: Right-to-left script, vertical writing

ISO 15924
- ISO 15924: Chrs (109), Chorasmian

Unicode
- Unicode alias: Chorasmian
- Unicode range: U+10FB0–U+10FDF

Before the advance of Islam in Transoxiana (early 8th century), Khwarezmian was written in a script close to that of Sogdian and Pahlavi with its roots in the Imperial Aramaic script. From the few surviving examples of this script on coins and artifacts, it has been observed that written Khwarezmian included Aramaic logograms or ideograms, that is Aramaic words written to represent native spoken ones e.g. 𐿃𐾾𐿄 (ŠNT) for سرذ, sarδ, "year", 𐾾𐿁𐿃𐾺 (NPŠY) for خداک, xudāk, "self" and 𐾽𐾼𐾻𐾰 (MLK') for اى شاه, ī šah, "the king".

Letter	Transliteration	IPA	Corresponding letter in					
Letter	Transliteration	IPA	Phoenician	Imperial Aramaic	Inscriptional Parthian	Inscriptional Pahlavi	Old Sogdian	Sogdian
𐾰	ʾ	/a/	𐤀	𐡀	𐭀	𐭠	𐼀	𐼰
𐾲	[β]	/β/	𐤁	𐡁	𐭁	𐭡	𐼂	𐼱
𐾳	ɣ	/ɡ/	𐤂	𐡂	𐭂	𐭢	𐼄	𐼲
𐾴	d	/d/	𐤃	𐡃	𐭃	𐭣		
𐾵	h	/h/	𐤄	𐡄	𐭄	𐭤	𐼅	𐼳
𐾶	w	/w/	𐤅	𐡅	𐭅	𐭥	𐼇	𐼴
𐾸	z	/z/	𐤆	𐡆	𐭆	𐭦	𐼈	𐼵
𐾹	x	/x/	𐤇	𐡇	𐭇	𐭧	𐼉	𐼶
𐾺	y	/j/	𐤉	𐡉	𐭉	𐭩	𐼊	𐼷
𐾻	k	/k/	𐤊	𐡊	𐭊	𐭪	𐼋	𐼸
𐾼	[δ]	/ð/	𐤋	𐡋	𐭋	𐭫	𐼌	𐼹
𐾽	m	/m/	𐤌	𐡌	𐭌	𐭬	𐼍	𐼺
𐾾	n	/n/	𐤍	𐡍	𐭍	𐭭	𐼎	𐼻
𐾿	s	/s/	𐤎	𐡎	𐭎	𐭮	𐼑	𐼼
𐿀	ʿ	/ʕ/	𐤏	𐡏	𐭏		𐼒	𐼽
𐿁	p	/p/	𐤐	𐡐	𐭐	𐭯	𐼔	𐼾
𐿂	r	/r/	𐤓	𐡓	𐭓		𐼘	𐽀
𐿃	š	/ʃ/	𐤔	𐡔	𐭔	𐭱	𐼙	𐽁
𐿄	t	/t/	𐤕	𐡕	𐭕	𐭲	𐼚	𐽂

After the advance of Islam, Khwarezmian was written using an adapted version of the Perso-Arabic alphabet with a few extra signs to reflect specific Khwarezmian sounds, such as the letter څ which represents /ts/ and /dz/, as in the traditional Pashto orthography.

=== Unicode ===
Khwarezmian script was added to the Unicode Standard in March, 2020 with the release of version 13.0.

The Unicode block for Khwarezmian, called Chorasmian, is U+10FB0–U+10FDF:

Chorasmian^{[1]}^{[2]} Official Unicode Consortium code chart (PDF)
	0	1	2	3	4	5	6	7	8	9	A	B	C	D	E	F
U+10FBx	𐾰	𐾱	𐾲	𐾳	𐾴	𐾵	𐾶	𐾷	𐾸	𐾹	𐾺	𐾻	𐾼	𐾽	𐾾	𐾿
U+10FCx	𐿀	𐿁	𐿂	𐿃	𐿄	𐿅	𐿆	𐿇	𐿈	𐿉	𐿊	𐿋				
U+10FDx																
Notes 1.As of Unicode version 18.0 2.Grey areas indicate non-assigned code points

== See also ==
- Afrighids
- al-Khwārizmī
- Ancient Iranian peoples
- Al-Biruni
- Central Asia
- Iranian peoples
- Iranian languages
- Khwarezm
- Zoroastrianism
- Zamakhshari

== Literature ==
The Khwarezmian Glossary

- MacKenzie, D. N. (1970). "The Khwarezmian Glossary--I". Bulletin of the School of Oriental and African Studies. 33 (3). University of London: 540–59. doi:10.1017/S0041977X00126552. JSTOR 614521..
- MacKenzie, D. N. (1971). "The Khwarezmian Glossary--II". Bulletin of the School of Oriental and African Studies. 34 (1). University of London: 74–90. doi:10.1017/S0041977X00141588. JSTOR 614624..
- MacKenzie, D. N. (1971). "The Khwarezmian Glossary--III". Bulletin of the School of Oriental and African Studies. 34 (2). University of London: 314–30. doi:10.1017/S0041977X00129568. JSTOR 612694..
- MacKenzie, D. N. (1971). "The Khwarezmian Glossary--IV". Bulletin of the School of Oriental and African Studies. 34 (3). University of London: 521–37. doi:10.1017/S0041977X00128526. JSTOR 613900..
- MacKenzie, D. N. (1972). "The Khwarezmian Glossary--V". Bulletin of the School of Oriental and African Studies. 35 (1). University of London: 56–73. doi:10.1017/S0041977X00107360. JSTOR 612794..
