= Beruniy =

Beruniy Beruniy/Беруний
- City
- Location in Karakalpakstan Beruniy (Uzbekistan) Beruniy (West and Central Asia)
- Coordinates: 41°41′N 60°45′E
- Country: Uzbekistan
- Autonomous Republic: Karakalpakstan
- District: Beruniy District
- City status: 1962
- Named for: Al-Biruni

Population (2016)
  - Total: 55,900
- Time zone: UTC+5 (UZT)
  - Summer (DST): UTC+5 (not observed)
- Postal code: 230200
- Area code: +998 6157

Beruniy (Uzbek: Beruniy/Беруний; Karakalpak: Biruniy/Бируний; Russian: Беруни) is a city in the autonomous republic of Karakalpakstan, Uzbekistan. It is located on the northern bank of the Amu Darya near Uzbekistan's border with Turkmenistan. The city is the seat of Beruniy District. Historically, Beruniy was known as Kath (Persian: کاث; modern Uzbek: Kos) and served as the capital of Khwarazm during the Afrighid dynasty. In 1957, it was renamed "Beruniy" in honor of the medieval scholar and polymath Al-Biruni who was born here. Beruniy received city status in 1962.

Beruniy is an important industrial city in Karakalpakstan. It is home to an asphalt plant, a brick factory, a cotton plant, and a shoe factory. There are also many textile factories.

== History ==
Beruniy was the capital of Khwarezm from the time of the Afrighid dynasty around 305 CE, replacing the old capital of Toprak-Kala. At that time it was known as Kath (modern Uzbek: Kos). The city underwent many name changes, including Fil and Shobboz. In 1957, it was renamed Beruniy in honor of the Persian scholar and polymath Abū Rayḥān al-Bīrūnī who was born and raised in the town.

Beruniy received the status of a city in 1962. In 1969, Amu Darya River overflew its banks. As a result, several buildings in Beruniy were badly damaged. However, they were quickly repaired.

== Geography ==
Beruniy is located on the northern bank of the Amu Darya near Uzbekistan's border with Turkmenistan. By road it is 936 kilometres (582 mi) west of Tashkent and 55.6 kilometres (34.5 mi) northeast of Khiva.

=== Climate ===
Beruniy has a cold desert climate (Köppen climate classification BWk) with sharp continental influences. It has cold winters and hot summers. The average July temperature is 38 °C (100 °F). The mean temperature in January is −15 – −20 °C (5 – −4 °F).

Climate data for Beruniy
Month	Jan	Feb	Mar	Apr	May	Jun	Jul	Aug	Sep	Oct	Nov	Dec	Year
Mean daily maximum °C (°F)	2 (36)	6 (43)	13 (55)	22 (72)	29 (84)	35 (95)	36 (97)	35 (95)	28 (82)	21 (70)	11 (52)	4 (39)	20 (68)
Mean daily minimum °C (°F)	−7 (19)	−4 (25)	1 (34)	9 (48)	15 (59)	20 (68)	22 (72)	19 (66)	13 (55)	6 (43)	0 (32)	−5 (23)	7 (45)
Average precipitation mm (inches)	8.3 (0.33)	7.8 (0.31)	15.2 (0.60)	15.1 (0.59)	10.1 (0.40)	3.1 (0.12)	0.9 (0.04)	1.8 (0.07)	1.9 (0.07)	12.9 (0.51)	13 (0.5)	19.6 (0.77)	109.7 (4.31)

== Demographics ==
In 2016, Beruniy had a population of 55,900.

Historical population
Year	Pop.	±% p.a.
1968	18,000	—
1970	23,000	+13.04%
2000	47,300	+2.43%
2004	50,700	+1.75%
2016	55,900	+0.82%

== Economy ==
Beruniy is an important industrial city in Karakalpakstan. It is home to an asphalt plant, a brick factory, a cotton plant, and a shoe factory. There are also many textile factories.

== Education ==
Beruniy is home to 14 secondary schools, a music school and an athletic school.
