= Al-Biruni (disambiguation) =

Al-Biruni was a medieval polymath.

Al-Biruni may also refer to:

- Al-Beroni University in Afghanistan
- Al-Biruni (crater), a lunar crater
- 9936 Al-Biruni, an asteroid
- Biruni, the outer quarters in traditional Iranian architecture, as opposed to the andaruni
