= Virchow (crater) =

Crater on the Moon

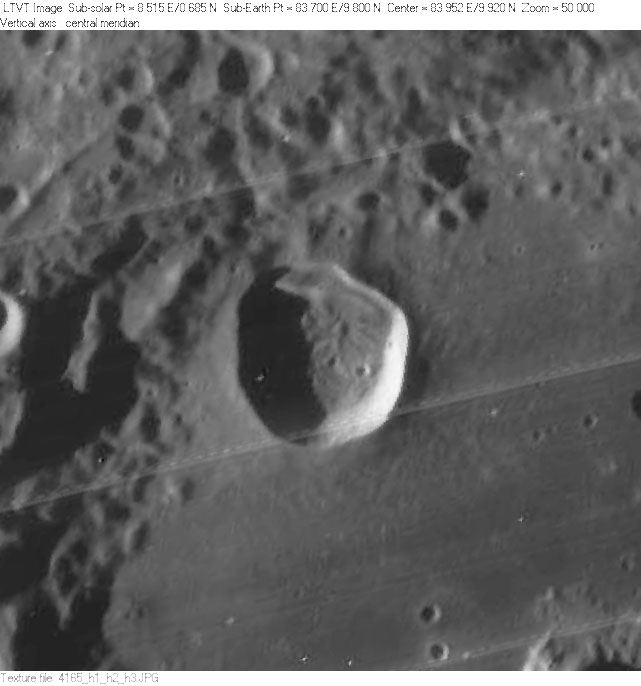
- Lunar Orbiter 4 image
- Coordinates: 9.8°N 83.7°E
- Diameter: 18.83 km (11.70 mi)
- Depth: 1.5 km (0.93 mi)
- Colongitude: 277° at sunrise
- Eponym: Rudolf L. K. Virchow

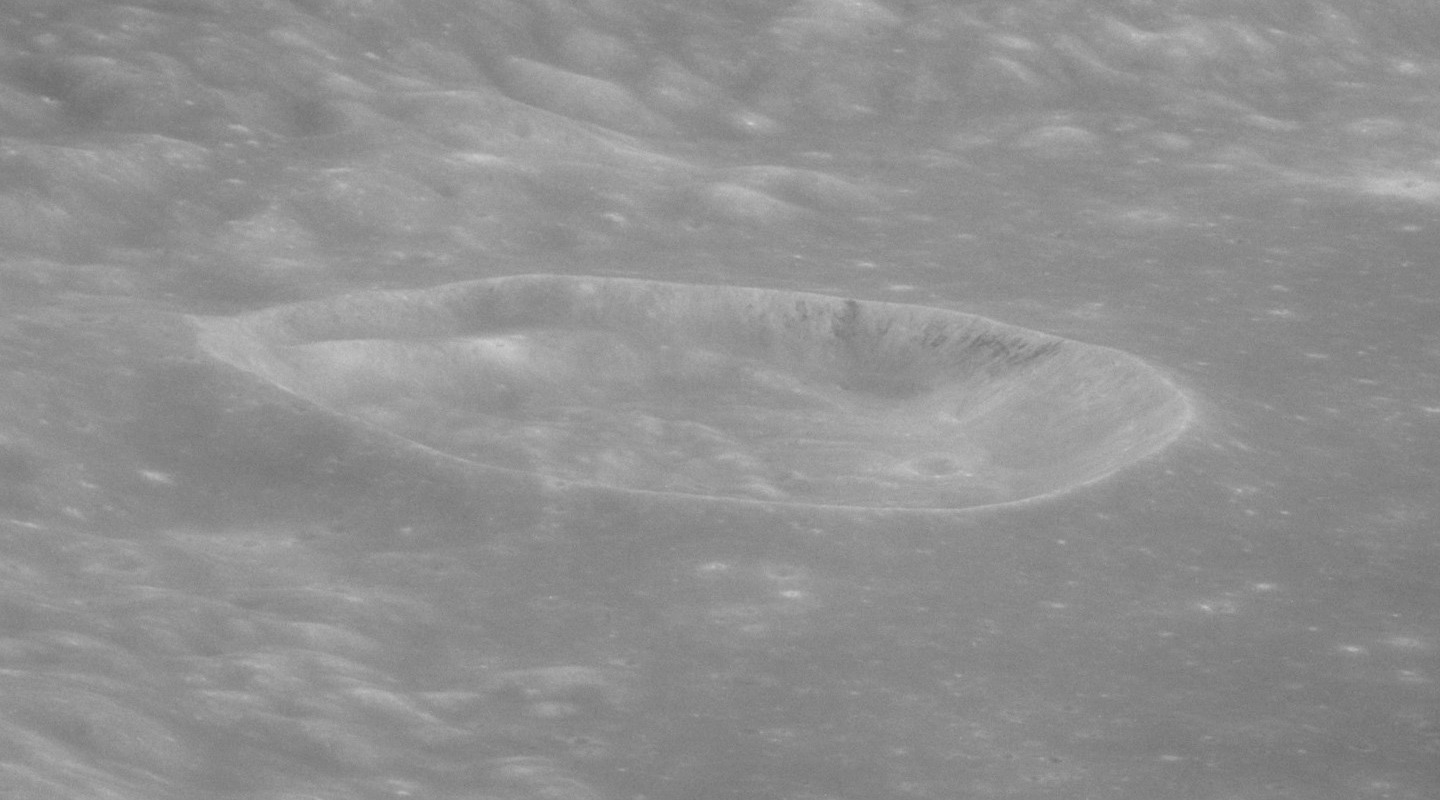
Oblique Apollo 11 image

Virchow is a small lunar impact crater that is located on the northwestern interior floor of the prominent crater Neper. The latter formation lies near the eastern limb of the Moon, along the southern edge of the Mare Marginis. From Earth, observation of this area is hindered due to foreshortening, as well as libration effects.

Virchow has a distorted shape, with a somewhat polygonal rim, particularly in the northern half. The northwestern rim protrudes outwards, giving the crater an asymmetrical appearance. This section of the rim just makes contact with the inner wall of Neper crater. The inner walls of Virchow are relatively narrow, and the interior floor is nearly level and almost featureless.

This crater was named after German doctor and pathologist Rudolf Virchow (1821-1902). Previously identified as Neper G, a satellite crater of Neper, the name Virchow was formally adopted as its designation by the International Astronomical Union in 1970.
