= Jansky (disambiguation) =

Jansky is a non-SI unit of electromagnetic flux.

Jansky or Janský may also refer to:

- 1932 Jansky, a main belt asteroid
- Jansky (crater), a lunar crater
- Jansky (surname), a Czech-language surname

== See also ==
- Jansky noise, cosmic radiation discovered by Karl Guthe Jansky
- Jansky–Bielschowsky disease
- Jánský Vrch Castle, is a castle in the Czech Republic
- Janská, a municipality and village in the Czech Republic
