= Ibn Yunus (disambiguation) =

Ibn Yunus (died 1009) was an Egyptian astronomer and mathematician.

Ibn Yunus may also refer to:

== People ==
- Al-Rabi ibn Yunus (died 785/6), minister of the Abbasid Caliphate
- Abu Bishr Matta ibn Yunus (died 940), Arab Christian philosopher
- Kamal al-Din ibn Yunus (1156–1242), Iraqi Muslim polymath

== Other ==
- Ibn Yunus (crater), a lunar impact crater on the far side of the Moon
