= Jansky (surname) =

Jánský (less commonly spelled Janský) is a Czech-language surname. Notable people with the surname include:

- Peter Jánský (born 1985), Czech hockey player
- Jan Janský (1873–1921), Czech serologist, neurologist and psychiatrist, credited with the first classification of blood into the 4 types
- Markéta Jánská (born 1981), Czech model
- Karl Guthe Jansky (1905–1950), American physicist, radio engineer and discoverer of radio waves emanating from the Milky Way

== See also ==
- Jansky (disambiguation)
