= Tacchini (crater) =

Crater on the Moon

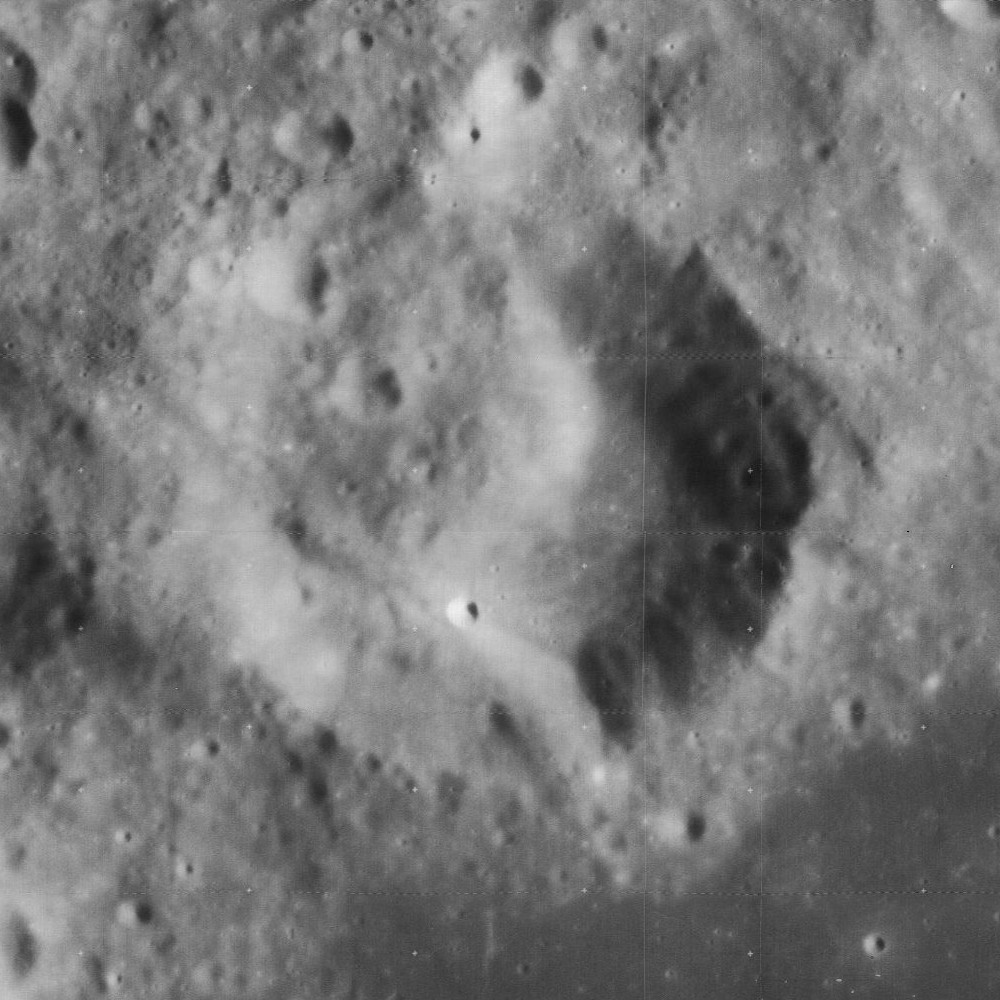
- Lunar Orbiter 4 image
- Coordinates: 4.9°N 85.8°E
- Diameter: 40 km
- Colongitude: 275° at sunrise
- Eponym: Pietro Tacchini

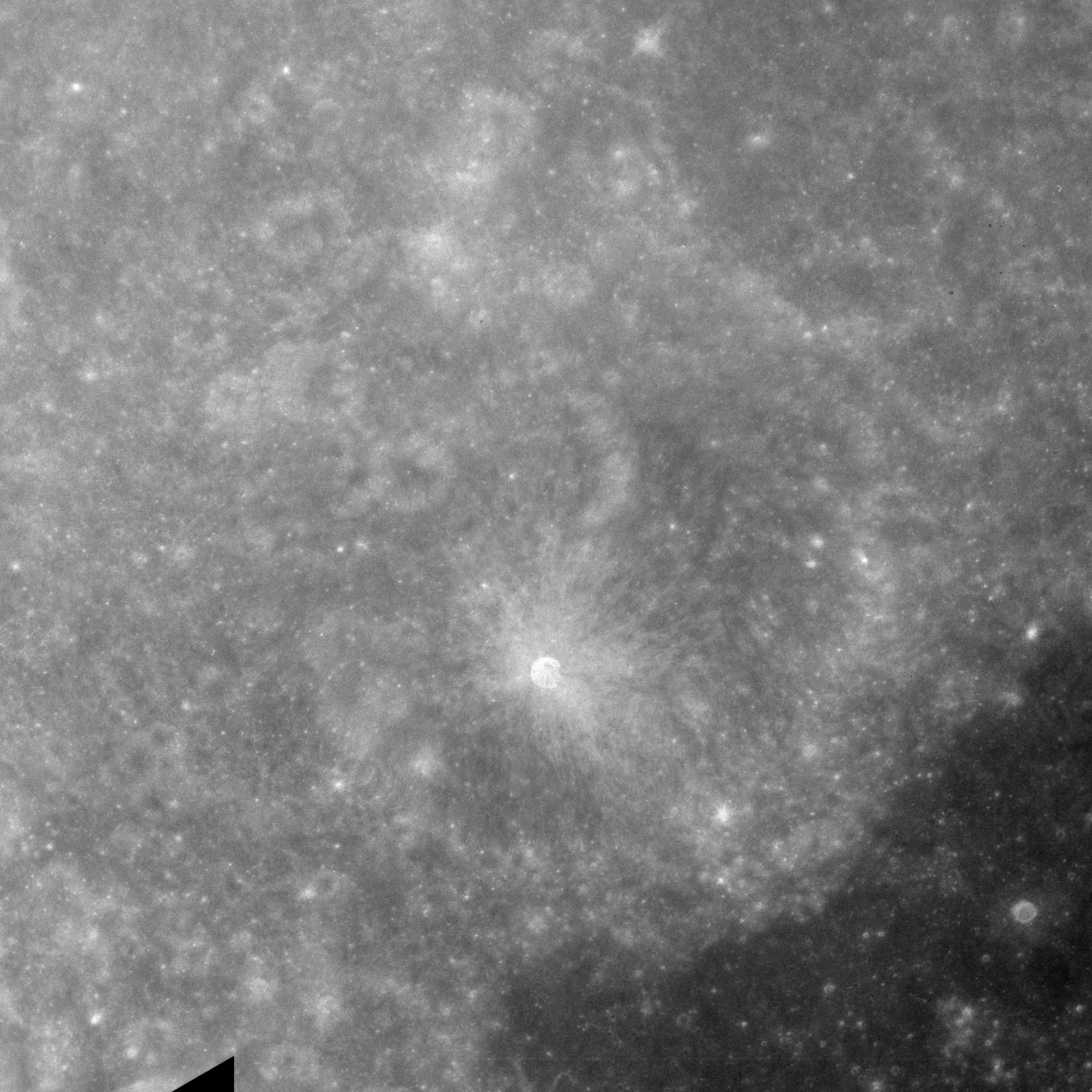
Apollo 17 image. The eroded rim is barely apparent in this high sun angle view (showing albedo due to lack of shadows).

Tacchini is a lunar impact crater on the northwestern edge of the Mare Smythii, near the eastern limb of the Moon. It was named after Italian astronomer Pietro Tacchini. It lies just to the south of the prominent crater Neper, and was designated Neper K before being given its current name by the IAU. To the west-southwest of Tacchini is the crater pair of Schubert and Back.

This crater is roughly circular in form, with a rim that is better defined along the eastern side. The northwestern half of the floor is elevated, along the side where ejecta from the younger Neper intrudes into the interior. There is a pair of small craters along the northwestern inner wall.

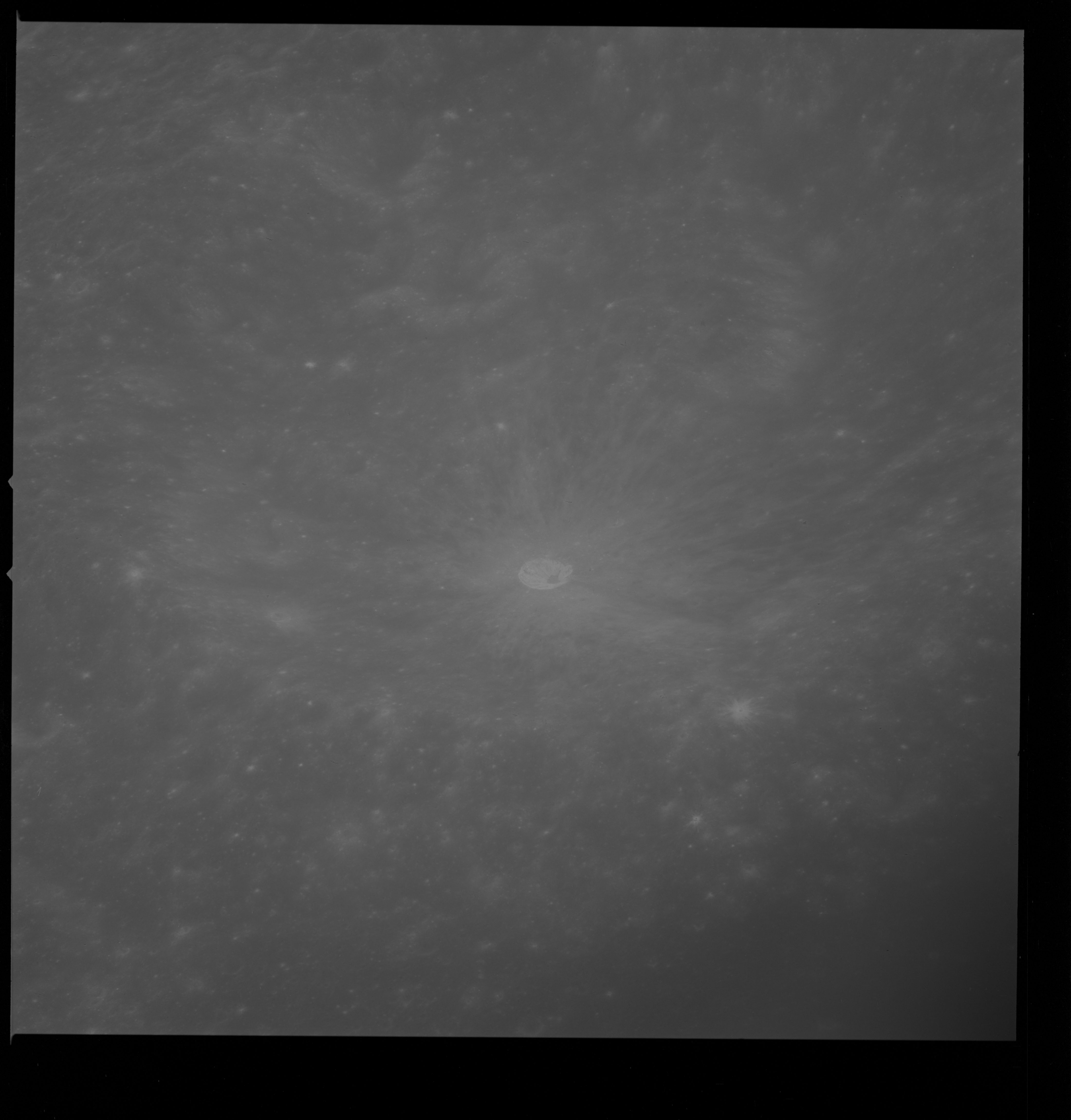
A 2-km diameter crater in southern Tacchini crater has a bright ray system in this Apollo 10 image
