= Mare Marginis =

Lunar mare

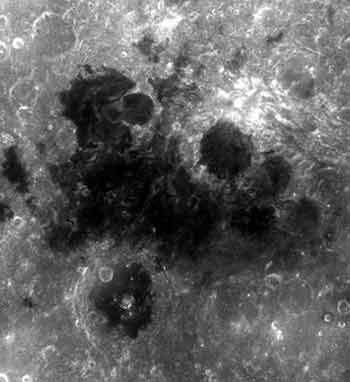
- Mare Marginis
- Coordinates: 13.3°N 86.1°E
- Diameter: 358 km
- Eponym: Sea of the Edge

Mare Marginis (Latin for 'Sea of the Edge'); /ˈmɑːrdʒɪnɪs/ MAR-jin-iss) is a lunar mare that lies on the very edge of the lunar nearside. The selenographic coordinates of this feature are 13.3° N, 86.1° E, and the diameter is 358 km.

This mare differs from most of the nearside maria; it has an irregular outline and appears fairly thin. It has small circular and elongated features in the mare plains that probably mark impact craters buried by less than 1000 to 1700 feet (300 to 500 m) of lava. Further, Mare Marginis is not centered on any clear, large impact basin. Thus, Mare Marginis marks a low-lying highlands region where mare lavas could reach the surface. Several large mare-floored craters also occur nearby. In these craters, the crater floors lie below the surrounding highland surface. Thus, they mark sites around Mare Marginis where lavas were close to the lunar surface. The major crater north of Marginis is Al-Biruni, with Ibn Yunus to the southeast and Goddard to the northwest.

The surface of this mare displays some lunar swirls; higher albedo deposits are similar to the Reiner Gamma feature on the Oceanus Procellarum. This feature is associated with a relatively strong magnetic field. It is also located at the antipode of the Mare Orientale impact basin, and may be associated with forming that feature. Other possible explanations for the formation include a cometary impact, venting of volcanic gases, or just normal surface markings shielded from space weathering due to the magnetic field. However, the exact cause of albedo features such as this is not completely understood.

== Extension of southwestern ejectaray from farside crater Giordano Bruno ==
North of Mare Marginis and east of Mare Crisium is the location of the extension of farside crater Giordano Bruno's southwestern ejectaray. This extension is observable during favourable libration of the moon's eastern rim, as seen from Earth. This extension is also noticeable on the photographic version of chart LAC 45 (page 90) in The Clementine Atlas of the Moon (Ben Bussey / Paul D. Spudis).

== Views ==
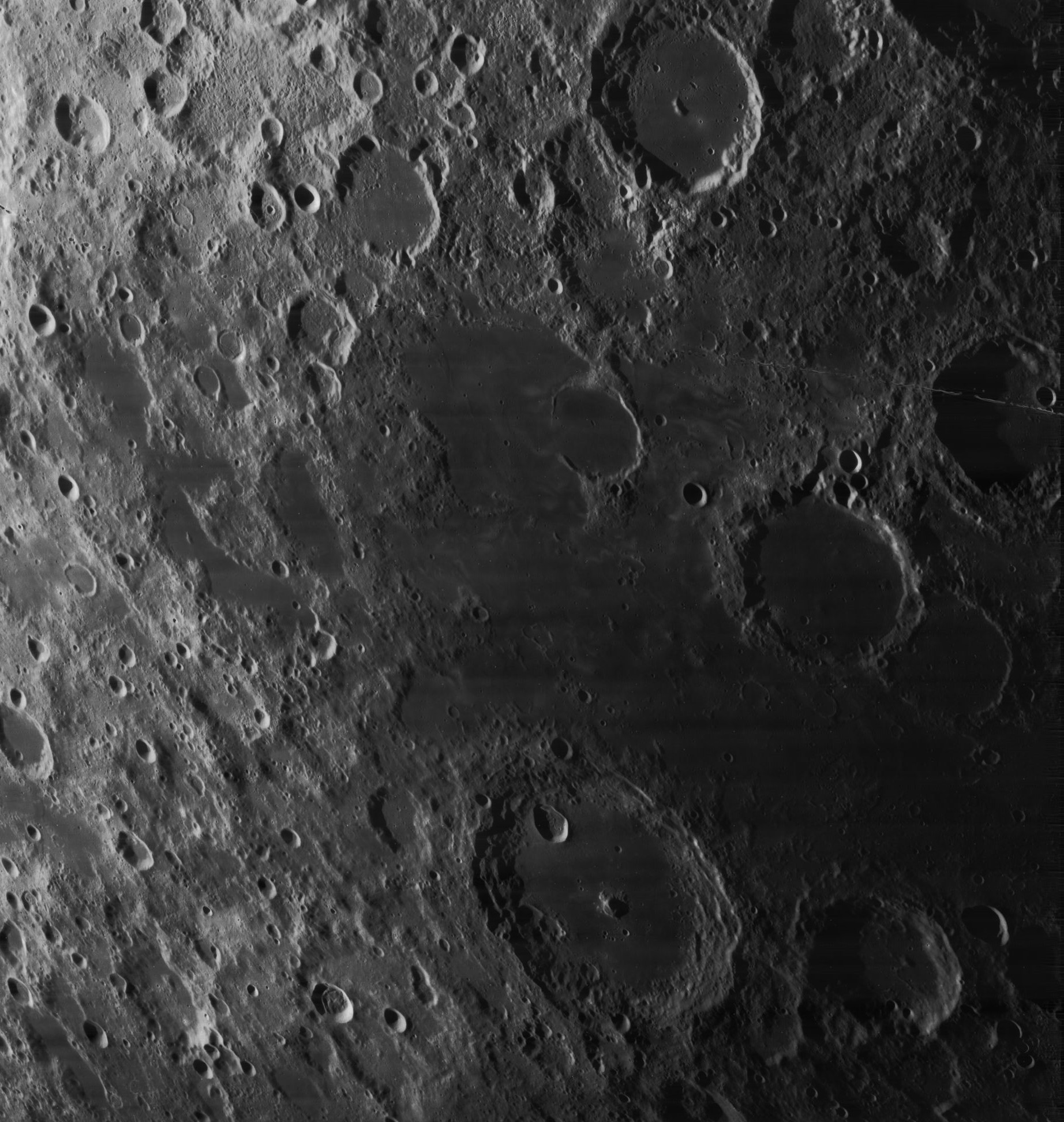
Oblique Lunar Orbiter 4 image of the western portion of Mare Marginis. The large crater to the south is Neper.

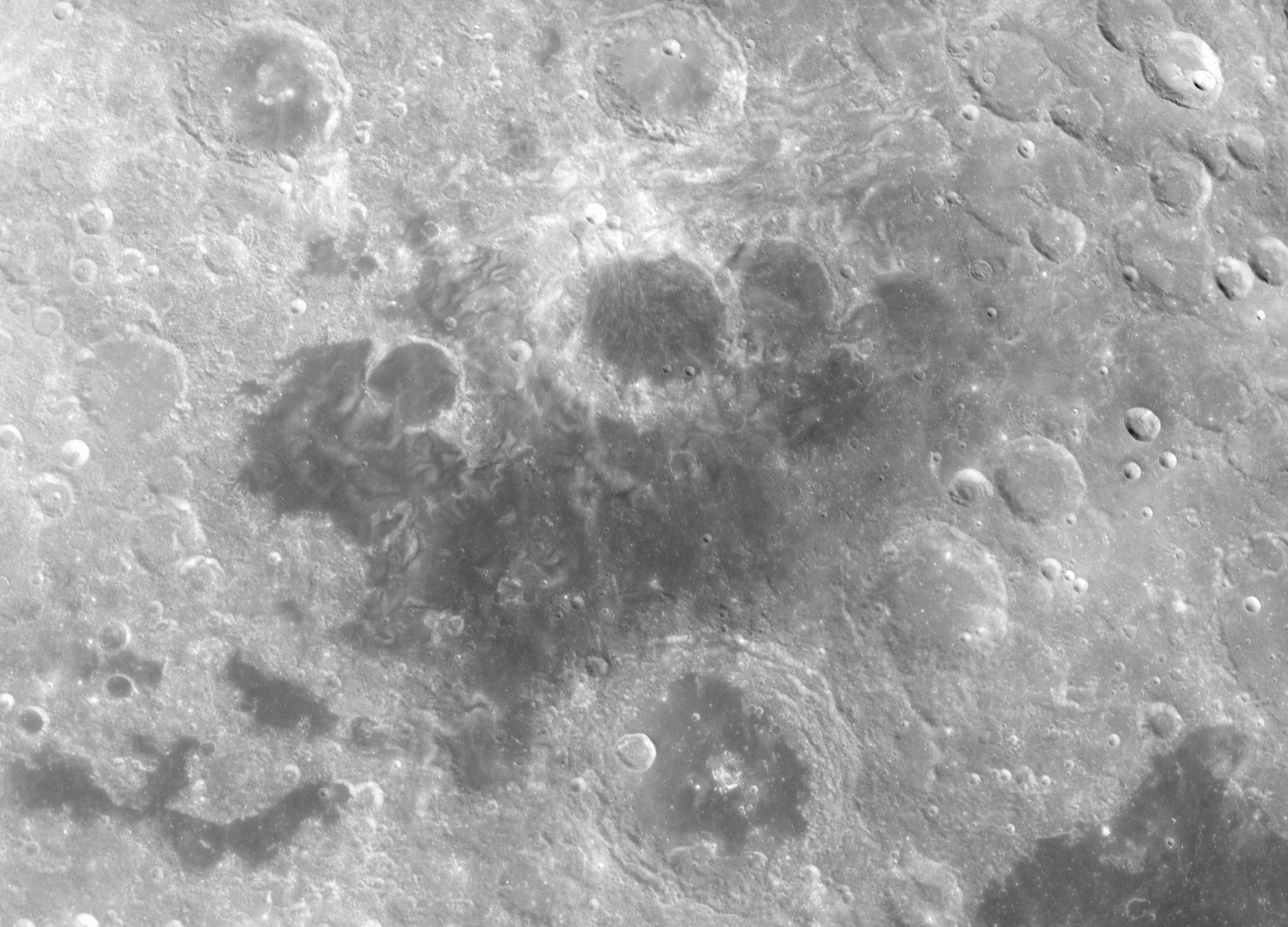
View from Apollo 16, with north in upper left.

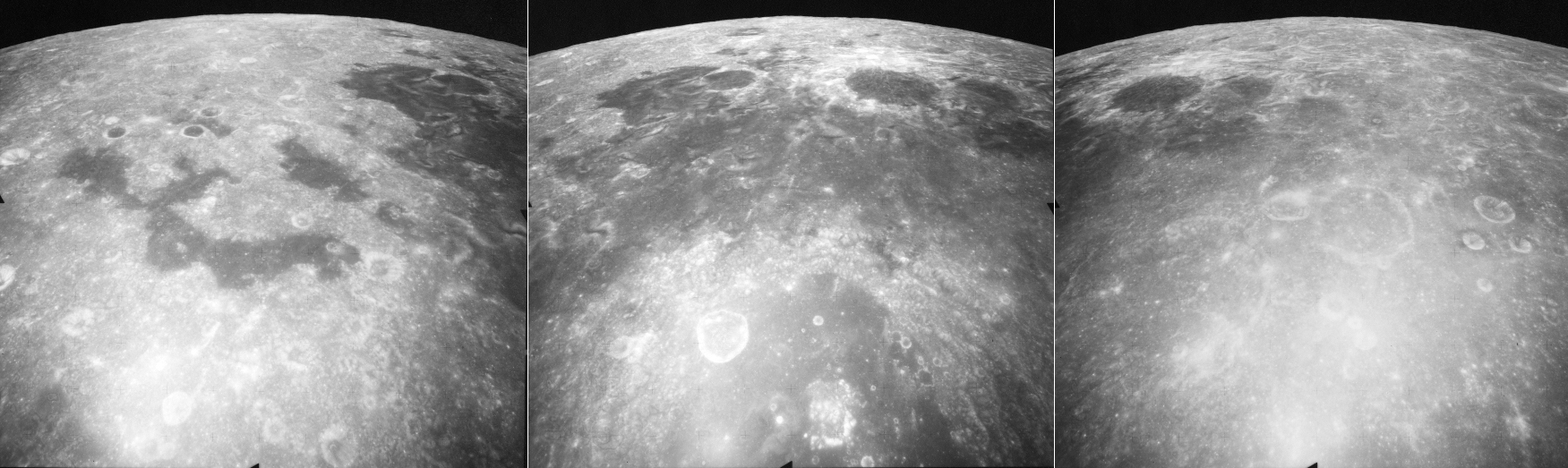
These are three views of Mare Marginis, taken by the mapping camera of the Apollo 17 mission in 1972, facing north-northeast from an average altitude of 124 km. At the right is the east side of Mare Marginis, with the craters Jansky, Jansky F, and the elongated Jansky D in the foreground, and the eastern mare is in the upper left. The center photo shows the central mare with the prominent crater Goddard surrounded by light materials, the crater Ibn Yunus immediately to its east, Goddard C to the west, half of the large crater Neper in the foreground, and the crater Hubble far to the north near the horizon. The swirls of light material in the mare, thought to be caused by magnetic fields, are visible in this photo. The left photo shows the western mare (more easily visible from Earth), with disconnected "lakes" of basalt, and the crater Cannon. These photos were taken within minutes of each other as the Command Module America orbited the Moon.

== See also ==
- Volcanism on the Moon
