= Pietro Tacchini =

Italian astronomer

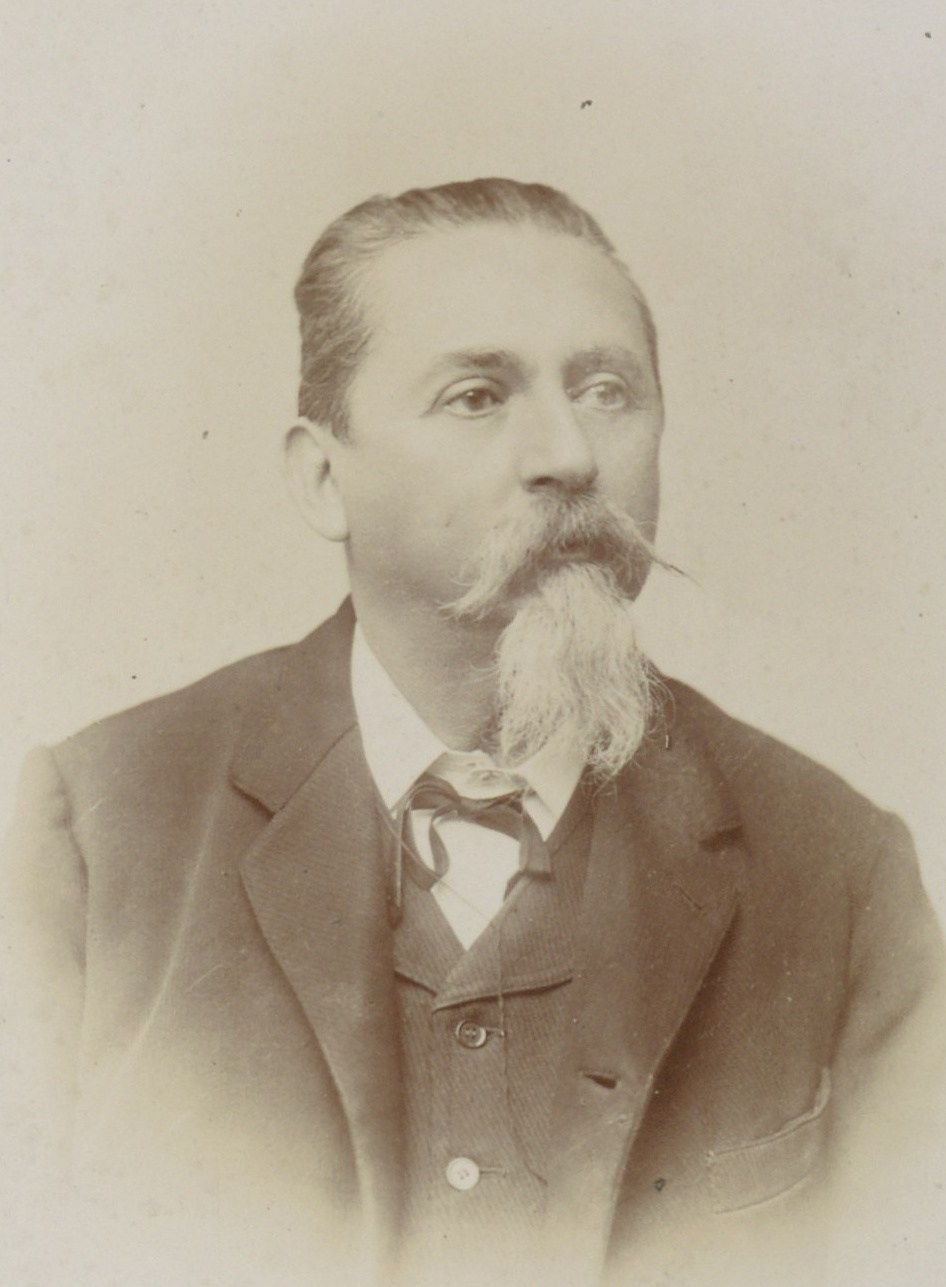
- Born: March 21, 1838; Modena, Duchy of Modena and Reggio
- Died: March 24, 1905 (aged 67); Modena, Italy
- Education: University of Padova
- Awards: Rumford Medal (1888); Janssen Medal (1892)
- Scientific career
- Workplaces: Observatory of the Collegio Romano; Central Office of Meteorology and Geodynamics

Pietro Tacchini (March 21, 1838 – March 24, 1905) was an Italian astronomer.

He was born and raised in Modena, Italy. He studied engineering at the University of Padova. At the age of 21, he was appointed the director of a small observatory in Modena. By 1863 he became the Primo Astronomo Aggiunto, or director of the observatory, at Palermo, Italy. He remained there until 1879, and focused most of his attention on observations of the Sun.

In 1865 he founded the specialist physical astronomy journal, Memorie della Società degli Spettroscopisti, and remained the editor until 1905. (This publication later became the Memorie della Società Astronomica Italiana in 1920.)

Tacchini established an observation network with other Italian astronomers to spectroscopically examine the sun at about the same time daily. He likewise organized an observatory in Calcutta to watch the sun when conditions were unfavorable in Italy. In 1874 he led an expedition to Muddapur, India to observe the transit of Venus across the sun.

In 1879 he was summoned to Rome where he succeeded Angelo Secchi at the Osservatorio del Collegio Romano. In 1881 he became head of the Ufficio Centrale di Meteorologia.

Due to his influence, the Bellini Observatory was completed on Mount Etna where Pietro believed that the high altitude would improve the spectroscopic observations of the sun, and potentially allow direct observations of the solar corona without an eclipse. He also recommended the construction of the Catania Observatory in 1885.

In 1888 he was awarded the Rumford Medal and in 1892 the Janssen Medal for his work on solar spectroscopy.

The crater Tacchini on the Moon is named for him, as well as the asteroid 8006 Tacchini.
