= Violeta G. Ivanova =

Bulgarian astronomer

Minor planets discovered: 14
3860 Plovdiv	8 August 1986	^{[1]}MPC
4102 Gergana	15 October 1988	MPC
4893 Seitter	9 August 1986	^{[1]}MPC
5950 Leukippos	9 August 1986	^{[1]}MPC
7079 Baghdad	5 September 1986	^{[1]}MPC
9732 Juchnovski	24 September 1984	^{[2]}MPC
9936 Al-Biruni	8 August 1986	^{[1]}MPC
11852 Shoumen	10 September 1988	^{[2]}MPC
11856 Nicolabonev	11 September 1988	^{[2]}MPC
12246 Pliska	11 September 1988	MPC
13930 Tashko	12 September 1988	MPC
13498 Al Chwarizmi	6 August 1986	^{[1]}MPC
14342 Iglika	23 September 1984	^{[1]}MPC
22283 Pytheas	6 August 1986	^{[1]}MPC
^{1} with E. W. Elst; ^{2} with V. Shkodrov

Violeta Ivanova (Bulgarian: Виолета Иванова) is a Bulgarian astronomer.

She is credited by the Minor Planet Center with the discovery of 14 asteroids between 1984 and 1988. She works at the Institute of Astronomy, Bulgarian Academy of Sciences and has made her discoveries at the Smolyan Observatory, which became the Rozhen National Observatory (at the Mount of Rozhen in the Rhodopes) some time after 2002. The Koronian asteroid 4365 Ivanova was named after her on 25 August 1991 (M.P.C. 18645).

She sometimes signs Violeta G. Ivanova. She should not be confused with V. V. Ivanova (who also signs V. F. Ivanova), now of the Institute of Physics, University of St. Petersburg, St. Petergof, Russia, previously with the Institut Geokhimii i Analiticheskoi Khimii (Vernadskii Institute of Geochemistry and Analytical Chemistry), Moscow.
