= Goddard (crater) =

Crater on the Moon

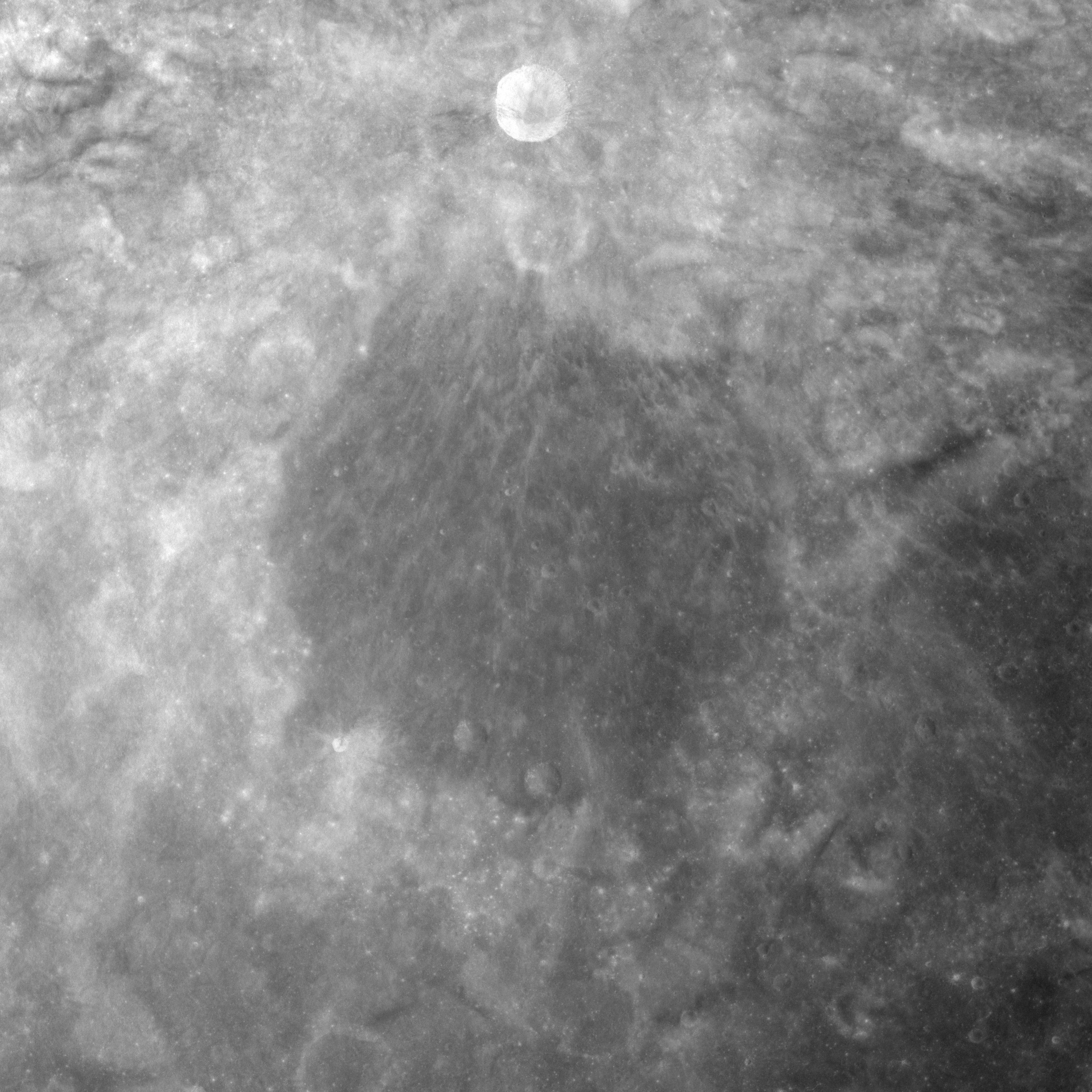
- Apollo 17 mapping camera image, with the small, bright Goddard A at top
- Coordinates: 14.8°N 89.0°E
- Diameter: 58 miles
- Depth: Unknown
- Colongitude: 272° at sunrise
- Eponym: Robert H. Goddard

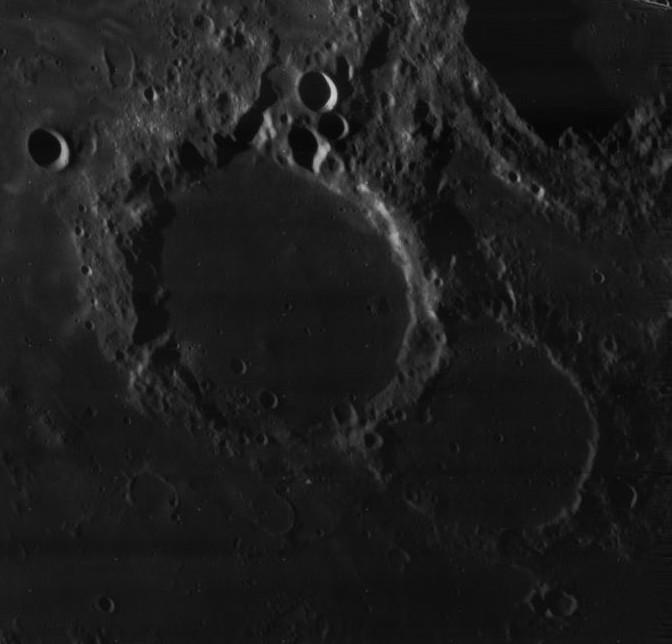
Oblique Lunar Orbiter 4 image of Goddard (large crater at left) and Ibn Yunus (right)

Goddard is a lunar impact crater that is located along the eastern limb of the Moon, and so is visible from the edge from Earth. It is best viewed during favorable librations when the orientation of the Moon brings it further into sight. The crater is located in the Mare Marginis, to the northeast of the prominent crater Neper. Ibn Yunus, a crater remnant, is attached to the southeastern rim and is partly overlaid by Goddard. To the northeast is Al-Biruni.

The rim of Goddard has nearly been destroyed along the southern edge, and the interior floor is connected to the surrounding mare through gaps in this section of the wall. The remainder of the rim is significantly eroded and worn, leaving only a ring of rugged ground surrounding the inner floor.

The floor of the crater has been resurfaced in the past by lava floods, leaving the interior nearly flat and featureless. There is no central peak, and only a few tiny craterlets mark the surface. The most prominent of these is a matched pair of small craterlets in the south-southwest part of the floor.

This feature is named after the pioneering American rocket scientist Robert H. Goddard (1882–1945).

== Satellite craters ==
By convention these features are identified on lunar maps by placing the letter on the side of the crater midpoint that is closest to Goddard.

Goddard	Latitude	Longitude	Diameter
A	17.0° N	89.6° E	12 km
B	16.0° N	86.8° E	12 km
C	16.5° N	85.1° E	49 km

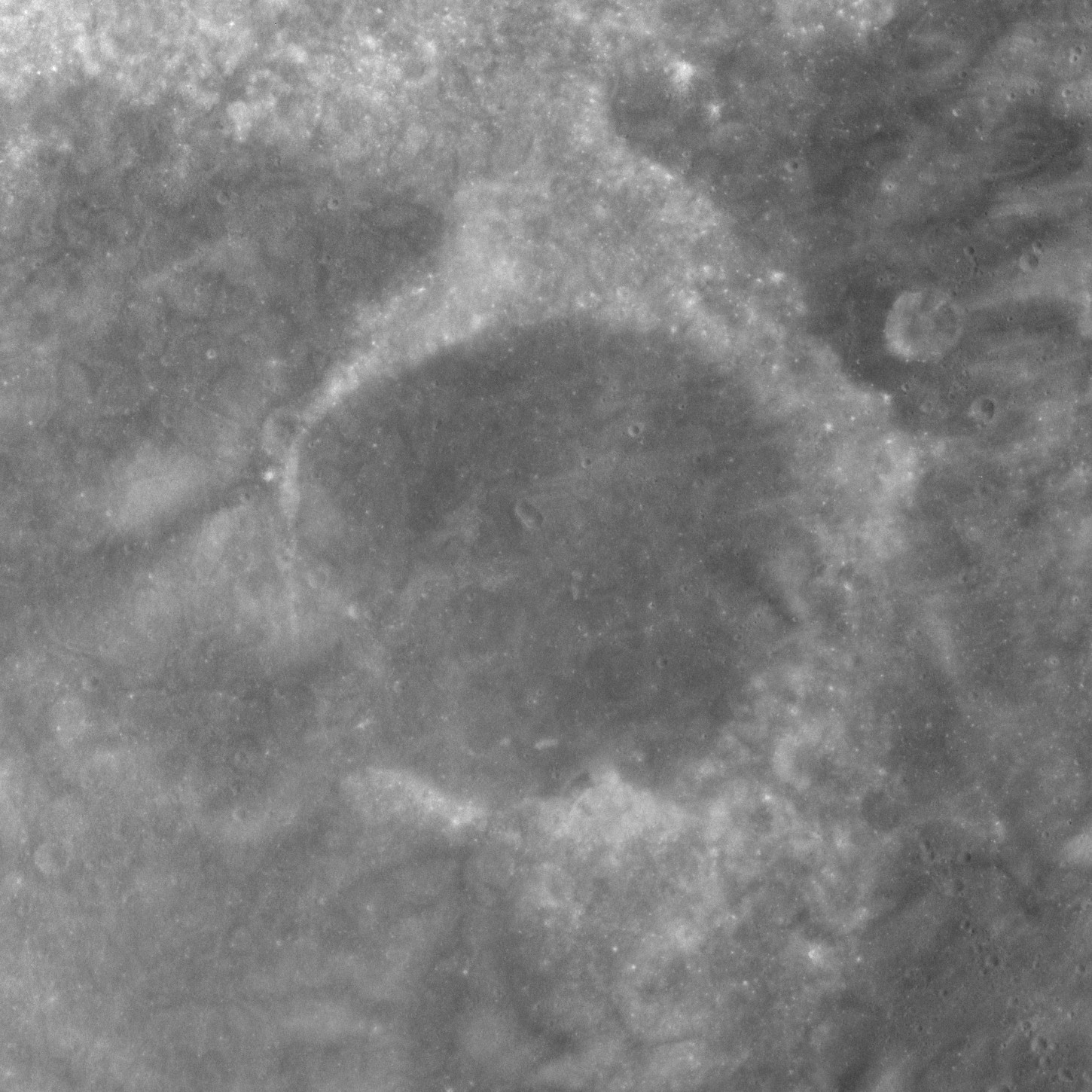
Goddard C crater
