= Neper (crater) =

Lunar impact crater

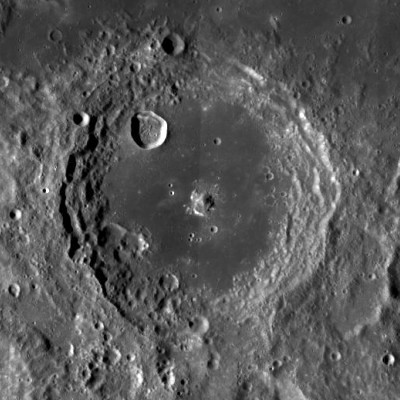
- LRO image
- Coordinates: 8.8°N 84.5°E
- Diameter: 137 km (85 miles)
- Depth: 4.45 km
- Colongitude: 343° at sunrise
- Formation: Nectarian
- Eponym: John Napier

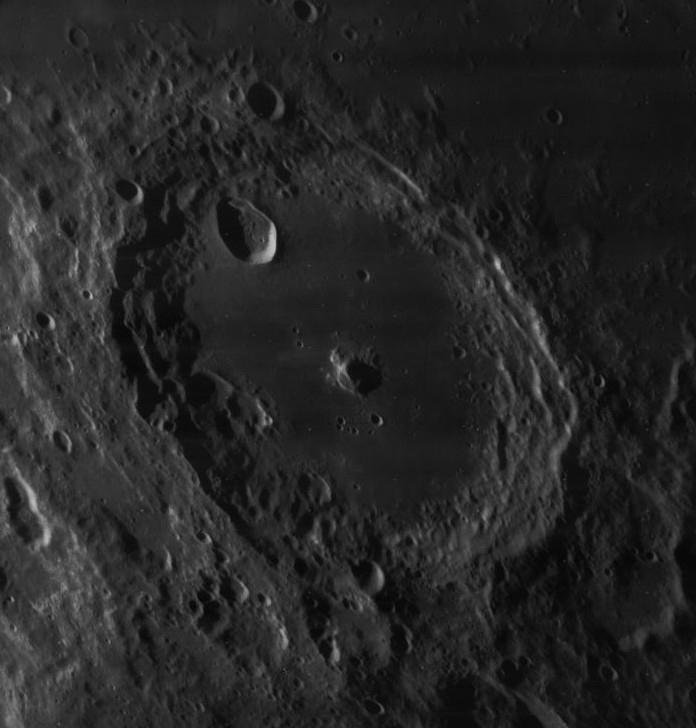
Oblique Lunar Orbiter 4 image

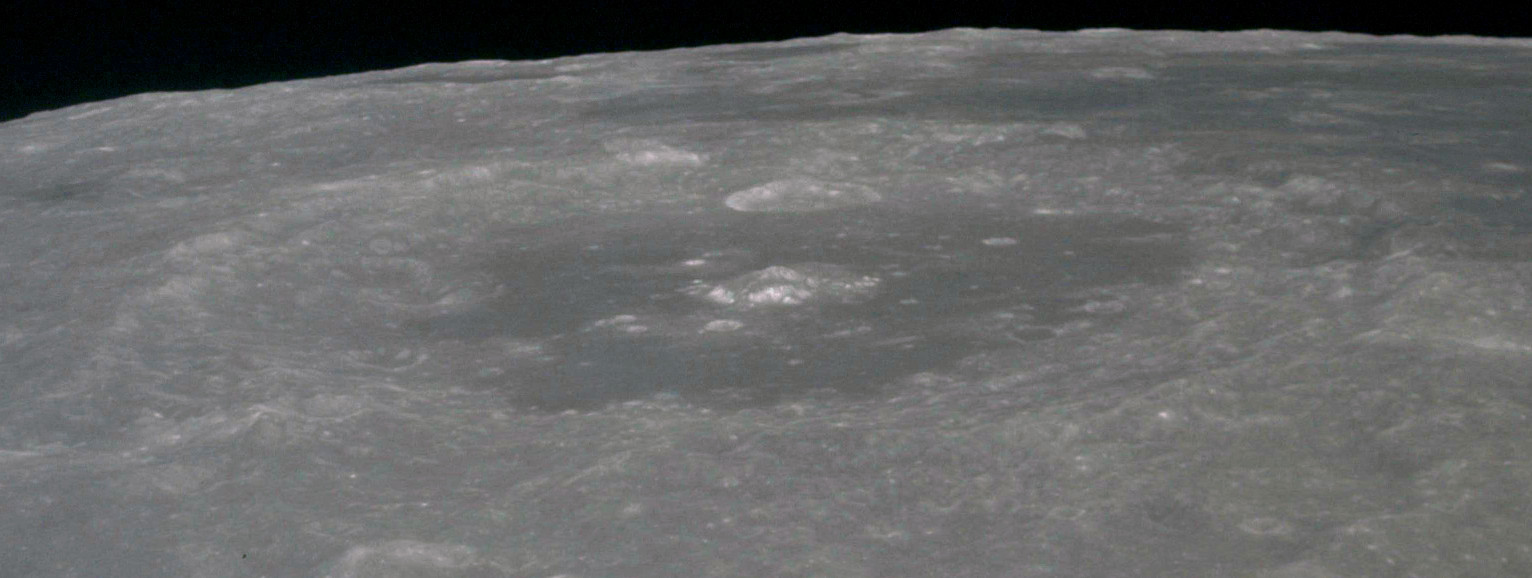
Oblique view from Apollo 10, facing northwest

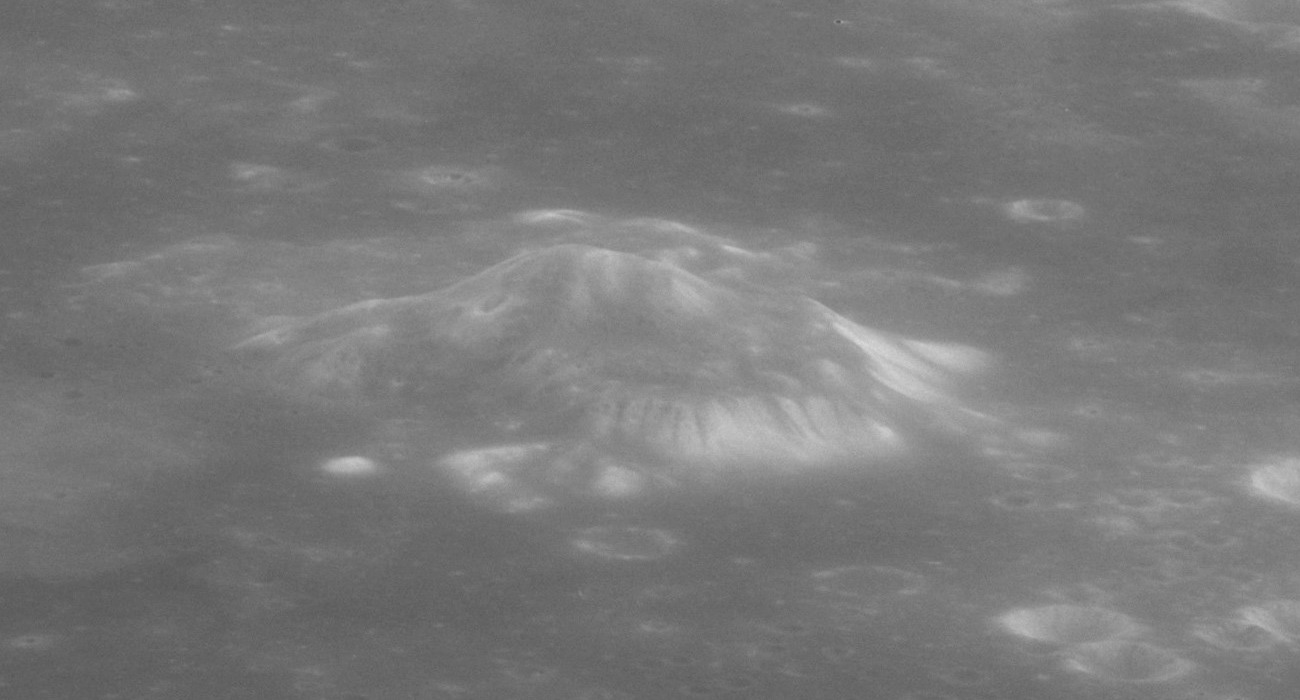
Oblique view of the central peak from Apollo 11, facing northeast

Neper is an old lunar impact crater located near the eastern limb of the Moon. Due to its location the crater must be viewed during a suitable libration, and is very foreshortened. The crater lies on the south edge of Mare Marginis, to the east of the crater Jansky. To the northwest across the Mare Marginis is the crater Goddard.

On the lunar geologic timescale, Neper is one of the largest craters of Nectarian age. The crater inner walls have worn terraces, with low rim edges at the northern and southern extremes. The crater floor is dark and flat, with a central peak and several crater impacts near the west rim. The most notable of these is a small crater near the north-northwestern edge. The infrared spectrum of pure crystalline plagioclase has been identified on the central peak.

This crater is named after the Scottish mathematician, physicist, astronomer and astrologer John Napier.

== Satellite craters ==
By convention these features are identified on lunar maps by placing the letter on the side of the crater midpoint that is closest to Neper.

Neper	Latitude	Longitude	Diameter
D	9.2° N	80.8° E	40 km
H	10.4° N	78.2° E	9 km
Q	8.0° N	83.1° E	12 km

The following craters have been renamed by the IAU.

- Neper G - See Virchow (crater).
- Neper K - See Tacchini (crater).
