= Ibn Yunus (crater) =

Crater on the Moon

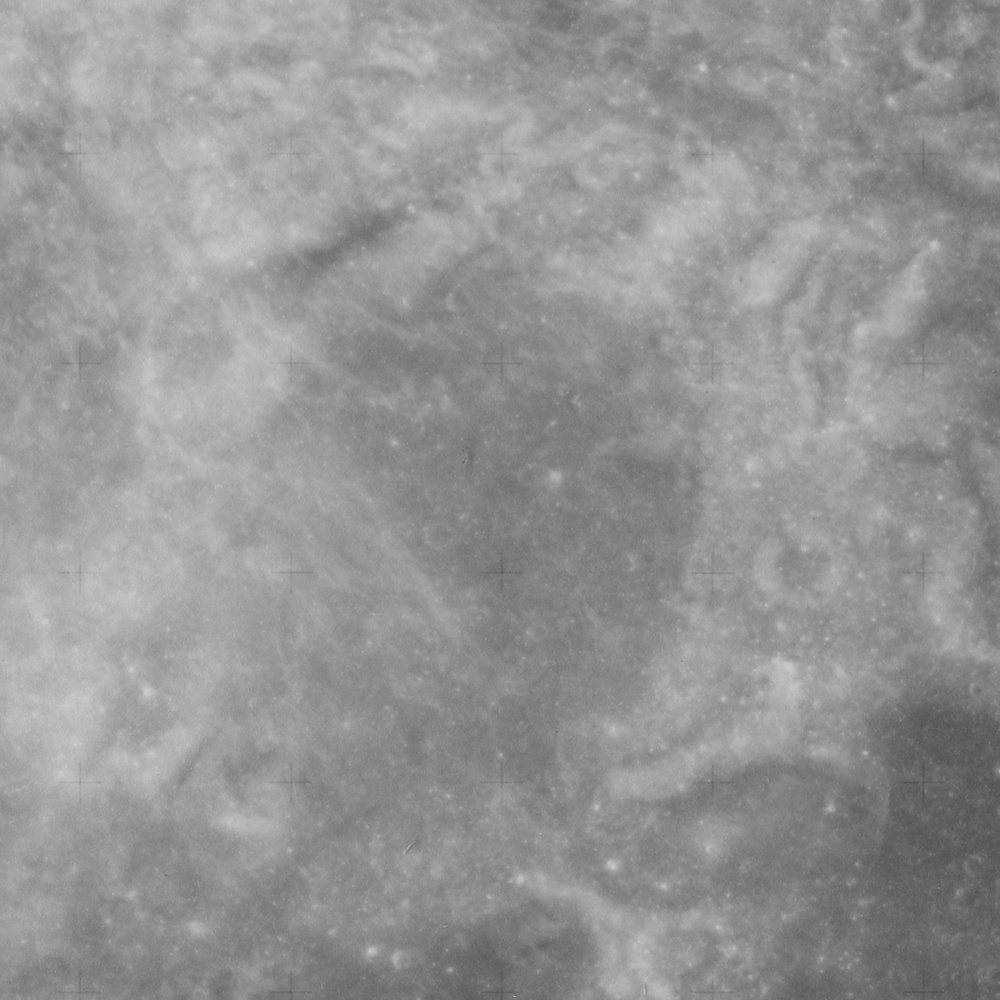
- Apollo 17 mapping camera image
- Coordinates: 14.1°N 91.1°E
- Diameter: 58 km
- Depth: Unknown
- Colongitude: 270° at sunrise
- Eponym: Ibn Yunus

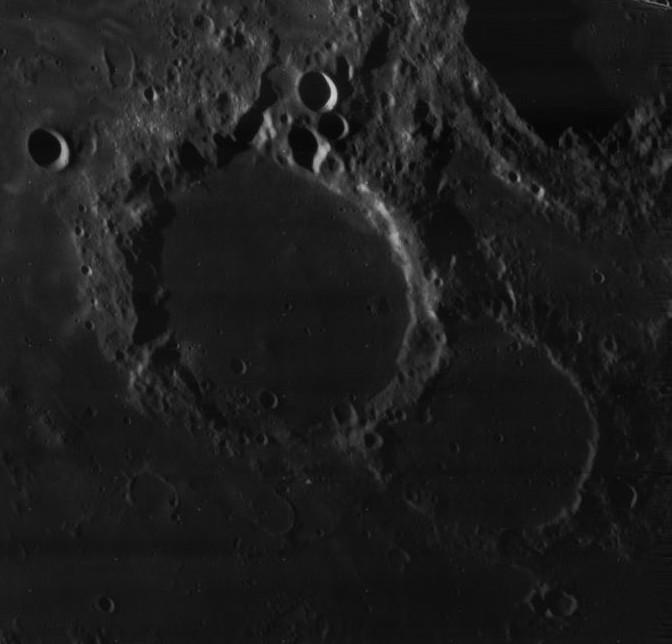
Oblique Lunar Orbiter 4 image of Goddard (large crater at left) and Ibn Yunus (right)

Ibn Yunus is the remains of a flooded lunar impact crater. It lies on the far side of the Moon, just past the eastern limb. It can only be viewed from Earth under conditions of favorable libration and lighting, and even then it is seen from the edge. This feature is attached to the east-southeastern outer rim of the flooded crater Goddard. It lies within the Mare Marginis, a lunar mare along the eastern limb.

What survives of this crater is a low, roughly circular ridge projecting up through the mare. This ring is broken along the western and southern edges, and the interior floor is covered by a nearly level surface with a relatively low albedo.
