= 9936 Al-Biruni =

Asteroid

- Orbit of Al-Biruni (blue) compared to the inner planets and Jupiter (outermost)

Discovery
- Discovered by: E. W. Elst; V. Ivanova
- Discovery site: Rozhen Obs.
- Discovery date: 8 August 1986

Designations
- Pronunciation: /ælbɪˈruːni/
- Named after: البيروني al-Bīrūnī (Persian astronomer)
- Alternative designations: 1986 PN_{4} · 1981 UV_{12}
- Minor planet category: main-belt · (outer)

Orbital characteristics
- Epoch 4 September 2017 (JD 2458000.5)
- Uncertainty parameter 0
- Observation arc: 35.62 yr (13,009 days)
- Aphelion: 3.6534 AU
- Perihelion: 2.5107 AU
- Semi-major axis: 3.0820 AU
- Eccentricity: 0.1854
- Orbital period (sidereal): 5.41 yr (1,976 days)
- Mean anomaly: 279.59°
- Mean motion: 0° 10^{m} 55.92^{s} / day
- Inclination: 15.404°
- Longitude of ascending node: 310.41°
- Argument of perihelion: 13.774°

Physical characteristics
- Dimensions: 22.16 km (calculated); 23.890±0.170; 24.187±0.314 km 27.81±1.61 km
- Synodic rotation period: 10.704±0.010 h
- Geometric albedo: 0.048±0.006; 0.057 (assumed); 0.0632±0.0151; 0.065±0.012
- Spectral type: C
- Absolute magnitude (H): 12.1 · 11.7 · 12.0

9936 Al-Biruni, provisional designation 1986 PN_{4}, is a carbonaceous asteroid from the outer region of the asteroid belt, approximately 24 kilometers in diameter. It was discovered on 8 August 1986, by Belgian and Bulgarian astronomers Eric Elst and Violeta Ivanova at the Rozhen Observatory, located in Bulgaria's Smolyan province near the border to Greece. It was named for Persian medieval scholar Al-Biruni.

== Orbit and classification ==
Al-Biruni orbits the Sun in the outer main-belt at a distance of 2.5–3.7 AU once every 5 years and 5 months (1,976 days). Its orbit has an eccentricity of 0.19 and an inclination of 15° with respect to the ecliptic. It was first identified as 1981 UV_{12} at Crimea-Nauchnij in 1981, extending the body's observation arc by 5 years prior to its official discovery at Rozhen.

== Lightcurve ==
A rotational lightcurve of Al-Biruni was obtained from photometric observations made at the U.S. Goodsell Observatory (741), Minnesota, in August 2002. The lightcurve gave a rotation period of 10.704±0.010 hours with a brightness amplitude of 0.14 in magnitude (U=2)

== Diameter and albedo ==
According to the space-based surveys carried out by the Japanese Akari satellite and the NEOWISE mission of NASA's Wide-field Infrared Survey Explorer, Al-Biruni measures between 23.9 and 27.8 kilometers in diameter, and its surface has a corresponding albedo of 0.048 to 0.065. The Collaborative Asteroid Lightcurve Link assumes a standard albedo for carbonaceous asteroids of 0.057 and calculates a diameter of 22.2 kilometers with an absolute magnitude of 12.0.

== Naming ==
The minor planet was named after the Persian scholar and polymath Al-Biruni (973–1048). Regarded as the founder of Indology and the father of geodesy, he made important contributions to anthropology, mathematics and astronomy. In particular, he is known for developing a method for the summation of series, for solving algebraic equations, and for the triangulation of distances on Earth's surface. The official naming citation was published by the Minor Planet Center on 26 September 2007 (M.P.C. 60728). The lunar crater Al-Biruni is also named in his honour.
