= Jansky (crater) =

Crater on the Moon

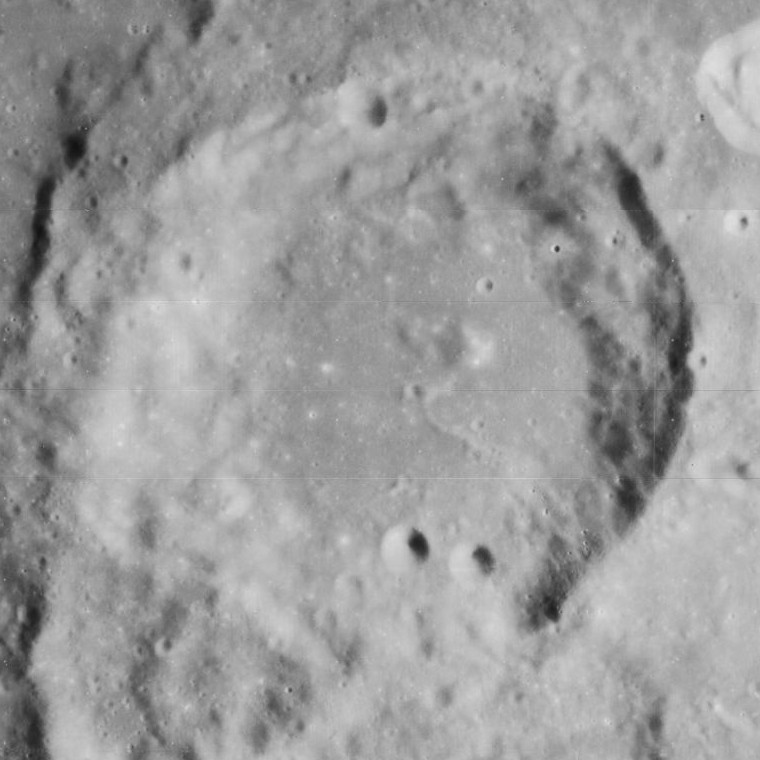
- Lunar Orbiter 4 image
- Coordinates: 8.63°N 89.5°E
- Diameter: 73.77 km
- Colongitude: 272° at sunrise
- Eponym: Karl Guthe Jansky

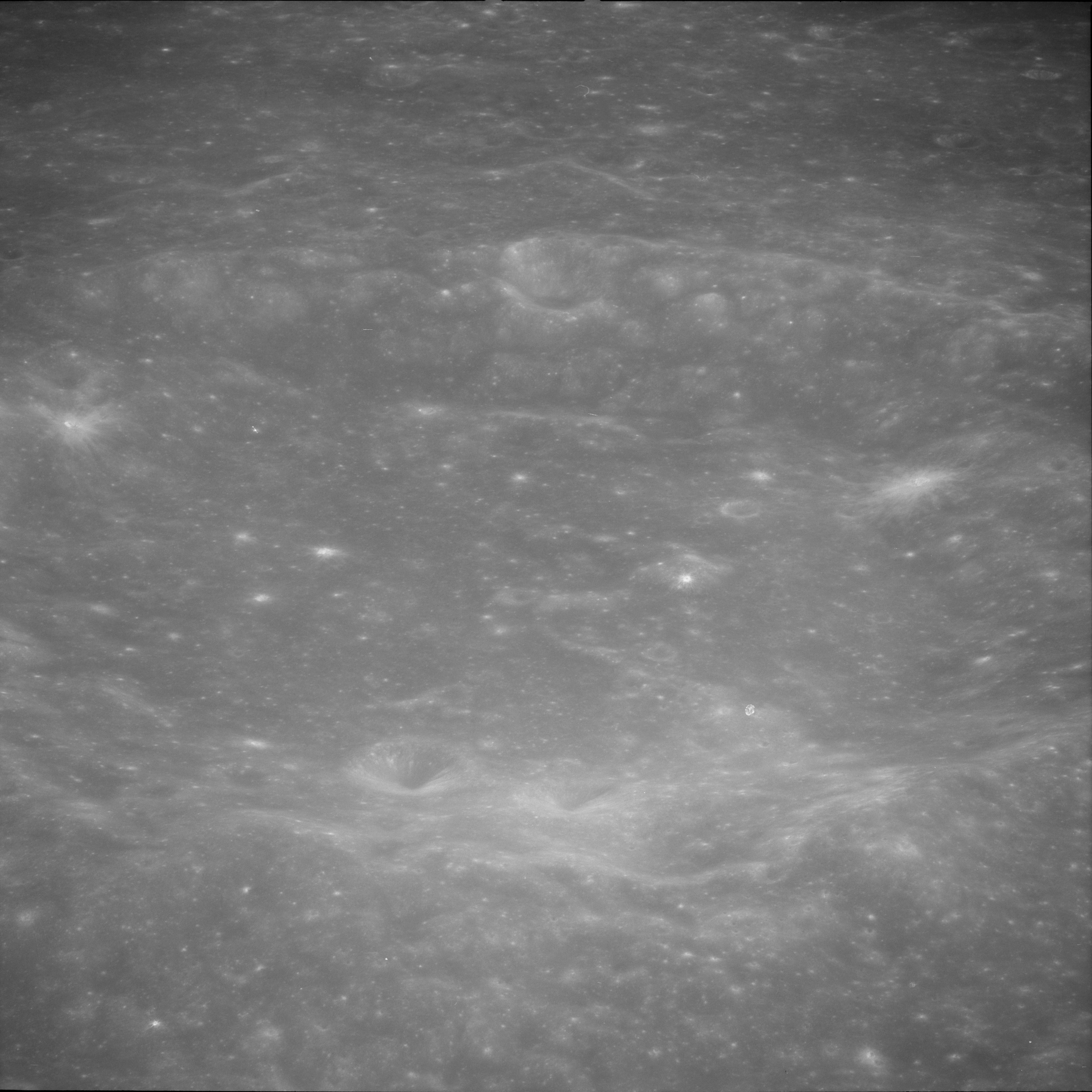
Oblique view from Apollo 11

Jansky is a lunar impact crater that lies along the eastern limb of the Moon. It lies due east of a larger walled plain named Neper, along the southern edge of the Mare Marginis. Due to its location, this crater is viewed from the side from Earth, limiting the amount of detail that can be observed. The visibility is also affected by libration, which can completely conceal this formation from view.

This is a worn crater with an eroded rim. The southern part of the rim in particular is disrupted and irregular in form, with a pair of small craters along the inner wall. The remainder of the rim is roughly circular. The interior floor is relatively featureless, except for a few small craters.

This crater is named after American radio engineer Karl Jansky (1095–1950), one of the founders of radio astronomy.

== Satellite craters ==
By convention these features are identified on lunar maps by placing the letter on the side of the crater midpoint that is closest to Jansky.

Jansky	Latitude	Longitude	Diameter
D	9.5° N	91.2° E	20 km
F	8.8° N	92.2° E	50 km
H	7.8° N	91.3° E	11 km
