= Al-Biruni =

Khwarazmian polymath (973–1048)

Abu Reyhan Biruni
- ابوریحان بیرونی
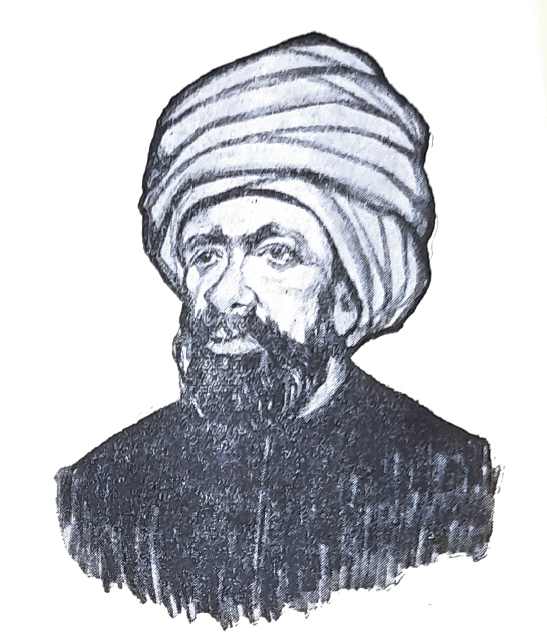
- A sketch representing Al-Biruni from a book entitled Sayr mulhimah: min al-Sharq wa-al-Gharb by unknown author, 1961
- Born: 4 September 973; Kath, Khwarazm (modern-day Uzbekistan)
- Died: 9 December 1048; Ghazni, Ghaznavid Empire (modern-day Afghanistan)
- Era: Islamic Golden Age
- Known for: The Remaining Signs of Past Centuries, Tārīkh al-Hind, Canon Mas'udicus, Kitab al-Jamahir, Kitab al-Tafhim, Kitāb al-Ṣaydana
- Scientific career
- Fields: Astronomy, mathematics, geodesy, pharmacology, mineralogy, history, geography, comparative religion, Indology
- Academic advisors: Abu Nasr Mansur

Abu Reyhan Muhammad ibn Ahmad al-Biruni (Note: /ælbɪˈruːni/) (Persian: ابوریحان محمد بن احمد بیرونی, romanized: Abū-Reyhān Bīrūnī; Arabic: أبو الريحان محمد بن أحمد البيروني; c. 973 – c. 1050), known as Biruni (بیرونی), was an Iranian Khwarazmian polymath of the Islamic Golden Age. Well versed in physics, mathematics, astronomy and the natural sciences, he also distinguished himself as a historian, chronologist and linguist, and has been described as the first anthropologist and a founding figure in comparative religion, geodesy and Indology.

Born in Kath in Khwarazm, al-Biruni spent the first twenty-five years of his life there before moving, after the fall of the Afrighids in 995, between the courts of Bukhara, Tabaristan and Gurganj. Around 1000 he completed his first major work, al-Āthār al-bāqiya ʿan al-qurūn al-khāliya, on historical and scientific chronology. From 1017 he lived at Ghazni under Mahmud of Ghazni, serving as court astrologer and accompanying Mahmud's campaigns in the Indian subcontinent; the resulting Tārīkh al-Hind, finished around 1030, is the work on which his reputation as an Indologist chiefly rests. He died at Ghazni around 1050.

He studied almost all the sciences of his day and was rewarded abundantly for his research in many fields of knowledge. Royalty and other powerful elements in society funded al-Biruni's research and sought him out with specific projects in mind. Influential in his own right, he was himself influenced by the scholars of other nations, such as the Greeks, from whom he took inspiration when he turned to the study of philosophy. A gifted linguist, in addition to his native Khwarezmian he was conversant in Persian, Arabic and Sanskrit, and also knew Greek, Hebrew and Syriac. He was, for his time, an admirably impartial writer on the customs and creeds of various nations, his scholarly objectivity earning him the title al-Ustadh ("The Master") in recognition of his remarkable description of early 11th-century India.

== Name ==
Biruni or Al-Biruni's name is derived from the Persian word bērūn or bīrūn ("outskirts"), as he was born in an outlying district of Kath, the capital of the Afrighid kingdom of Khwarazm. The city, now called Beruniy, is part of the autonomous republic of Karakalpakstan in northwest Uzbekistan.

His name was most commonly latinized as Alberonius.

== Life ==
=== Early years in Khwarazm ===
Al-Biruni spent the first twenty-five years of his life in Khwarazm, where he studied Islamic jurisprudence, theology, grammar, mathematics, astronomy, medicine and philosophy, and dabbled not only in the field of physics but in most of the other sciences of his day. His mother tongue was Khwarezmian, an Eastern Iranian language that survived in the region for several centuries after the coming of Islam, until its Turkification; at least some of the culture of ancient Khwarezm endured with it, for it is hard to imagine that a commanding figure such as Biruni, a repository of so much knowledge, should have appeared in a cultural vacuum.

He was sympathetic to the Afrighids, who were overthrown by the rival dynasty of the Ma'munids in 995. He left his homeland for Bukhara, then under the Samanid ruler Mansur II, the son of Nuh II, and corresponded with Avicenna; their exchange of views is extant.

=== Tabaristan and Gurganj ===
In 998 he went to the court of the Ziyarid amir of Tabaristan, Qabus (r. 977–981, 997–1012). There he wrote his first major work, al-Āthār al-bāqiya ʿan al-qurūn al-khāliya ("The Remaining Signs of Past Centuries", also translated as "Chronology of Ancient Nations" or "Vestiges of the Past"), on historical and scientific chronology, probably around 1000, though he later revised it. He also visited the court of the Bavandid ruler Al-Marzuban. Accepting the definite demise of the Afrighids at the hands of the Ma'munids, he made peace with the latter, who then ruled Khwarazm. Their court at Gurganj was gaining a reputation as a gathering place for brilliant scientists, and there he collaborated again with his former teacher Abu Nasr Mansur.

=== Ghazni and India ===
In July 1017, following the murder of the Khwarazmshah Abu'l-Abbas Ma'mun, Mahmud of Ghazni invaded Khwarazm and took Kath; in the same year he also captured Rey. Al-Biruni, Abu Nasr Mansur and most other scholars left with the victorious Mahmud, possibly as prisoners, and were brought to Ghazni, the Ghaznavid capital in what is now central-eastern Afghanistan, where al-Biruni spent much of the rest of his life.

He was made court astrologer and, from 1017, accompanied Mahmud on his campaigns in the Indian subcontinent, living there for several years; he was 44 at the time of the first journey. He became acquainted with all things related to India, and from his exploration of the Hindu faith and of Indian culture came his treatise Tārīkh al-Hind ("The History of India"), which he completed around 1030. (Note: Al-Biruni's al-Hind (India) encompassed most of the Indian subcontinent. Though Biruni's treatise "suggests that, to some extent, he excluded al-Sind from al-Hind.") He also made sure to extend his study to the sciences while on the expeditions, seeking a method to measure the height of the Sun and devising a makeshift quadrant for that purpose, and was able to make much progress in his research over the frequent travels he undertook throughout the lands of India.

== Astronomy ==
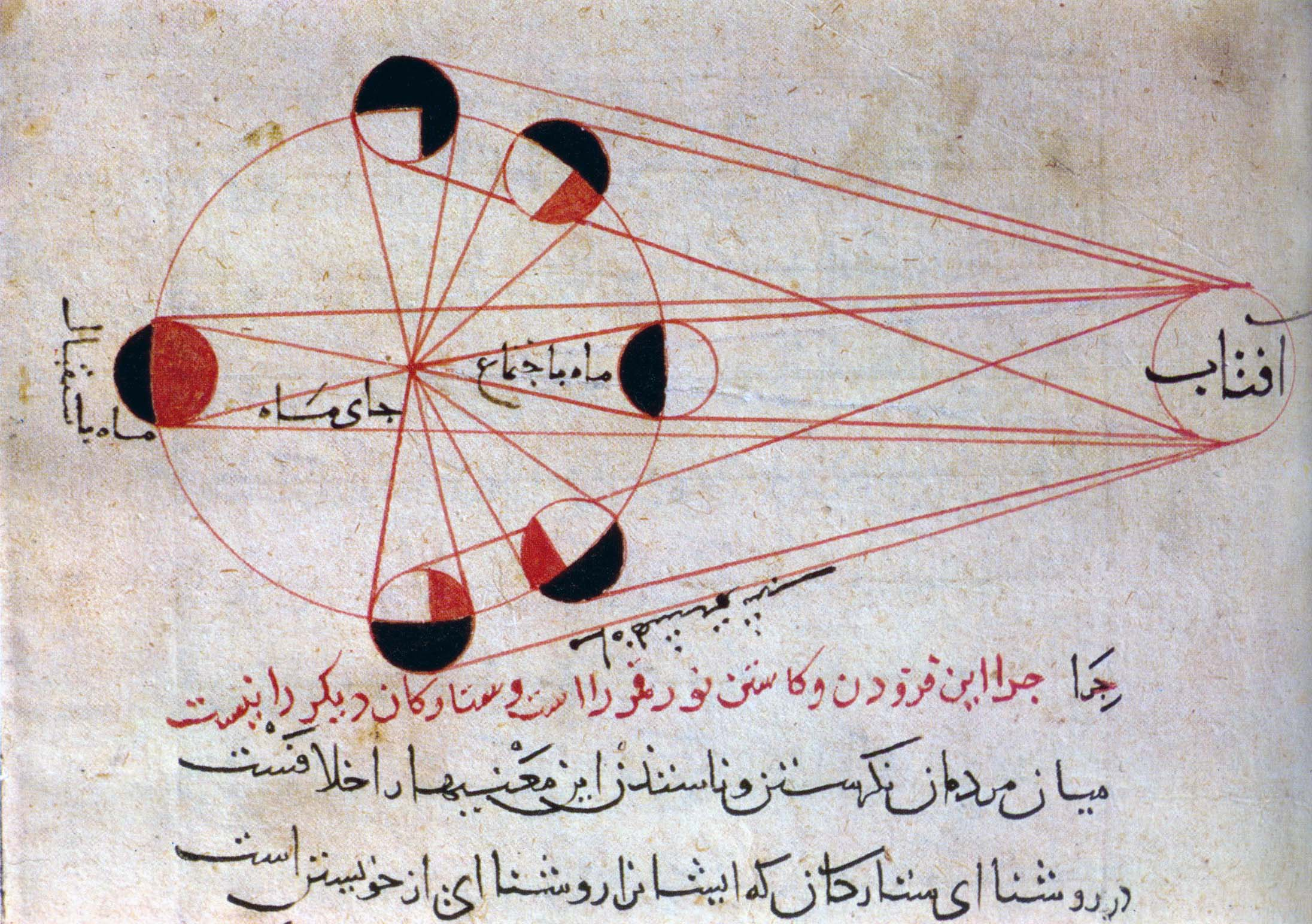
An illustration from al-Biruni's astronomical works in Persian, explains the different phases of the Moon, with respect to the position of the Sun

Of the 146 books written by al-Bīrūnī, 95 are devoted to astronomy, mathematics, and related subjects like mathematical geography. He lived during the Islamic Golden Age, when the Abbasid Caliphs promoted astronomical research, because such research possessed not only a scientific but also a religious dimension: in Islam, worship and prayer require a knowledge of the precise directions of sacred locations, which can be determined accurately only through the use of astronomical data. In carrying out his research, al-Biruni used a variety of different techniques dependent upon the particular field of study involved.

His major work on astrology is primarily an astronomical and mathematical text; he states: "I have begun with Geometry and proceeded to Arithmetic and the Science of Numbers, then to the structure of the Universe and finally to Judicial Astrology [sic], for no one who is worthy of the style and title of Astrologer [sic] who is not thoroughly conversant with these for sciences." In these earlier chapters he lays the foundations for the final chapter, on astrological prognostication, which he criticises. In a later work, he wrote a refutation of astrology, in contradistinction to the legitimate science of astronomy, for which he expresses wholehearted support. Some suggest that his reasons for refuting astrology relate to the methods used by astrologers being based upon pseudoscience rather than empiricism and also to a conflict between the views of the astrologers and those of the orthodox theologians of Sunni Islam.

He wrote an extensive commentary on Indian astronomy in the Taḥqīq mā li-l-Hind, mostly translation of Aryabhatta's work, in which he claims to have resolved the matter of Earth's rotation in a work on astronomy that is no longer extant, his Miftah-ilm-alhai'a ("Key to Astronomy"):

The rotation of the earth does in no way impair the value of astronomy, as all appearances of an astronomic character can quite as well be explained according to this theory as to the other. There are, however, other reasons which make it impossible. This question is most difficult to solve. The most prominent of both modern and ancient astronomers have deeply studied the question of the moving of the earth, and tried to refute it. We, too, have composed a book on the subject called Miftah-ilm-alhai'a (Key to Astronomy), in which we think we have surpassed our predecessors, if not in the words, at all events in the matter.

In his major astronomical work, the Mas'ud Canon, Biruni observed that, contrary to Ptolemy, the Sun's apogee (highest point in the heavens) was mobile, not fixed. He wrote a treatise on the astrolabe, describing how to use it to tell the time and as a quadrant for surveying. One particular diagram of an eight-geared device could be considered an ancestor of later Muslim astrolabes and clocks. More recently, Biruni's eclipse data was used by Dunthorne in 1749 to help determine the acceleration of the Moon, and his data on equinox times and eclipses was used as part of a study of Earth's past rotation.

== Refutation of Eternal Universe ==
Like later adherents of the Ash'ari school, such as al-Ghazali, al-Biruni is known for vehemently defending the majority Sunni position that the universe had a beginning, being a strong supporter of creatio ex nihilo, specifically refuting the philosopher Ibn Sina in a multiple letter correspondence. Al-Biruni stated:

"Other people, besides, hold this foolish persuasion, that time has no terminus quo at all."

He further stated that Aristotle, whose arguments Avicenna uses, contradicted himself when he stated that the universe and matter has a start whilst holding on to the idea that matter is pre-eternal. In his letters to Avicenna, he stated the argument of Aristotle, that there is a change in the creator. He further argued that stating there is a change in the creator would mean there is a change in the effect (meaning the universe has change) and that the universe coming into being after not being is such a change (and so arguing there is no change – no beginning – means Aristotle believes the creator is negated). Al-Biruni was proud of the fact that he followed the textual evidence of the religion without being influenced by Greek philosophers such as Aristotle.

== Physics ==
Al-Biruni contributed to the introduction of the scientific method to medieval mechanics. He developed experimental methods to determine density, using a particular type of hydrostatic balance. His method was precise, and he was able to measure the density of many different substances, including precious metals, gems, and even air; he also wrote extensively on the subject of density, including the different types of densities and how they are measured, work that proved very influential. He likewise applied an experimental method to determine the radius of the Earth, by measuring the angle of elevation of the horizon from the top of a mountain and comparing it to that from a nearby plain, as described in the following section.

== Geography and geodesy ==
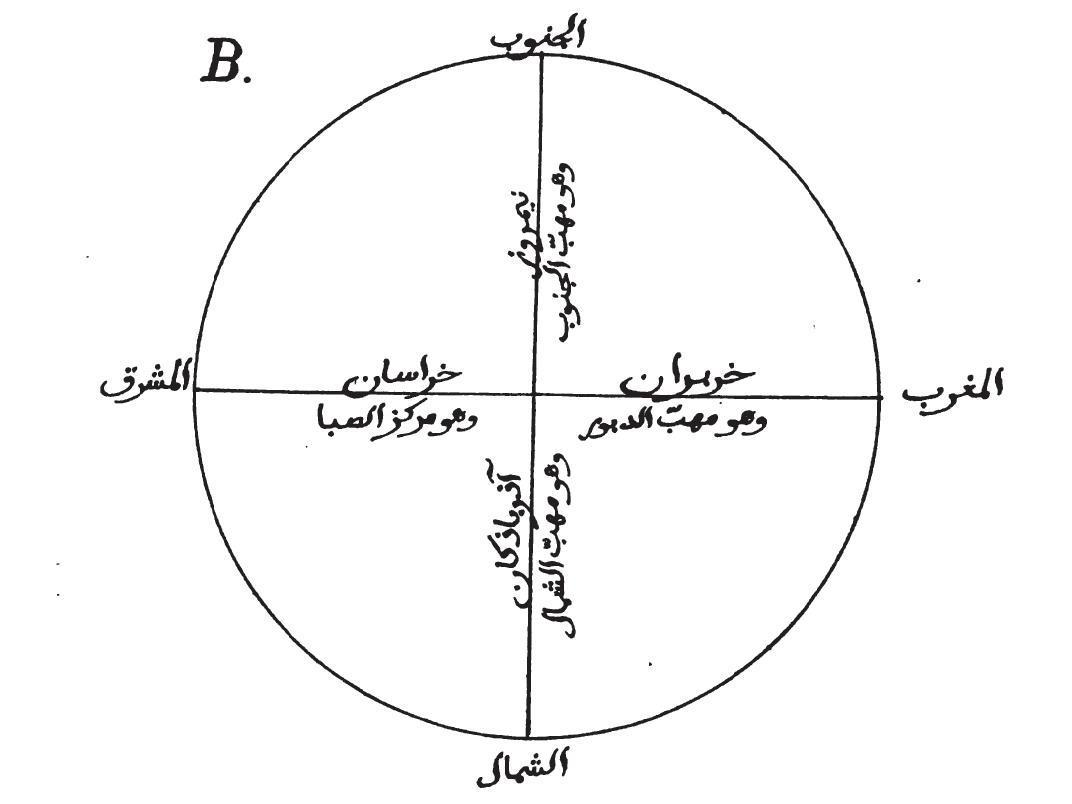
Four directions and political divisions of Iran by Abū Rayḥān al-Bīrūnī

Bīrūnī devised a novel method of determining the Earth's radius by means of the observation of the height of a mountain. He carried it out at Nandana in Pind Dadan Khan (present-day Pakistan). He used trigonometry to calculate the radius of the Earth using measurements of the height of a hill and measurement of the dip in the horizon from the top of that hill. Sparavigna writes that his calculated radius for the Earth of 3928.77 miles was 2% higher than the actual mean radius of 3847.80 miles. His estimate was given as 12,803,337 cubits, so the accuracy of his estimate compared to the modern value depends on what conversion is used for cubits. The exact length of a cubit is not clear; with an 18-inch cubit his estimate would be 3,600 miles, whereas with a 22-inch cubit his estimate would be 4,200 miles. One significant problem with this approach is that Al-Biruni was not aware of atmospheric refraction and made no allowance for it. He used a dip angle of 34 arc minutes in his calculations, but refraction can typically alter the measured dip angle by about 1/6, making his calculation only accurate to within about 20% of the true value.

Diagram illustrating a method proposed and used by Al-Biruni to estimate the radius and circumference of the Earth

It is also proposed that Al-Biruni 'discovered' the Americas, but this is contested. Bill Scheppler states that Al-Biruni did not believe in the existence of the Americas, like other geographers of his time. Instead, he thought that Europe and Asia were separated by a enormous sea that was too dangerous to attempt navigation through. This view is challenged by Frederick Starr, who argues Al-Biruni theorized the existence of a landmass along the vast ocean between Asia and Europe. According to Starr, Al-Biruni argued in a lost passage that the forces which caused Africa and Eurasia to form must have caused some other continent to form in the area of the Americas. He also believed these lands could have been inhabited. However, Nathan Sidoli states that even if Starr is correct, the fact he hypnotezied its existence does not mean he 'discovered' it. She states by analogy that Copernicus hypothesizing the Earth orbits the Sun does not mean he 'discovered' this.

== Pharmacology and mineralogy ==
Biruni wrote a pharmacopoeia, the Book on the Pharmacopoeia of Medicine (Arabic: كتاب الصيدنة في الطب, romanized: Kitab al-saydala fi al-tibb (Kitab al-saydala fi al-tibb). It lists synonyms for drug names in Syriac, Persian, Greek, Baluchi, Afghan, Kurdish, and some Indian languages.

He also used his hydrostatic balance to determine the density and purity of metals and precious stones, and classified gems by what he considered their primary physical properties, such as specific gravity and hardness, rather than the common practice of the time of classifying them by colour.

== History and chronology ==
Biruni's main essay on political history, Book of nightly conversation concerning the affairs of Khārazm (Persian: کتاب گفتگوهای شبانه درباره‌ی اخبار خوارزم, romanized: Ketāb-e Goftogūhā-ye Shabāne darbāreye Aḵhbār-e Ḵhārazm; Arabic: Kitāb al-musāmara fī aḵbār Ḵᵛārazm) is now known only from quotations in Bayhaqi's Tārīkh-e Masʿūdī. In addition to this, various discussions of historical events and methodology are found in connection with the lists of kings in his al-Āthār al-bāqiya and in the Qānūn, as well as elsewhere in the Āthār, in India, and scattered throughout his other works. The Chronology of Ancient Nations in particular attempted to accurately establish the length of various historical eras.

== History of religions ==
Biruni is widely considered to be one of the most important Muslim authorities on the history of religion. He is known as a pioneer in the field of comparative religion in his study of, among other creeds, Zoroastrianism, Judaism, Hinduism, Christianity, Buddhism and Islam. He assumed the superiority of Islam: "We have here given an account of these things in order that the reader may learn by the comparative treatment of the subject how much superior the institutions of Islam are, and how more plainly this contrast brings out all customs and usages, differing from those of Islam, in their essential foulness." However he was happy on occasion to express admiration for other cultures, and quoted directly from the sacred texts of other religions when reaching his conclusions. He strove to understand them on their own terms rather than trying to prove them wrong. His underlying concept was that all cultures are at least distant relatives of all other cultures because they are all human constructs. "Rather, what Al-Biruni seems to be arguing is that there is a common human element in every culture that makes all cultures distant relatives, however foreign they might seem to one another."

Al-Biruni divides Hindus into an educated and an uneducated class. He describes the educated as monotheistic, believing that God is one, eternal, and omnipotent and eschewing all forms of idol worship. He recognizes that uneducated Hindus worshiped a multiplicity of idols yet points out that even some Muslims (such as the Jabriyah) have adopted anthropomorphic concepts of God.

== Anthropology ==
Al-Biruni wrote about the peoples, customs and religions of the Indian subcontinent. According to Akbar S. Ahmed, like modern anthropologists, he engaged in extensive participant observation with a given group of people, learnt their language and studied their primary texts, presenting his findings with objectivity and neutrality using cross-cultural comparisons. Ahmed concluded that Al-Biruni can be considered as the first anthropologist; others, however, have argued that he can hardly be considered an anthropologist in the conventional sense.

== Indology ==
Biruni's fame as an Indologist rests primarily on two texts. The first is his encyclopedic work on India, Taḥqīq mā li-l-Hind min maqūlah maqbūlah fī al-ʿaql aw mardhūlah (variously translated as Verifying All That the Indians Recount, the Reasonable and the Unreasonable, or The book confirming what pertains to India, whether rational or despicable), in which he explored nearly every aspect of Indian life; the second is his translation of the yoga sutras of the Indian sage Patanjali, under the title Tarjamat ketāb Bātanjalī fi’l-ḵalāṣ men al-ertebāk.

During his journey through India, military and political history were not Biruni's main focus: he decided rather to document the civilian and scholarly aspects of Hindu life, examining culture, science, and religion. He explored religion within a rich cultural context. He expressed his objectives with simple eloquence:

I shall not produce the arguments of our antagonists in order to refute such of them, as I believe to be in the wrong. My book is nothing but a simple historic record of facts. I shall place before the reader the theories of the Hindus exactly as they are, and I shall mention in connection with them similar theories of the Greeks in order to show the relationship existing between them.

An example of Biruni's analysis is his summary of why many Hindus hate Muslims. Biruni notes in the beginning of his book how the Muslims had a hard time learning about Hindu knowledge and culture. He explains that Hinduism and Islam are totally different from each other. Moreover, Hindus in 11th century India had suffered waves of destructive attacks on many of its cities, and Islamic armies had taken numerous Hindu slaves to Persia, which – claimed Biruni – contributed to Hindus becoming suspicious of all foreigners, not just Muslims. Hindus considered Muslims violent and impure, and did not want to share anything with them. Over time, Biruni won the welcome of Hindu scholars. Al-Biruni collected books and studied with these Hindu scholars to become fluent in Sanskrit, discover and translate into Arabic the mathematics, science, medicine, astronomy and other fields of arts as practiced in 11th-century India. He was inspired by the arguments offered by Indian scholars who believed earth must be globular in shape, which they felt was the only way to fully explain the difference in daylight hours by latitude, seasons and Earth's relative positions with Moon and stars. At the same time, Biruni was also critical of Indian scribes, who he believed carelessly corrupted Indian documents while making copies of older documents. He also criticized the Hindus on what he saw them do and not do, for example finding them deficient in curiosity about history and religion.

One of the specific aspects of Hindu life that Biruni studied was the Hindu calendar. His scholarship on the topic exhibited great determination and focus, not to mention the excellence in his approach of the in-depth research he performed. He developed a method for converting the dates of the Hindu calendar to the dates of the three different calendars that were common in the Islamic countries of his time period, the Greek, the Arab/Muslim, and the Persian. Biruni also employed astronomy in the determination of his theories, which were complex mathematical equations and scientific calculations that allows one to convert dates and years between the different calendars.

The book does not limit itself to tedious records of battle because Biruni found the social culture to be more important. The work includes research on a vast array of topics of Indian culture, including descriptions of their traditions and customs. Although he tried to stay away from political and military history, Biruni did indeed record important dates and noted actual sites of where significant battles occurred. Additionally, he chronicled stories of Indian rulers and told of how they ruled over their people with their beneficial actions and acted in the interests of the nation. His details are brief and mostly just list rulers without referring to their real names, and he did not go on about deeds that each one carried out during their reign, which keeps in line with Biruni's mission to try to stay away from political histories. Biruni also described the geography of India in his work. He documented different bodies of water and other natural phenomena. These descriptions are useful to today's modern historians because they are able to use Biruni's scholarship to locate certain destinations in modern-day India. Historians are able to make some matches while also concluding that certain areas seem to have disappeared and been replaced with different cities. Different forts and landmarks were able to be located, legitimizing Biruni's contributions with their usefulness to even modern history and archeology.

The dispassionate account of Hinduism given by Biruni was remarkable for its time. He stated that he was fully objective in his writings, remaining unbiased like a proper historian should. Biruni documented everything about India just as it happened. But, he did note how some of the accounts of information that he was given by natives of the land may not have been reliable in terms of complete accuracy, however, he did try to be as honest as possible in his writing. Eduard Sachau compares it to "a magic island of quiet, impartial research in the midst of a world of clashing swords, burning towns, and plundered temples." Biruni's writing was very poetic, which may diminish some of the historical value of the work for modern times. The lack of description of battle and politics makes those parts of the picture completely lost. However, many have used Biruni's work to check facts of history in other works that may have been ambiguous or had their validity questioned.

== Religious views ==
Biruni, as a Muslim critical thinker, integrated in his studies between 'aql (reason) and naql (revelation).

Al-Biruni did not say whether he was Sunni or Shia; rather, he only identified as a Muslim. According to historian Walter J. Fischel, Al-Biruni was "the greatest Muslim Hebraist".

According to Yasir Qadhi, Al-Biruni was "not pro-Hadith" and was "sceptical of the Hadith". Al-Biruni rejected hadiths which contradicted science. For example, his rejection of the fasting hadith on Ashura, which is reported in Sahih al-Bukhari, was based on historical and scientific reasoning, indicating a critical approach to hadith where he found contradictions with verifiable facts. Al-Biruni used astronomical and historical calculations to argue that the 10th of Muharram (Ashura) could not have coincided with the Jewish day of Atonement (Yom Kippur, 10th of Tishri) in the second year of the Hijra, as suggested by some hadiths. He noted that the dates could not have fallen on the same day, thus the premise of the hadith that the prophet Muhammad fasted because the Jews did was historically and astronomically flawed.

Al-Biruni counted as "caliphs" Abu Bakr, Umar ibn al-Khattab, Uthman ibn Affan, Ali ibn Abi Talib, and Hasan ibn Ali; the Umayyads were designated as "kings", the Abbasids as "imams". Al-Biruni defended the Mu'tazilites against a slanderous misrepresentation of their doctrines. He was critical of Sufism.

Al-Biruni was as unequivocal in rejecting beliefs unacceptable to Muslims as he is in condemning unfair criticism of other faiths, such as Christianity. Though he criticised the Trinity, he believed that the Tawrat and Injeel use the words "father" and "son" in a metaphorical, as well as a literal, sense.

== Works ==
Most of the works of Al-Biruni are in Arabic, the scientific language of his age, although he seemingly wrote the Kitab al-Tafhim in both Persian and Arabic, showing his mastery over both languages. The al-Tafhim is one of the most important of the early works of science in Persian and is a rich source for Persian prose and lexicography, covering the Quadrivium in a detailed and skilled fashion.

Bīrūnī's catalogue of his own literary production up to his 65th lunar/63rd solar year (the end of 427/1036) lists 103 titles divided into 12 categories: astronomy, mathematical geography, mathematics, astrological aspects and transits, astronomical instruments, chronology, comets, an untitled category, astrology, anecdotes, religion, and books he no longer possesses.

=== Selection of works ===
- Taḥqīq mā li-l-Hind (A Critical Study of What India Says, Whether Accepted by Reason or Refused; تحقيق ما للهند من مقولة معقولة في العقل أو مرذولة), popularly called Kitāb al-Hind (The Book on India); English translations called Indica or Alberuni's India. The work is a compendium of India's religion and philosophy.
- The Remaining Signs of Past Centuries (Kitāb al-Āthār al-Bāqīyah ‘an al-Qurūn al-Khālīyah; الآثار الباقية عن القرون الخالية), a comparative study of the calendars of cultures and civilizations (including several chapters on Christian cults), containing mathematical, astronomical and historical information.
- The Mas'udi Canon (قانون مسعودي), an encyclopaedia of astronomy, geography, and engineering, dedicated to Mas'ud, son of the Ghaznavid sultan Mahmud of Ghazni.
- Kitab al-tafhim li-awa’il sina‘at al-tanjim (Book of Instruction in the Elements of the Art of Astrology, also translated as Understanding Astrology; التفهيم لصناعة التنجيم), a question-and-answer book on mathematics and astronomy, written in Persian and Arabic.
- Kitab al-saydala fi al-tibb (Book on the Pharmacopoeia of Medicine), a work on drugs and medicines.
- Gems (الجماهر في معرفة الجواهر), a geology manual about minerals and gems, dedicated to Mawdud, son of Mas'ud.
- Tarjamat ketāb Bātanjalī fi’l-ḵalāṣ men al-ertebāk, an Arabic rendering of the yoga sutras of Patanjali.
- A history of Mahmud of Ghazni and his father.
- Kitāb al-musāmara fī aḵbār Ḵᵛārazm (Book of nightly conversation concerning the affairs of Ḵᵛārazm), a history of Khwarazm, now known only from quotations.
- Miftāḥ ʿilm al-hayʾa (Key to Astronomy), no longer extant.
- Risālah li-al-Bīrūnī (Epître de Berūnī).

== Legacy ==
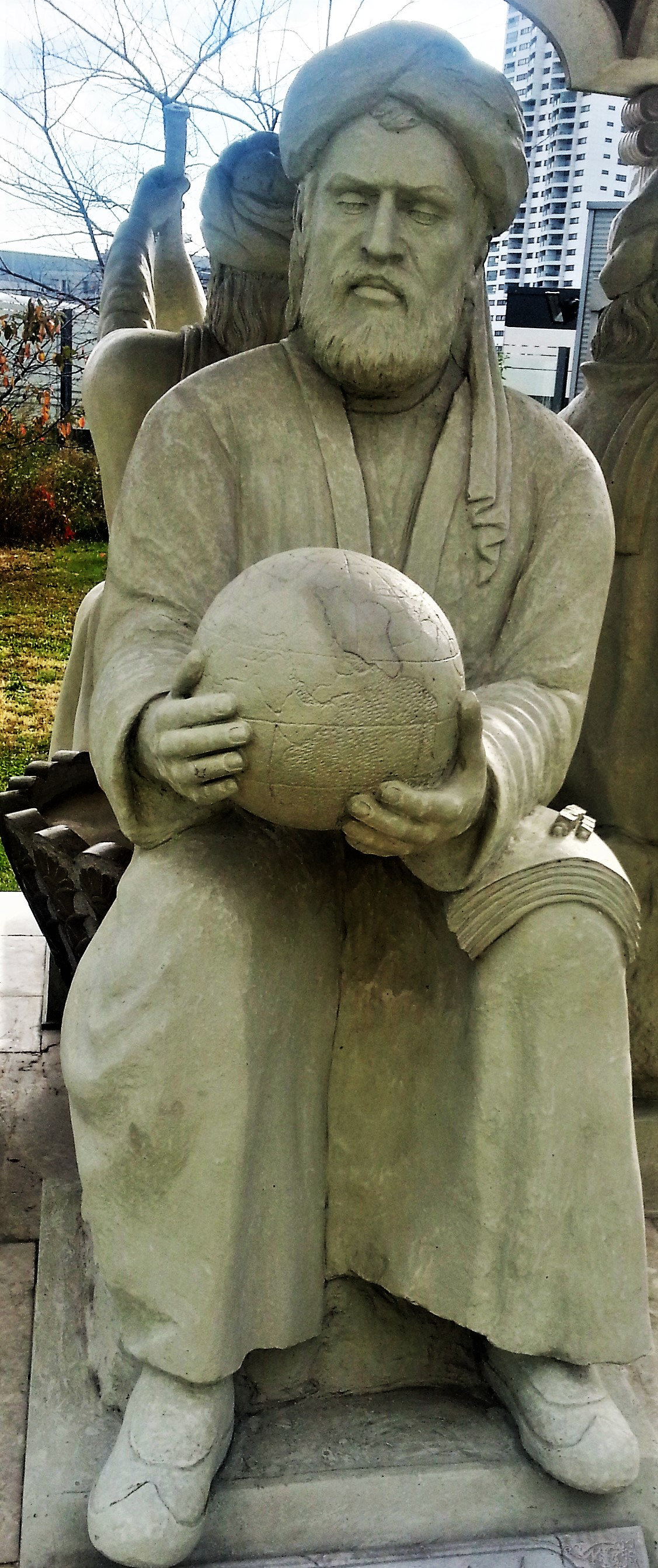
The statue of Al-Biruni in United Nations Office in Vienna

Following Al-Biruni's death, his work was neither built upon nor referenced by scholars. Centuries later, his writings about India, which had become of interest to the British Raj, were revisited.

The lunar crater Al-Biruni and the asteroid 9936 Al-Biruni are named in his honour. Biruni Island in Antarctica is named after al-Biruni. In Iran, surveying engineers are celebrated on al-Biruni's birthday.

In June 2009, Iran donated a pavilion to the United Nations Office in Vienna, placed in the central Memorial Plaza of the Vienna International Center. Named the Scholars Pavilion, it features the statues of four prominent Iranian scholars: Avicenna, Abu Reyhan Biruni, Zakariya Razi (Rhazes) and Omar Khayyam.

=== In popular culture ===
A film about the life of Al-Biruni, Abu Raykhan Beruni, was released in the Soviet Union in 1974.

Irrfan Khan portrayed Al-Biruni in the 1988 Doordarshan historical drama Bharat Ek Khoj. He has been portrayed by Cüneyt Uzunlar in the Turkish television series Alparslan: Büyük Selçuklu on TRT 1.

== Sources ==
- Ahmed, Akbar S. (1984). "Al-Beruni: The First Anthropologist". RAIN (60). Royal Anthropological Institute of Great Britain and Ireland: 9–10. doi:10.2307/3033407. JSTOR 3033407.
- Akhtar, Zia (2011). "Constitutional legitimacy: Sharia law, secularism and the social compact". Indonesia Law Review. 2 (1): 107–127. doi:10.15742/ilrev.v1n2.84. S2CID 153637958.
- Alikuzai, Hamid Wahed (2013). A Concise History of Afghanistan in 25 Volumes. Vol. 1. Trafford Publishing. ISBN 978-1-4907-1446-2.
- Anawati, Georges C. (2000). "Bīrūnī, Abū Rayḥān v. Pharmacology and Mineralogy". Encyclopædia Iranica.
- Ataman, Kemal (2005). "Re-Reading al-Biruni's India: a Case for Intercultural Understanding". Islam and Christian-Muslim Relations. 16 (2). Routledge: 141–154. doi:10.1080/09596410500059623. S2CID 143545645.
- Ataman, Kemal (2008). Understanding Other Religions: Al-Biruni's and Gadamer's "Fusion of Horizons". Cultural Heritage and Contemporary Change. Washington, D.C.: The Council for Research in Values and Philosophy. ISBN 978-1-56518-252-3.
- Berjak, Rafik; Muzaffar, Iqbal (2003). "Ibn Sina--Al-Biruni correspondence". Islam & Science. 1 (1): 91 – via Gale Academic OneFile.
- al-Biruni; Sachau, Eduard (1910). Sachau, Eduard (ed.). Alberuni's India: An Account of the Religion, Philosophy, Literature, Geography, Chronology, Astronomy, Customs, Laws and Astrology of India about A.D. 1030. London: Kegan Paul, Trench, Trubner & Co. OCLC 1039522051.(volume 1; volume 2)
- de Blois, François (2000). "Bīrūnī, Abū Rayḥān: vii. History of Religion". Encyclopædia Iranica.
- Bosworth, C. Edmund (2000). "Bīrūnī, Abū Rayḥān". Encyclopædia Iranica.
- Covington, Richard (2007). "Rediscovering Arabic Science". Aramco World. Vol. 58, no. 3.>
- Gulyamova, Lola (2022). The Geography of Uzbekistan: At the Crossroads of the Silk Road. Springer Nature. ISBN 978-30310-7-873-6.
- Hannam, James (2009). God's Philosophers: How the Medieval World Laid the Foundations of Modern Science. London: Icon. ISBN 978-1-84831-150-3.
- Hodgson, Marshall G. S. (1974). The Venture of Islam: Conscience and History in a World Civilization. Vol. 2: The Expansion of Islam in the Middle Periods. Chicago: University of Chicago Press. ISBN 978-0-226-34677-9.
- Huth, John Edward (2013). The Lost Art of Finding Our Way. Cambridge, Massachusetts: Harvard University Press. ISBN 978-0-674-07282-4.
- Levey, Martin (1973). Early Arabic Pharmacology: An Introduction Based on Ancient and Medieval Sources. Brill Archive. ISBN 978-90-04-03796-0.
- Kamaruzzaman, Kamar Oniah (2003). "Al-Biruni: Father of Comparative Religion". Intellectual Discourse. 11 (2).
- Kaminski, Joseph J. (2017). The Contemporary Islamic Governed State: A Reconceptualization. Palgrave Series in Islamic Theology, Law, and History. Cham, Switzerland: Palgrave Macmillan. pp. 31–70. doi:10.1007/978-3-319-57012-9_2. ISBN 978-33195-7-011-2.
- Kennedy, E.S.; Engle, Susan; Wamstad, Jeanne (1965). "The Hindu Calendar as Described in Al-Biruni's Masudic Canon". Journal of Near Eastern Studies. 24 (3): 274–284. doi:10.1086/371821. S2CID 161208100.
- Kennedy, Edward Stewart (1975). "The Exact Sciences". In Frye, R. N.; Fisher, William Bayne (eds.). The Cambridge History of Iran. Vol. 4. Cambridge: Cambridge University Press. ISBN 978-0-521-20093-6.
- Khan, M.S. (1976). "Al-Biruni and the Political History of India". Oriens. 25/26: 86–115. doi:10.1163/18778372-02502601007. ISSN 0078-6527.
- Kraus, Paul, ed. (1936). Epître de Beruni contenant le répertoire des ouvrages de Muhammad b. Zakariya ar-Razi (in French). Paris: J.P. Maisonneuve. OCLC 1340409059.
- Kujundzić, E.; Masić, I. (1999). "Al-Biruni—a universal scientist". Medical Archives (in Croatian). 53 (2): 117–120. PMID 10386051.
- Lawrence, Bruce B. (2000). "Bīrūnī, Abū Rayḥān: viii. Indology". Encyclopædia Iranica.
- MacKenzie, D. N. (2000). "Chorasmia: iii. The Chorasmian Language". Encyclopædia Iranica.
- Nasr, Seyyed Hossein (1993). An Introduction to Islamic Cosmological Doctrines: Conceptions of Nature and Methods used for its Study by the Ikhwān al-Ṣafāʾ, al-Bīrūnī, and Ibn Sīnā (2nd ed.). Albany, New York: State University of New York Press. ISBN 978-07914-1-515-3.
- Noonan, George C. (2005). Classical Scientific Astrology. Tempe, Arizona: American Federation of Astrologers. ISBN 978-0-86690-049-2.
- Papan-Matin, Firoozeh (2010). Beyond Death: The Mystical Teachings of ʻAyn Al-Quḍāt Al-Hamadhānī. Brill Publishers. ISBN 978-90-04-17413-9.
- Pines, S. (1964). "The Semantic Distinction between the Terms Astronomy and Astrology according to al-Biruni". Isis. 55 (3). Chicago: The University of Chicago Press: 343–349. doi:10.1086/349868. ISSN 1545-6994. JSTOR 228577. S2CID 143941055.
- Pingree, David (2000a). "Bīrūnī, Abū Rayḥān: ii. Bibliography". Encyclopædia Iranica.
- Pingree, David (2000b). "Bīrūnī, Abū Rayḥān: iv. Geography". Encyclopædia Iranica.
- Pingree, David (2000c). "Bīrūnī, Abū Rayḥān: vi. History and Chronology". Encyclopædia Iranica.
- Rozhanskaya, Mariam; Levinova, I. S. (1996). "Statics". In Rushdī, Rāshid (ed.). Encyclopedia of the History of Arabic Science. Psychology Press. pp. 274–298. ISBN 978-0-415-12411-9.
- Saliba, George (1982). "Al-Biruni". In Strayer, Joseph (ed.). Dictionary of the Middle Ages. Vol. 2. New York: Charles Scribner's Sons. ISBN 978-06841-9-073-0.
- Saliba, George (2000). "Bīrūnī, Abū Rayḥān:iii. Mathematics and Astronomy". Encyclopædia Iranica.
- Scheppler, Bill (2006). Al-Biruni: Master Astronomer and Muslim Scholar of the Eleventh Century. Great Muslim Philosophers and Scientists of the Middle Ages. New York: Rosen Publishing Group. ISBN 978-1-4042-0512-3.
- Sparavigna, Amelia (2013). "The Science of Al-Biruni". International Journal of Sciences. 2 (12): 52–60. arXiv:1312.7288. doi:10.18483/ijSci.364. S2CID 119230163.
- Stephenson, F. Richard (2008) [1997]. Historical Eclipses and Earth's Rotation. Cambridge: Cambridge University Press. ISBN 978-0-521-05633-5.
- Strohmaier, Gotthard (2006). "Biruni". In Meri, Josef W. (ed.). Medieval Islamic Civilization: A-K, index. Taylor & Francis. ISBN 978-0-415-96691-7.
- Stone, Richard (2014). ""Was America 'discovered' in medieval Central Asia?"". Seience. 344 (6190). doi:10.1126/science.344.6190.1331.
- Tapper, Richard (1995). ""Islamic Anthropology" and the "Anthropology of Islam"". Anthropological Quarterly. 68 (3): 185–193. doi:10.2307/3318074. ISSN 0003-5491. JSTOR 3318074.
- Vibert, Douglas A. (1973). "Al-Biruni, Persian Scholar, 973–1048". Journal of the Royal Astronomical Society of Canada. 67: 209–211. Bibcode:1973JRASC..67..209D. ISSN 0035-872X.
- Verdon, Noémie (2015). "Cartography and Cultural Identity: Conceptualisation of al-Hind by Arabic and Persian writers". In Ray, Himanshu Prabha (ed.). Negotiating Cultural Identity: Landscapes in Early Medieval South Asian History. Archaeology and Religion in South Asia. Routledge. ISBN 978-1-317-34130-7.
- Curtis, Vesta Sarkhosh; Stewart, Sarah (2009). The Rise of Islam: The Idea of Iran Vol 4. I.B. Tauris. ISBN 978-1845116910.
- Waardenburg, Jacques, ed. (1999). Muslim Perceptions of Other Religions: A Historical Survey. Oxford: Oxford University Press. ISBN 978-0-19-535576-5.
- Watt, William Montgomery; Said, Hakim M. (1979). Al-Bīrūnī and the Study of Non-Islamic Religions. OCLC 278693104.
- Yano, Michio (2013). "al-Bīrūnī". In Fleet, Kate; Krämer, Gudrun; Matringe, Denis; Nawas, John; Rowson, Everett (eds.). Encyclopaedia of Islam (3rd ed.). Brill Online. ISSN 1873-9830.
- Starr, S. Frederick (2023). The Genius of their Age: Ibn Sina, Biruni, and the Lost Enlightenment. Oxford University Press.
