= Al-Biruni (crater) =

Lunar crater

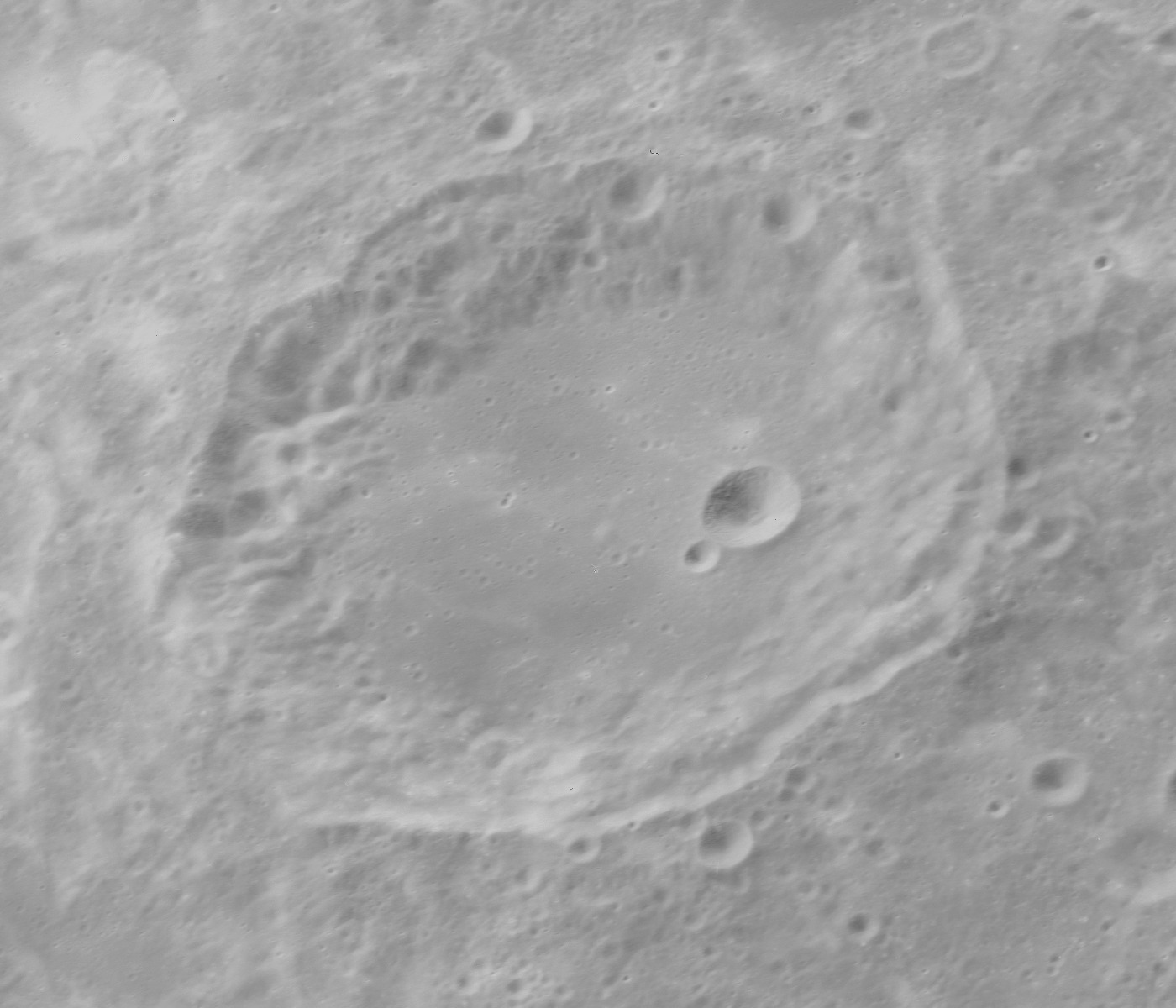
- Oblique Apollo 16 image
- Coordinates: 17.9°N 92.5°E
- Diameter: 80.41 km
- Depth: unknown
- Colongitude: 268° at sunrise
- Formation: Early Imbrian
- Eponym: Al-Biruni

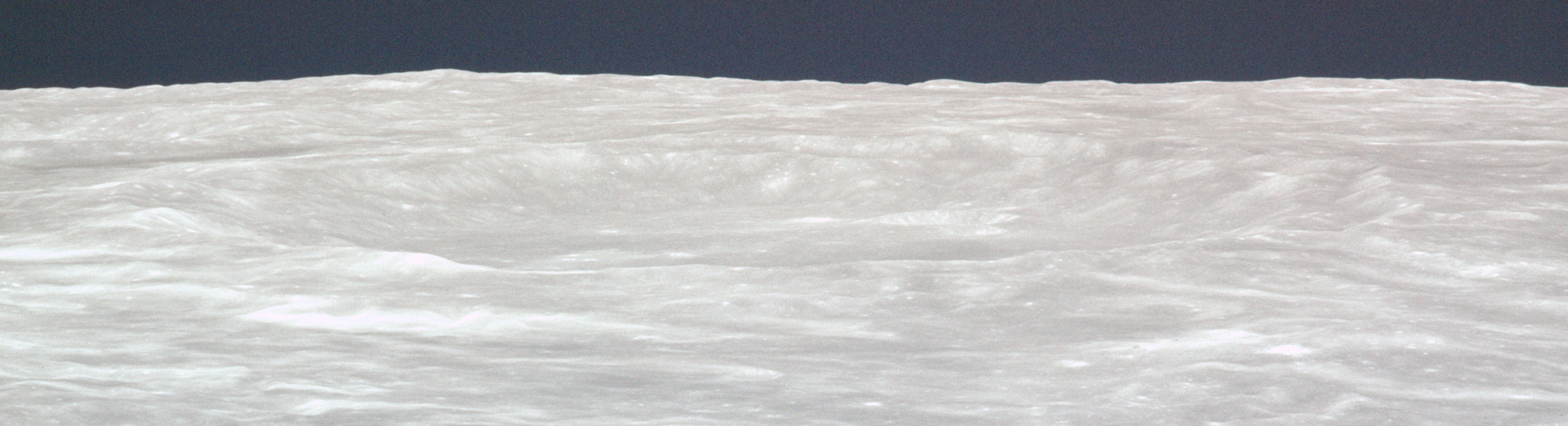
Oblique view of Al-Biruni crater facing north, from Apollo 17

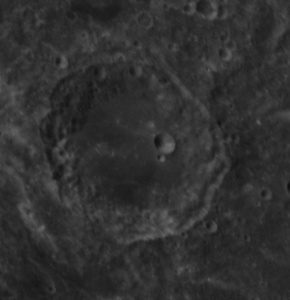
Oblique Apollo 14 Hasselblad camera image

Al-Biruni is an impact crater that lies on the far side of the Moon, just beyond the eastern limb. This portion of the surface is sometimes brought into sight due to librations of the Moon, but due to its location the crater is viewed from the side. Al-Biruni lies to the south of the crater Joliot, and to the northeast of Goddard. It is located well within the "putative Orientale antipodal ejecta deposit".

This impact crater dates from the Early Imbrian epoch at around 3.8±0.1 ga ago. The interior floor was covered in mare lava material during the Late Imbrian. The rim of Al-Biruni forms a somewhat irregular circle, with a slight outward bulge in the northeast wall, and a somewhat wider inner wall to the west. The mare-covered interior floor is relatively planar, with a few tiny smaller craters to mark the surface. The most notable of these is Al-Biruni C near the northeast wall. A topographic profile of the interior floor shows a slight incline with an angle of about 2.5°. The floor surface displays high abundances of FeO and TiO_{2}.

This crater is named after the Persian scientist Al-Biruni (c. 973 – c. 1050). Its designation was formally adopted by the International Astronomical Union in 1970.

== Satellite craters ==
By convention these features are identified on lunar maps by placing the letter on the side of the crater midpoint that is closest to Al-Biruni.

Al-Biruni	Latitude	Longitude	Diameter
C	18.4° N	93.0° E	9 km

== See also ==
- 9936 Al-Biruni, asteroid
