= Ghaznavid conquest of Khwarazm =

Ghaznavid conquest of Khwarazm (1017)

Ghaznavid-Ma'munid war
- Khwarazm before Mongol invasion
Date	1017 AD
Location	Khwarazm, Uzbekistan
Result	Ghaznavid victory
Territorial changes	Khwarazm annexed by Ghaznavids

Belligerents
Ghaznavids	Ma'munids

Commanders and leaders
Mahmud of Ghazni; Muhammad at-Ta’i; Altuntash; Arslan Jadhib	Ma'mun II X Khumar Tash (POW); Alptigin Bukhari (POW)

Strength
100,000 cavalry 500 elephants	50,000

In 1017 AD Mahmud of Ghazni conquered the region of Khwarazm. In 995 AD, Ma'mun I annexed Khwarazm, defeating Abu 'Abdallah Muhammad. After his assassination in 997 AD, his sons Abu al-Hasan Ali and Abu'l-Abbas Ma'mun ruled successively. Abu'l Abbas, under pressure, recognized Ghaznavid Sultan Mahmud's suzerainty, sparking a mutiny that led to his assassination in March 1017. Mahmud invaded, defeated the rebels in July 1017, and captured the capital of Urganj. (Note: Also known as Jurjāniyyah)

== Background ==
Initially the Ma'munids were under the authority of the Samanids. In 995 AD, Ma'mun I, seeking to punish Abu 'Abdallah Muhammad, the Khwārazmshāh of Afrighid dynasty. (Note: Ruling from Kāth.) for his betrayal of Abu Ali Simjuri, launched an attack, captured him, and annexed the Afrighid kingdom of Khwarazm. Ma'munids became the new Khwarazmshah. Ma'mun was assassinated in 997 AD and was succeeded by his son, Abu al-Hasan Ali, who married Kah-Kāljī (Note: Hurra-yi Khuttali), sister of Sultan Mahmud. Abu al-Hasan Ali died in 1009 AD, and was succeeded by his brother, Abū'l-Abbās Ma'mūn also known as Ma'mun II. Abu'l-Abbas Ma'mun married Kah-Kāljī, his brother’s widow, and allied with Sultan Mahmud. Mahmud demanded Ma'mun II to read Khutba in his name. Ma'mun not wanting to acknowledge him as his overlord was forced to accept. When his army got the news it, hostility spread in his army. Possible revolts were only quelled through substantial payments of gold to the commanders. To avoid mutiny of his army and Sultan Mahmud's aggression, Ma'mun II tried to establish a secret alliance with the Kara-Khanid Khanate.

== Conquest ==
=== Conflict with Ma'mun II ===
After spies reported the attempt of secret alliance with Kara-Khanid Khanate, Mahmud marched to Balkh with a large army of 100,000 cavalry and 500 elephants. The Khans of Kara-Khanid Khanate intervened, persuaded Mahmud to return on the condition of Ma'mun acknowledging him as his suzerain. Ma'mun left with no choice decided to read Khutba in his name in the districts of Nasa and Farawah. The submission led outrage among the Khwarazmian army. The garrison under the command of Alptigin Bukhari viewing Ma'mun's acquiescence as a betrayal of national honor, they marched on the capital of Urganj. Their discontent escalated into a wave of violence, culminating in the assassination of Ma'mun on 17 March 1017 AD. Following his death, the rebels raised his son Abu'l-Harith Muhammad to the throne. Alptigin terrorised the region of Khwarazm for four months. Upon learning of his brother-in-law and vassal's murder, Sultan Mahmud resolved to invade Khwarazm to punish the perpetrators. He reportedly said, "We must seek vengeance for the blood of our brother-in-law." Prior to announcing his intentions, he secured the safe return of his sister and skilfully negotiated the neutrality of the Khans of Turkistan (Kara-Khanid Khanate) through diplomatic means. With these arrangements in place, he again marched toward Balkh at the head of his forces. The defenders arranged 50,000 troops for defence.

=== Final Conquest ===
Mahmud marched to Tirmidh, where he embarked his army on boats and sailed down the Oxus River to Khwarazm, targeting the capital, Gurganj. The initial engagement proved disastrous for the Sultan’s forces. His advance guard, led by Abu Abdu'llah Muhammad at-Ta’i, encamped on the edge of a desert, was ambushed by Khumar Tash during morning prayers and routed. This setback was swiftly countered by the Sultan’s bodyguard, who pursued, defeated, and captured Khumar Tash. The following day, Alptigin, leading a formidable Khwarazmian army, confronted the Sultan’s forces to halt their advance. On 3 July 1017, in a fierce battle the Khwarazmians were decisively defeated and scattered. With no further resistance, Sultan Mahmud entered Gurganj. The young Amir, along with several members of the Ma’munid family, was taken into custody.

== Aftermath ==
For the assassination of Ma'mun II, a severe reprisal followed. Alptigin and numerous other commanders were captured and subjected to brutal punishments, including lashing, dismemberment, gibbeting, or being trampled to death by war elephants. Their corpses were paraded to the streets, then hanged on the gibbets of the late amir, Ma'mun II. Arslan Jadhib was left to reduce the other parts of the country, as well as revolts. Altuntash was appointed in charge of Gurganj and Khwarazm with the title of Khawarazmshah. Mahmud marched back to Ghazni, while Khwarazm was incorporated in the Ghaznavid empire. Khwarazm was under Altuntash and his sons for 24 years. In a letter to the Kara-Khanids, Mahmud explained the motive of the conquest seeking "vengeance for the death of his brother-in-law."

== Bibliography ==
- Nazim, Muhammad (1931). The Life and Times of Sultan Mahmud of Ghazna. Cambridge University Press.
- Bosworth, C.E. (1963). The Ghaznavids, 994-1040. Edinburgh University Press.
- Frye, R.N. (1975). "The Early Ghaznavids". In Frye, Richard N. (ed.). The Cambridge History of Iran: From the Arab Invasion to the Saljuqs. Vol. 4. Cambridge: Cambridge University Press. pp. 162-198. ISBN 0-521-20093-8.
- Auer, Blain (2023). "Marriage, Political Alliance, and Imperial Polities in Early Ghaznavid History". Afghanistan. 6 (1). Edinburgh University Press: 1–28. doi:10.3366/afg.2023.0101. ISSN 2399-357X.
