= Hurra-yi Khuttali =

Ghaznavid princess (died after 1040)

- Spouse: Abu al-Hasan Ali (m. 1008; died 1009) Maʽmun II (m. 1015; died 1017)
- Dynasty: Ghaznavids
- Father: Sabuktigin

Hurra-yi Khuttali (Note: Also known as: Hurra-yi Kaliji (Persian: حره کلیجی) and Khuttali Khatun (Persian: ختلی خاتون).) (Persian: حره ختلی; fl. c. 1006 – c. 1040) was a princess from the Ghaznavid dynasty and the daughter of Sabuktigin, the ruler of Ghazna (now in Afghanistan). She was married to two Maʽmunid rulers of the Khwarazm region, Abu al-Hasan Ali and, after his death, his brother Maʽmun II. It is not known if she had any children with either of her husbands. Her marriages were a direct cause of the annexation of Khwarazm by her brother, Mahmud of Ghazni. In 1030, following Mahmud's death, she wrote a letter to her favourite nephew, Masʽud, urging him to claim the throne from his brother, Muhammad. After receiving her missive, Masʽud quickly marched to Ghazna and usurped the throne. Hurra's letter is considered the most prominent political act of a woman during the Ghaznavid era. She is last mentioned in 1040, leaving Ghazna for India; her ultimate fate is unknown.

== Name and sources ==
Hurra is an Arabic word meaning 'free woman'. It was most likely a laqab (honorific) conferred on Ghaznavid princesses. She used two nisbas (a part of an Arabic name that acts as an adjective, often referring to the individual's place of origin), Khuttali and Kaliji. (Note: The Iranian historian Shirin Bayani considers the two nisbas to refer to different persons. Meisami and Bosworth both confirm that Hurra-yi Khuttali and Hurra-yi Kaliji were one person.) According to the British orientalist Clifford Edmund Bosworth, Khuttali may have referred to an earlier Ghaznavid marital alliance with the Principality of Khuttal, located in central Asia. Another variation of her name is Khuttali Khatun, recorded by Persian historian Shabankara'i (c. 1298 – c. 1358). (Note: Khatun was a title bestowed on the wives and female relatives of the Turkic rulers.)

The only primary source that sparsely records Hurra's life is Tarikh-i Bayhaqi by Abuʽl-Fadhl Bayhaqi (d. 1077), a secretary in the court of Amir Masʽud of Ghazna (r. 1030–1040), Hurra's nephew. Khwarazmian polymath al-Biruni (973 – c. 1050) wrote a first-hand account on the history of Khwarazm, which has a few brief mentions of Hurra; only parts of the account have survived in the form of quotations in Bayhaqi's work.

== Biography ==
=== Early life and marriages ===
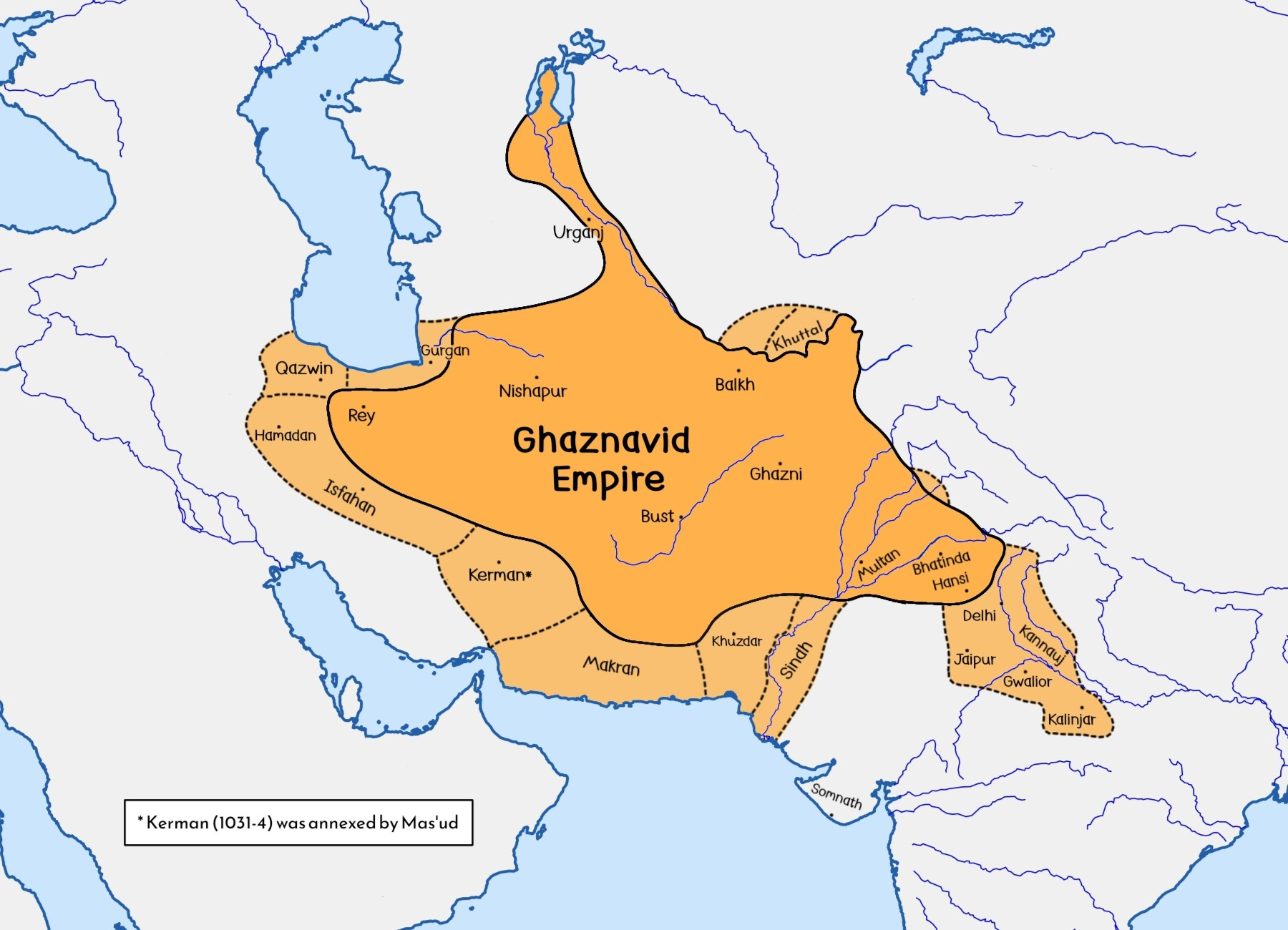
Map of the Ghaznavid empire during the reign of Mahmud, Hurra's brother

Hurra-yi Khuttali was a daughter of Sabuktigin, Amir of Ghazna (r. 977–997) and the progenitor of the Ghaznavids, a dynasty of Turkic origin whose realm included modern day Afghanistan, eastern Iran, Pakistan and northwestern India. Hurra's date and place of birth are unknown; Bosworth believes she may have been born in the region of Khuttalan (now in Tajikistan). According to Bosworth, she was distinguished from her sisters because of her intelligence and tactfulness, which gave her an influential role in governmental matters. In an era when education for women was restricted to only theology, she sought to learn other subjects. (Note: Bayhaqi records that the women of this era were able to learn and excel at musicianship and calligraphy.) She had a good relationship with her brother, Mahmud (r. 998–1030), and repeatedly sent him luxurious gifts. In 1008, Hurra married Abu al-Hasan Ali, ruler of Khwarazm (today in Uzbekistan and Turkmenistan) from the Maʽmunid dynasty. This marriage secured an alliance between the two realms, since the Maʽmunids feared that Mahmud might intend to annex Khwarazm.

Abu al-Hasan probably died in 1008/9 and was succeeded by his brother, Maʽmun II. He, with the same intent as his brother of securing an alliance, married Hurra in 1015/16. Mahmud demanded his new brother-in-law recognize him as his sovereign, which Maʽmun conceded. Maʽmun was killed during a rebellion in 1017, which arose in opposition to his submission. Mahmud sought retribution for the killing of his brother-in-law and part of his plan was to ostensibly employ his sister as a mediator. According to al-Biruni, Mahmud demanded the safe return of his sister, so that she could intercede between the two realms, while he prepared his army. His invasion was paused until Hurra was in Ghaznavid territory. When she was safely returned, he invaded Khwarazm in revenge and sacked its capital, Gurganj. It is not known if Hurra had any children with her two husbands.

=== Masʽud's ascension and later life ===
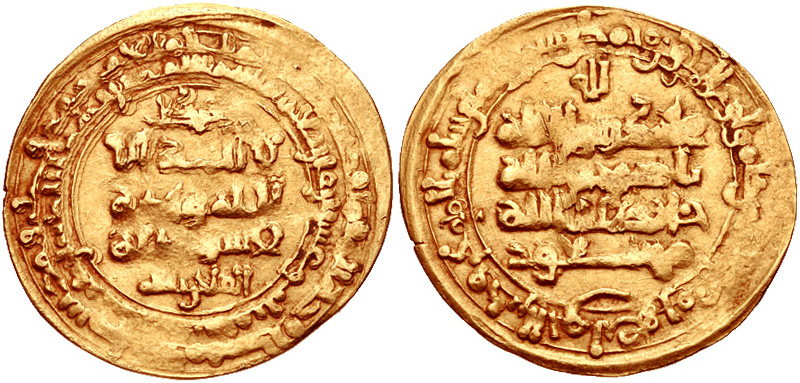
Coins of Masʽud I, Hurra's nephew

After her return to Ghazna, Hurra took on a more active role in the court. She acted as a spy for her favourite nephew, Masʽud, Mahmud's son, who was the governor of Herat. In 1030, after Mahmud's death, she was entrusted with the care of his widows and concubines from his harem. In his will, Mahmud named Masʽud's twin brother Muhammad as his successor. Hurra, her younger brother Yusuf ibn Sabuktigin, and the military commanders of the army considered Muhammad inept and unable to rule the Ghaznavid empire, which was dependent on the powerful leadership of the sultan. Therefore, Hurra wrote a letter to Masʽud, who was preoccupied with his military campaign in Isfahan, informing him of his father's death and encouraging him to take the throne. (Note: The text of the letter: "Our ruler Sultan Mahmud died in the afternoon of Thursday 23 Rabiʽ al-Awwal—may God have mercy on him—and the fortune of servants has come to an end. I and the women of the harem are all in the citadel of Ghazna. The day after tomorrow we will make known his death. At night the king was buried in the Pirouzi garden, while we still longed to see him, for we had not seen him for a week. Affairs are in the hands of Hajib Ali [Ali ibn Il-Arsalan Qarib]. After the burial, swift horsemen went that night to Guzganan so that your brother Muhammad might come here quickly and ascend the throne. The amir [Masʽud] knows that his brother is not equal to this great task; this house has many enemies, and we women and the treasuries are in great peril. He [Masʽud] must take charge of the affairs quickly, for he is his father's vali ahd (crown prince). He must not occupy himself with the region he has conquered or take any other. [...] [M]ake ready to come with all speed, so that neither the throne nor ourselves will be lost, send the messengers back quickly as your aunt is awaiting them anxiously. We will write to him of all that happens here.") Masʽud marched east and continued to receive letters from Hurra and his mother regarding the situation in Ghazna. In 1030, he arrived in the city and took the throne from his brother. He put Muhammad in prison and may have had him blinded. (Note: According to Bosworth, no primary sources (such as Bayhaqi and Gardizi) affirm that Muhammad was blinded by Masʽud. The claim only appears with later sources such as in the works of Firishta, Juzjani and Ibn al-Athir. Many Iranian exegetes of Bayhaqi's book, Tarikh-i Bayhaqi (e.g. Khalil Khatib Rahbar and Mohammad Dabirsiaghi) include Muhammad's blindness in Bayhaqi's account. German historian Bertold Spuler states that Masʼud blinded Muhammad to deprive him of his political influence.)

Masʽud lacked political shrewdness; Hurra is suspected to have influenced most of his decisions. She constantly warned him of the importance of Ghazna as the principal territory of the empire, the region of Khorasan being secondary. The region of Khorasan housed rich oases, centres of industry and crafts and important trade routes and it was an integral part of the empire. Masʽud was more interested in his conquests in India and neglected Khorasan. Meanwhile, Turkoman tribes under the leadership of the Seljuk dynasty began raiding the towns and the caravans of the region from the northern borders. Masʽud failed to provide protection in the region and eventually, the unsatisfied landowners of Khorasan surrendered themselves to the Turkomans. Masʽud attempted to suppress the raiders but was decisively defeated at the Battle of Dandanaqan (1040) and Khorasan was fully conquered by the Seljuks. According to Bayhaqi, when Masʽud and his army were retreating towards Ghazna, Hurra sent them clothes to cover themselves before entering the city. Fearful of an imminent invasion, Masʽud urged Hurra, his other aunts, and his mother to leave Ghazna with him for India. Bayhaqi's last mention of Hurra is her attempt at dissuading Masʽud from his plan. (Note: Masʽud told her in answer: "Let anyone who wishes to fall into the enemies' hands remain in Ghazna.") It is certain that she was with Masʽud's entourage when they were raided en route to India by rebels. Masʽud was killed and his throne was usurped by Muhammad, whose second sultanate ended in 1041 after he was dethroned by Masʽud's son, Mawdud. Hurra's ultimate fate is unknown.

== Assessments and historiography ==
Hurra's interference in Mahmud's succession was the most prominent instance of a woman openly partaking in the politics during the Ghaznavid period. Without the zeal of Hurra and the royal Ghaznavid women in recalling Masʽud he possibly would not have returned to claim the throne from his brother. Her letter, preserved in Bayhaqi's book, is the only surviving text from the Ghaznavid era written by a woman, and also one of the oldest surviving prose works of the Early New Persian language. Hurra displays her authority in her letter, her writing style is decisive and frequently uses the imperative mood, provoking her nephew's emotions and urging him to return with speed. Modern historian Soheila Amirsoleimani interprets her act of offering clothes to Masʽud's dilapidated army as metaphorically covering their shame. Both of these episodes present her as more powerful than Masʼud, since in Bayhaqi's work, advisors are always displayed as symbolically higher-ranking. Her warnings to Masʽud are likened to prophetic foretellings of destruction and ruin, a common trope in Bayhaqi's writing.

== Bibliography ==
- Amirsoleimani, Soheila (2009). "Women in Tārīkh-i Bayhaqī". Der Islam. 78 (2). Berlin: De Gruyter: 229–248. doi:10.1515/islm.2001.78.2.229. ISSN 1613-0928.
- Auer, Blain (2023). "Marriage, Political Alliance, and Imperial Polities in Early Ghaznavid History". Afghanistan. 6 (1). Edinburgh: Edinburgh University Press: 1–28. doi:10.3366/afg.2023.0101. ISSN 2399-357X.
- Boloix-Gallardo, Bárbara (2014). "Beyond the Ḥaram: Ibn al-Khaṭīb and His Privileged Knowledge of Royal Nasrid Women". Medieval Encounters. 20 (4–5). Leiden: E. J. Brill: 383–402. doi:10.1163/15700674-12342180. ISSN 1380-7854.
- Bosworth, Clifford Edmund (1963). The Ghaznavids: Their Empire in Afghanistan and Eastern Iran 994-1040. Edinburgh: Edinburgh University Press. ISBN 978-81-215-0573-4. OCLC 3601436.
- Bosworth, Clifford Edmund (1977). The Later Ghaznavids: Splendour and Decay: The Dynasty in Afghanistan and Northern India 1040-1186. Edinburgh: Edinburgh University Press. ISBN 978-81-215-0577-2. OCLC 912548799.
- Bosworth, Clifford Edmund (1981). "The Rulers of Chaghāniyān in Early Islamic Times". Iran. 19. London: British Institute of Persian Studies: 1–20. doi:10.2307/4299704. ISSN 0578-6967. JSTOR 4299704.
- Bosworth, Clifford Edmund (1998). "The Ghaznavids". In Bosworth, Clifford Edmund; Asimi, Muhammad (eds.). The Age of achievement, A.D. 750 to the End of the Fifteenth Century; Pt. I: the Historical, Social and Economic Setting. History of civilizations of Central Asia. Vol. 4. Paris: UNESCO Publishing. pp. 102–122. ISBN 978-92-3-103467-1. OCLC 773193034.
- Bosworth, Clifford Edmund (2001). "Ghaznavid". In Yarshater, Ehsan (ed.). Encyclopædia Iranica. Vol. X/6: Germany VI–Gindaros. London and New York: Routledge & Kegan Paul. pp. 578–583. ISBN 978-0-933273-55-9.
- Bosworth, Clifford Edmund (2008a) [1968]. "The Political and Dynastic History of the Iranian World (A.D. 1000–1217)". In Frye, R.N. (ed.). The Cambridge History of Iran: The Saljuq and Mongol Periods. The Cambridge History of Iran. Vol. 5. Cambridge: Cambridge University Press. pp. 1–202. doi:10.1017/CHOL9780521069366. ISBN 978-0-511-46776-9. OCLC 457145665.
- Bosworth, Clifford Edmund (2008b) [1975]. "The Early Ghaznavids". In Frye, R.N. (ed.). The Cambridge History of Iran: From the Arab invasion to the Saljuqs. The Cambridge History of Iran. Vol. 4. Cambridge: Cambridge University Press. pp. 162–197. doi:10.1017/CHOL9780521200936.006. ISBN 978-0-511-46776-9. OCLC 457145665.
- Bosworth, Clifford Edmund (2017). "Āl-e Maʾmūn". In Yarshater, Ehsan (ed.). Encyclopædia Iranica (Online ed.). Encyclopædia Iranica Foundation.
- Bearman, P.; Bianquis, Th.; Bosworth, Clifford Edmund; van Donzel, E.; Heinrichs, W.P. (2012). "Ism". Encyclopaedia of Islam, Second Edition. doi:10.1163/1573-3912_islam_SIM_3641.
- Boyle, J.A. (2012). "K̲h̲ātūn". Encyclopaedia of Islam, Second Edition. doi:10.1163/1573-3912_islam_SIM_4242.
- Forouzani, Seyyid Abu'l-Ghasem (2014). "حره ختلی" [Hurra-yeh Khuttali]. Encyclopaedia of the World of Islam (in Persian). Tehran. OCLC 1049714918.
- Mourad-Pour, Elham (2019). "بررسی نامه حره ختلی از تاریخ بیهقی بر اساس تحلیل گفتمان اعترافی )فمینیست(" [Review of the Horeh Khutali's Letter of Beyhaghi's History Based on the Analysis of the Confessional (Feminist) Discourse]. Ourmazd Literary (in Persian). 7 (50): 78–99. ISSN 2322-1364.
- Meisami, Julie Scott (2003). "Eleventh-Century Women: Evidence from Bayhaqi's History". In Nashat, Guity; Beck, Lois (eds.). Women in Iran from the Rise of Islam to 1800. Urbana: University of Illinois Press. pp. 80–103. ISBN 978-0-252-02839-7. OCLC 50960739.
- Pirouti, Khadijeh (2010). "موقعیت زنان در دوران غزنویان" [Women's Position During the Age of Ghaznavids]. Tarikh-eh Now (in Persian). 1 (1). Tehran: Tarbiat Modares University: 141–153. ISSN 2322-1941.
- Sahrai, Ghasem; Hasani Jalilian, Mohammad Reza (2010). "بیهقی و ماجرای کوری امیرمحمد غزنوی" [Beyhaghi and the Blindness of Amir Mohammad Ghaznavi]. Journal of Historical Researches (in Persian). 2 (3). S. l.: University of Isfahan: 77–92. ISSN 2476-3306. OCLC 1244446711.
- Spuler, Bertold (2015) [1952]. Hoyland, Robert G. (ed.). Iran in früh-islamischer Zeit. Politik, Kultur, Verwaltung und öffentliches Leben zwischen der arabischen und der seldschukischen Eroberung 633 bis 1055 [Iran in the Early Islamic Period: Politics, Culture, Administration and Public Life between the Arab and the Seljuk Conquests, 633–1055] (in German). Translated by Goldbloom, Gwendolin; Walburh, Berenike. Boston: Brill. ISBN 978-90-04-28209-4. OCLC 895257360.
