= Harun (Ghaznavid governor of Khwarazm) =

De facto ruler of Khwarazm from 1032 to 1035

- Shah

Khwarazmshah
- Reign: 1032–1035
- Predecessor: Altun Tash
- Successor: Ismail Khandan
- Died: 1035
- Father: Altun Tash
- Religion: Islam

Harun (died 1035) was the de facto ruler (later Shah) of Khwarazm from 1032 to 1035. He was the son of Altun Tash.

Following his father's death in 1032, Harun was effectively made governor of Khwarazm by the Ghaznavid sultan Mas'ud. The title of Khwarazm-Shah was not given to him, but to Mas'ud's son Sa'id; Mas'ud had been distrustful of Altun Tash and probably wanted to avoid giving his son too much power. In 1034, however, Harun revolted against Mas'ud, assuming the title of Khwarazm-Shah, and turned to the Ghaznavids' enemies, the Karakhanids of Samarkand and the Seljuks, for support. Mas'ud managed to put an end to this revolt by gaining the support of Harun's guards, who assassinated him. Khwarazm then fell to Harun's brother Ismail Khandan.

Preceded by Altun Tash	Ghaznavid Governor of Khwarazm; 1032–1035	Succeeded by Ismail Khandan
