= Abu Sahl 'Isa ibn Yahya al-Masihi =

Persian physician (d. 1010)

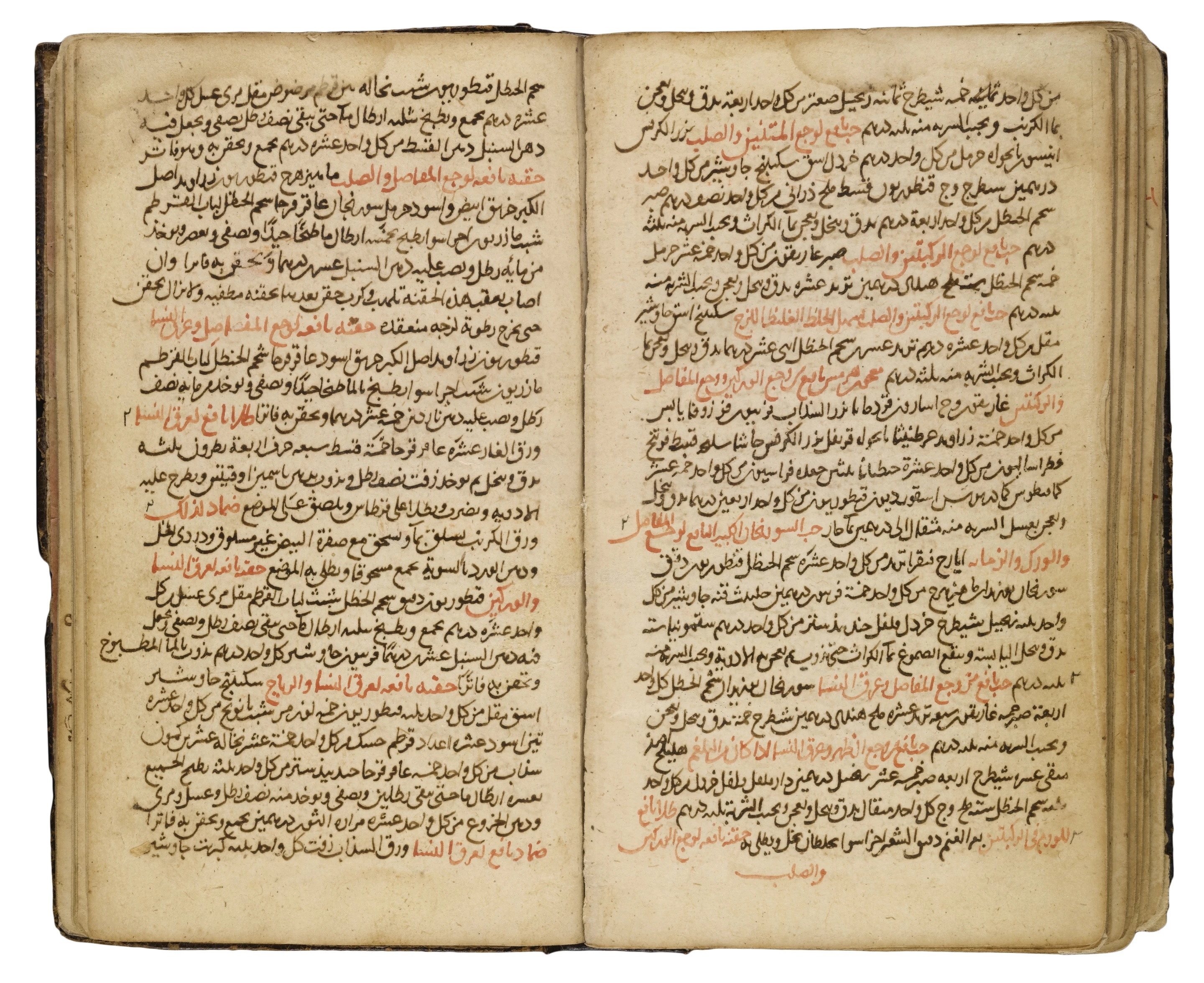
Article II of al-Masihi's Al-Tibb al-Kulli (a treatise on medicine). Copy created in western Iran or Anatolia, dated 1232-3

Abu Sahl 'Isa ibn Yahya al-Masihi al-Jurjani (Persian: ابو سهل عيسى‌ بن‌ يحيى مسيحی گرگانی) was a Christian Persian polymath, physician, and philosopher from ancient Gorgan (Persian: گرگان, Arabic: جرجان), (Note: This refers to the historical region and city of Gorgan (Jurjān), located near present-day Gonbad-e Kavus in northern Iran, and should not be confused with the modern city of Gorgan.) who was also active in fields such as astronomy and mathematics.

He wrote an encyclopedic treatise on medicine of one hundred chapters (al-mā'a fi-l-sanā'a al-tabi'iyyah; Arabic: المائة في الصناعة الطبيعية,Persian: صدباب ابوسهل), which is one of the earliest Arabic works of its kind and may have been in some respects the model of Avicenna's Qanun.

He wrote other treatises on measles, on the plague, on the pulse, and other subjects.

== Relationship with Avicenna ==
A number of medieval historians, many of whom were themselves physicians, as well as several modern scholars, have described Abū Sahl al-Masīḥī as a teacher of Avicenna, or have at least alluded to this widely held view. Avicenna himself, however, in his autobiographical account of his medical studies, does not mention learning medicine from any teacher, stating instead that he mastered the discipline independently within a short period of time.

== The final years of life and death ==
According to a well-known anecdote reported by Niẓāmī ʿArūḍī (Persian: نظامی عروضی) in his Chahār Maqāla (Persian: چهار مقاله), Abū Sahl al-Masīḥī, together with Abū Naṣr Manṣūr ibn ʿIrāq, al-Bīrūnī, Avicenna, and Ibn al-Khammār, were gathered at the court of the Khwarazmshah Maʾmūn ibn Maʾmūn in [Old] Gurganj (Persian: گرگانج / اورگنج, Arabic: جرجانیه; present-day Köneürgenç in Turkmenistan, not to be confused with the modern city of Urgench / Gurganj in present-day Uzbekistan). According to Niẓāmī, Sultan Maḥmūd of Ghazni sent an envoy to Maʾmūn requesting that these scholars be dispatched to his court. Maʾmūn conveyed the request to them, stating that he was unable to resist Maḥmūd’s demand and that anyone unwilling to go to Ghazni should leave Gurganj without delay.

According to this account, Abū Sahl al-Masīḥī and Avicenna refused to enter Maḥmūd’s service and set out across the Khwarazm desert (Karakum Desert). Avicenna reportedly predicted, on astrological grounds, that they would lose their way, while Abū Sahl foretold that he would not survive the journey. The two men eventually became lost in the desert; Abū Sahl died of thirst, whereas Avicenna, after considerable hardship, reached Abivard and later proceeded to Gurgan.

Modern scholarship generally treats this anecdote with caution. While some elements of the account appear to be supported by independent evidence—such as the documented presence of several of these scholars, including Abū Sahl al-Masīḥī, at the court of Maʾmūn ibn Maʾmūn, as reflected in works dedicated to the Khwarazmshah and his vizier— the narrative as a whole cannot be accepted uncritically. In particular, the circumstances surrounding Abū Sahl’s death remain uncertain. According to Ibn Abī Uṣaybiʿa, Avicenna composed a short treatise entitled An epistle to Abū Sahl al-Masīḥī on angles (R. ilā Abī Sahl al-Masīḥī fī l-zāwiyah, Arabic: رسالة الی ابی‌سهل المسیحي في الزاویة) after his departure from Gurgan ("Composed at Jurjān",), which may suggest that Abū Sahl was still alive at that time, or at least calls for caution in accepting the anecdotal chronology in full.

== Sources ==
- Carl Brockelmann: Arabische Litteratur (vol. 1, 138, 1898).
- G. Karmi, A mediaeval compendium of Arabic medicine: Abu Sahl al-Masihi's "Book of the Hundred.", J. Hist. Arabic Sci. vol. 2(2) 270-90 (1978).

== See also ==
- List of Iranian scientists
