= Abu 'Abdallah Muhammad =

Ruler of Afrighid dynasty of Khwarezm

Abu 'Abdallah Muhammad (died 995) was the last ruler of the Afrighid dynasty of Khwarezm from 967 to 995. He was the son and successor of Abu Sa'id Ahmad.

During the chaos that occurred among the Samanids, Khwarazm was not affected by it. However, in 992, Abu 'Abdallah aided the Samanid ruler Nuh II against the Turkic Kara-Khanid Khanate, and was granted several towns in northern Khurasan, which included the important town of Abiward. Abu 'Ali Simjuri, the governor of Khurasan, however, refused to grant the latter the cities.

In 995, Ma'mun I ibn Muhammad, the Ma'munid ruler of Gurganj, invaded the domains of Abu 'Abdallah and executed him, putting an end to Afrighid rule, and uniting the Khwarazm province under his rule.

| Preceded by Abu Sa'id Ahmad | Ruler of Khwarazm; 967–995 | Succeeded by Ma'mun I ibn Muhammad |
