= Abu'l-Harith Muhammad =

Ma'munid ruler of Khwarazm in 1017

Abu'l-Harith Muhammad was ruler of Khwarazm for a period in 1017. The son of Abu al-Hasan Ali, he was the last member of the Iranian Ma'munid dynasty to rule Khwarazm.

In 1017, a young Muhammad was declared shah by the murderers of his uncle Abu'l Abbas Ma'mun. Mahmud of Ghazna, who had been Ma'mun's brother-in-law, was afforded a pretext for invading and a force was assembled in northern Khurasan. The Khwarazamis were unable to provide any effective resistance, and Muhammad was captured and imprisoned; Khwarazm therefore became a part of the Ghaznavid Empire. After taking vengeance on the Ma'mun's murderers Mahmud installed a Turk, the hajib Altun Tash, as governor of the province.

== Sources ==
- Bosworth, C. Edmund (1984). "ĀL-E MAʾMŪN". Archived copy. Encyclopaedia Iranica, Vol. I, Fasc. 7. C. Edmund Bosworth. pp. 762–764. Archived from the original on 2012-09-27.
