= Ma'mun II =

Ma'munid ruler of Khwarazm (AD 11th century)

Abu'l-Abbas Ma'mun ibn Ma'mun (died March 1017) was the Ma'munid ruler of Khwarazm from 1009 until his death in 1017, having succeeded his Abu al-Hasan Ali in that post. He was the son of Ma'mun I ibn Muhammad.

The greatest threat to Ma'mun's rule came in the form of the Ghaznavid sultan, Mahmud of Ghazni. Mahmud viewed Khwarazm as a strategically important province, as it would allow him to widen the front against his biggest enemy, the Karakhanids of Transoxiana. When the caliph al-Qadir sent Ma'mun several awards, including an investiture patent for Khwarazm (confirming him as independent ruler) in 1014, Ma'mun refused to accept the awards in his capital, fearing that personally accepting the symbols of independence would anger Mahmud. He instead sent out a delegation to accept the awards on the steppe. Ma'mun also married Mahmud's sister Hurra-yi Khuttali, who had previously been married to his brother, in 1015 or 1016.

Despite these efforts to placate Mahmud, the Ghaznavid demanded that Ma'mun put his name in the khutba, in effect acknowledging his suzerainty. Although the nobility and the army were opposed to such measure, Ma'mun had no choice but to give in. He agreed to place Mahmud's name in the khutba and to fulfil other humiliating demands. In response the army revolted and Ma'mun was killed. The rebels placed his nephew Muhammad on the throne, but Mahmud used the death of his brother-in-law as a pretext for annexing Khwarazm.

During Ma'mun's reign several scholars, such as al-Biruni, resided in Khwarazm, and in fact one of Mahmud's demands upon the shah was that several of them be sent to him. Ma'mun also was responsible for several building projects; he ordered a minaret to be constructed in Gurganj in 1011.

== See also ==
- Ghaznavid conquest of Khwarazm

== Sources ==
- Bosworth, C. Edmund (1984). "ĀL-E MAʾMŪN". Encyclopaedia Iranica, Vol. I, Fasc. 7. C. Edmund Bosworth. pp. 762–764.

Preceded by Abu al-Hasan Ali	Ma'munid ruler of Khwarazm; 1009–1017	Succeeded by Abu'l-Harith Muhammad
