= Ma'mun I ibn Muhammad =

Ma'mun ibn Muhammad

Ruler of Khwarazm
- In office 995-997
- Preceded by: Abu ‘Abdallah Muhammad
- Succeeded by: Abu al-Hasan Ali

Personal details
- Died: 997
- Children: Abu al-Abbas Ma'mun Abu al-Hasan Ali

Abu'l-Ali Ma'mun ibn Muhammad (died 997) was ruler of Khwarazm from 995 until his death in 997. He was the founder of the Ma'munid dynasty, which lasted from 995 until 1017.

Ma'mun was originally the Samanid governor of southern Khwarazm, with his capital at Gurganj. In 995 he invaded northern Khwarazm and deposed the last Afrigid Shah Abu 'Abdallah Muhammad (who was also a Samanid vassal), therefore uniting the province under his rule he would be the namesake for the Ma'munids who would stay in power for 3 decades. Upon his death in 997, his son Abu al-Hasan Ali succeeded him.

Preceded by Abu 'Abdallah Muhammad	Ruler of Khwarazm; 995–997	Succeeded by Abu al-Hasan Ali
