= Ismail Khandan =

Ruler of Khwarazm from 1035 to 1041

Isma'il Khandan

Khwarazm
- Reign: 1035–1041
- Predecessor: Harun
- Successor: Shah Malik
- Father: Altun Tash

Isma'il Khandan was the ruler of Khwarazm, an ancient state along the previous Aral Sea, from 1035 to 1041 AD. He was the son of Altun Tash.

In 1035 Isma'il's brother Harun was assassinated by his guards at the instigation of the Ghaznavid sultan Mas'ud I of Ghazni. Isma'il took control of Khwarazm, and like his brother defied Mas'ud and gave support to the Seljuks, who were also hostile to Mas'ud. In response Mas'ud turned to the Oghuz Yabghu (chieftain), Shah Malik, for support, inviting him to take over the governorship of Khwarazm. In the winter of 1040/1041 Isma'il was defeated by Shah Malik and forced to flee to the Seljuks.

Preceded by Harun	Governor of Khwarazm; 1035–1041	Succeeded by Shah Malik
