= Altuntash (khwarazmshah) =

Khwarazmshah from 1017 to 1032

- Shah

Khwarazmshah
- Reign: 1017–1032
- Predecessor: Muhammad
- Successor: Harun
- Died: 1032
- Religion: Islam

Altuntash (died 1032) was a Turkic khwarazmshah from 1017 until his death in 1032.

Altuntash was originally a slave commander serving the Ghaznavid Sebüktegin. In 1008 he played a leading role in a battle against the Karakhanids at Sharkhiyan near Balkh, in which the Ghaznavids were victorious. By 1011 he had been made governor of Herat by Sabuktigin's son, Mahmud of Ghazni.

In 1017 Mahmud conquered Khwarazm from its Ma'munid rulers, and made Altuntash its governor. Altuntash's tenure as Khwarazmshah consisted of preventing the Oghuz and Qarluqs from making raids into the region. He also participated in Mahmud's 1025 campaign against the Karakhanid ruler of Transoxiana, 'Ali-tigin, in which Samarkand was temporarily occupied, and was present at the meeting between Mahmud and his ally, the Karakhanid ruler of Kashgar, Qadir-khan Yusuf.

In 1032 Mahmud's successor, Mas'ud struck a new alliance with Qadir-khan Yusuf against 'Ali-tigin, who had recovered his realm shortly after the Ghaznavids had left Transoxiana. Mas'ud ordered Altuntash to undertake a campaign against 'Ali-tigin, and he dutifully responded, invading Transoxiana. He met up with the Karakhanid army near Bukhara and engaged them in battle, but was mortally wounded. His lieutenant Ahmad Shirazi was able to conclude a peace with 'Ali-tigin, and shortly afterwards Altuntash died.

Altuntash never wavered in his loyalty to the Ghaznavids and in 1032 led an army at the battle of Dabusiyya against the Kara-Khanid ruler, Ali Tigin Bughra Khan. Though he was able to extricate his army from the indecisive battle, Altun died of wounds received in the conflict. He had two sons, Harun and Ismail Khandan. Harun was not made Khwarazmshah following his death, although he was effectively ruler of Khwarazm.

== Bibliography ==
- Bosworth, Clifford Edmund (1968). "The Political and Dynastic History of the Iranian World (A.D. 1000–1217)". In Boyle, John Andrew (ed.). The Cambridge History of Iran: The Saljuq and Mongol Periods. Vol. 5. Cambridge: Cambridge University Press. pp. 1–202. ISBN 0-521-06936-X.
- Bosworth, Clifford Edmund (1978). "K̲h̲wārazm-S̲h̲āhs". In van Donzel, E.; Lewis, B.; Pellat, Ch. & Bosworth, C. E. (eds.). The Encyclopaedia of Islam, Second Edition. Volume IV: Iran–Kha. Leiden: E. J. Brill. ISBN 978-90-04-05745-6. OCLC 758278456.
- Bosworth, Clifford Edmund (1984). "Āl-e Maʾmūn". Encyclopaedia Iranica, Vol. I, Fasc. 7. pp. 762–764.
- Bosworth, Clifford Edmund (1989). "Altuntaš". In Yarshater, Ehsan (ed.). Encyclopædia Iranica. Vol. III: Ātaš–Bayhaqī, Ẓahīr-al-Dīn. London and New York: Routledge & Kegan Paul. p. 915. ISBN 978-0-71009-121-5.

Preceded by Muhammad	Khwarazmshah; 1017–1032	Succeeded by Harun
