= Abu al-Hasan Ali =

Ma'munid ruler of Khwarazm (AD 10th-11th centuries)

Abu al-Hasan 'Ali'
- Shah
- Reign: 997 - 1009
- Predecessor: Mamun I
- Successor: Mamun II
- Died: 1009
- Dynasty: Ma'munid dynasty
- Father: Ma'mun I ibn Muhammad

Abu al-Hasan 'Ali (died c. 1009) was ruler of Khwarazm (a large oasis region on the Amu Darya river delta in western Central Asia) from 997 until his death c. 1009. The second member of the Ma'munid dynasty, he was the son of Ma'mun I ibn Muhammad.

In 997, Ali took over Khwarazm following his father's death. Little is known of his reign, but his emirate was dependent upon the Karakhanids, rivals of the Ghaznavids. He died around 1009 and was succeeded by his brother, Abu al-Abbas Ma'mun.

== Sources ==
- Bosworth, C. Edmund (1985). "ʿALĪ B. MAʾMŪN". Encyclopaedia Iranica, Vol. I, Fasc. 8. C. Edmund Bosworth. p. 852.

Preceded by Ma'mun I	Ma'munid ruler of Khwarazm; 997–1009	Succeeded by Ma'mun II
