= Konye-Urgench =

City in north Turkmenistan

Konye-Urgench Köneürgenç şäheri
- City
- Köneürgenç
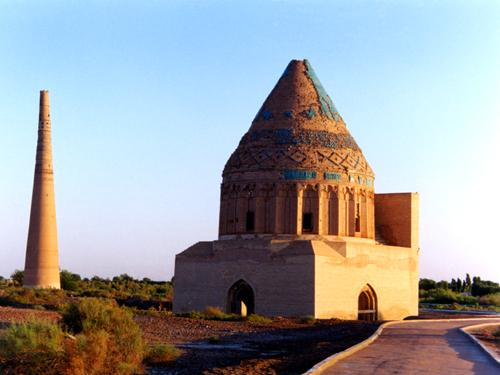
- Part of the ancient city of Konye-Urgench. On the left: Gutlug Timur Minaret; On the right: Sultan Tekesh Mausoleum

- Location in Turkmenistan
- Coordinates: 42°19′32″N 59°09′07″E
- Country: Turkmenistan
- Province: Daşoguz Province
- District: Köneürgenç District

Population (2022 official census)
  - Total: 37,176
- Time zone: UTC+5

Konye-Urgench (Persian: کهنه گرگانج, romanized: Kuhna Gurgānj, lit. 'Old Gurgānj'), also known as Köneürgenç, Old Urgench or Urganj, is a city in north Turkmenistan, just south from its border with Uzbekistan. In 2022, it had a total population of 37,176 people.

It is the site of the ancient town of Gurgānj, which contains the ruins of the capital of Khwarazm. The inhabitants of the ancient city deserted it in the early eighteenth century in order to develop a new settlement, and Konye-Urgench has remained undisturbed ever since. In 2005, the ruins of Old Urgench were inscribed on the UNESCO List of World Heritage Sites.

== Overview ==
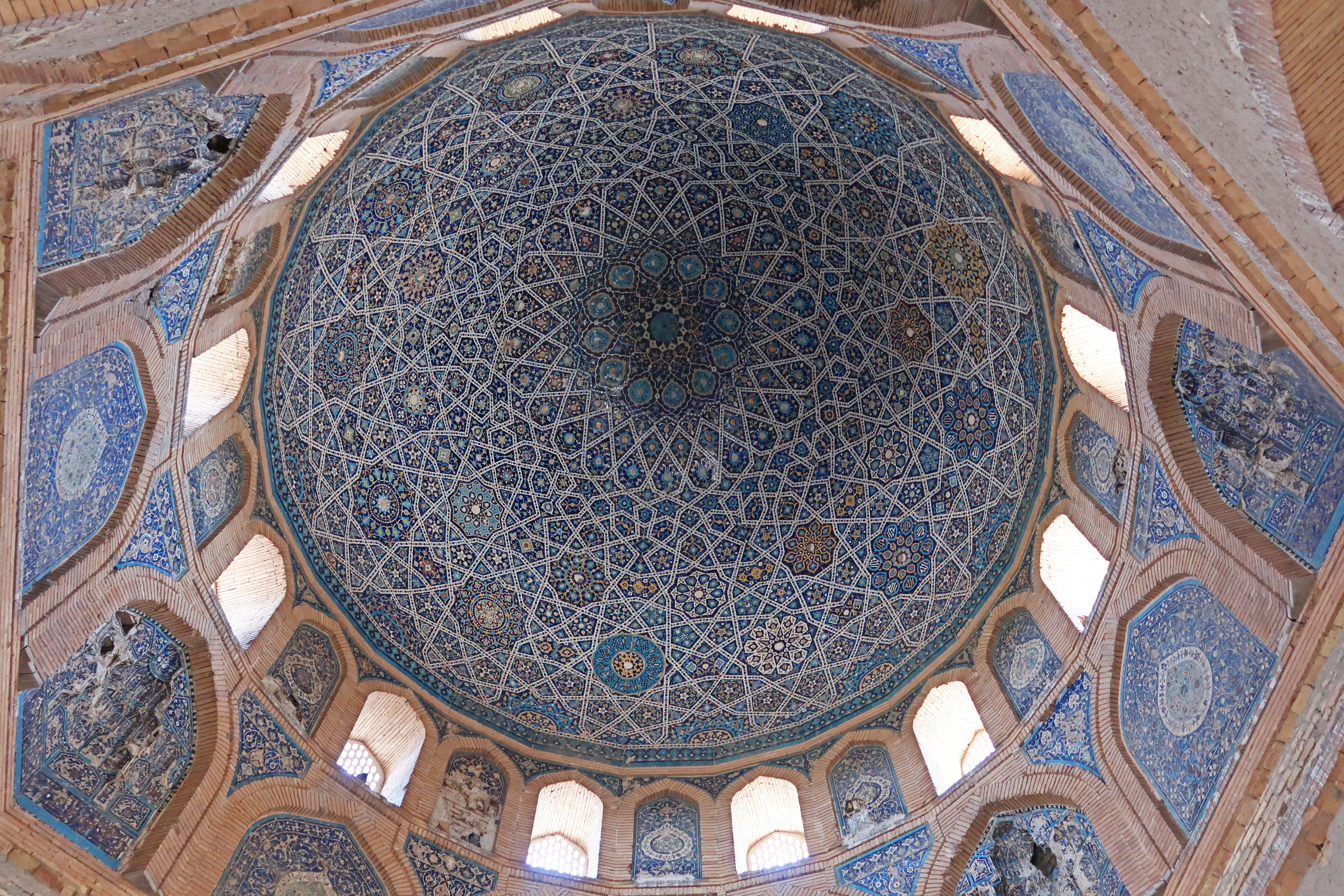
Highly intricate decoration of Turabek Khanum Mausoleum dome. All tiling is original surviving more than 6 centuries.

Located on the south side of the Amu Darya River, Old Urgench was situated on one of the most important medieval paths: the Silk Road, the crossroad of western and eastern civilisations. It is one of the most important archaeological sites in Turkmenistan, situated within a vast protected landscape zone and featuring a large number of well-preserved monuments dating from the 11th to the 16th centuries. They comprise mosques, the gates of a caravanserai, fortresses, mausoleums and a minaret, and the influence of their architectural style and craftsmanship reached Iran, Afghanistan and the later architecture of the Mughal Empire of 16th-century India.

== Etymology ==
Atanyyazow explains, "In the works of Chinese historians, the name Yue-Gyan, which occurs in Georgian forms in the works of Arab scholars of the 10th century,...was used in the form of Gurganj, a native of Khorezm....and -j, according to Yakut, mean[s] just like the word... abat, i.e., "village" and "city"...Given the ancient name of the word Gurgen..., then the toponym of Gurganj...has the meaning of "Gurgen city", "Gurgen city of the people". Later, the name Gurganj began to be used in the form of Urgench." To what Gurgen or Gurgan refer, however, remains unexplained.

== History and development ==
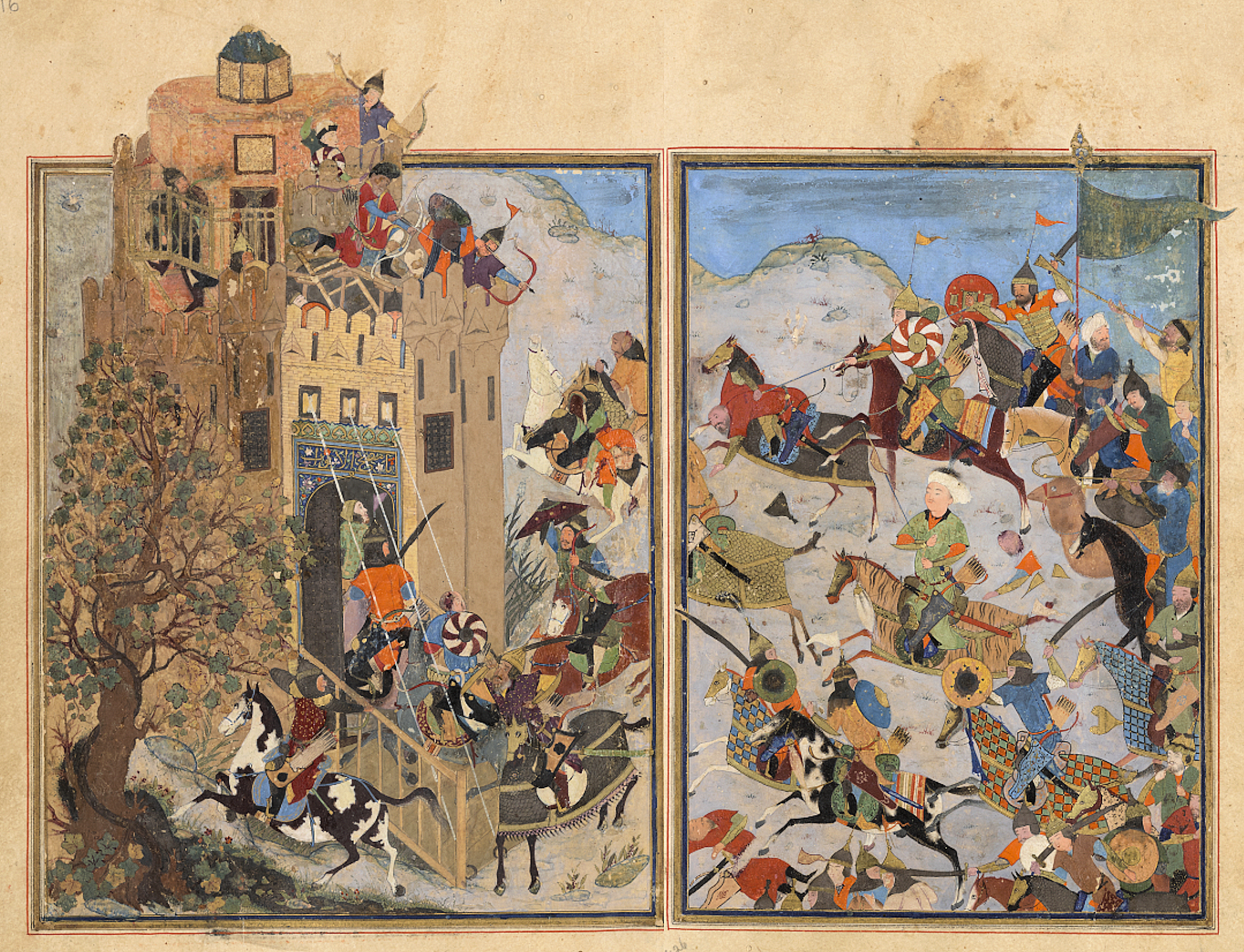
Timur's army, commanded by his son Umar Shaykh, in the Siege of Urgench (1379). Garrett Zafarnama (1480).

The exact dates when Konye-Urgench was founded remain uncertain, but archaeological finds at the Kyrkmolla Hill (one of the main fortresses at the site) reveal that the town already had a strong structure in the 5th and 4th centuries BC. Some of the earliest records show that Khwarezm was conquered by the Arabs in 712, who took the capital city of Kath of the Iranic Khwarazmian Afrighid dynasty. The city rose to prominence between the 10th and 14th centuries as the Khwarezmian capital, replacing Kath. Gurjanu served as an important trading center, competing in fame and population with many other Central Asian cities, such as Bukhara. It had become highly prosperous due to its strategic location on the main trade routes from the south to the north, and the west to the east, vastly contributing to the development of science and culture in Central Asia.

According to an 1893 writer, Djordjania or Jorjania was the "second capital" of the country. It was on the Wadak canal which seems to be the east end of the Kunya-Darya which seems to be the river bed that now leads to the Sarykamysh Lake. Just east of the town was the Gurganj Dam that irrigated the area and blocked the flow of the Oxus into the Caspian Sea. In 1221 both town and dam were destroyed by the Mongols and the surrounding area became a marsh. Konye-Urgench was soon built on or near the site of Jorjania.

In 1221, Genghis Khan destroyed the city in the Mongol invasion of Central Asia, in what is considered to be one of the bloodiest massacres in human history. Most if not all the ancient Iranic Khwarazmian people were killed or pushed out, paving the way for the Turkification of Khwarazm. Despite the devastating effects of the invasion, the city was revived and it regained its previous status. It was described by the 14th-century Berber traveller Ibn Battuta as "the largest, greatest, most beautiful and most important city of the Turks. It has fine bazaars and broad streets, a great number of buildings and abundance of commodities".

In 1373, Timur attacked Khwarezm, and its ruler Yusef Sufi of the Sufi Dynasty surrendered to Timur. In 1379, Yusef Sufi rebelled against Timur, who sacked Urgench, and Yusef Sufi was killed. In 1388, the Sufi dynasty of Urgench again revolted against Timur; this time Timur razed Urgench to the ground and massacred its population, destroyed the city's irrigation system, and had barley planted over the ground where the city had once stood, leaving only one mosque standing. This, coupled with the sudden change of the Amu-Darya River's course, constituted the beginning of Konye-Urgench's decline until the 16th century, when it was replaced as a regional capital by Khiva and was ultimately abandoned.

The area was later inhabited by the Turkmen people from the early 19th century, but they mostly developed outside the old town, utilising the latter as a graveyard. However, this use has now stopped, and efforts have been made to remove the decaying grave stones that can be encountered at the site.

The new town of Urgench was developed to the southeast, in present-day Uzbekistan. Some of the first archeological research on the old city site was conducted by Alexander Yakubovsky in 1929.

Konye-Urgench
- Köneürgenç کؤنه‌‌اۆرگنچ
- Kunya-Urgench; Old Urgench; Urganj
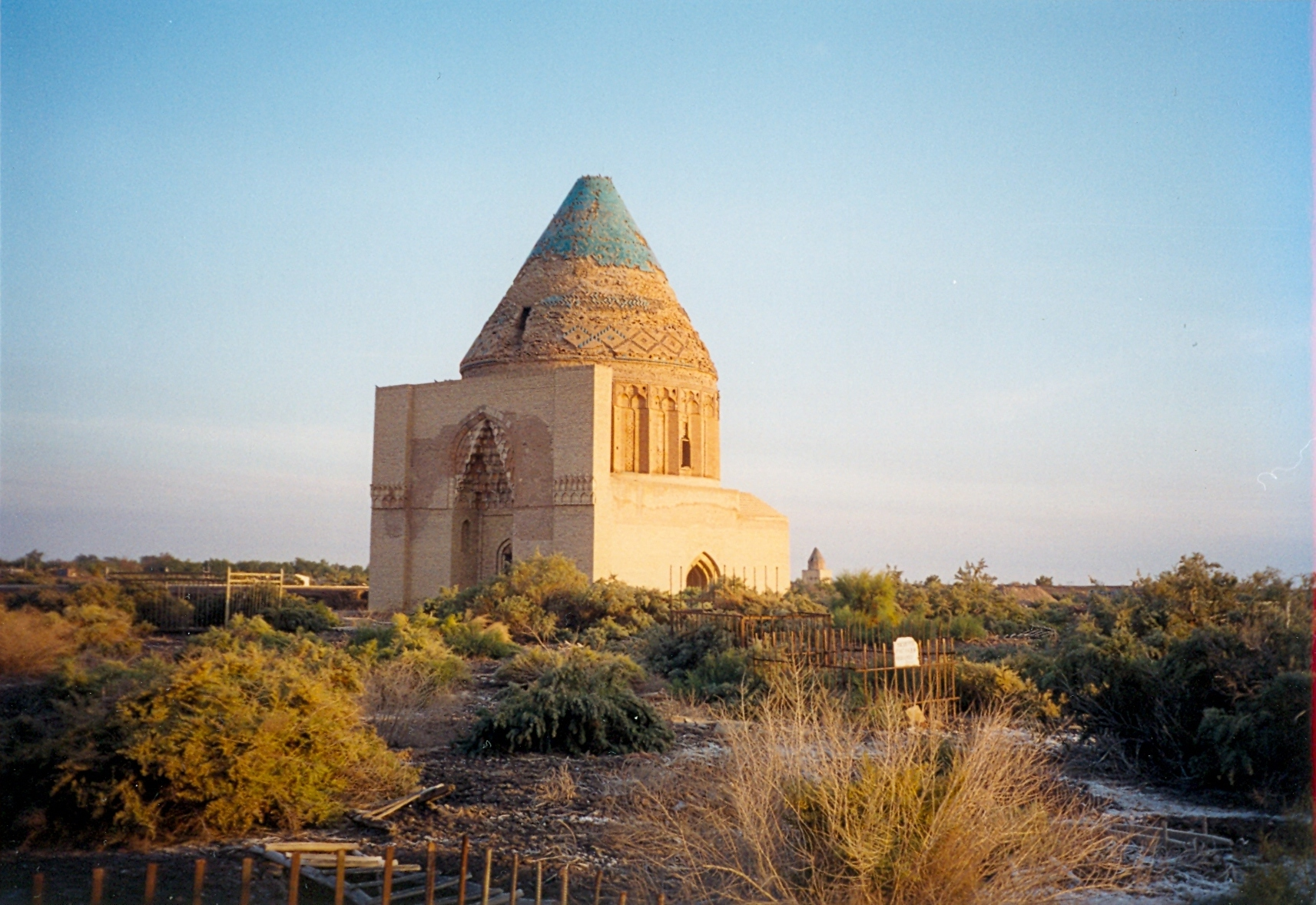
- Soltan Tekesh Mausoleum in Konye-Urgench
- Interactive map of Konye-Urgench
- Type: Settlement
- Periods: Khwarazmian dynasty
- Cultures: Khwarezm
- Location: Daşoguz Province, Turkmenistan

Site notes
- Condition: Ruined

UNESCO World Heritage Site
- Official name: Kunya-Urgench
- Type: Cultural
- Criteria: ii, iii
- Designated: 2005 (29th session)
- Reference no.: 1199
- Region: Asia and Australasia

== Archaeological remains ==
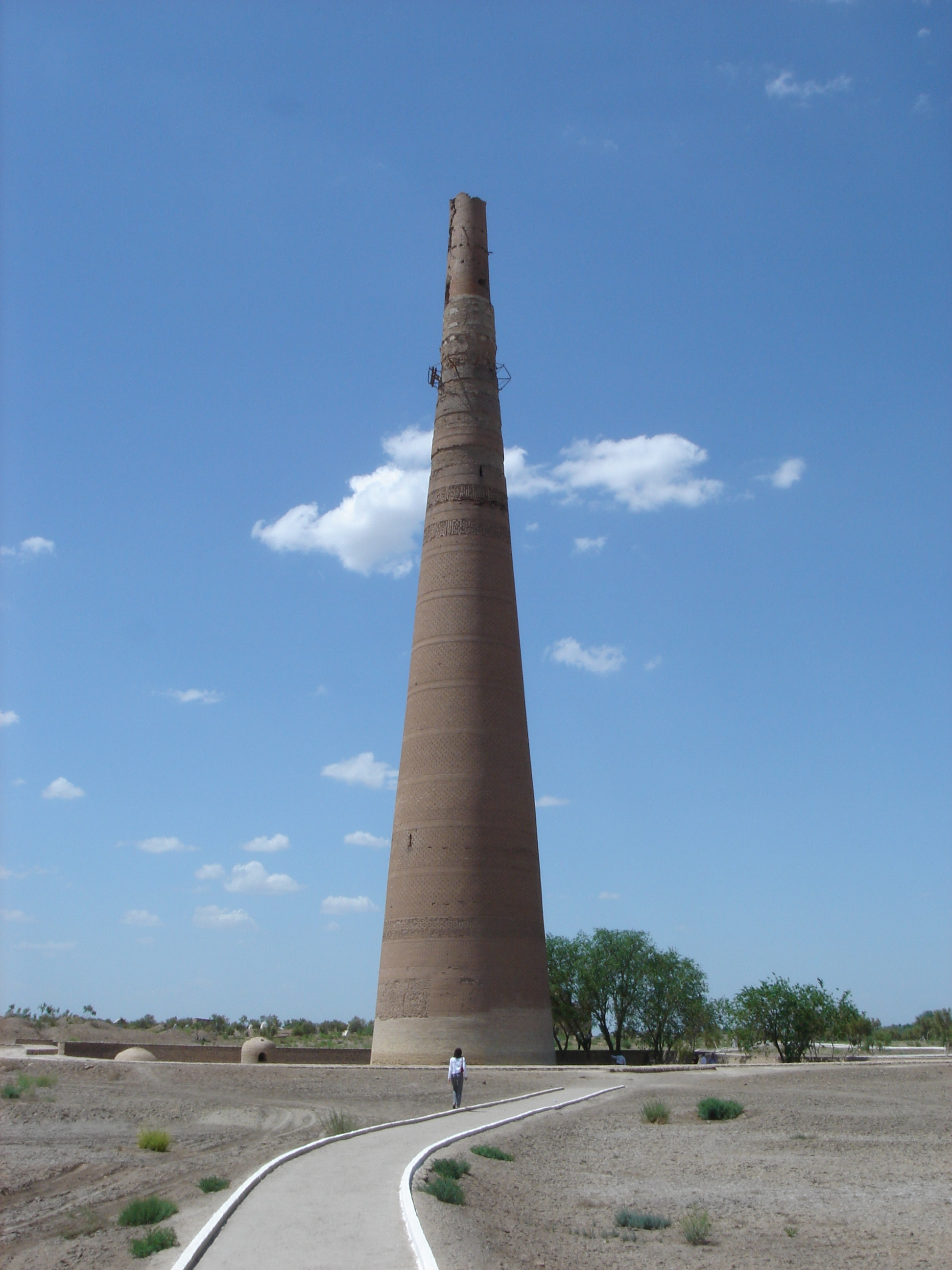
Kutlug Timur Minaret

The urban layout of Konye-Urgench has been lost and only certain monuments remain standing to this day. These are authentic and rich examples of fine architecture and building traditions existing for centuries. The level of conservation varies amongst the buildings, and the most substantial restoration work has been carried out in the past thirty years, during the soviet era, using traditional methods and materials.

=== Kutlug-Timur Minaret ===
The Kutlug Timur minaret dates to the 11th and 12th centuries, and measures 60 meters in height, making it the highest monument in the park. Its diameter is 12 meters at its base, and 2 at the top.

On the basis of its decorative brickwork, including Kufic inscriptions, the minaret is thought to be an earlier construction, only restored by Kutlug-Timur around 1330.

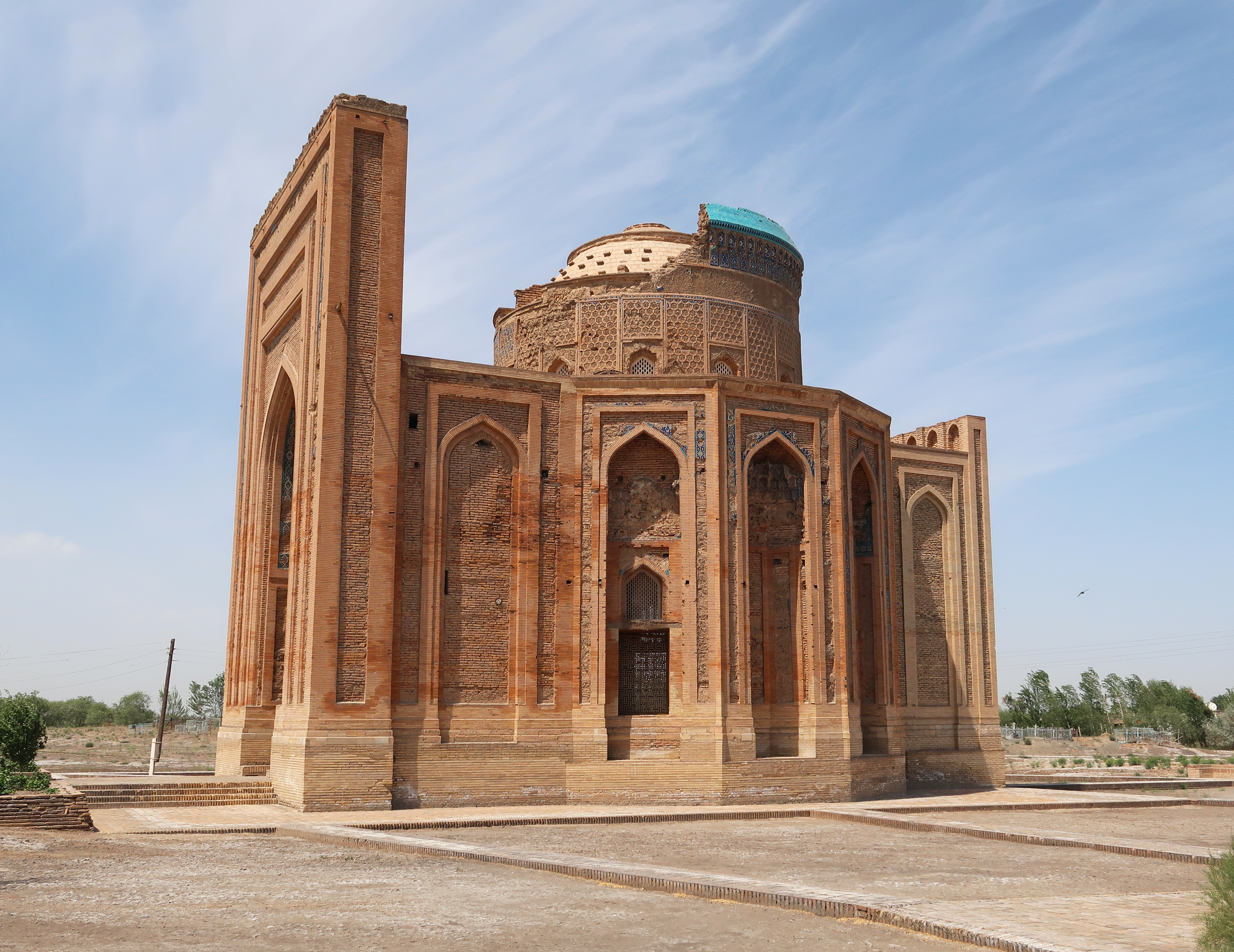
Turabek Khanum Mausoleum, view from the south

=== Turabek-Khanum Mausoleum ===
The largest surviving monument in Konye-Urgench. Named after Turabek-Khanum, the wife of Kutlug-Timur (ruled between 1321 and 1336 on behalf of the Golden Horde), this structure is located at the northern part of ancient Gurgench. It is remarkable for its elegant design and tile decoration, and it is a highly sophisticated work of architecture, both in its conceptualisation of spaces and in its engineering.

The original building was composed of two chambers: a large domed hall and a smaller one behind it. The large chamber is twelve-sided on the exterior and hexagonal on the interior, being preceded by an entrance portal and a vestibule. The outer dome was likely conical, like other domes of Konye-Urgench.

The most impressive architectural feature of the mausoleum is the interior of the circular dome covering the main hall, whose surface survives almost entirely intact, despite the collapse of the outer dome long ago. It is covered in colourful mosaic which form intricate ornamental patterns consisting of flowers and stars, creating a visual metaphor for the heavens. The design echoes the 14th century dome of the Jameh Mosque of Yazd, but exhibiting greater refinement. It is arguably the period's artistic peak. The dome sits on a 24 sided ring, consisting of alternating mosaic and window panels; this further sits on a 12 sided ring which form the transition from the dome to the hexagonal floor plan, using muqarnas vaulting at the corners of the hexagon.

The recurring use of the number 12 may refer to the 12 Shia Imams, though since the rulers of the city were generally opposed Shi'ism, so it could instead refer to the numerical patterns represent the twelve months of the year or the signs of the zodiac.

No comparable contemporary parallels can be found at Urgench, as some of the architectural features, such as the decorations mentioned above, do not appear in other monuments built during the lifetime of Turabek-Khanum, around 1330. Thus, it is difficult to date the building so early. These features do, however, appear in Central Asia later, during the reign of Timur, the Turco-Mongol founder of the Timurid Empire. New technologies, such as mosaic faience, show up in Timur's earliest buildings, such as the Aq Saray palace in Shahrisabz, in Uzbekistan, which was begun in 1379 but was still unfinished in 1404.

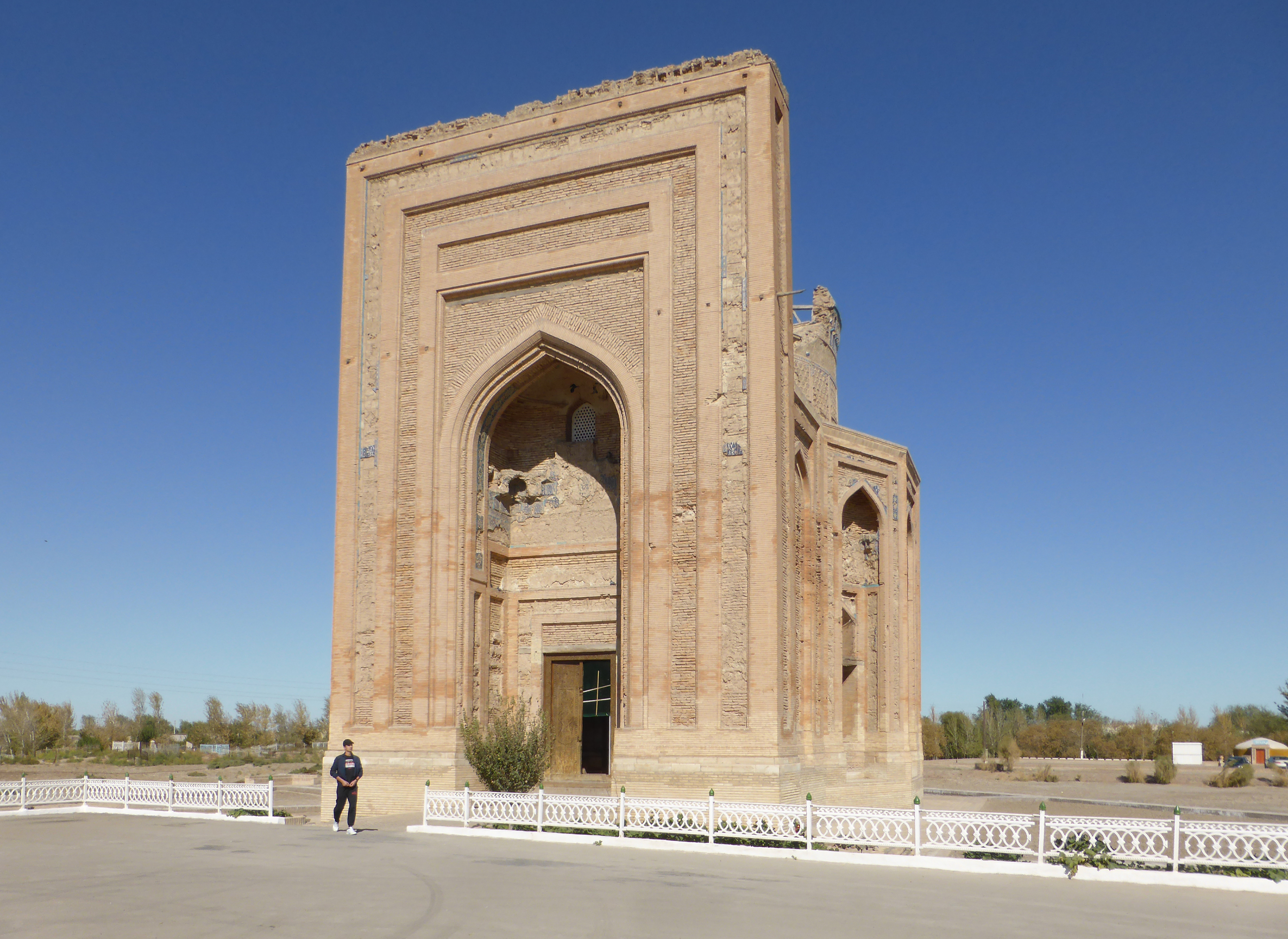
Front Iwan of Turabek Khanum Mausoleum

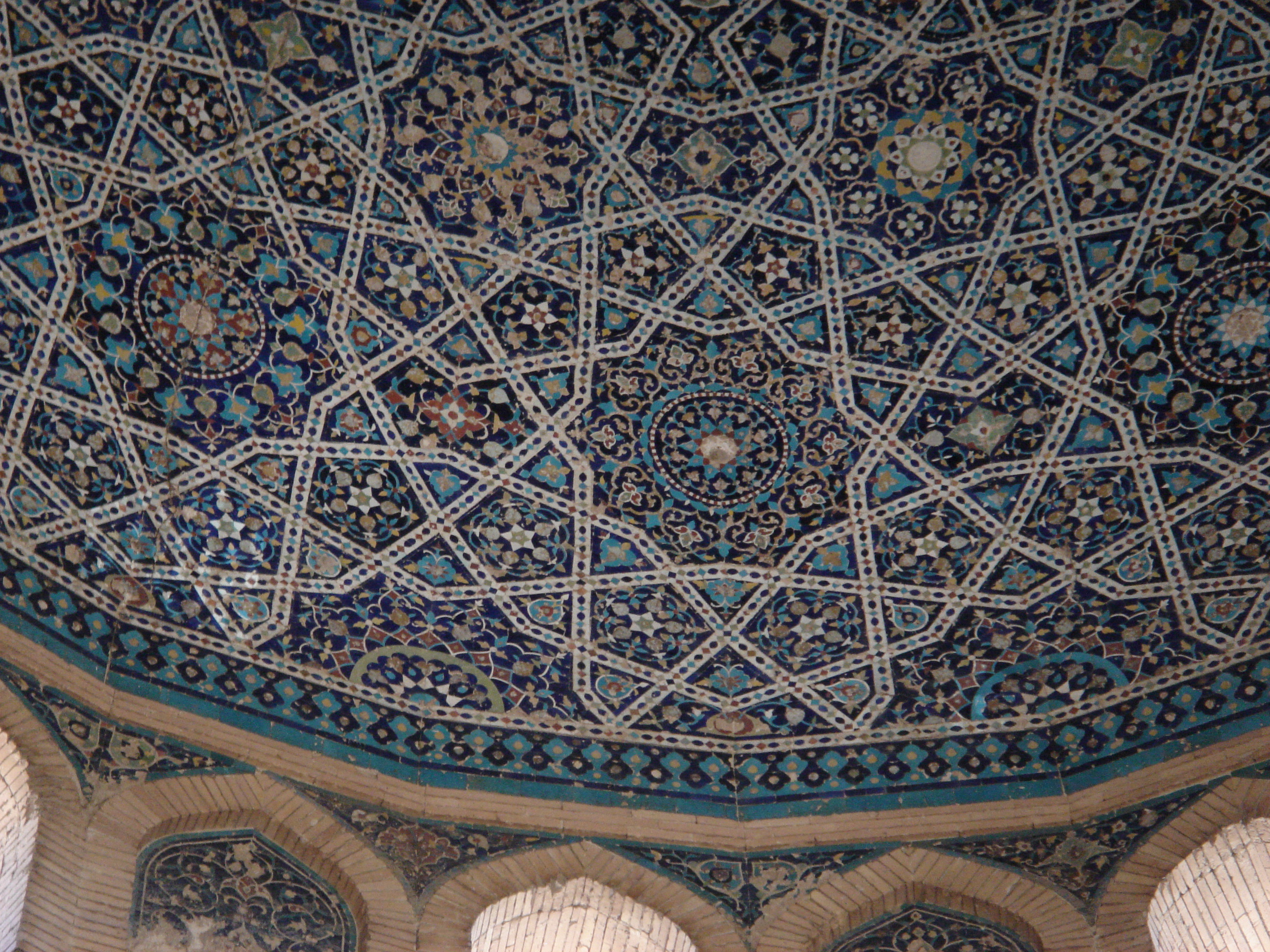
Mosaic decoration on the dome of Turabek Khanum Mausoleum

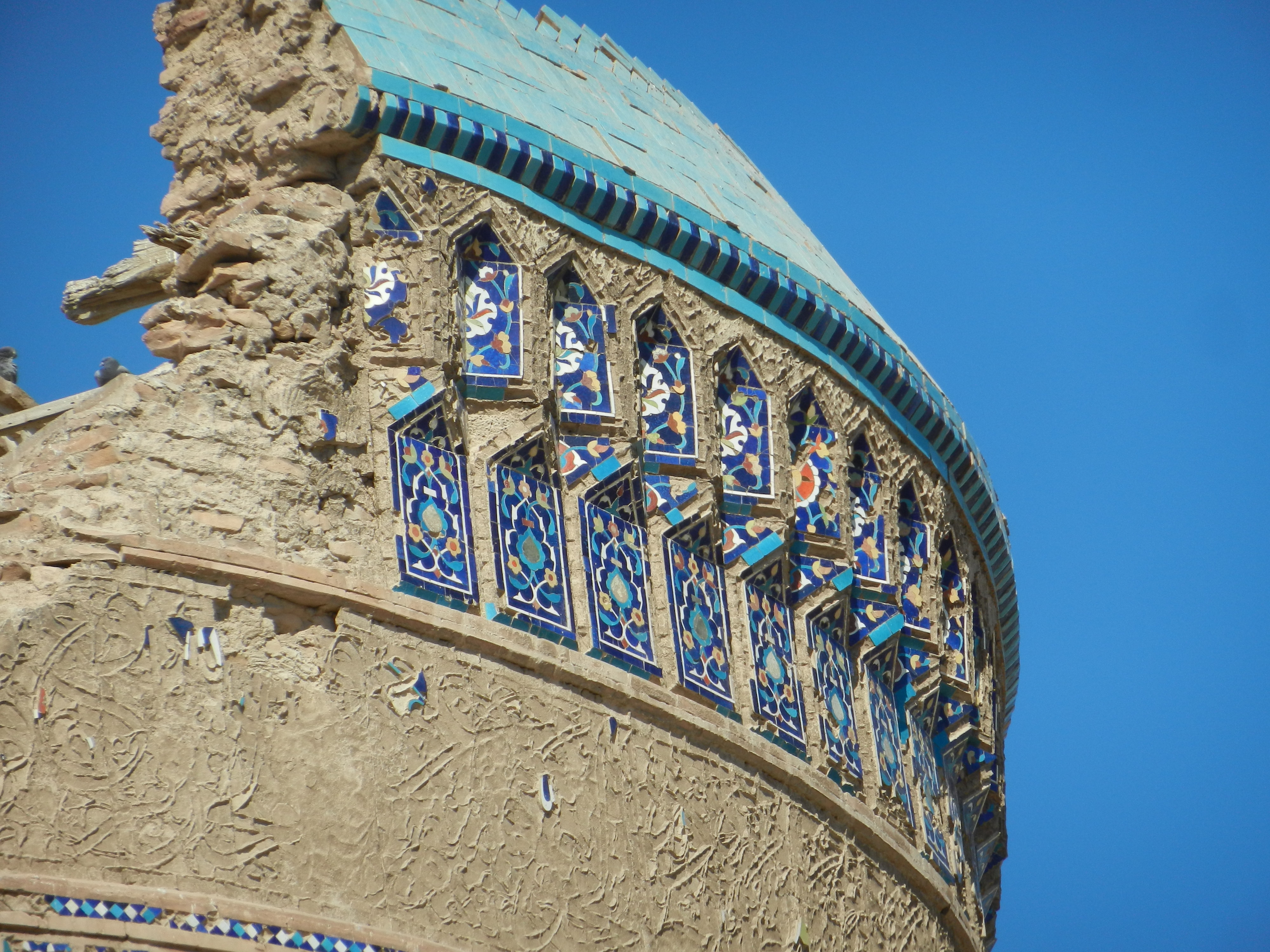
Muqarnas and decoration on outer dome

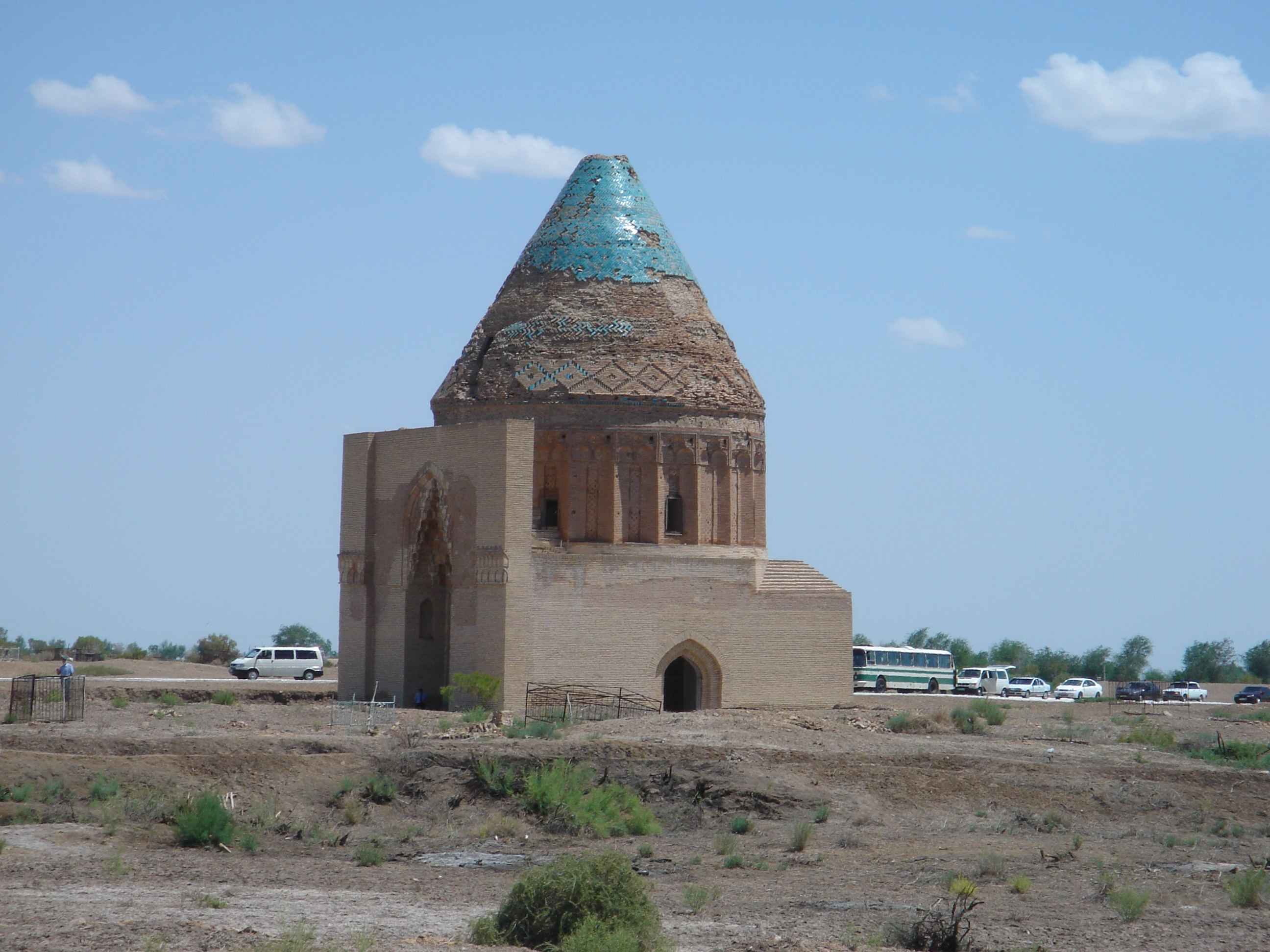
Tekesh Mausoleum, Konye-Urgench, Turkmenistan

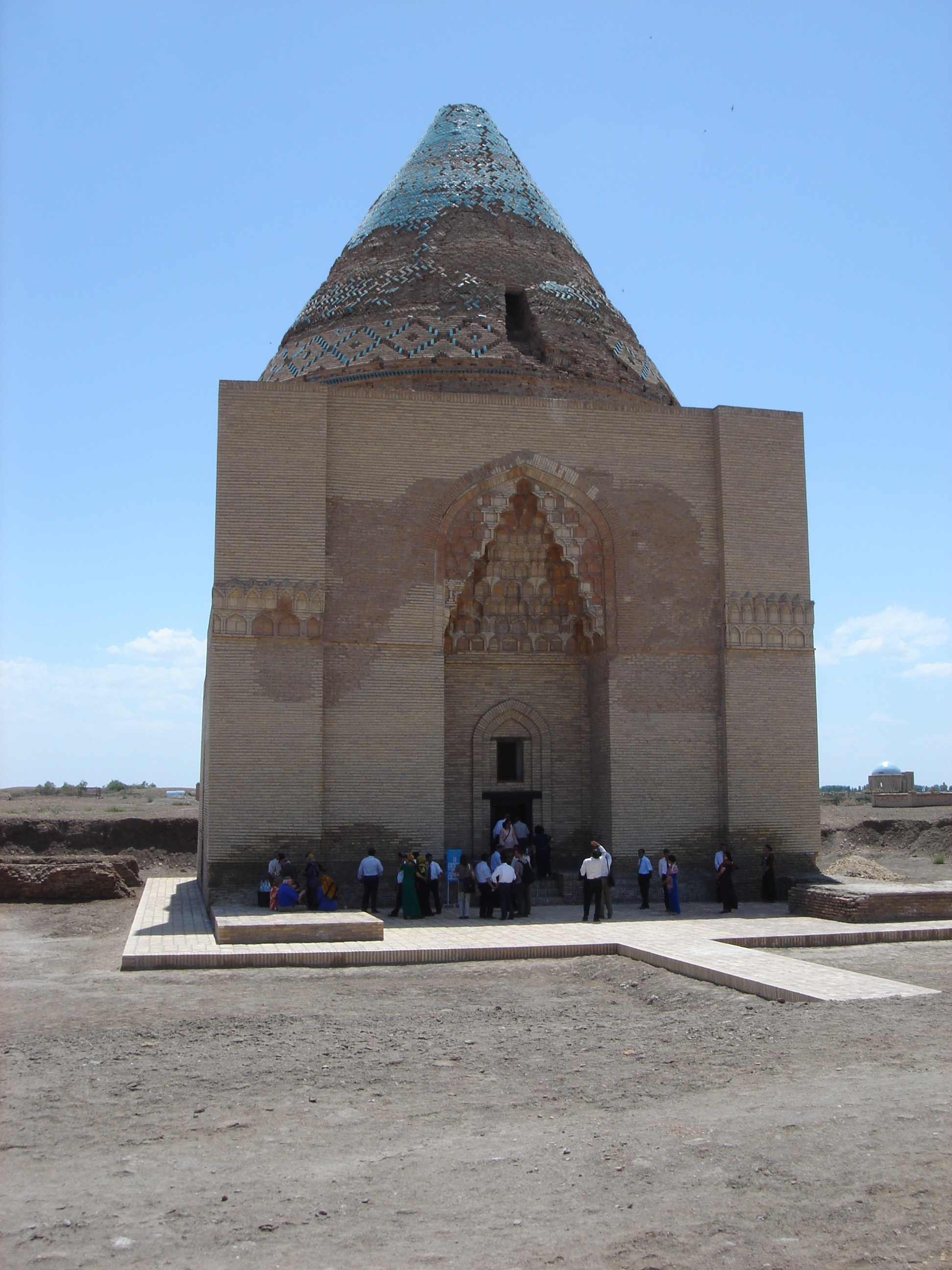
View of Tekesh Mausoleum

=== Tekesh Mausoleum ===
This structure is the presumed Tomb of Sultan Ala al-Din Tekish, the founder of the Khwarazmian Empire and its ruler between 1172-1200. It has been identified as a mausoleum due to the tradition that each ancient Central Asian building is dedicated to a historical or mythical personage.

The building is made of bricks and consists of a square hall with walls which are 11,45 meters high, a massive round drum and a conical roof with an inner dome hidden under it. The dome is connected to the square walls it rests upon by an octagonal belt. The structure between the dome and the octagon is decorated with 16 shallow niches. Their form is not lancet-like as those commonly found in the Islamic architecture of Central Asia, but rather semicircular. This is a motif that can be found in the marble 8th-century mihrab at the Baghdad Museum, and has seldom been used in Central Asia: another comparable case that can be found in Turkmenistan is that of the mihrab of Muhammad Ibn Zayd's 11th-century mosque, from Merv. However, the two are located too far away to be considered prototypes.

The external conical roof is built of horizontal layers using the technique of a false vault. From the inside, it is strengthened with 12 buttresses standing upon the internal dome. Although this might seem like a risky construction technique, the roof is not in bad condition: only the top is destroyed, and the blue majolica decoration slightly damaged.

One of the special features of the building's architecture is its façade. It presents a high portal niche with the main archway, which has now lost its original form. The lancet arch of the portal is filled by a complicated system of stalactite -like forms, which is a decorative motif made of terracotta and fixed on wooden sticks within the brickwork.

Research concerning this structure has given rise to speculations that the Mausoleum of Tekesh might have stood at the centre of some large construction that consisted of a multitude of buildings. Thus, certain scholars would argue that the building served a different purpose from that of a mausoleum, such as, for example, a House of Government or a Palace of the Great Khwarzm-shahs.

=== Kyrkmolla ===
Kyrkmolla is a 12-meter-high (39 ft) mound which used to constitute a fortress. It is located in the north-eastern outskirts of Gurgench. It is particularly significant as the earliest ceramics discovered at the site, dating back to the 5th century BC, were located here. It is protected by a thick mud-brick wall which dates back to the 10th to 14th centuries, and has been partially rebuilt after archaeological excavations.

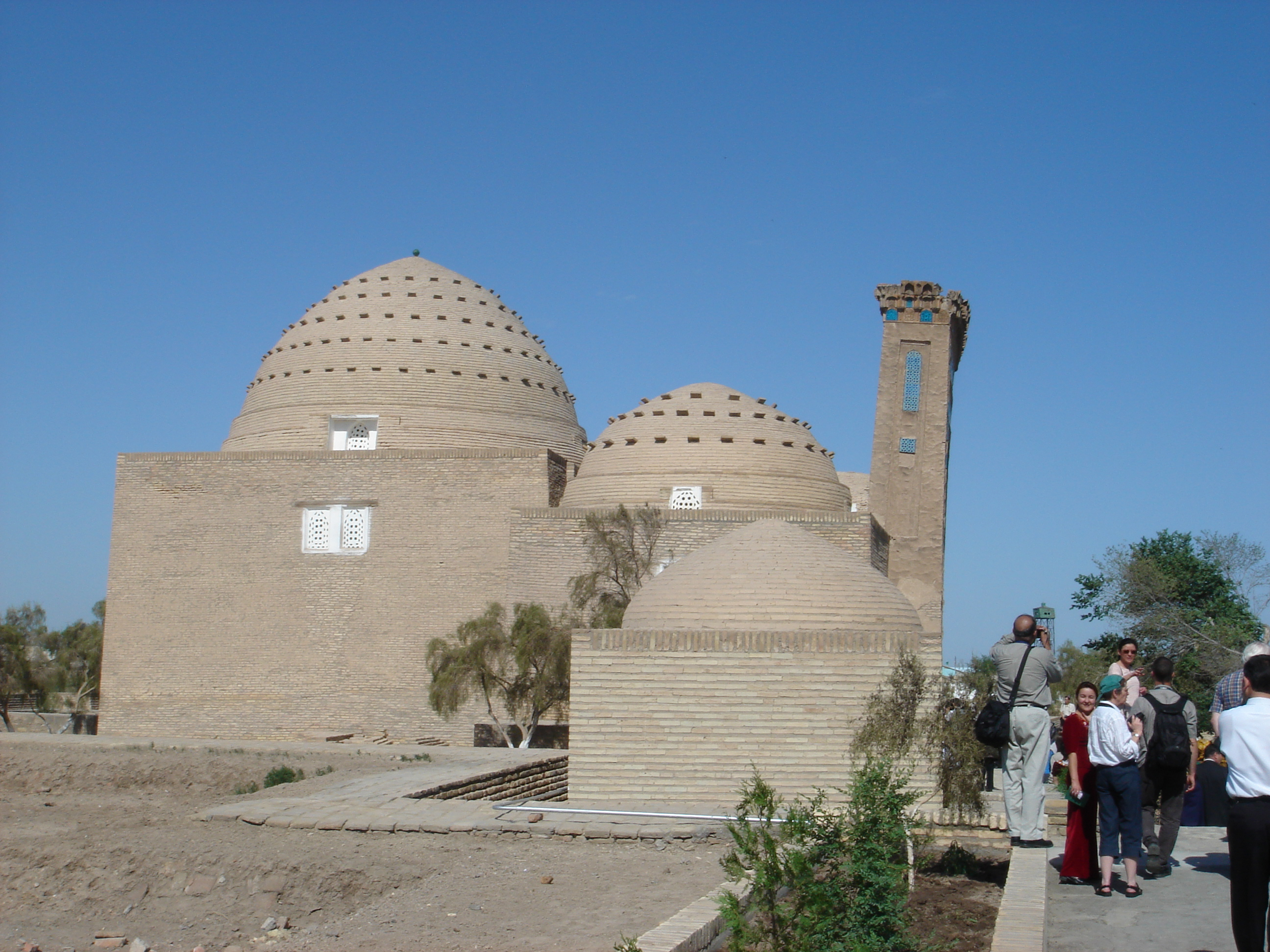
Najm ad-Din al-Kubra Mausoleum

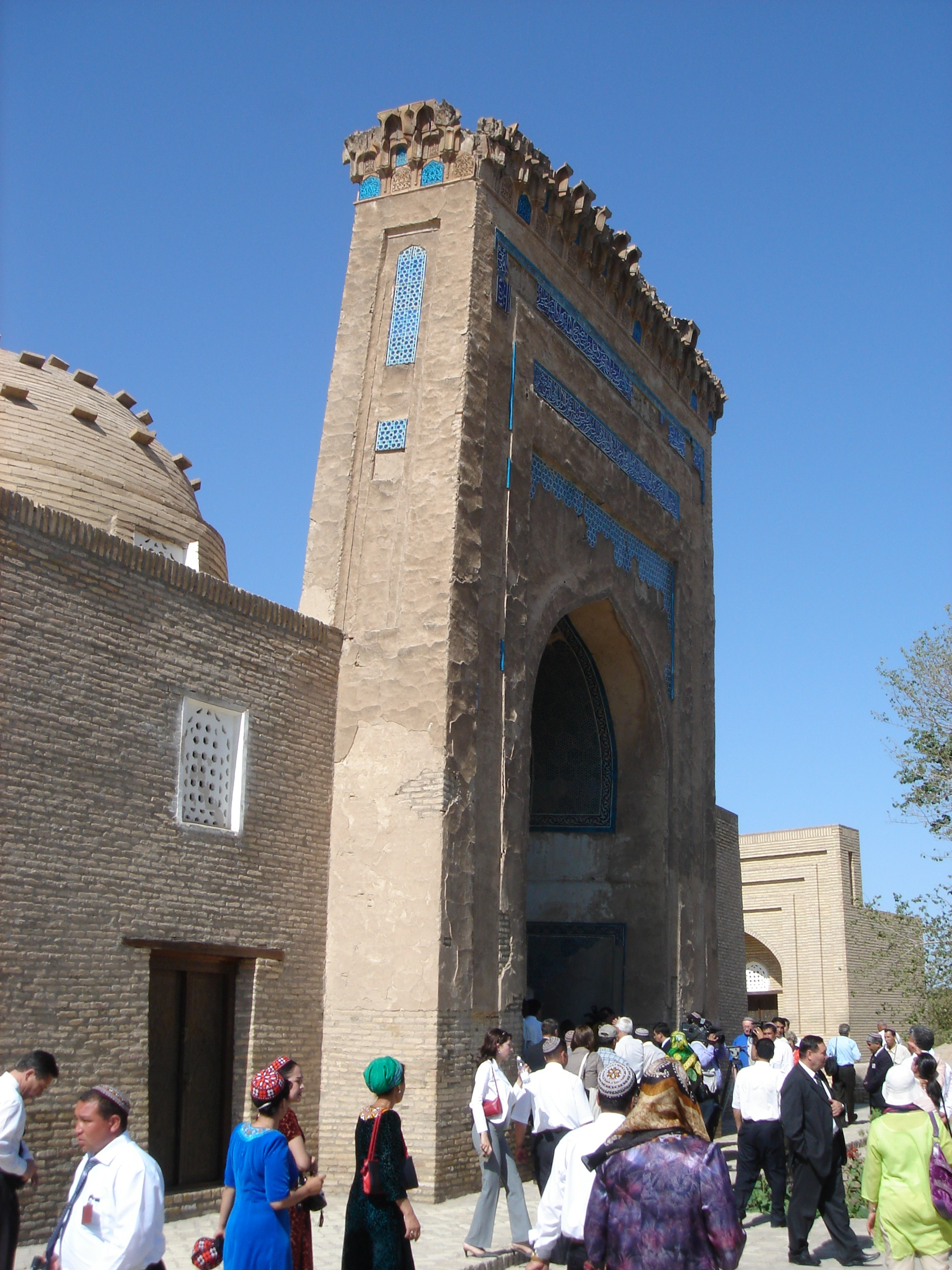
Portal in front of Najm ad-Din al-Kubra Mausoleum

=== Najm-ad-Din al-Kubra Mausoleum, Sultan Ali Mausoleum and Piryar Vali Mausoleum Complex ===
This complex is situated in the centre of the new town of Konye-Urgench, within a Muslim cemetery. The Najm-ad-Din al-Kubra Mausoleum was erected in the first half of the 14th century, and derives its name from the philosopher, painter, physician, chess master and general Najm al-Din Kubra, the founder of the Kubrawiya Sufi order. This is one of the structures which was rebuilt during the Khorezm era of prosperity, and also after the Mongol invasion.

The Mausoleum of Sultan Ali, who ruled in the 16th century, is located across. It is a hexagonal monument, with a dome measuring 9.5 meters in diameter.

The Mausoleum of Piryar Vali, a contemporary of Najm al-Din al-Kubra, is located to the west of the latter's mausoleum, and was built in the 13th and 14th centuries. It is 6.5 meters high and measures 7.5 meters in length.

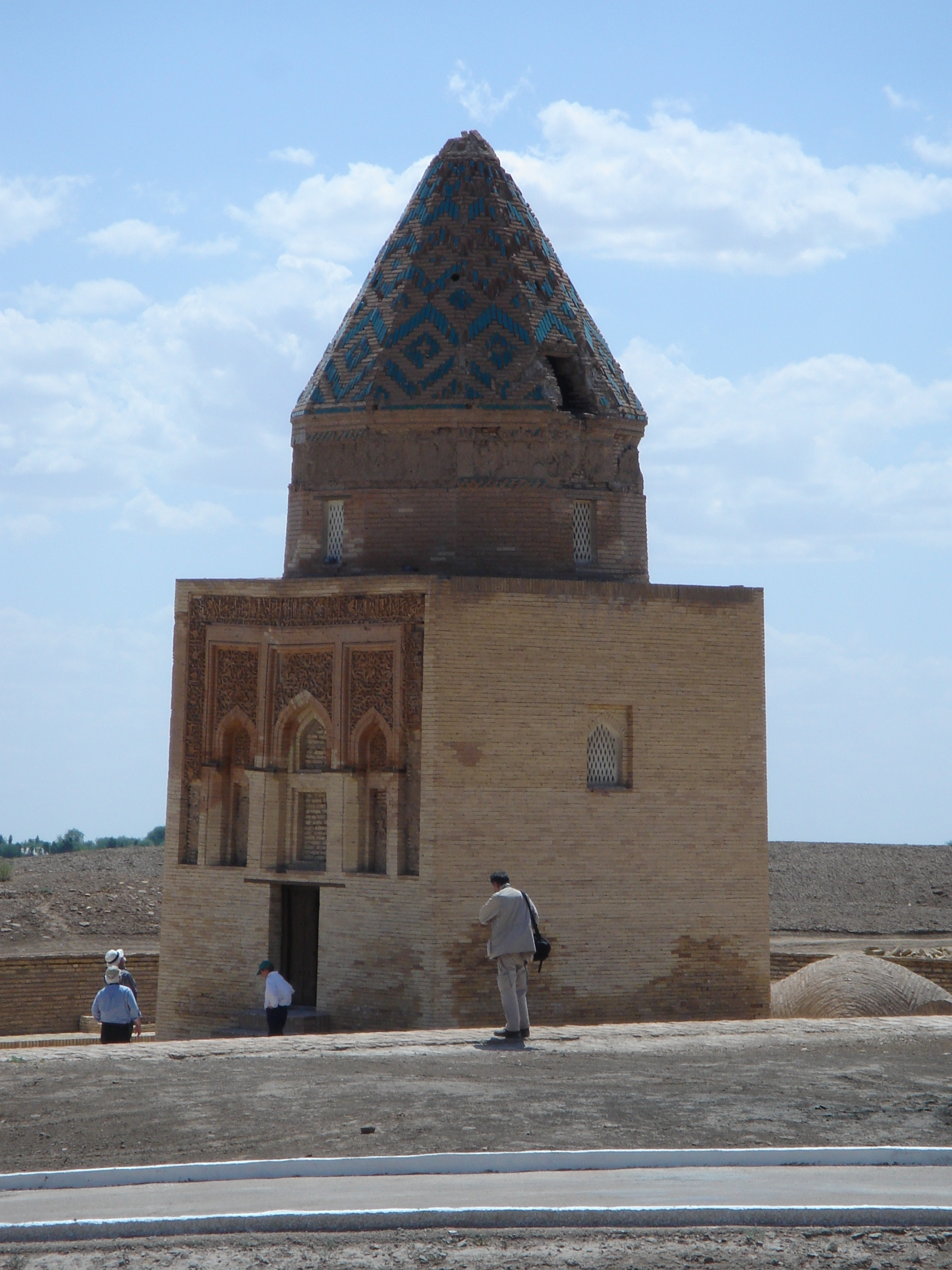
View of the Il Arslan Mausoleum, Konye-Urgench, Turkmenistan

=== Il Arslan Mausoleum ===
Il Arslan is also known among the people as the Mausoleum of Kho-Rezmshah II Arslan, who ruled from 1156 to 1172. The mausoleum, dating to the 12th century, is the oldest standing monument in Gurgench.

The building has a cuboidal structure of baked brick similar to the earliest existing Islamic mausoleum in Central Asia, the early 10th-century mausoleum of the Samanids in Bukhara, but instead of a hemispherical dome it has a faceted conical roof. The structure is decorated with a motif carved in relief into brick panels, a frieze containing an aphorism written in beautiful script, and with carved vegetal motifs displaying variations of an arabesque pattern. The decorative scheme of the dome presents a tiling technique executed in turquoise glazed brick tiles, forming a geometric pattern.

According to some of the latest scientific discoveries, one of the structure's functions, at a certain point, was that of storing water.

=== Ibn Khajib Complex ===
This monument is dedicated to Ibn Khajib, one of Najm-ad-Din al-Kubra's talented disciples. It is located in the western part of ancient Urgench and it consists of a complex of monuments, all constructed in different periods of time, from the 14th to the 19th centuries.

=== Ak-Kala ===
Ak-Kala is a fortress located southwest of the ruins of medieval Urgench. Its walls, whose height ranges from 6 to 8 meters, and which measure approximately 2 meters at the top, stretch on more than a kilometre. They were built with sun dried mud-bricks and their corners are decorated with semi-circular towers, whilst the inner side of the fortress wall is sustained by buttresses.

=== Khorezm-Bag ===
This is a quadrangular fortress, erected by Khan Muhammed Emin, measuring 400 by 500 meters, and was built in the mid-19th century in the south-western outskirts of Konye-Urgench. It is surrounded by a high defensive wall which has been severely eroded by the passing of time.

== Konye-Urgench Museum (Dash Mosque) ==
The museum is located in the brick structure the Dash Mosque, a former madrasa constructed in the early 20th century. It was built as a mosque and it served as a madrasah before it was turned into a site museum in the 1990s. Its structure is mainly square, with a multitude of rooms opening into a large courtyard, and which now house various exhibits.

The museum displays focus on the history of the site, on traditional arts and crafts of the region, on the building tradition of Urgench, etc. The largest room is dedicated to the history and treasures of the old city, including a comprehensive miniature model of Gurgench and a variety of artefacts such as ceramic bowls, glazed tiles, children's toys, or Arabic texts. Another important room centres around the Dash Mosque and the history of its construction and use. Around the courtyard, behind the main building, the remaining smaller rooms, formerly the bedrooms of the students at the madrasa, have been converted into 19 displays explaining the traditional handicrafts of the region such as carpet making, pottery, and Yurt construction.

== Building tradition ==
Konye-Urgench has been, for a long period of time, a prolific school of construction masters. The knowledge and skills of this school have spread, throughout the centuries, amongst the Muslim world, and can be recognised in the structures and decorations of many buildings from the Timur period, both within Turkmenistan, and in regions such as Uzbekistan, Afghanistan, Transcaucasia, Turkey, Iran, Pakistan and India. For example, a multitude of buildings in Samarkand were erected by builders and architects employed from Kunya Urgench in the 14th century.

The ingenuity and skill of the local craftsmen and architects can be seen in the exceptional construction details, such as structure, form or ornamentation, which have been perfected throughout time. Furthermore, traditional building techniques have survived to this day: for example, the kilns at Konye-Urgench are still used throughout the region for the production of bricks utilised in the reconstruction of historic buildings.

== Geography ==
=== Climate ===
Konye-Urgench has a cold desert climate (BWk in the Köppen climate classification), with long and hot summers. Winters are relatively short, but quite cold. Precipitation is scarce throughout the year, with an average of 109 mm (4.36 in).

Climate data for Konye-Urgench
| Month | Jan | Feb | Mar | Apr | May | Jun | Jul | Aug | Sep | Oct | Nov | Dec | Year |
|---|---|---|---|---|---|---|---|---|---|---|---|---|---|
| Mean daily maximum °C (°F) | 0.2 (32.4) | 2.7 (36.9) | 10.4 (50.7) | 20.7 (69.3) | 28.5 (83.3) | 33.4 (92.1) | 35.2 (95.4) | 32.6 (90.7) | 26.9 (80.4) | 17.9 (64.2) | 10.1 (50.2) | 3.1 (37.6) | 18.5 (65.3) |
| Daily mean °C (°F) | −4.0 (24.8) | −2.3 (27.9) | 4.8 (40.6) | 14.1 (57.4) | 21.3 (70.3) | 25.9 (78.6) | 27.9 (82.2) | 25.3 (77.5) | 19.3 (66.7) | 11.1 (52.0) | 5.0 (41.0) | 0.1 (32.2) | 12.4 (54.3) |
| Mean daily minimum °C (°F) | −8.0 (17.6) | −7.1 (19.2) | −0.5 (31.1) | 7.7 (45.9) | 14.2 (57.6) | 18.4 (65.1) | 20.7 (69.3) | 18.0 (64.4) | 11.7 (53.1) | 4.4 (39.9) | 0.0 (32.0) | −2.8 (27.0) | 6.4 (43.5) |
| Average precipitation mm (inches) | 9 (0.4) | 8 (0.3) | 17 (0.7) | 19 (0.7) | 13 (0.5) | 4 (0.2) | 3 (0.1) | 2 (0.1) | 3 (0.1) | 9 (0.4) | 10 (0.4) | 12 (0.5) | 109 (4.4) |
Source: Climate-data.org

== See also ==
- Khwarezm
- Khanate of Khiva
- List of World Heritage Sites in Turkmenistan
- The Mongol Invasion (trilogy)

| Preceded by - | Capital of Khwarazmian Empire; 1077–1212 | Succeeded by Samarkand |
| Preceded by Hamadan | Capital of Iran (Persia); 1194–1212 | Succeeded by Samarkand |
