= Battle of Bukhara (709) =

Umayyad victory in Transoxiana

- Part of Muslim conquest of Transoxiana
- Transoxiana in 8th century
Date	709
Location	Bukhara, Uzbekistan
Result	Umayyad victory
Territorial changes	Bukhara was captured by the Umayyads

Belligerents
Umayyad Caliphate	Sogdian city-states Gokturk Khaganate

Commanders and leaders
Qutayba ibn Muslim; Waki' bin Hassan al-Tamimi	Unknown

Strength
Unknown	Unknown

Casualties and losses
Unknown	Heavy

The Battle of Bukhara was a military engagement between the Umayyads and the Sogdian-Turkish alliance in 709. The battle ended in Umayyad victory and the conquest of Bukhara.

== Background ==
In 706, the Umayyad general Qutayba ibn Muslim led the conquest of Transoxinia. He crossed the Oxus River and besieged Paykend. The Umayyads successfully occupied it. Qutayba then led his armies for the conquest of Bukhara. The Umayyads launched two campaigns in 707 and 708, but both of them ended in failure. He was resisted by a local Bukharan ruler called Wardan-Khuda. The failure of the two campaigns led the Umayyad governor of Iraq, Al-Hajjaj ibn Yusuf, to rebuke Qutayba for his failures. In 709, Qutayba once again marched to Bukhara, this time motivated by the death of Wardan Khuda.

== Battle ==
When the Umayyads reached Bukhara, the inhabitants of Bukhara called for help from other Sogdians and Turks. An army of Sogdian-Turkish arrived for help and engaged the Muslims in battle. The Umayyads charged against them; however, they were repelled and forced to retreat to the camp. The Sogdian-Turkish army managed to enter and rampage the Muslims' camp. According to one story, the women in the camp began fighting back by hitting the faces of the horses, which led the soldiers to rally and repel the enemy, but this account could be false.

The fighting continued. The Turks were stationed on a hill on the other side of the river. The Umayyads were reluctant to cross the river and meet them. Qutayba began encouraging his men to fight. The chief of the Banu Tamim tribe, Waki' bin Hassan al-Tamimi, took the standard and began crossing the river. He began encouraging the cavalry commander to cross. Initially refusing, he began crossing the river. He led the cavalry up the hill. The infantry followed them. The cavalry attacked the Turks from the wings; the infantry charged and drove the Turks from the hill.

After this victory, the Muslims occupied Bukhara for the first time. The inhabitants made peace with the Muslims and allowed a Muslim garrison to reside in the citadel. The Umayyads restored Tugh-shada, son of Khatun of Bukhara, as the ruler of the city.

== Aftermath ==
Qutayba made procedures to spread Islam in the city. He replaced the fire temple in the citadel with a mosque and required people to worship there. He encouraged it by giving two dirhams for those who did. This generally attracted the poor side of the city. The Quran was read in Persian, and a man stood behind the worshippers, instructing them how to do prayers.

== Sources ==
- Percy Sykes (1940), A History Of Afghanistan Vol. I.
- Hugh Kennedy (2007), The Great Arab Conquests How The Spread Of Islam Changed the World We Live in.
- Touraj Daryaee (2012), The Oxford Handbook of Iranian History.
