= Sa'id ibn Salm al-Bahili =

Abbasid provincial governor and Commander

Sa'id ibn Salm al-Bahili سعيد بن سالم الباهلي

Abbasid governor of Jazira
- In office 796–797
- Monarch: Harun al-Rashid

Abbasid governor of Arminiya
- In office 796–797
- Monarch: Harun al-Rashid
- Preceded by: Ahmad ibn Yazid ibn Usayd al-Sulami
- Succeeded by: Nasr ibn Habib al-Muhallabi

Abbasid governor of Mosul
- Monarch: Harun al-Rashid

Abbasid governor of Tabaristan
- Monarch: Harun al-Rashid

Abbasid governor of Sind
- In office 780s–780s
- Monarch: Harun al-Rashid
- Deputy: Kathir ibn Salm al-Bahili

Personal details
- Died: Abbasid Caliphate
- Parent: Salm ibn Qutayba
- Relatives: Amr (brother); Muthanna (brother); Ibrahim (brother); Kathir (brother)
- Known for: Companion of Caliph al-Hadi

Military service
- Allegiance: Abbasid Caliphate
- Branch/service: Abbasid army
- Battles/wars: Arab–Khazar wars

Sa'id ibn Salm al-Bahili was an Arab governor and military commander of the early Abbasid Caliphate.

== Life ==
Sa'id was the scion of a prominent family of the Bahila tribe: his father, Salm ibn Qutayba, had served both the Umayyads and the Abbasids as governor of Basra, and his grandfather had been the distinguished general Qutayba ibn Muslim. Several of Sa'id's brothers and uncles also held high office.

In 776/7, he campaigned against Yusuf al-Barm in Khurasan. Sa'id was a close friend and boon-companion of Caliph al-Hadi (r. 785–786). He was with al-Hadi at Jurjan when news came of the death of his father, Caliph al-Mahdi, and al-Hadi's accession; together the two rode for Baghdad, where al-Hadi ascended the throne. According to an account preserved by al-Tabari, Sa'id held the highest rank at court under al-Hadi, succeeding his own brother Ibrahim.

Under Harun al-Rashid (r. 786–809) he was appointed to several provincial governorships. He was appointed to the Jazira in 796/7, and was governor of Arminiya in 799, during a Khazar raid into Abbasid territory. One account holds that the raid was provoked by Sa'id executing al-Munajjim al-Sulami—probably the local ruler of Derbent—prompting his son to go to the Khazars and ask for their help in obtaining revenge. The Khazars defeated Sa'id, who fled before them. It was only after Harun sent Khuzayma ibn Khazim and Yazid ibn Mazyad to the province that the Khazars were expelled and order restored. He also served as governor of Mosul, Tabaristan, and Sind (where he sent his brother Kathir as his deputy).

In 807, Harun appointed him as commandant of the fortress town of Mar'ash, at the border with the Byzantine Empire. The Byzantines raided the area and took several captives, but Sa'id did not move to oppose them. He is last attested in al-Tabari in 808/9.

== Sources ==
- Bosworth, C. E., ed. (1989). The History of al-Ṭabarī, Volume XXX: The ʿAbbāsid Caliphate in Equilibrium: The Caliphates of Mūsā al-Hādī and Hārūn al-Rashīd, A.D. 785–809/A.H. 169–192. SUNY Series in Near Eastern Studies. Albany, New York: State University of New York Press. ISBN 978-0-88706-564-4.
- Crone, Patricia (1980). Slaves on Horses: The Evolution of the Islamic Polity (1980 ed.). Cambridge: Cambridge University Press. ISBN 978-0521229616.
