= Ibrahim ibn Salm al-Bahili =

Ibrahim ibn Salm al-Bahili (Arabic: إبراهيم بن سالم الباهلي) was an Arab governor of the early Abbasid Caliphate.

Ibrahim was the scion of a prominent family of the Bahila tribe: his father, Salm ibn Qutayba, had served both the Umayyads and the Abbasids as governor of Basra, and his grandfather had been the distinguished general Qutayba ibn Muslim. Several of his brothers and uncles also held high office.

Ibrahim, like his brother Sa'id, was a close friend of Caliph al-Hadi (r. 785–786), who appointed him governor of the Yemen. Indeed, according to an account preserved by al-Tabari, Ibrahim held the highest rank at court under al-Hadi, and after his death was succeeded by his own brother Sa'id.

== Sources ==
- Bosworth, C. E., ed. (1989). The History of al-Ṭabarī, Volume XXX: The ʿAbbāsid Caliphate in Equilibrium: The Caliphates of Mūsā al-Hādī and Hārūn al-Rashīd, A.D. 785–809/A.H. 169–192. SUNY Series in Near Eastern Studies. Albany, New York: State University of New York Press. ISBN 978-0-88706-564-4.
- Crone, Patricia (1980). Slaves on Horses: The Evolution of the Islamic Polity (1980 ed.). Cambridge: Cambridge University Press. ISBN 978-0521229616.
