= Conquest of Paikand (706) =

- Part of Muslim conquest of Transoxiana
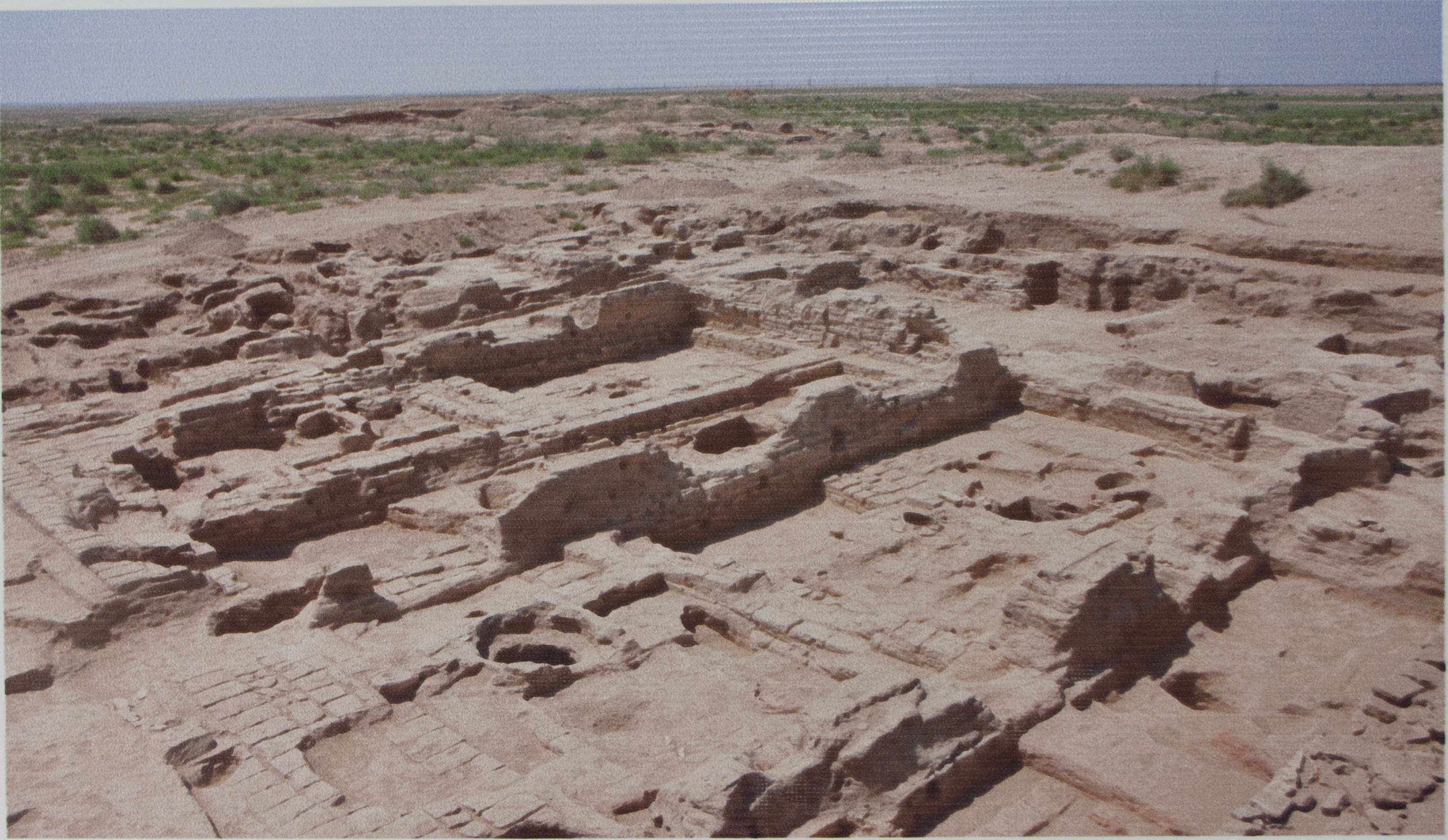
- Ruins of Paikand
| Date | 706 |
| Location | Paykend, Uzbekistan |
| Result | Umayyad victory |
| Territorial changes | Paikand was conquered by the Umayyads |

Belligerents
| Umayyad Caliphate | Sogdian city-states |

Commanders and leaders
| Qutayba ibn Muslim | Unknown |

Strength
| Unknown | Unknown |

Casualties and losses
| Unknown | All defenders killed |

The Conquest of Paykand was a military engagement between the Umayyads and the Sogdians who ruled Paikand. The Umayyads, led by Qutayba ibn Muslim, managed to conquer the city for the first time; however, the city rebelled, which led Qutayba to reconquer it again.

== Background ==
The ancient city of Paykend was wealthy and gained reputation for the fine quality of armor made there. Paikand was also a resting place for travelers and famous for being a merchant city. Many Transoxians lived there for the quality of life. The city was also famous for its many fortifications around the city. The Umayyad general, Qutayba ibn Muslim, began his campaigns in Transoxinia in 706. His real objective was the conquest of the rich Sogidan city states. Qutayba began crossing the Oxus River and aimed to capture Paykand.

== Conquest ==
Qutayba arrived in Paikand in 706. The city was well protected by great mudbrick walls and an inner citadel with only one gate. The siege began, which lasted for two months. The Muslims assaulted the walls, which forced the defenders to retreat to the citadel. There, the defenders were forced to ask for peace. The peace was granted in exchange for tribute. The Muslims also left a small number of men as garrisons in the city. Qutayba then left the city for Merv. The inhabitants of the city thought the attack was a mere raid. Thus the Sogidans revolted and killed the Arab governor who ruled the city.

As he was leaving, Qutayba learned of the uprising happening in the city and returned to deal with the revolt. Qutayba once again besieged the city. After a month, the Muslims began undermining the walls in hopes of destroying them. The attack succeeded, but the walls fell on the workers and killed them. The Muslims assaulted the walls without difficulty, and the city was taken with force. All the defenders were killed, and the women and children were taken captives. Many of the merchants were said to have been off on a trading expedition to China. When they returned, they searched for their wives and children, ransomed them from the Muslims, and began rebuilding the city.

The Muslims also acquired a great amount of wealth and booty. They found a silver statue in a Buddhist shrine weighing 4,000 dirhams and other treasures, including two pearls the size of pigeons’ eggs.

== Aftermath ==
The conquest of Paikand alerted the princes and merchants in Transoxinia about the danger of the Muslim invasion. The feud between Waranda and Bukhara was settled. The Sogdians began preparing their forces to resist the Umayyads. After the victory at Paikand, the Umayyads moved on to the Bukhara oasis, where some villages were attacked and obliged to make peace.

== Sources ==
- Gibb, H. A. R (1923), The Arab conquests in Central Asia.
- Hugh Kennedy (2007), The Great Arab Conquests How The Spread Of Islam Changed the World We Live in.
- Sadriddin Ayni (2023), Tajikistan's National Epics, Muqanna's Rebellion, and The Tajik People's Hero Temur Malik.
