= Elephant of Yusuf al-Bahili =

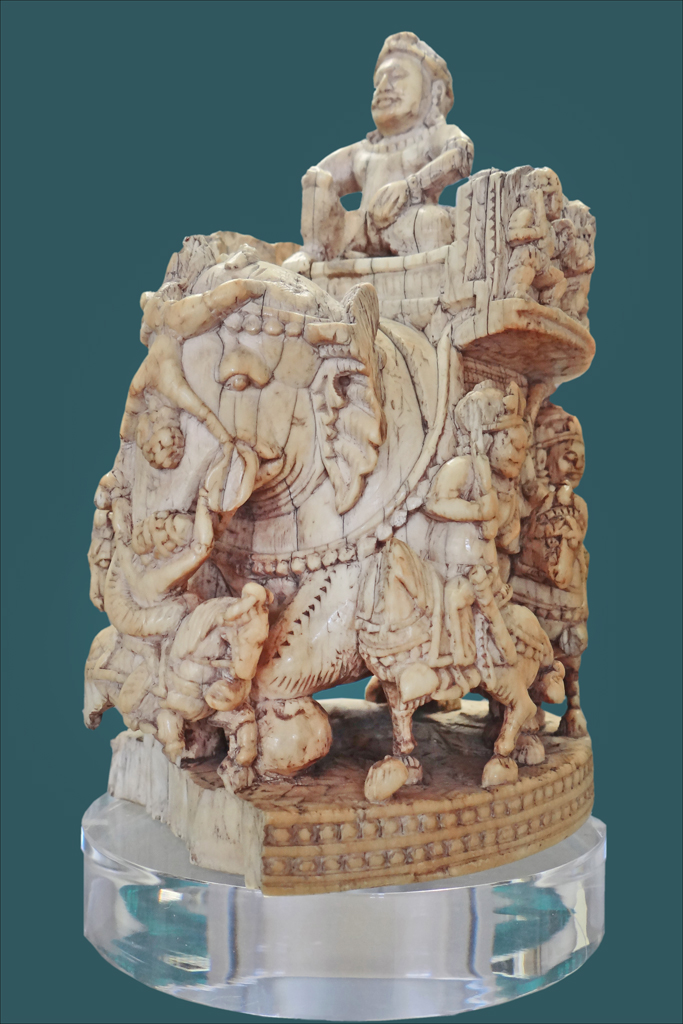

The elephant of Yūsuf al-Bāhilī or Eléphant de Charlemagne, once regarded as one of the Charlemagne chessmen and so known as the Chessman of Charlemagne, is an ivory sculpture, possibly originally part of a chess set and probably carved in Sindh in the 9th century AD. It has been in Paris since at least the 16th century.

== Date and place of origin ==
The date and place of its manufacture are uncertain. Tradition holds that it was among the gifts of the Caliph Harūn al-Rashīd (786–809) to the Emperor Charlemagne (768–814) at the height of Abbasid–Carolingian diplomacy. There is an inscription on the underside of the base in Arabic written in Kufic script. On the basis of its style, the inscription has been dated to the 9th century, which provides a terminal date for its production. The carving itself has been variously dated between the 8th and 15th centuries on the basis of its style. Avinoam Shalem favours an 8th- or 9th-century date, while Finbarr Barry Flood favours the 9th or 10th century.

The inscription on the base reads min ʾamala Yūsuf al-Bāhilī, "from the work (labour) of Yūsuf al-Bāhilī". The name may refer to the craftsman or the owner. He was a member of the Bahila tribe of Bedouin who lived in the vicinity of Basra in southern Iraq. The carving may have produced in or around Basra. However, on stylistic grounds, it is often associated with India. Places ranging from Gujarat to the Deccan have been proposed. It may have been brought to Baghdad in the 9th or 10th century along with other Indian exotica. One member of the Bahila, ʿAmr ibn Muslim al-Bāhilī, was the governor of Sindh under the Caliph ʿUmar II (r. 717–720). His descendants may have remained in the region. A connection with Sindh is further suggested by the fact that the Habbarid emir of Mansura kept 80 war elephants, while the emir of Multan is known to have used elephants in processions. Both emirs appear to have adopted Indian dress.

The earliest certain reference to the elephant is from 1505, when it appears in an inventory of the Abbey of Saint-Denis alongside the unrelated Charlemagne chessmen, which were made in Italy in the 11th century. It belonged to the abbey until 1789, when, during the French Revolution, it was taken to the Cabinet des Médailles, where it remains today. Its current inventory number is Inv.55.311. It is also Chabouillet 3271.

== Description ==
The carving is 15.5 centimetres (6.1 in) tall and 8.9 centimetres (3.5 in) in diameter. It is carved in the round, i.e., intended to be viewed from all angles. It depicts an oversized royal rider in a howdah atop an elephant. The howdah is surrounded by eight infantrymen, much smaller, on a ledge or projection running round the howdah. At ground level, five mounted cavalrymen run around the legs of the elephant. They are intermediate in size between the royal figure and the infantry, but large in relation to their horses. The elephant depicted is an Indian elephant, but the ivory itself is probably from an African elephant.

The carving has Kashmiri characteristics, but this is probably due to influence from Kashmiri workshops and not an origin in Kashmir, where most carvings are Buddhist reliefs. Yūsuf al-Bāhilī's elephant is not characteristically Buddhist or obviously religious, nor does it have typically Islamic characteristics. The meaning of the scene depicted is uncertain. It may represent the ideal political order of the Arthashastra, in which a universal ruler (chakravartin) is surrounded by concentric "circles of kings", adversaries and allies (i.e., the infantryman on the howdah and the cavalryman on the ground). Or, it may have a more mundane meaning, an idealized representation of a maharaja and his samantas (vassals) or, if it was fashioned in Sindh, of an Islamic emir.

The carving has been interpreted as a chess piece. Indian pieces this large are attested in the 10th century by al-Masʿūdī, who reports that game pieces were the most common use of ivory in India. There is an "almost identical" ivory piece in the Museum of Asian Art in Berlin. It is smaller, of poorer quality and much more damaged than the Paris ivory, but it is carved in the round and shows an elephant with a howdah surrounded by riders in a similar style.

In 2020, Dai Nippon Printing produced a 3D model of the ivory for the museum, which is available online.

== Bibliography ==
- Avisseau-Broustet, Mathilde (2022). "L'éléphant de Charlemagne". Le Blog Gallica: La Bibliothèque numérique de la BnF et de ses partenaires.
- Contadini, Anna (1995). "Islamic Ivory Chess Pieces, Draughtsmen and Dice in the Ashmolean Museum". In James W. Allan (ed.). Islamic Art in the Ashmolean Museum. Vol. X. Oxford University Press. pp. 30–51. ISBN 978-0-19-728020-1.
- Flood, Finbarr Barry (2011). "Conflict and Cosmopolitanism in 'Arab' Sind". In Rebecca M. Brown; Deborah S. A. Hutton (eds.). A Companion to Asian Art and Architectur (PDF). Blackwell. pp. 365–397.
- Shalem, Avinoam (2004). The Oliphant: Islamic Objects in Historical Context. Brill.
