= Hatim ibn al-Nu'man =

Hatim ibn al-Nu'man al-Bahili (Ḥātim ibn al-Nuʾmān al-Bāhilī; fl. 656 – c. 685) was an Arab tribal noble and commander under the Umayyad caliph Mu'awiya I.

== Life ==
Hatim ibn al-Nu'man was a sharif (tribal noble) of the Bahila, a Qaysi tribe, in Basra, one of the principal Arab garrison towns of Iraq. He thereafter settled in the Jazira (Upper Mesopotamia). During the First Fitna, he was among the sharifs expelled from Iraq by Caliph Ali (r. 656–661). Hatim fought on the side of the Umayyad governor of Syria, Mu'awiya ibn Abi Sufyan, against Ali's forces at the Battle of Siffin in 657. Mu'awiya ultimately emerged victorious and became caliph in 661. During his reign, in 665 or 666, Hatim was among the commanders dispatched to govern parts of Khurasan, the eastern frontier of the Caliphate, according to the 9th-century history of al-Tabari.

During the Second Fitna, he defected from the Umayyads, and joined their rivals, the Zubayrids, who held sway over Iraq and much of the Jazira. Under the Zubayrid governor of Mosul, Ibrahim ibn al-Ashtar, Hatim served as the deputy governor of the Jaziran towns of Harran and Edessa.

His descendants, known as the 'Banu Hatim' after him, served as governors of the Jazira and the affiliated provinces of Armenia and Adharbayjan under the Umayyad Caliphate, and were active participants of the Qays against Yaman, their rivals for power and influence in the Caliphate.

== Bibliography ==
- Crone, Patricia (1980). Slaves on Horses: The Evolution of the Islamic Polity (1980 ed.). Cambridge: Cambridge University Press. ISBN 978-0521229616.
- Morony, Michael G., ed. (1987). The History of al-Ṭabarī, Volume XVIII: Between Civil Wars: The Caliphate of Muʿāwiyah, 661–680 A.D./A.H. 40–60. SUNY Series in Near Eastern Studies. Albany, New York: State University of New York Press. ISBN 978-0-87395-933-9.
