= Abu Umamah al-Bahili =

Abu Umamah Al-Bahili
- أَبُو أُمَامَةَ ٱلۡبَاهِلِي
- Died: 81 or 86 AH; Homs, Umayyad Caliphate

Abu Umamah al-Bahili (Arabic: أَبُو أُمَامَةَ ٱلۡبَاهِلِي, romanized: Abū ʾUmāmah Al-Bāhili; d. 81 or 86 AH) was a companion of Muhammad, and the last of them to die in Syria.

== Life ==
Abu Umamah was of the Bāhila tribe, itself descending from the Qays. His personal name was Ṣadiy (Arabic: صدي, romanized: Ṣadiy), and his father's name was `Ajlān, Wahb, or `Amr. In a hadith narrated by Al-Tabarani, it can be inferred that Abu Umamah fought at the Battle of Uhud. However, Ibn Hajar al-Asqalani commented on this narration, saying its chain of narration is ḍa`īf (weak). Abu Umamah is known to have resided in Homs, which was part of the Bilad al-Sham region, and died there in 81 or 86 AH. There is some difference of opinion as to whether he resided in Egypt before moving to Homs. He fought alongside Ali in the Battle of Siffin, and later settled in Syria.
