= Charlemagne chessmen =

Group of 11th-century chess pieces

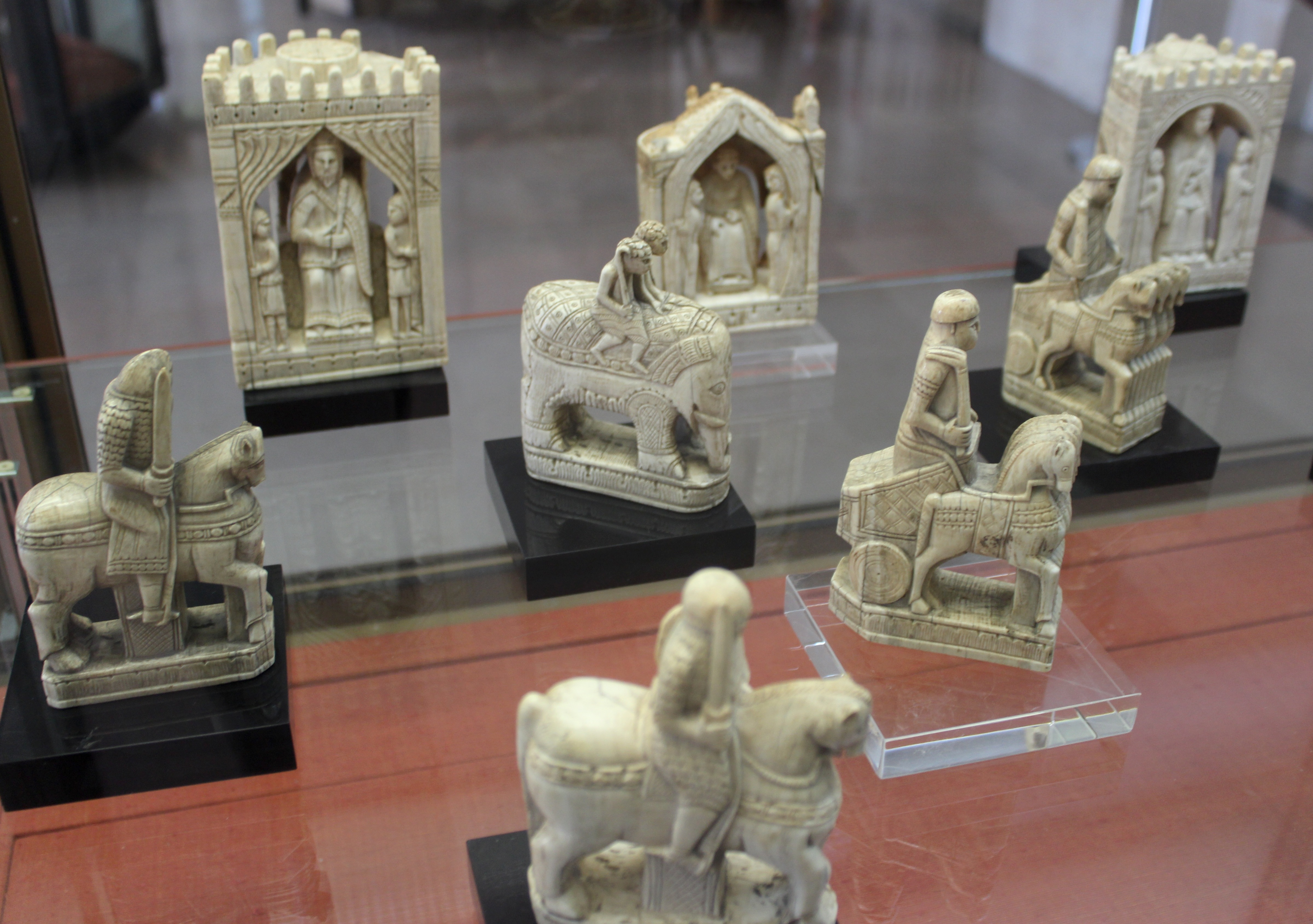
- The Charlemagne chessmen
- Material: ivory
- Created: 11th century
- Present location: Bibliothèque nationale de France

The Charlemagne chessmen are a group of 11th century chess pieces made from ivory, now in the Cabinet des Médailles, Bibliothèque Nationale in Paris, France. In 1598 the set contained 30 pieces, but after the French Revolution only 16 pieces survived. Next to the Lewis chessmen, the set is thought to be the second-most important collection of medieval chess pieces in the world. It is one of the best-preserved sets of figures from the High Middle Ages.

Their name comes from the legend that they belonged to Charlemagne, the first Holy Roman Emperor, who died in 814, but, with the exception of one earlier piece, they are actually thought to have been made more than 200 years after his death, probably in southern Italy. They were in the Treasury of Saint-Denis at Saint Denis Abbey near Paris by the 13th century.

== Legend ==
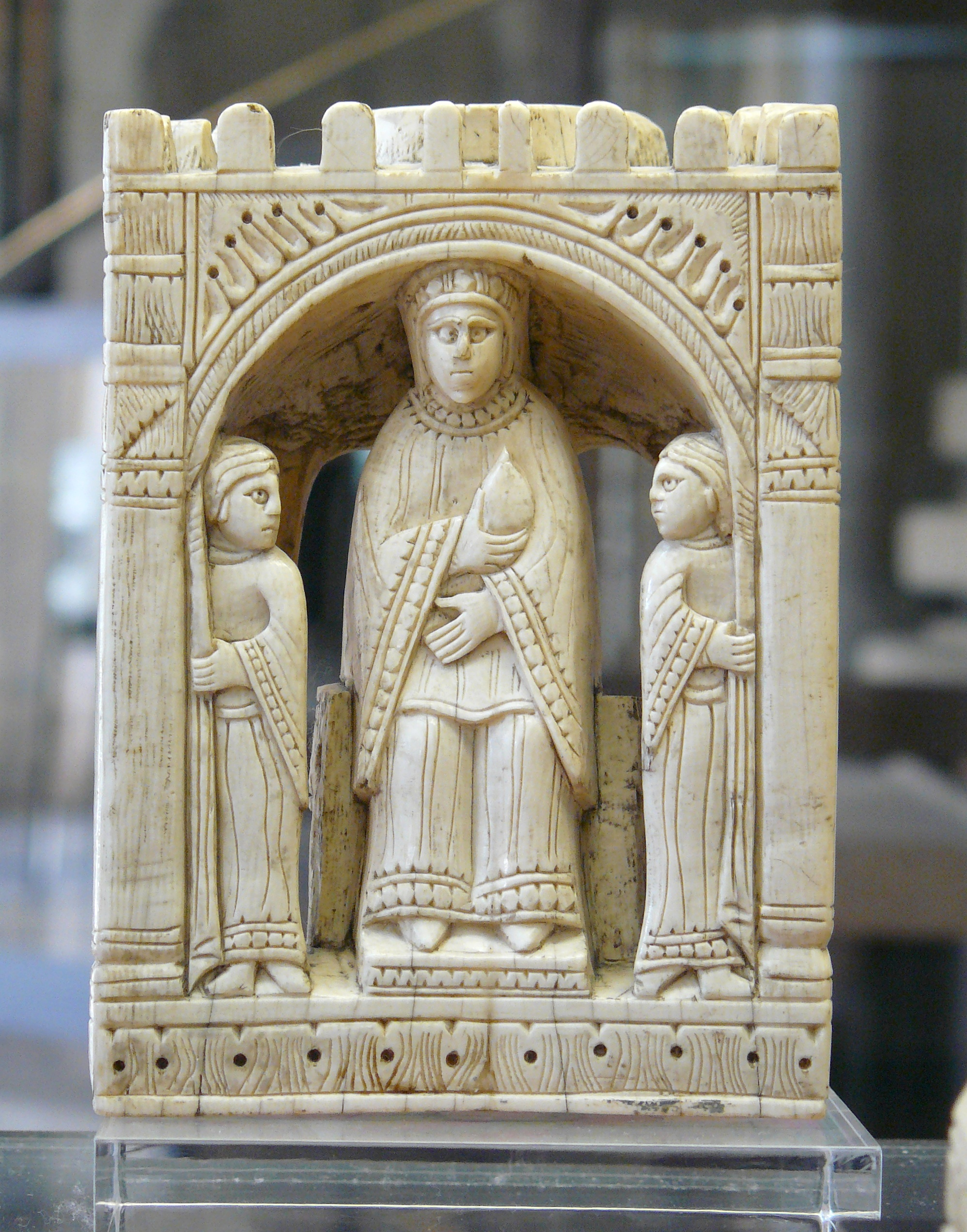
Queen

The legend regarding the set states that these chessmen were given as a gift to Charlemagne by Caliph Harun al-Rashid, who was an avid chess player. The fact that the set displays elephants instead of bishops and chariots instead of rooks denotes a form of the Perso-Arabic game known as Shatranj, itself coming from the original Indian Chaturanga (which compound word means the 'Four Bodies' of the traditional army: infantry, cavalry, elephants and chariots). If this story were true, it would be evidence that chess was played in Europe centuries earlier than previously thought. However, the ancient sources do not confirm the legend: in the book of anecdotes concerning the life of Charlemagne from the 880s by Notker the Stammerer, who describes the mission sent by Harun to Charlemagne in 802 AD, the list of gifts sent by the Caliph includes a (real) elephant and various other items but no set of chessmen, while Einhard's Life of Charlemagne and the Royal Frankish Annals provide also an arrival of an elephant named Abul-Abbas, again without mention of the chess pieces.

The other legend, according to which the game was a gift from the Byzantine Empress Irene of Athens (d. 803), also lacks support. In fact, the pieces of the set were made at least two centuries later than this. Only the large elephant piece—the Elephant of Charlemagne—which was once treated as a part of the set, but is now recognized as a separate piece, of Indian origin (still interpreted as a Chaturanga or Shatranj piece), could have been given to Charlemagne together with the living elephant, since this single piece is dated to the 9th century.

There is another legend linking Charlemagne and the game of chess, located in the Battle of Roncevaux Pass. According to the legend, Charlemagne was playing chess when he heard Roland's olifant. In the Museuf of Roncesvalles there is a reliquary resembling a chess-board (actually a 7x9 box) called Charlemagne's chess-board.

== History ==
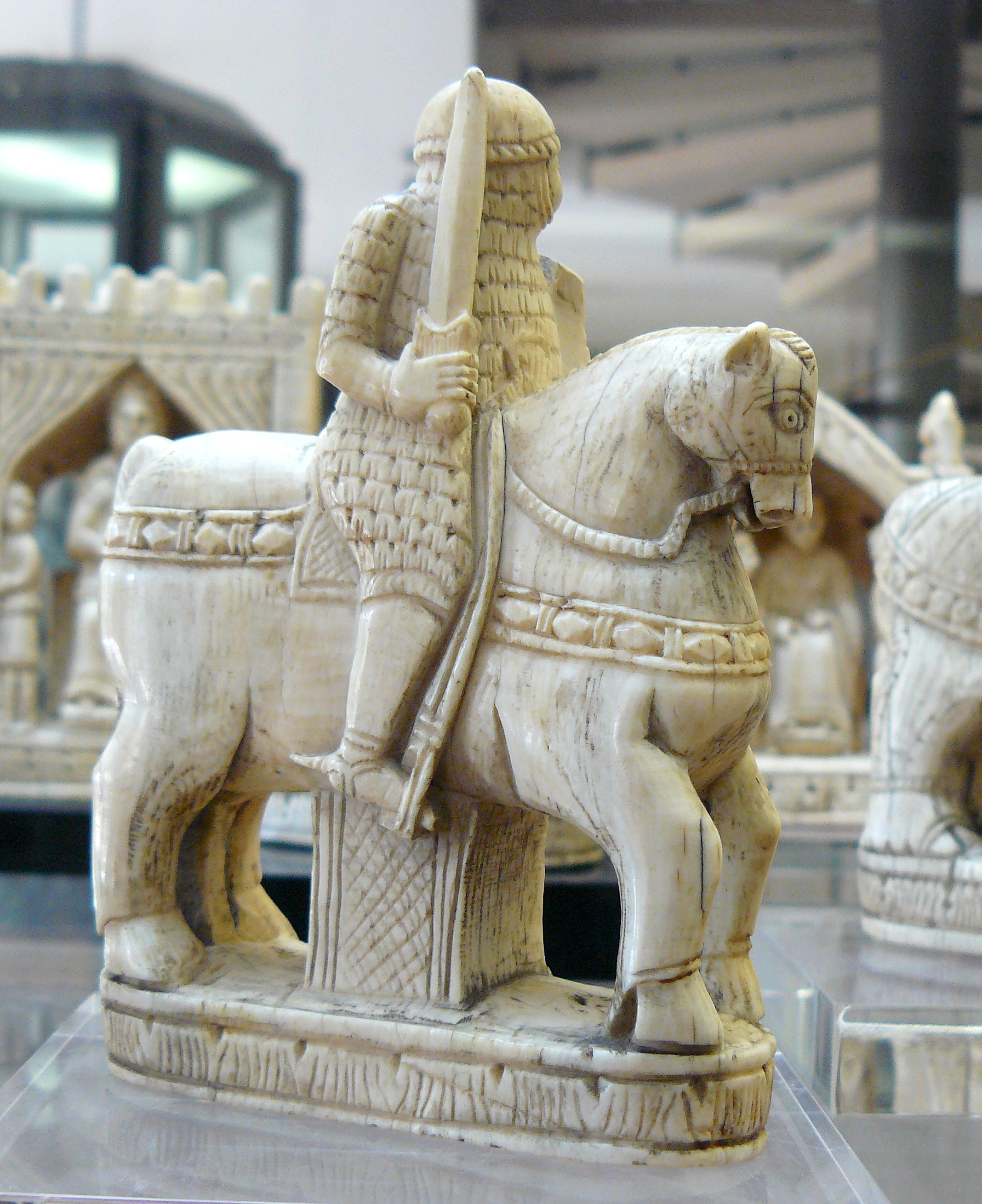
Knight

The set is estimated to have been made between 1050 and 1100 in Salerno, Italy. According to one historian, "The fact that these pieces are figurative representations of people and animals rather than abstract Islamic designs also suggest that they were made in Europe rather than imported from somewhere within the Caliphate."

Various theories concern its original owners. Possibly it was created for Robert Guiscard (died 1085), a Norman leader, or even for Pope Gregory VII. Later it was a gift to a French king, either Philip II or Philip III.

From the 13th to 18th centuries, the set was in the Treasury of Saint-Denis at Saint Denis Abbey near Paris. In 1598, the set was inventoried and stated to be a set of 30 pieces. In 1625, the set was first associated with Charlemagne in a report on the history of the abbey.

During the French Revolution, when property was confiscated from the clergy, only 16 of the 30 pieces survived and were stored at the Cabinet des Médailles, Bibliothèque Nationale in 1794.

== Description ==
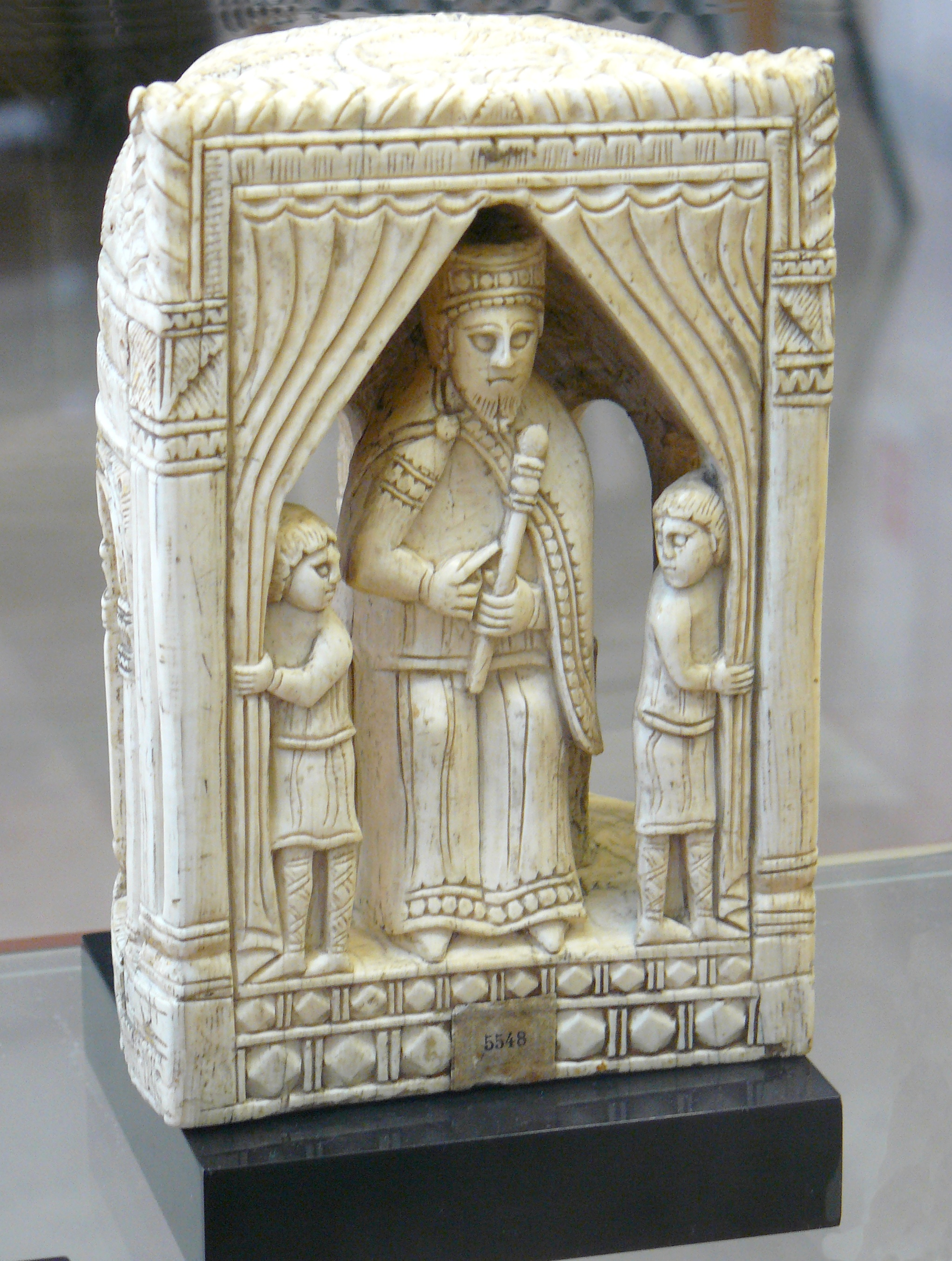
King

The chess pieces are all carved from blocks of ivory, which measure up to 15 cm in height, while the kings weigh almost up to 1 kg. There are also traces of red paint on some of the figures.

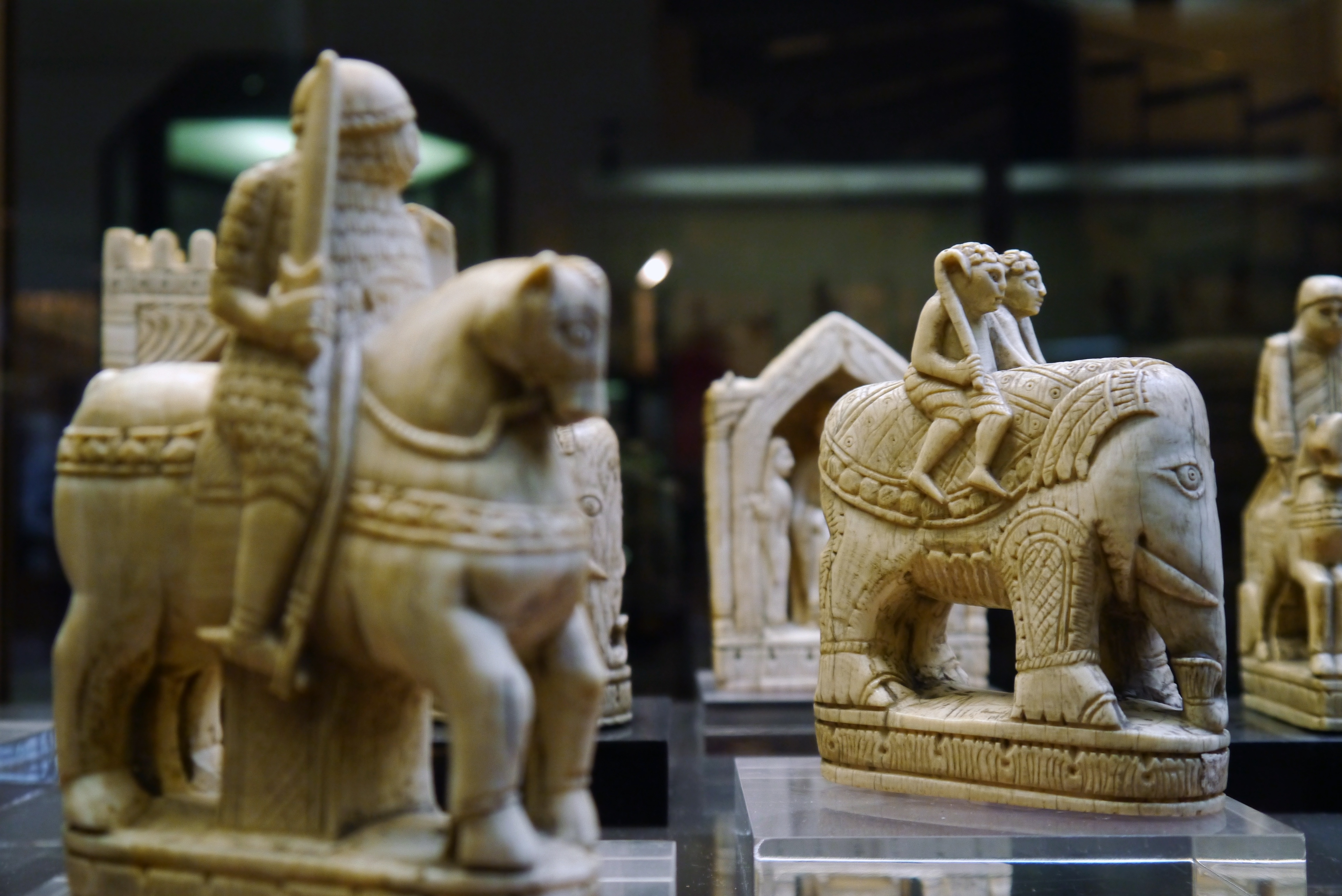
Knight and elephant (replacing bishops)

Like in the Shatranj, chariots replace rooks and elephants replace bishops. Elephant was called in Arabic al-fīl, giving Spanish alfil, Italian alfiere, French fil, fol and fou.

The human figures are clothed and armed in the Norman style, as depicted in the Bayeux Tapestry. The figures thus belong to the Norman–Sicilian style, which mixes of European, Arabic-Islamic and Byzantine artistic styles.

The "housing", which is elaborated with architectural details and emphasizes the king and queen, is peculiar. The carvings each show a semicircular pavilion with arcades on the back and a straight front in the shape of a ciborium. In the scene, servants pull up a curtain from both sides, which previously shielded the appearance of the king or queen and the room behind. It is the revelation of the monarch, the climax of the Byzantine court ceremony.

Only sixteen pieces of the original set survive. Missing from the set are 15 pawns and a rook, as a complete chess set has thirty-two pieces, including sixteen pawns. The surviving pieces are:

- two kings
- two queens
- three quadrigas (rook)
- four knights
- four elephants (bishop);
- one foot soldier (pawn).

== Gallery ==
=== King ===
Skip image slideshow
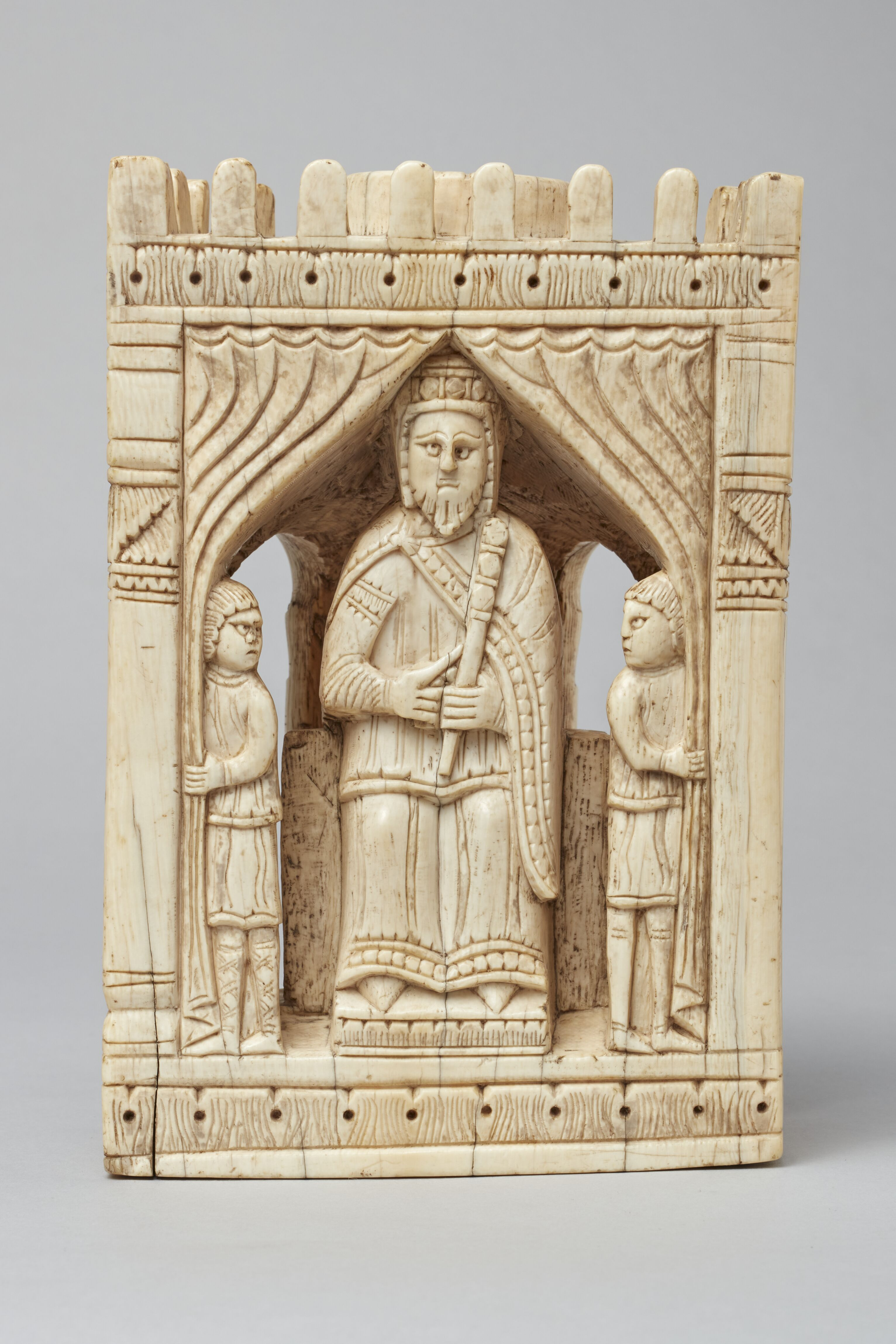
King (btv1b10060088d)

=== Queens ===
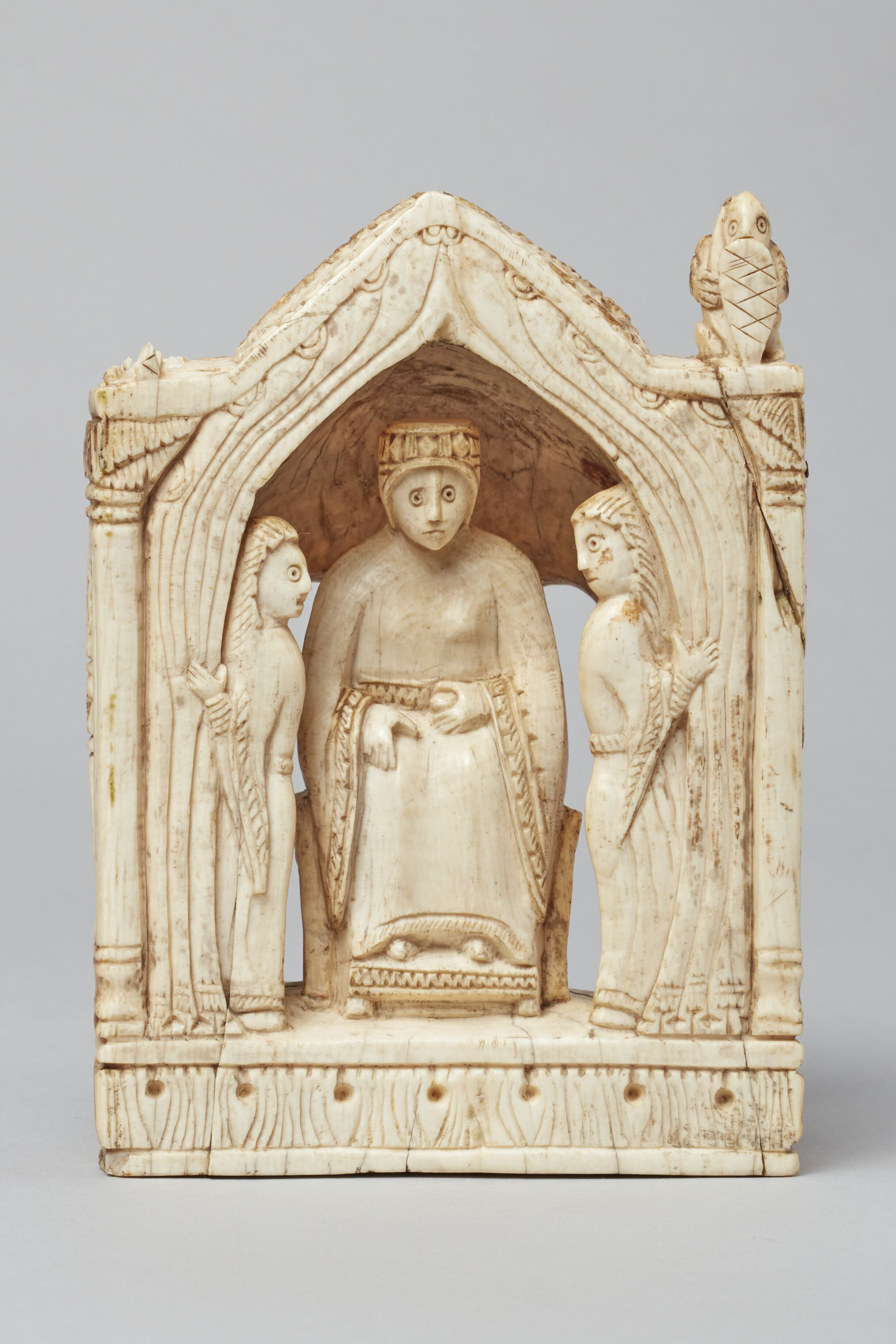
Skip image slideshow Queen (btv1b10060089v)

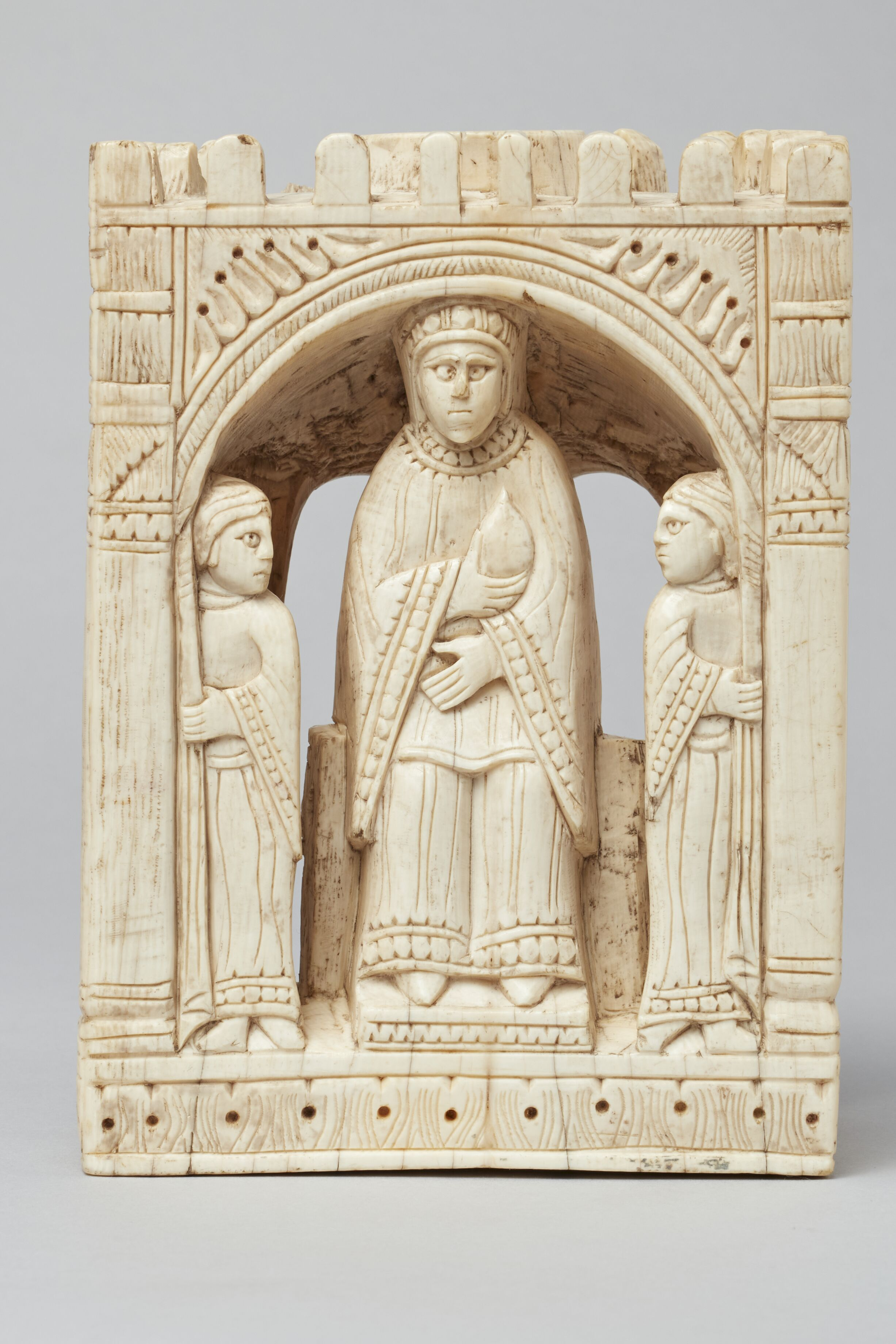
Skip image slideshow Queen (btv1b10060118w)

=== Horse ===
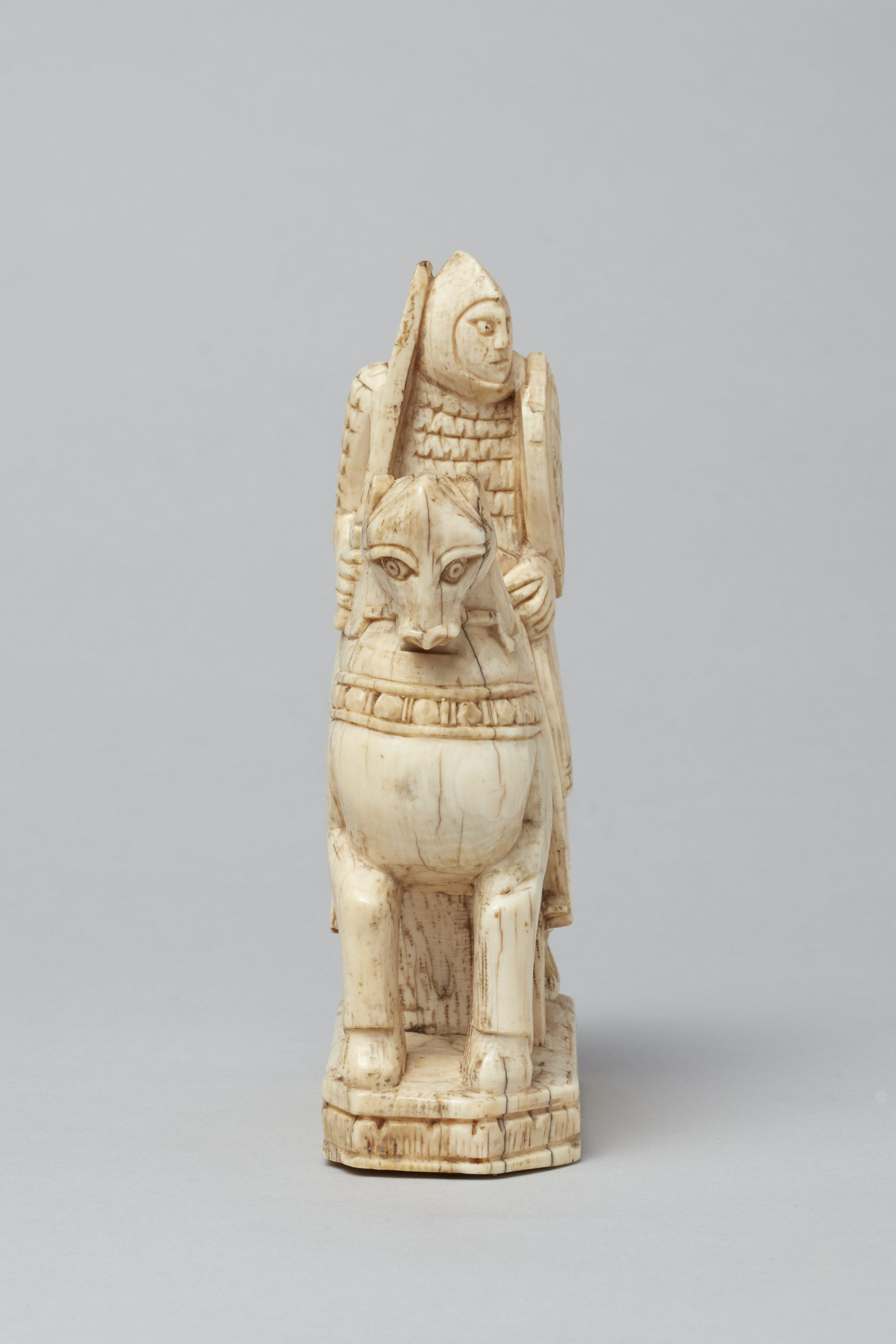
Skip image slideshow Horseman with pointed shield (btv1b10060097c)

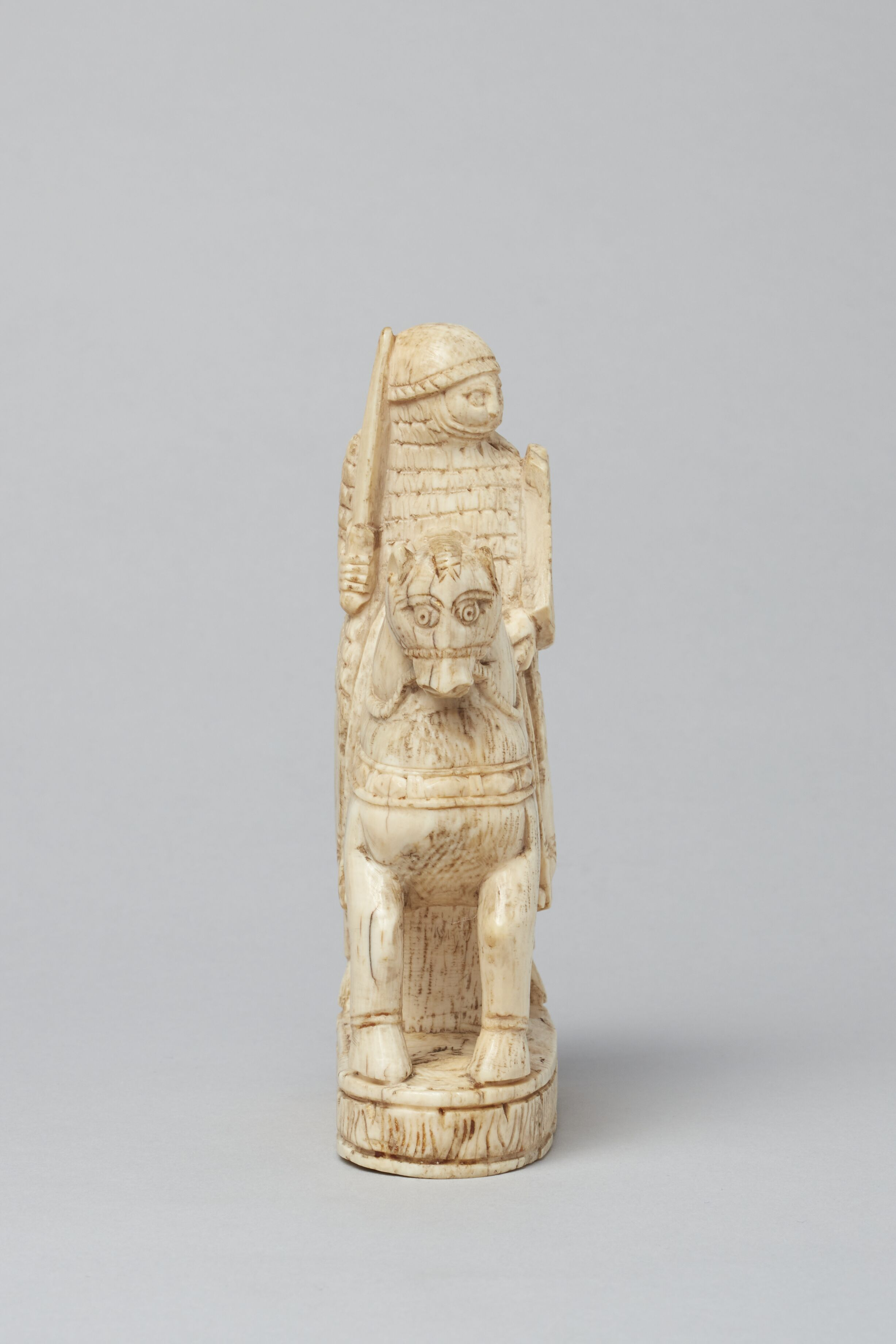
Skip image slideshow Horseman with rounded shield (btv1b10060098t)

=== Quadrigas (rook) and elephant (bishop) ===
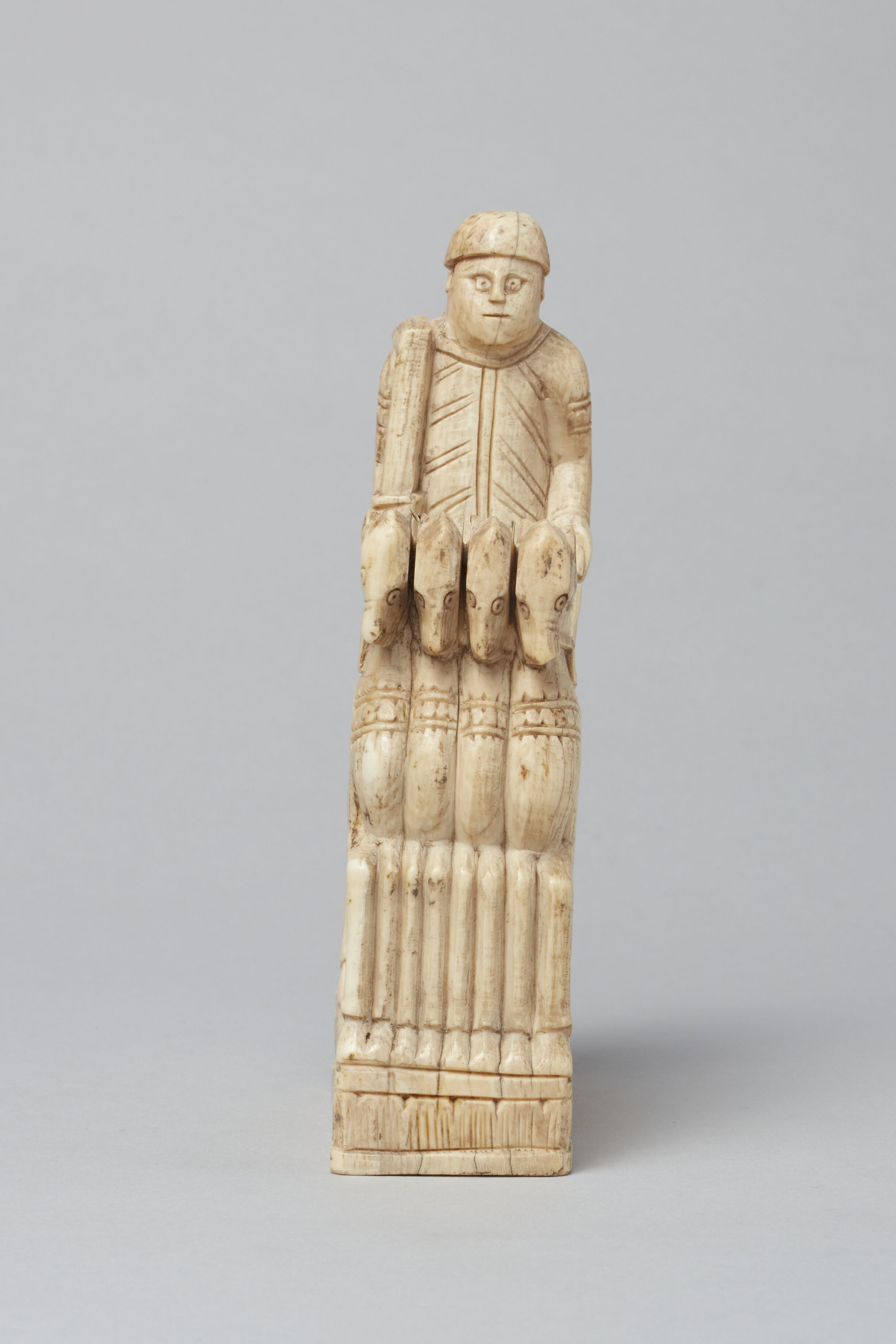
Skip image slideshow Quadriga (btv1b10060094)

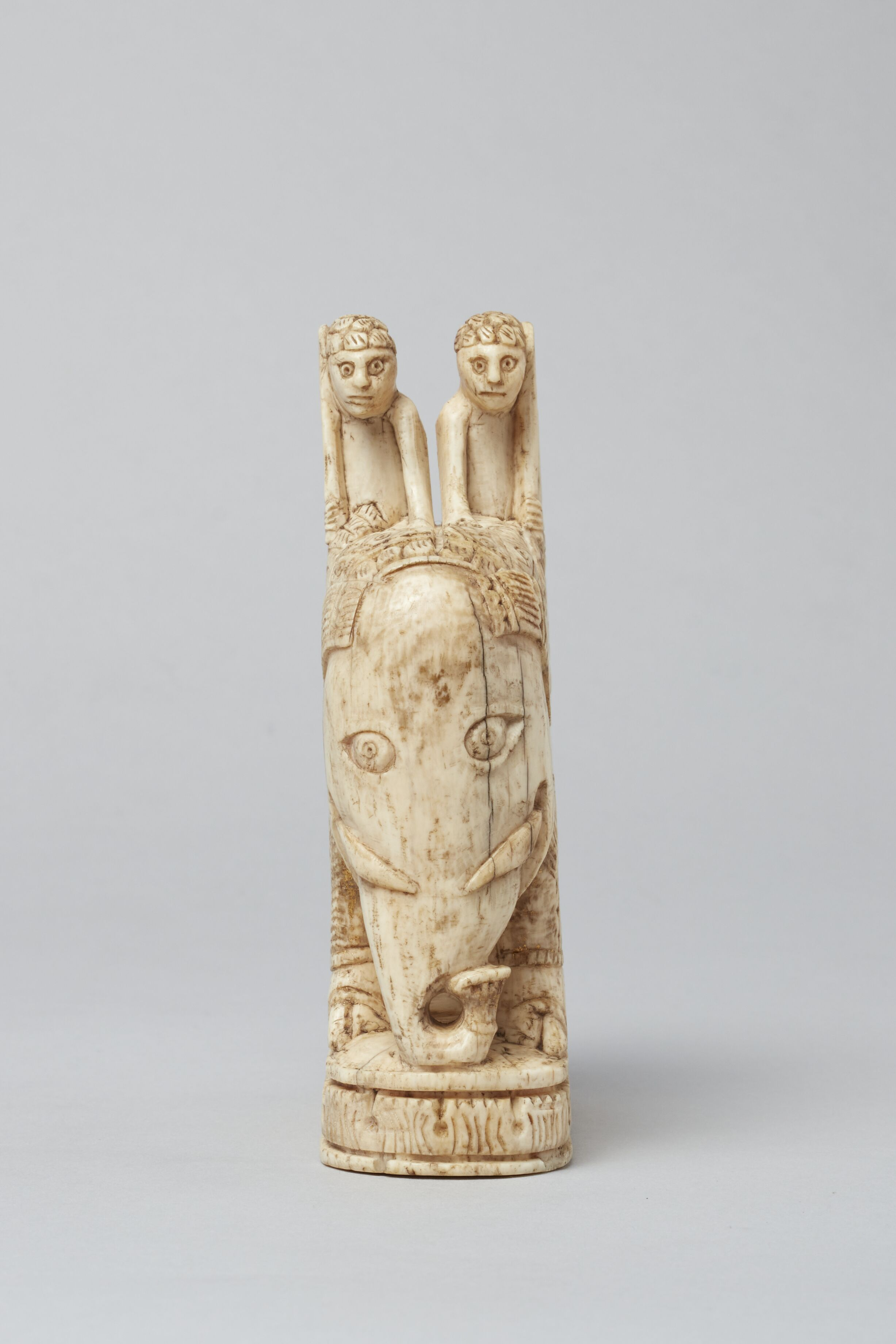
Skip image slideshow Elephant (btv1b100600907)

=== Pawn ===
Skip image slideshow
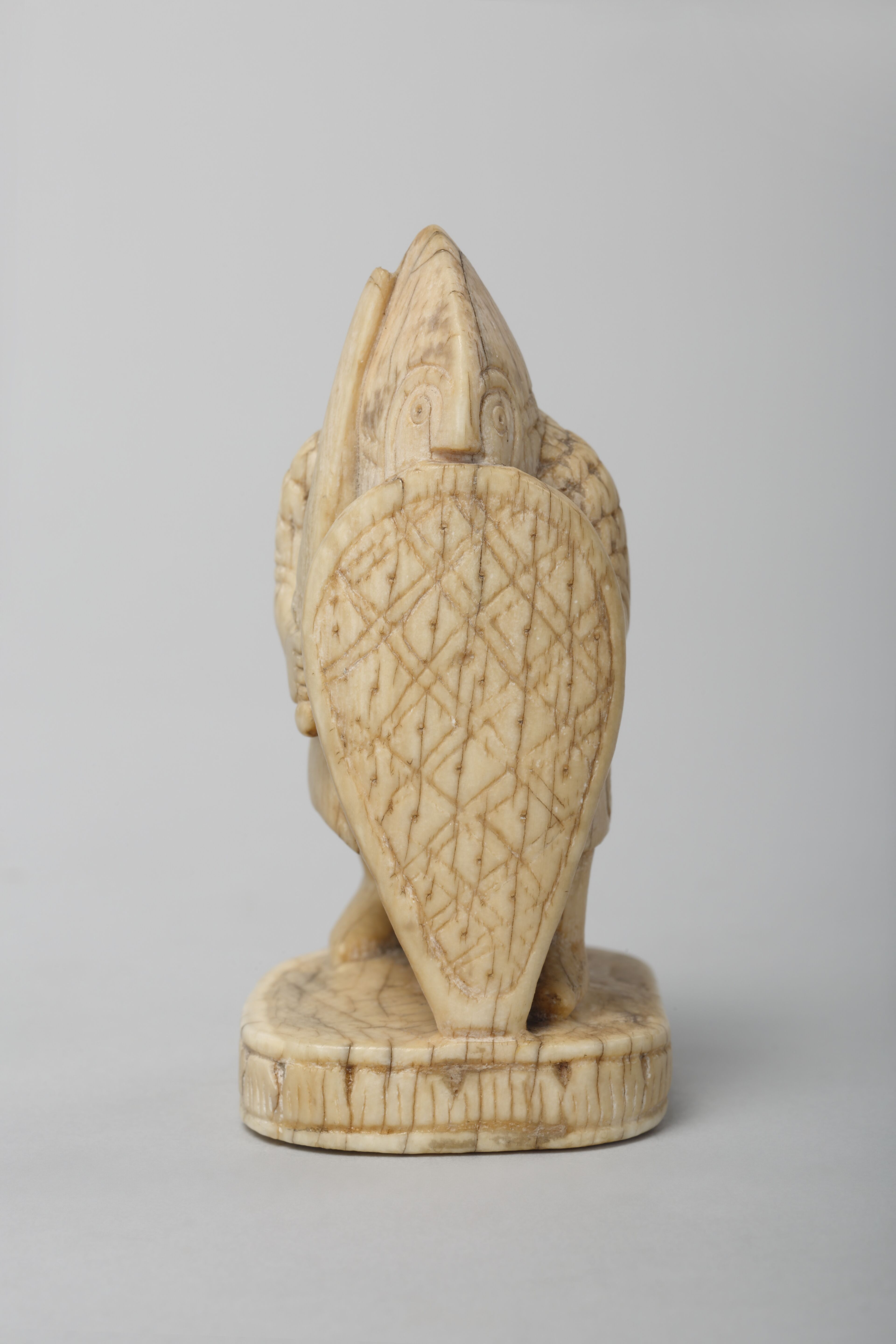
Pawn (btv1b55009944n)

== See also ==
- History of chess
