= Sahban Wa'il =

Arabic literary figure and orator

Sahban ibn Zafar ibn Iyas ibn Wa'il
- سُحْبَان بن زفر بن إياس بن وائل
- Died: 54 AH / 674 CE
- Occupations: Orator; Khatib (preacher / public speaker)
- Era: Late Jahiliyyah / Early Islamic period
- Known for: Extraordinary eloquence; model of Arabic oratory
- Title: Al-Khatib (the Orator)
- Parent: Zafar ibn Iyas ibn Wa'il (ancestral lineage)

Sahban ibn Zafar ibn Iyas ibn Wa'il (سحبان بن زفر بن إياس بن وائل) (died; 674) was an Arabic literary figure and an exceptional orator. He is sometimes mentioned as a standard of expressive skill in the combination of eloquence and literary style.

== Life and historical context ==
He belonged to the Bahila tribe (a branch of the Arab tribal confederations). The surname "Wa'il" is used as the name of a tribal ancestor (his "great-grandfather" in the genealogical tradition).

He is considered one of the Mukh'zaramin - that is, he lived during the Jahiliyyah (age of ignorance) and later converted to Islam, although sources indicate that he did not meet the Prophet Muhammad. And is said to have traveled (or been present) in the Levant (Syria) during the reign of Muawiyah ibn Abi Sufyan.

== Reputation and works ==
Sahaban Wa'il is known in the later Arabic literary tradition as an exceptional orator. In classical sources, he is sometimes claimed to have never repeated a word, even when speaking for extended periods, and to have adapted similar meanings to new expressions.

== Death ==
Wa'il is said to have died in 54 AH (≈ 674 CE) during the Umayyad Caliphate.

=== Legacy and influence ===
Sahaban Wa'il is often cited as a model of eloquence in Arabic rhetoric and literary discourse, especially in his alleged ability to reformulate similar ideas in fresh expression. In later Arabic literature, his name appears in works commenting on style and oratory, sometimes alongside other famous orators.

In Arabic conversation and idioms, it is often used against others: for example, in contrast to Baqil (a proverb of foolishness), one can say: "This is the age in which Baqil prevails and Sahaban wa'il declines," meaning that eloquence favors foolishness.
