= Salm ibn Qutayba al-Bahili =

Arab governor and military commander of Caliphate

Umayyad Governor of Basra
- In office 745 – September/October 749
- Monarch: Marwan II
- Deputy: of Yazid ibn Umar ibn Hubayra

Abbasid Governor of Rayy
- In office 750s–763
- Monarch: Al-Mansur

Abbasid Governor of Basra
- In office 763–763/4
- Monarch: Al-Mansur
- Succeeded by: Muhammad ibn Sulayman

Personal details
- Died: 766
- Relations: Bahila (tribe)
- Children: Amr; Muthanna; Sa'id; Ibrahim; Kathir
- Parent: Qutayba ibn Muslim (father)

Military service
- Allegiance: Umayyad Caliphate, Abbasid Caliphate
- Years of service: 740s – 766
- Rank: Commander

Abu Abd Allah Salm ibn Qutayba ibn Muslim al-Bahili was an 8th-century Arab who served as governor and military commander for both the Umayyad and Abbasid caliphates.

Salm was the son of the distinguished Bahila general Qutayba ibn Muslim, who as governor of Khurasan conquered Transoxiana for the Umayyad Caliphate.

According to al-Tabari, when Yusuf ibn Umar became governor of Iraq in 738, he considered making Salm governor of Khurasan, but Caliph Hisham ibn Abd al-Malik rejected his choice, and Nasr ibn Sayyar was appointed instead. During the civil war, he served as governor of Basra under Yazid ibn Umar ibn Hubayra. In September/October 749, as the forces of the Abbasid Revolution entered Iraq, the Abbasid commander al-Hasan ibn Qahtaba appointed Sufyan ibn Mu'awiya ibn Yazid ibn al-Muhallab as governor over Basra and sent him to take over the city. Salm, aided by the troops of the Qays and Mudar at his disposal, confronted the advance guard under Sufyan's son Mu'awiyah, who was killed. Sufyan then abandoned his march on Basra. Salm retained control of the city until he received news of Yazid ibn Umar's death, whereupon he abandoned it.

After the establishment of the Abbasid Caliphate in 750, Salm served under Caliph al-Mansur as governor of Rayy and Basra. During the Alid revolt of 762–763 he served as governor of Rayy, and was asked by al-Mansur to come to assist in suppressing the uprising. In 763, he was appointed governor of Basra, keeping his post until his replacement by Muhammad ibn Sulayman ibn Ali during the next year (146 AH, 763/4 CE). He died in 766.

His sons, Amr, Muthanna, Sa'id, Ibrahim, and Kathir, and their offspring, continued to occupy several high offices as governors and military commanders in the early Abbasid regime.

== Sources ==
- Blankinship, Khalid Yahya, ed. (1989). The History of al-Ṭabarī, Volume XXV: The End of Expansion: The Caliphate of Hishām, A.D. 724–738/A.H. 105–120. SUNY Series in Near Eastern Studies. Albany, New York: State University of New York Press. ISBN 978-0-88706-569-9.
- Bosworth, C. E. (1986). "Ḳutayba b. Muslim". In Bosworth, C. E.; van Donzel, E.; Lewis, B. & Pellat, Ch. (eds.). The Encyclopaedia of Islam, Second Edition. Volume V: Khe–Mahi. Leiden: E. J. Brill. pp. 541–542. ISBN 978-90-04-07819-2.
- Crone, Patricia (1980). Slaves on Horses: The Evolution of the Islamic Polity (1980 ed.). Cambridge: Cambridge University Press. ISBN 978-0521229616.
- Kennedy, Hugh, ed. (1990). The History of al-Ṭabarī, Volume XXIX: Al-Mansūr and al-Mahdī, A.D. 763–786/A.H. 146–169. SUNY Series in Near Eastern Studies. Albany, New York: State University of New York Press. ISBN 978-0-7914-0142-2.
- McAuliffe, Jane Dammen, ed. (1995). The History of al-Ṭabarī, Volume XXVIII: The ʿAbbāsid Authority Affirmed: The Early Years of al-Mansūr, A.D. 753–763/A.H. 136–145. SUNY Series in Near Eastern Studies. Albany, New York: State University of New York Press. ISBN 978-0-7914-1895-6.
- Williams, John Alden, ed. (1985). The History of al-Ṭabarī, Volume XXVII: The ʿAbbāsid Revolution, A.D. 743–750/A.H. 126–132. SUNY Series in Near Eastern Studies. Albany, New York: State University of New York Press. ISBN 978-0-87395-884-4.
