= Bahila =

Bahila باهلة
- Adnanites
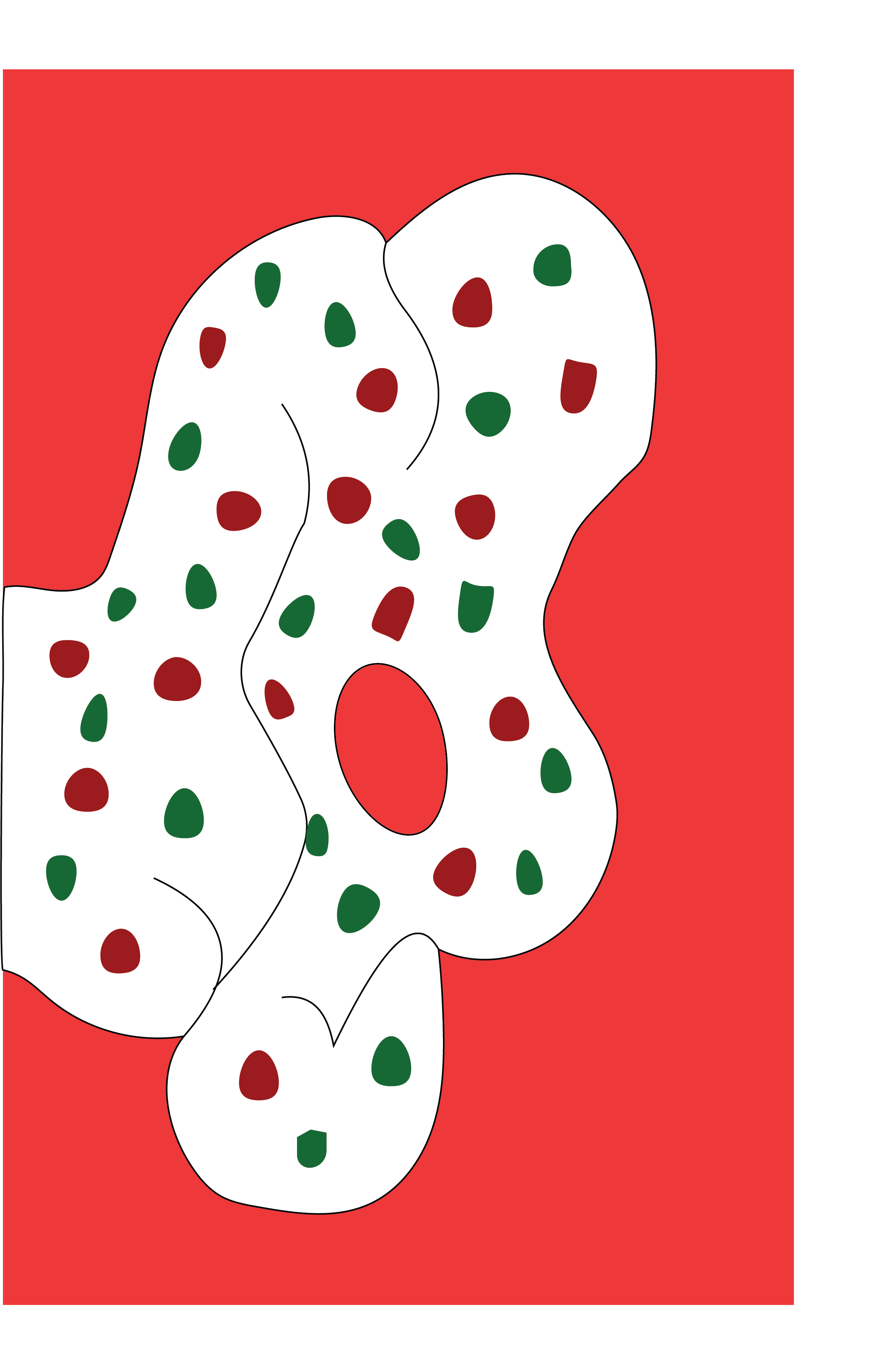
- Banner of the Bahila at the Battle of Siffin
- Ethnicity: Arab
- Nisba: Al-Bahili
- Location: Before 7th century: Arabian Peninsula; After 7th century: Syria; Iraq; Khorasan
- Descended from: Bahila, wife of Malik ibn A'sur
- Religion: Paganism, later Islam

Bāhila (Arabic: باهلة) was an Arab tribe based in Najd (central Arabia). Part of the tribe was settled and part of it was semi-nomadic. The Bahila was first mentioned during the early years of Islam, in the mid-7th century. During that time, many Bahila tribesmen migrated to Syria and Basra. Many of those who went to Syria later moved to Khurasan as part of the Umayyad garrison there. As a sub-tribe of Qays, they fought alongside the Qaysi coalition against the Yamani tribes during the Umayyad era. The scholar al-Asma'i and the general Qutayba ibn Muslim both belonged to the tribe. The Bahila were last mentioned in the 10th century.

== Genealogy ==
According to W. Caskel, the genealogy of the Bahila "is somewhat complicated". The namesake of the tribe, Bahila, was a wife of Malik ibn A'sur ibn Sa'd ibn Qays, and after the latter's death, was married to Malik's brother Ma'n. Bahila mothered one son from Malik and two sons from Ma'n, and was also the foster mother of ten other sons of Ma'n (the foster sons came from two other mothers). Caskel describes this genealogy as a series of "artifices", which were familiar to the Arab genealogists, though the "accumulation" of such artifices with the origins of the Bahila was "remarkable". Among the sons of Bahila who later fathered large clans were Qutayba, Wa'il, Ji'awa and Awd. The Qutayba and Wa'il were the largest sub-tribes of the Bahila and both were engaged in a rivalry for supremacy over the Bahila.

== History ==
Map of Bata'ih region (in orange) of the lower Euphrates

The Bahila's original homeland was called Sūd Bāhila or Sawād Bāhila. It was situated in the Najd (central Arabia). The tribe's settlements, including al-Quway', Idhnayn Shammal, Hufayra and Juzayla, were located on either side of the route between Mecca and the area corresponding with modern-day Riyadh. The Ji'awa clan of Bahila lived further west at the foot of the al-Jidd mountains. They were the northern neighbors of the Banu Ghani, another tribe that descended from A'sur ibn Sa'd ibn Qays. The Bahila were partly settled and partly semi-nomadic. They lived under the protection of the Banu Kilab and Banu Ka'b, sub-tribes of the Banu 'Amir. There is scant reference to the Bahila in the pre-Islamic period. Among these references were the slaying of a warrior from the tribe named al-Muntashir, and a battle involving the tribe. Both episodes occurred shortly before the emergence of Islam in Arabia in the 610s.

According to Caskel, "The history of the [Bahila] tribe becomes clear for the first time under Islam." In the 630s, part of the Bahila migrated from Arabia to Syria and to the vicinity of Basra. They formed part of the early Muslim army, and Bahila tribesmen from Syria were part of the Arab garrison in Khurasan. As members of the Qays, the Bahila took part in the revenge-driven battles between the Qays and Yaman coalitions in the years following the rout of the Qays at the Battle of Marj Rahit in 684. A second major exodus of Bahila tribesmen from Arabia occurred in the early to mid-9th century. Around that time, the Bahila's Arabian territories were largely overrun by the Banu Numayr, a sub-tribe of the Banu 'Amir. The Bahila migrants entered the lower Euphrates region, first in the vicinity of al-Hufayr near Basra and from there into the sandy al-Taff tract on the southern border of the Bata'ih marshes. After 837, these Bahila tribesmen settled in the Bata'ih itself, where in 871 they were attacked by Abbasid troops on their way to suppress the Zanj Rebellion. Consequently, the Bahila allied with the Zanj. Afterward nothing is heard of the Bahila.

== Members ==
Caskel writes that the "Bahila developed an abundance of talents of all kinds". A companion of the Islamic prophet Muhammad, Abu Umamah, hailed from the tribe. Two brothers from the tribe, Salman ibn Rabi'ah and Abd al-Rahman ibn Rabi'ah, both served as generals under caliphs Abu Bakr and Umar in the 630s–640s. In the early 8th century, a member of the Bahila, Qutayba ibn Muslim, was appointed the Umayyad governor of Khurasan and was a key general in the Muslim conquest of Transoxiana. The tribe also produced al-Asma'i, the well-known philologist.

Yusuf al-Bahili was the sculptor or owner of the so-called Elephant of Charlemagne chess piece.

=== others ===
- Abd al-Rahman ibn Rabi'a
- Abu Umamah al-Bahili
- Al-Asmaʿi
- Hatim ibn al-Nu'man
- Hawthara ibn Suhayl
- Ibrahim ibn Salm al-Bahili
- Qutayba ibn Muslim
- Salman ibn Rabi'a
- Sa'id ibn Salm al-Bahili
- Sahban Wa'il
- Salm ibn Qutayba al-Bahili

== Bibliography ==
- Caskel, W. (1960). "Bahila". In Gibb, H. A. R.; Kramers, J. H.; Lévi-Provençal, E.; Schacht, J.; Lewis, B. & Pellat, Ch. (eds.). The Encyclopaedia of Islam, Second Edition. Volume I: A–B. Leiden: E. J. Brill. OCLC 495469456.
- Dunlop, D. M. (1960). "Al-Bahili, Abd ar-Rahman b. Rabi'a". In Gibb, H. A. R.; Kramers, J. H.; Lévi-Provençal, E.; Schacht, J.; Lewis, B. & Pellat, Ch. (eds.). The Encyclopaedia of Islam, Second Edition. Volume I: A–B. Leiden: E. J. Brill. OCLC 495469456.
- Flood, Finbarr Barry (2011). "Conflict and Cosmopolitanism in 'Arab' Sind". In Rebecca M. Brown; Deborah S. A. Hutton (eds.). A Companion to Asian Art and Architectur (PDF). Blackwell. pp. 365–397.
- Ibn 'Abd Rabbih (2011). Boullata, Emeritus Issa J. (ed.). The Unique Necklace, Volume III. Reading: Garnet Publishing Limited & Southern Court. pp. 294–295.
