= Yusuf al-Barm =

Yusuf al-Barm was a rebel leader against the Abbasid Caliphate in Khurasan in the 770s.

Few details are known of his origin: his father was called Ibrahim, and according to Ya'qubi he was a mawla of the Banu Thaqif tribe in Bukhara. Yusuf's own religious beliefs are left unmentioned; likewise the meaning of the sobriquet "al-Barm" is unknown.

Yusuf's uprising was one of a series of revolts in Khurasan during the early Abbasid period, such as the roughly contemporaneous rebellion of al-Muqanna. The revolt's motivations are somewhat obscure. Medieval sources give religious grounds, including the traditional call to "command good and forbid wrong", but they are contradictory: some call him a Kharijite, while others accuse him of unbelief (kafir) and of claiming to be a prophet. According to C. E. Bosworth, "it appears that the revolt was basically political and directed against the arbitrary power of the caliph and his governors". It is unknown when exactly the revolt broke out, except that it was during the governorship in Khurasan of Humayd ibn Qahtaba, which began in 768. It spread across southern Khurasan (what is now northern Afghanistan), namely the regions of Badhghis, Marw al-Rudh, Juzjan, and Talaqan.

He spurred offers of a pardon (aman) from Caliph al-Mahdi (r. 775–785), but was finally defeated and captured in 776/7 by either Yazid ibn Mazyad or Sa'id ibn Salm. Yusuf was brought to Baghdad, where he was executed through crucifixion by Harthama ibn A'yan, who had lost a brother to Yusuf's rebellion.

A grandson of Yusuf, Mansur ibn Abdallah, led an unsuccessful revolt in Khurasan during the caliphate of al-Ma'mun (r. 813–833). He was defeated and killed. Another grandson, Yusuf ibn Mansur, is attested along with a son of Yusuf, al-Husayn, during the Abbasid civil war of 865–866.

== Sources ==
- Bosworth, C. E. (2002). "Yūsuf al-Barm". In Bearman, P. J.; Bianquis, Th.; Bosworth, C. E.; van Donzel, E. & Heinrichs, W. P. (eds.). The Encyclopaedia of Islam, Second Edition. Volume XI: W–Z. Leiden: E. J. Brill. p. 358. doi:10.1163/1573-3912_islam_SIM_8045. ISBN 978-90-04-12756-2.
- Crone, Patricia (2012). The Nativist Prophets of Early Islamic Iran: Rural Revolt and Local Zoroastrianism. Cambridge and New York: Cambridge University Press. ISBN 978-1-107-01879-2.
