= Avinoam Shalem =

Israeli academic (born 1959)

- אבינועם שלם
- Born: 1959 (age 66–67); Haifa, Israel
- Known for: Medieval Islamic, Jewish, and Christian art studies
- Title: Riggio Professor of the History of the Arts of Islam
- Awards: Getty Foundation grant

Academic background
- Education: University of Tel Aviv, LMU Munich, University of Edinburgh

Academic work
- Institutions: Columbia University
- Notable works: Black Mediterranean project

Avinoam Shalem (Hebrew: אבינועם שלם; born 1959) is the Riggio Professor of the History of the Arts of Islam at Columbia University. He served as director of the American Academy in Rome from 2020 to 2021.

== Biography ==
Shalem was born in Haifa, Israel in 1959. He received his B.A. from the University of Tel Aviv, M.A. from LMU Munich before obtaining a PhD from the University of Edinburgh in 1995. He worked for the Khalili Collections and taught at LMU Munich prior to joining faculty at Columbia University in 2013. He was also a visiting professor at Villa I Tatti, and guest professor at Clark Art Institute and Jawaharlal Nehru University. Shalem's research focuses on medieval Islamic, as well as Jewish and Christian art.

In 2020, he was appointed 24th Director of the American Academy in Rome, where he was a 2016 resident. He stepped down in fall 2021 and returned to his teaching career at Columbia.

In 2022, Shalem received a grant from the Getty Foundation to direct the Black Mediterranean project, which reconsiders the history of the relationship between Africa and Europe by shedding light on African influences on Mediterranean cultures.
