= Qutayba ibn Muslim =

Umayyad Caliphate Arab commander and governor (669-715/6)

Qutayba ibn Muslim al-Bahili

Governor of Khorasan
- In office 705–715
- Leader: Al-Walid I

Personal details
- Born: 669 Basra, Umayyad Caliphate (present-day Iraq)
- Died: 715/6 (aged 45 to 47) Ferghana
- Relations: Abd al-Rahman, Abdallah, Amr, Salih (brother); Muslim ibn Abd al-Rahman ibn Muslim (nephew)
- Children: Salm, Qatan

Military service
- Years of service: Before 700 – 715
- Rank: Commander
- Battles/wars: Muslim conquest of Khorasan; Battle of Balkh (705); Muslim conquest of Transoxiana; Conquest of Paikand (706); Battle of Bukhara (709); Battle of Samarkand (712)
- Allegiance: Umayyad Caliphate

Abū Ḥafṣ Qutayba ibn Abī Ṣāliḥ Muslim ibn ʿAmr al-Bāhilī (Arabic: أبو حفص قتيبة بن أبي صالح مسلم بن عمرو الباهلي; 669–715/6) was an Arab commander of the Umayyad Caliphate who became governor of Khurasan and distinguished himself in the conquest of Transoxiana during the reign of al-Walid I (705–715). A capable soldier and administrator, he consolidated Muslim rule in the area and expanded the Caliphate's border to include most of Transoxiana. From 705 to c. 710, he consolidated Muslim control over the native principalities of Tokharistan and conquered the principality of Bukhara, while in 710–712 he conquered Khwarizm and completed the conquest of Sogdiana with the capture of Samarkand. The latter opened the road to the Jaxartes valley, and during the last years of his life Qutayba led annual campaigns there, extending Muslim control up to the Fergana Valley and parts of Chinese Turkestan.

To increase his strained manpower, Qutayba initiated the wide-scale levy of native Khurasani and Transoxianian soldiers who fought alongside the Arab Muslim troops. Following Walid's death, Qutayba, insecure of his position under the new regime, rebelled but failed to secure the support of his army, and was killed. Most of his conquests in Transoxiana were lost in the years after his death; only in the 740s was the Muslim position restored to the line reached by Qutayba, and only after the Battle of Talas in 751 did the region come solidly under Muslim control.

== Origin and early life ==
Qutayba was born in 669 CE in Basra, to an influential family of the Bahila tribe. His father, Muslim ibn ʿAmr, had enjoyed the favour of the Umayyads, but fought for their enemy Mus'ab ibn al-Zubayr at the Battle of Maskin during the close of the Second Muslim Civil War. He was killed in the fighting, but while he lay wounded he obtained assurances of safety for Qutayba from Caliph Abd al-Malik ibn Marwan. Qutayba rose at first as the protege of Anbasa ibn Sa'id, but was noticed by the powerful governor of Iraq and the East, al-Hajjaj ibn Yusuf, during the suppression of the revolt of Abd al-Rahman ibn Muhammad ibn al-Ash'ath in 700/701. Under al-Hajjaj's patronage, he took Rayy from the rebel Umar ibn Abi'l-Salt in 701, and became the city's governor.

Then, in late 704 or early 705, Abd al-Malik appointed Qutayba as governor of Khurasan in succession to al-Mufaddal ibn al-Muhallab. The choice of Qutayba, who hailed from the relatively weak Bahila tribe, was intended by al-Hajjaj to heal the destructive feud between the South Arab or "Yemeni" (Azd and Rabi'ah) and North Arab (Qaysi) tribal confederations in Khurasan by providing a governor who did not belong to either. The Bahila were neutral between the two groups, but generally allied themselves to the Qays, thus furthering al-Hajjaj's policy of emasculating Azdi power, which had been dominant in Khurasan during the governorship of al-Mufaddal's brother, Yazid ibn al-Muhallab. Furthermore, as Qutayba lacked a strong tribal base of his own, he could be expected to remain firmly attached to his patron.

Qutaybah mentioned his father, his tribe, and his homeland, praising himself in one of his speeches to the people of Khorasan, and reminding them that he was Iraqi in lineage and inclination, as he said, "Trace my lineage and you will find me Iraqi on my mother's side, Iraqi on my father's side, Iraqi by birth, Iraqi in my inclination, opinion, and religion.

Qutayba would spend the next ten years of his life in Central Asia, consolidating and expanding Muslim rule there. In this endeavour, both his military and diplomatic and organisational abilities came him in good stead; most importantly, he was able to enlist the support of the local Iranian population and the powerful dihqan (the Iranian "gentry") class.

== Conquests in Central Asia ==
Map of Khurasan, Transoxiana and Tokharistan

The Arabs had reached Central Asia in the decade after their decisive victory in the Battle of Nihavend in 642, when they completed their conquest of the former Sassanid Empire by seizing Sistan and Khurasan. The first Arab attacks across the Oxus ranged as far as Shash (Tashkent) and Khwarizm, but they were little more than raids aiming at seizing booty and extracting tribute, and were interrupted by the intertribal warfare that broke out in Khurasan during the Second Fitna (683–692). Subsequent governors, most notably Sa'id ibn Uthman and al-Muhallab ibn Abi Sufra, made attempts to conquer territory across the river, but they failed. The native princes, for their part, tried to exploit the Arabs' rivalries, and with the aid of the Arab renegade Musa ibn Abd Allah ibn Khazim, who in 689 seized the fortress of Tirmidh for his own domain, they managed to eject the Arabs from their holdings. Nevertheless, the Transoxianian princes remained riven by their own feuds, and failed to unite in the face of the Arab conquest, a fact which would be suitably exploited by Qutayba after 705. The international situation was also favourable to Qutayba. Tang China was weakened, and the Second Turkic Khaganate (682–744) was embroiled in warfare with the Türgesh Khaganate (699–766).

=== Conquest of Tokharistan and Bukhara ===
The first task which Qutayba set himself was the suppression of the rebellion in Lower Tokharistan. This was accomplished swiftly in spring 705, with the reconquest of Balkh. One version of events holds that the city surrendered peacefully, but another suggests it was violently captured, which seems likely as the city is mentioned as ruined a few years later. Qutayba then secured the submission of the local princes in the upper Oxus valley, most notably of Tish, king of al-Saghaniyan, who invited Qutayba to aid him in his dispute with the ruler of nearby Akharun (or Akhrun) and Shuman, in the northern mountainous districts of Tokharistan. After extensive negotiations led by Sulaym the Persian, the tarkhan Nizak, ruler of the Hephthalite principality of Badghis, surrendered to Qutayba, and pledged to accompany him in his expeditions.

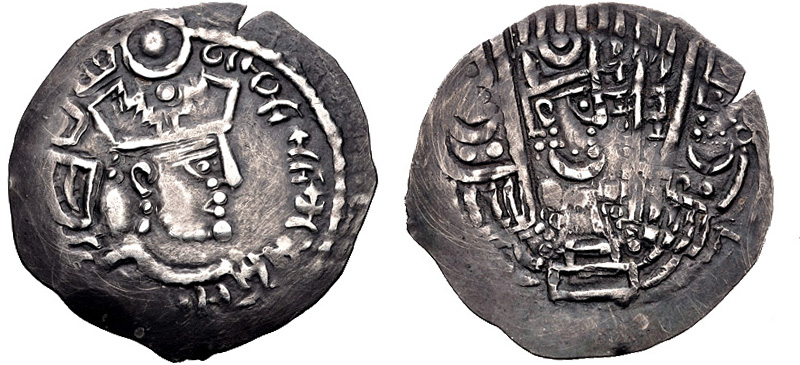
Coin of Khunuk Khudah, ruler of Bukhara

In 706–709, Qutayba occupied himself with the long and bloody conquest of Bukhara. Bukhara was at the time weakened by civil war: royal power had been weakened in favour of ambitious nobles during the minority of King Tughshada. The ruler of nearby Wardana, the Wardan Khudah, had seized most of Tughshada's territories, including Bukhara itself, while the remainder was ruled by another local magnate, Khunuk Khudah, who had usurped the title of king of Bukhara (Bukhar Khudah). Taking advantage of the conflict, Qutayba was able to easily capture the city of Baykand after a two-month siege. He left a small garrison there and departed, but the inhabitants launched a revolt soon after. The Arab army then turned back and proceeded to sack the city. The men of fighting age were executed, the women and children sold off as slaves, and enormous booty amassed, especially in armour and weapons, which equipped the Arab army. The high quality of the Sogdian craftmanship became proverbial as the "forging of Sughd" in Arabic accounts.

The brutal punishment meted out to Baykand shocked the region: the Sogdians patched up their quarrels and the Sogdian princes of Kish and Nasaf united behind the Wardan Khudah. Bahili accounts extolling Qutayba's achievements mention the participation of 200,000 Türgesh troops as well, but this is evidently an exaggerated anachronism. In the campaign of 707, Qutayba was able to capture two outlying towns, Tumuskath and Ramithana, before he was threatened in his rear by the united Sogdian army. Qutayba avoided a battle, and engaged in negotiations to gain time, before executing a rapid retreat to safety through the Iron Gate to beyond the Oxus, crossing the river at Tirmidh. The campaign of 708 was also a failure against the united Sogdian forces, which drew the ire of al-Hajjaj. For 709, al-Hajjaj drew up a new plan for his subordinate: the Arabs launched a direct attack on Bukhara, which caught the Sogdian alliance—possibly weakened by the death of its leader, the Wardan Khudah—by surprise. The city was taken by storm, a tribute of 200,000 dirhams imposed, and an Arab garrison installed. In its direct aftermath, Tarkhun, the ruler of Samarkand, sent envoys to Qutayba and became a tributary vassal to the Caliphate.

=== Consolidation of Arab rule over Tokharistan ===
This success was followed however by the rebellion in the autumn of 709 of much of Lower Tokharistan under Nizak of Badhgis. Leaving Qutayba's camp on a pretext of going to Balkh and escaping to his native lands, Nizak quickly managed to gain the support of the principalities of Talaqan and Faryab, and the city of Balkh. In an effort to raise the entire region in revolt, Nizak also forced the nominal suzerain of Tokharistan, the Yabghu, to join the uprising. The year was too advanced for a direct confrontation and the Muslim levy-based army mostly disbanded, but Qutayba ordered his brother Abd al-Rahman to take the garrison of Merv, some 12,000 men, and head to Balkh to secure the Muslim position there. This move proved effective in discouraging the rebellion of more local princes, and in spring 710, Abd al-Rahman was able to re-establish Muslim control over Tokharistan almost without bloodshed. Most of the rebel rulers fled or capitulated, and finally, Nizak was captured with the assistance of some native princes and executed on al-Hajjaj's orders, despite promises of pardon. The Yabghu was exiled to Damascus and kept there as a hostage (possibly with the ruler of Chaghaniyan acting as regent in his stead). Lower Tokharistan was more firmly incorporated into the Caliphate, as Arab district representatives were appointed alongside the local princes, who were gradually relegated to secondary positions. Qutayba's brother Abd al-Rahman was installed with a garrison near Balkh to oversee the affairs of the province. From this point on, Balkh began developing "as a centre of Arab power and Islamic culture", in the words of C. E. Bosworth; within a generation, it was Islamicized to the extent of briefly replacing Marw as the provincial capital of Khurasan.

Despite the swift end of Nizak's revolt, the diversion of Arab resources for its suppression encouraged the king of Shuman and Akharun decided to rebel as well. Qutayba led his forces against him, and captured his citadel after a brief and violent siege. The king fell in battle, and his supporters were executed. Qutayba then marched west over the Iron Gate, taking Kish and Nasaf and visiting Bukhara, where he settled relations between the Arabs and the locals, installed Tughshada in the position of Bukhar Khudah and established an Arab military colony in the city. Later, in 712/13, Qutayba built a mosque in the city's citadel, but although the Arab authorities encouraged the conversion of the native population by paying them to attend prayers, Islamization proceeded slowly.

At the same time, Qutayba had adopted a measure that marked a radical departure from previous practice in the East and had long-term repercussions: the raising of native Khurasani auxiliary levies, usually some ten to twenty thousand strong and mostly composed of non-converts, to supplement the Arab tribal army, the muqatila. This measure was later expanded to include the newly conquered territories in Sogdia and Khwarizm. Gibb suggests that this move may be seen as an answer to the need for more troops to control the conquered territories and continue Muslim expansion, as well as a means of placing the local manpower in Arab service and depleting it at the same time, reducing the risk of anti-Arab revolts. Gibb also suggests that the creation of an indigenous force may have been an attempt by Qutayba to establish a power base of his own. From c. 712, Qutayba also appears to have recruited a special corps, known as the "Archers", from among the Khurasani, Tokharian and Sogdian nobility. Their skill was such that they were known as rumāt al-buduq ("archers who pierce the pupils of the eyes"), and they apparently served as a bodyguard. Among the local Khurasani converts, Hayyan al-Nabati emerged as the foremost leader, and appears frequently in Tabari's account both as the main military leader of the Khurasani conscripts and as chief negotiator with the Sogdians, for example during the 709 treaty with Tarkhun.

=== Campaign against the Zunbil ===
Later in 711, al-Hajjaj ordered Qutayba to march against the Hephthalite kingdom of Zabulistan, whose rulers, referred to by their title, Zunbil, had long remained an indomitable thorn in the Arabs' side and menaced their province of Sistan. Repeated expeditions against the Zunbil had failed, and a truce had been agreed in exchange for tribute. In addition, the existence of a free Zabulite kingdom was a threat to the security of Muslim control over the Hephthalite principalities of Tokharistan, who might be encouraged to seek support from it. Thus Qutayba led a large army south, but the Zunbil readily offered his submission and the payment of tribute. Satisfied with this easy success, and unwilling to hazard a campaign in the mountains of Zabulistan, Qutayba departed. No garrisons were installed, and after the Arab army departed, the Zunbil ceased the payment of tribute.

Qutayba's victories, parallel with the conquests of Muhammad ibn al-Qasim in northwestern India, awoke such enthusiasm and hopes among the Muslims that al-Hajjaj is reputed to have offered the governorship of China to whoever of the two first reached it.

=== Conquest of Khwarizm and the expeditions in the Jaxartes valley ===
Taking advantage of Qutayba's absence in the south, the inhabitants of Samarkand overthrew their ruler Tarkhun due to his passive stance towards the Arabs, and installed the prince Ghurak in his stead. As Qutayba prepared to march against Samarkand during the winter of 711/712, he received envoys from the king of Khwarizm (the Khwarizmshah).

Khwarizm had been previously subdued in the mid-690s by Umayya ibn Abdallah, but as soon as his forces departed, the Khwarizmshah had renounced the treaty, and subsequent efforts by Yazid ibn al-Muhallab against Khwarizm had failed. The Khwarizmshah, whose name is given as Jigan or Chigan by Bal'ami, faced a rebellion by his younger brother Khurrazadh and a powerful rival, the king of Khamjird, and asked Qutayba for help, offering recognition of the Caliphate's suzerainty, money, livestock and the payment of tribute in exchange. Qutayba, after announcing that he would head for Sogdia, advanced with his troops in a lightning campaign to the Khwarizmian capital Hazarasp. His brother Abd al-Rahman defeated and killed Khamjird's troops in battle and took 4,000 prisoners, who were then executed. Khurrazadh and his followers were also captured and executed. The Khwarizmians however rebelled shortly after Qutayba's departure and killed the Khwarizmshah. Qutayba replaced the governor, Iyas ibn Abdallah ibn Amr, with his own brother Abdallah ibn Muslim, but the revolt persisted until, after the capture of Samarkand, a strong force under al-Mughir ibn Abdallah could be sent to subdue the region. The local Afrighid dynasty was left in place, with Askajamuk II, the son of Azkajwar II, as the new Khwarizmshah, but the conquest of Khwarizm was accompanied by great brutality: the 11th-century Khwarizmian scholar al-Biruni compares the events with a barbarian sack, as the Arabs proceeded to massacre most of the upper classes who had fomented the revolt, and destroyed a great many objects of Khwarizmian culture, including manuscripts.

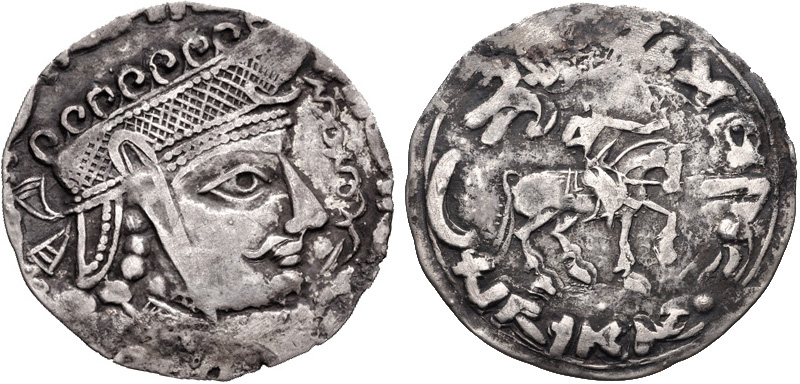
Coin of the 8th-century Khwarizmshah Sawashfan

After leaving Khwarizm, Qutayba initially turned towards Merv, for his army had grown weary and demanded an end to the campaign. During the march, however, Qutayba suddenly turned the army around towards Samarkand. The Sogdians had disbanded most of their forces, and the Arabs, reinforced with levies from Bukhara and Khwarizm, were able to brush aside the local resistance and advance straight to the city itself and lay siege to it. Ghurak and the inhabitants of the city resisted the Arabs with determination, and called upon the rulers of Shash and the Ferghana Valley for aid. The ruler of Shash indeed sent a strong army to aid them, but it was ambushed and destroyed by the Arabs. The news of this arrived at the time where the Arab siege weapons had effected a breach in the city walls, forcing Ghurak to sue for peace. Qutayba initially granted surprisingly lenient terms: the payment of an annual tribute and the provision of an auxiliary corps as with Bukhara and Khwarizm, as well as the construction of a mosque inside the city and the celebration of prayers there by the Arab army. Once inside the city however, Qutayba proceeded to occupy and garrison it. One of his brothers (accounts differ between Abd al-Rahman and Abdallah) was left as governor, and orders were given prohibiting any non-Muslim access to the city citadel. Ghurak and his retinue left the city and founded a new town, Farankath, further to the north. This treachery enabled Qutayba to bring most of Transoxiana under his (albeit tentative) control, but it also considerably tarnished his prestige among the Sogdians.

Arab sources indicate that at about his time, the Sogdian princes called upon the Turkic Khaganate or the Türgesh for help against the Arabs, although the chronology and veracity of these accounts is open to question. At any rate, over the next two years Qutayba engaged in an effort to push the Caliphate's borders further and gain control of the Jaxartes valley. A large force, supported by some 20,000 Transoxianian levies, marched into the valley in early 713. The native levies were dispatched against Shash, which was reportedly taken, while Qutayba with the Arabs marched in the direction of Khujand and Ferghana. Little is known of these expeditions, although successful battles are recorded before Khujand and at Minak in Ushrusana, and the dispatch of an Arab embassy to the Chinese court is verified by Chinese sources.

In 714, Qutayba renewed his expeditions along the Jaxartes, probably with Shash as his base, but his campaign was cut short upon receiving the news of the death of al-Hajjaj. Unsure of his position now that his patron was gone, he disbanded the army and returned to Merv.

=== Battle of Kashgar ===
Qutayba is reported to have advanced as far as Kashgar, where he captured the city and fought the Chinese forces, took spoils and captives, and pushed deep into Chinese territory. the Tang emperor sent letter requesting to negotiate with Qutayba. Qutayba sent a Muslim delegation to negotiate with the emperor, resulting in an agreement between the Arabs and the Chinese under which the Muslims would withdraw from the city in exchange for tribute and valuable gifts from the Tang court. but this report is dismissed by some modern historians. Mahmoud Mohammed Khalaf, professor of history in the Islamic University of Minnesota, replied to the dismissal claims and presented it as a rebuttal to the view of the historians who dismissed the claim of the battle, specifically to the Orientalist Gibb:

Thus it becomes clear that the Muslim conquests had in fact reached the city of Kashgar – one of the cities of China at that time. This stands as the strongest rebuttal to the claim of the orientalist Gibb, who alleged that the Muslim armies never reached the city, while the Hungarian orientalist Ármin Vámbéry affirmed that Muslim forces had reached East Turkestan and attacked the rulers of the Uyghurs. He further stated that the city of Canton was the easternmost frontier of Islam.

Historian Christopher I. Beckwith argues that there is no reason to reject the historicity of the raid on Kashgar. He references Ibn A'tham al-Kufi's account of Qutayba sending 7,000 troops under Kathir's command to raid Kashgar, where they inflicted casualties and took 100 captives.

=== Rebellion and death ===
Caliph Walid quickly re-confirmed Qutayba as governor, and even made his province independent from the governor of Iraq, but Qutayba's position was not secure: the Arab army was tired of constant campaigning and was still riven by factional rivalries, while Qutayba himself had alienated the most powerful Arab tribal groups. He was generally popular among the native Iranians, but the leader of the native auxiliaries, Hayyan an-Nabati, had secretly turned against him. Qutayba was completely unaware of the situation however, and began preparations for the campaign of 715, during which he intended to finally capture the Ferghana Valley and complete the subjugation of the Jaxartes valley. His only concern was that his old rival, Yazid ibn al-Muhallab, might be restored to the Caliph's favour after al-Hajjaj's death, and he took few precautions except for removing his family and belongings from Merv to Shash and placing a guard on the Oxus.

His campaign against Ferghana was under way when news reached the army of Caliph Walid's death and the accession of his brother Sulayman ibn Abd al-Malik to the throne. The new Caliph was a bitter enemy of Qutayba, for the latter had argued in favour of excluding him from the succession. Although Sulayman re-confirmed him in his position as governor, Qutayba feared that he would soon be removed. At the last, after negotiations with the new regime in Damascus failed, Qutayba resolved to rebel. The Khurasani Arabs refused to support him, and the native auxiliaries, although favourably disposed towards him, were prevented from declaring their support by Hayyan al-Nabati. Only his family, his fellow Bahili tribesmen and his bodyguard, the Archers, remained faithful. The opposition, led by the Tamim tribe, coalesced around their leader Waki ibn Abi Sud al-Tamimi. In August 715 (according to al-Tabari) or early 716 (according to the 9th-century historian Ibn Qutaybah), Qutayba and other members of his family were killed at Ferghana by Arab soldiers. Waki ibn Abi Sud succeeded him as governor, and ordered the army to return to Merv, where it was disbanded.

After Qutayba's death, the Arab position in Transoxiana swiftly crumbled. His successors did not command his prestige among the local population and were unable to maintain his conquests in the face of local revolts and invasion by the Türgesh, and most of Transoxiana was abandoned or became hotly contested territory in the years after his death. During this period, the Arabs suffered the grave defeats of the "Day of Thirst" and the Battle of the Pass and were weakened by internal conflicts as well. Only after 738, under Nasr ibn Sayyar, were the Umayyads able to restore the Caliphate's control over most of Transoxiana, and only with the decisive victory of the new Abbasid Caliphate against the Chinese armies at the Battle of Talas in 751 did the local princes accept Muslim control as final. In the south too, the Zunbil of Zanbulistan ceased his payment of tribute to the Caliphate and remained resolutely independent for decades after.

Qutayba's role in the conquest and gradual Islamization of Central Asia was crucial, and in later times, a number of locations in Ferghana where his tomb was supposedly located (Narshakhi and Jamal Qarsh) were venerated by pilgrims. His descendants too continued to hold influential positions: his son Qatan served as governor of Bukhara, Salm, another son, governed Basra and Rayy, and his nephew Muslim was governor of Balkh. His grandsons, especially the numerous sons of Salm, continued in high office under the Abbasids until well into the ninth century.

== Notes ==
a: According to the historian al-Tabari, the regular Muslim forces in the region mustered 47,000 Arabs (9,000 from Basra, 7,000 Bakr, 10,000 Tamim, 4,000 Qays, 10,000 Azd and 7,000 Kufans) and 7,000 mawali or native converts.
b: The Orientalist Wilhelm Barthold, however, rejected al-Biruni's tale of a deliberate eradication of Khwarizmian culture due to the lack of mention of these events in any previous source, and quotes al-Biruni's first modern editor, Eduard Sachau, who considered this passage as an evocation of the burning of Persepolis by Alexander the Great.

== Sources ==
- Barthold, W. (1928). Turkestan Down to the Mongol Invasion (Second ed.). London: Luzac & Co. OCLC 4523164.
- Blankinship, Khalid Yahya (1994). The End of the Jihâd State: The Reign of Hishām ibn ʻAbd al-Malik and the Collapse of the Umayyads. Albany, New York: State University of New York Press. ISBN 978-0-7914-1827-7.
- Bosworth, C. E. (1986). "Ḳutayba b. Muslim". In Bosworth, C. E.; van Donzel, E.; Lewis, B. & Pellat, Ch. (eds.). The Encyclopaedia of Islam, Second Edition. Volume V: Khe–Mahi. Leiden: E. J. Brill. pp. 541–542. ISBN 978-90-04-07819-2.
- Crone, Patricia (1980). Slaves on Horses: The Evolution of the Islamic Polity (1980 ed.). Cambridge: Cambridge University Press. ISBN 978-0521229616.
- Fishbein, Michael, ed. (1990). The History of al-Ṭabarī, Volume XXI: The Victory of the Marwānids, A.D. 685–693/A.H. 66–73. SUNY Series in Near Eastern Studies. Albany, New York: State University of New York Press. ISBN 978-0-7914-0221-4.
- Gibb, H. A. R. (1923). The Arab Conquests in Central Asia. London: The Royal Asiatic Society.
- Kennedy, Hugh (2007). The Great Arab Conquests: How the Spread of Islam Changed the World We Live In. Philadelphia, Pennsylvania: Da Capo Press. ISBN 978-0-306-81740-3.
- Litvinsky, B. A.; Zhang, Guang-da; Samghabadi, R. Shabani, eds. (1996). History of Civilizations of Central Asia, Volume III: The Crossroads of Civilizations, A.D. 250 to 750. Paris: UNESCO Publishing. ISBN 92-3-103211-9.
  - Bulgakov, P. G. "Khwarizm, Part Two: Al-Biruni on Khwarizm". In Litvinsky, Zhang & Samghabadi (1996), pp. 222–231.
  - Jalilov, A. H. "The Arab Conquest, Part Two: The Arab Conquest of Transoxiana". In Litvinsky, Zhang & Samghabadi (1996), pp. 456–465.
  - Litvinsky, B. A. "The Arab Conquest, Part One: The Arab Conquest of Iran". In Litvinsky, Zhang & Samghabadi (1996), pp. 449–456.
- Shaban, M. A. (1970). The ʿAbbāsid Revolution. Cambridge: Cambridge University Press. ISBN 0-521-29534-3.
- Wellhausen, Julius (1927). The Arab Kingdom and Its Fall. Translated by Margaret Graham Weir. Calcutta: University of Calcutta.
- Khalaf, Mahmoud Mohammed (2014). بلاد ما وراء النهر في العصر العباسي (۱۳۲ - ٢٦١هـ / ٧٥٠ - ٨٧٢م) [Transoxiana in the Abbasid era (132-261 AH / 750-872 AD)] (in Arabic). General Egyptian Book Organization. ISBN 9789774489341.
