= Paykend =

Archaeological site in Uzbekistan

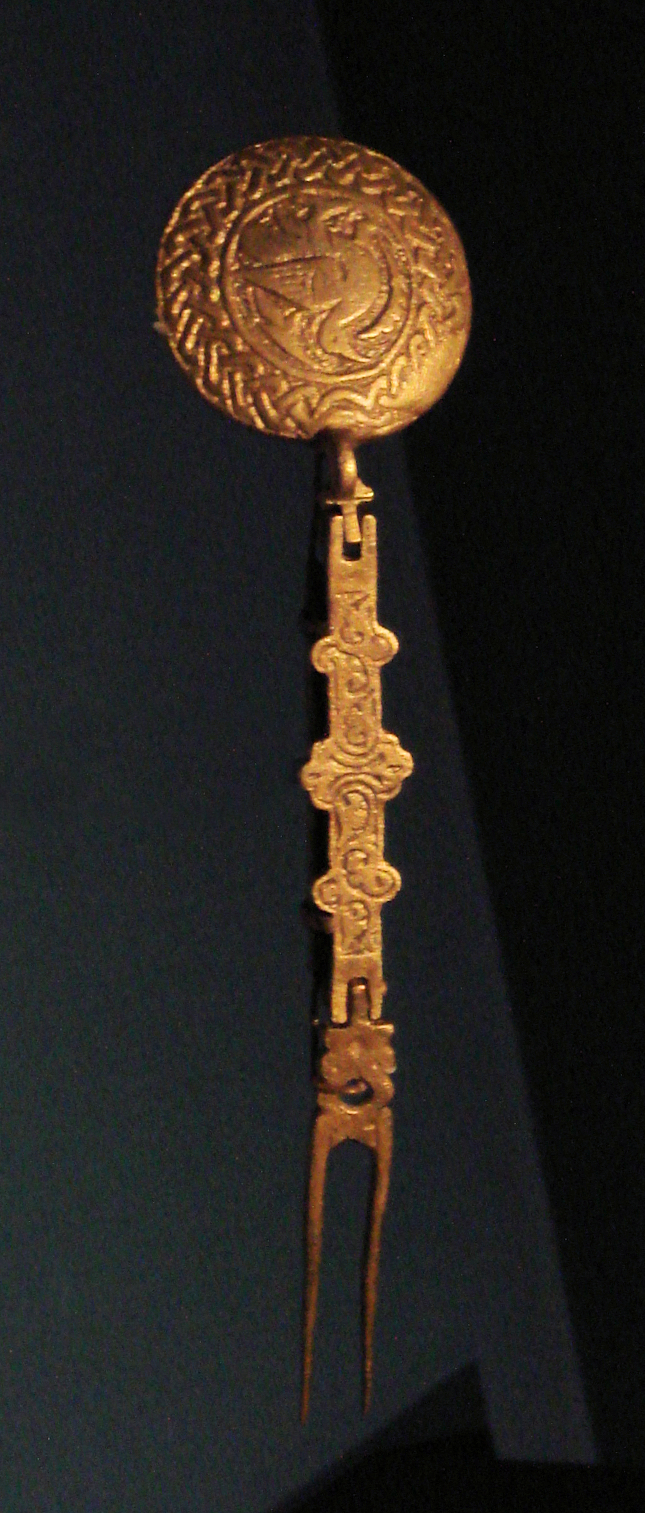
Decorated fork, 7-8th century CE, Paykend.

Paykend or Poykent (Uzbek: Poykend) and also Baikand, is an ancient city in Uzbekistan. The city consisted of a citadel, two settlements, and a rabod (suburb). Paykend is currently under consideration for inscription as a UNESCO World Heritage site.

== History ==
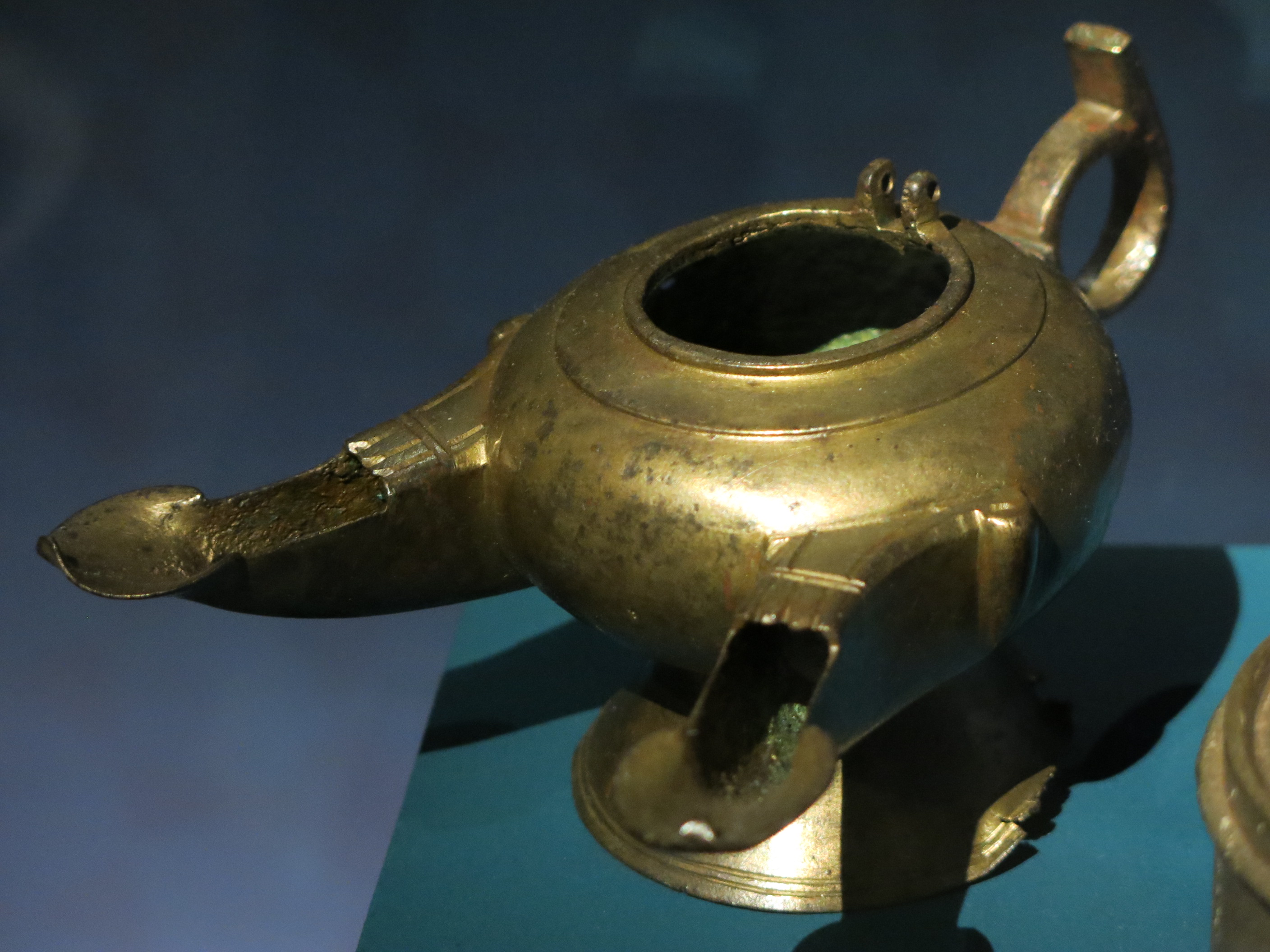
Lamp with double beak, 11-12th century. Paykend.

In the early eight century, the city was a great trade center and was protected by great mudbrick walls and an inner citadel. When the Arab conquests reached the region in the eight century, the population were forced to pay tribute. However, they rebelled in 706, according to some stories due to the Arab governor trying to take advantage of a local girl or possibly simply as the inhabitants did not want to pay tribute any more.

The Arab governor of Khurasan, Qutayba ibn Muslim, decided to set an example and besieged the city. He undermined the walls and though the miners died during the collapse of the wall, the city fell. In the aftermath, all fighting men were systematically killed and the women and children taken into captivity. The Arabs acquired an enormous quantity of booty, melting down many ancient artifacts of silver in order to pay the Muslim soldiers. The city never recovered from the sack and was soon overshadowed by the neighbouring city of Bukhara.

== Site description ==
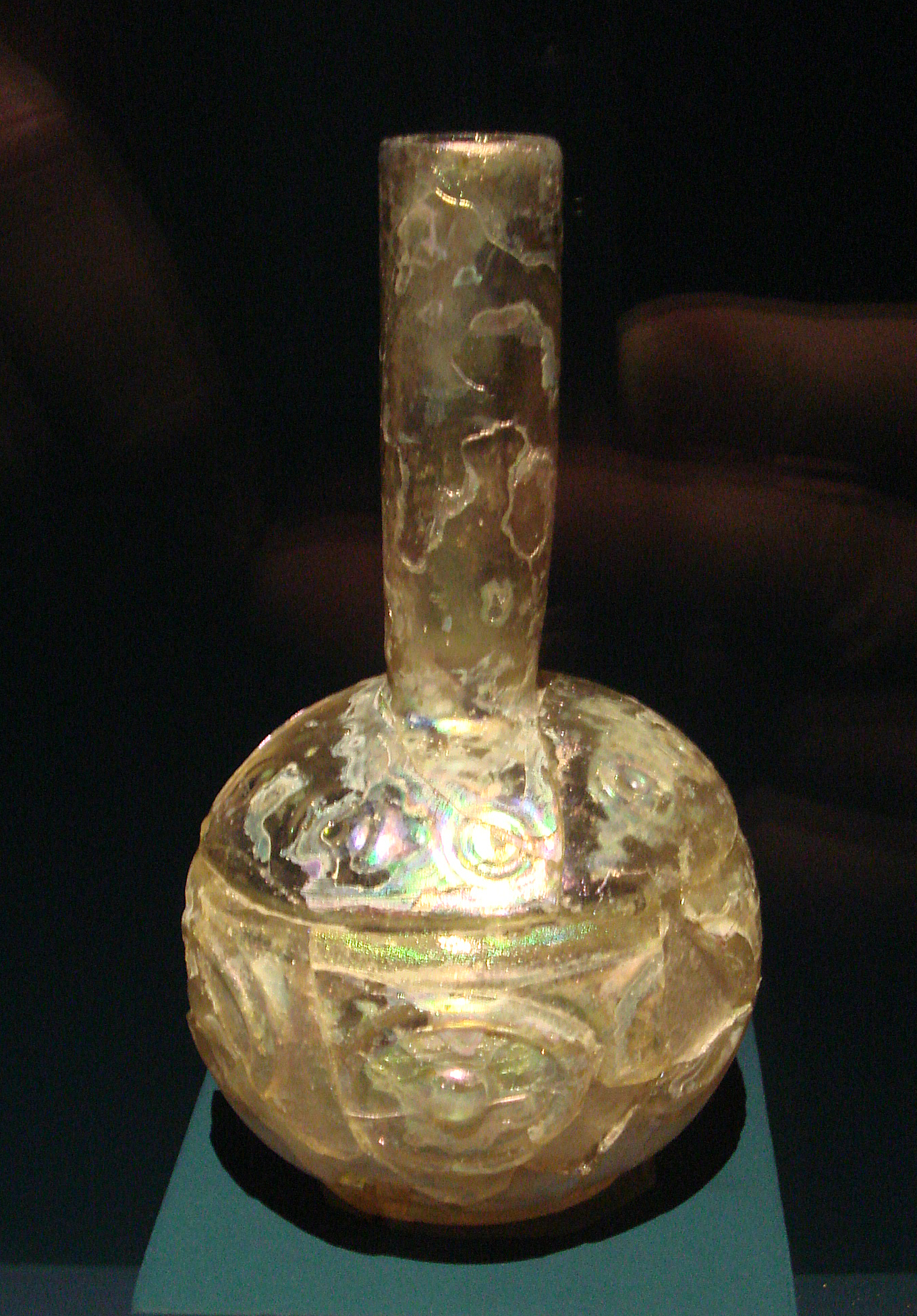
Glass bottle, Paykend, 10-12th century

== World Heritage Status ==
This site was added to the UNESCO World Heritage Tentative List on 18 January 2008, in the Cultural category. It was finally listed as a World Heritage Site in 2023 as part of the Silk Roads: Zarafshan-Karakum Corridor listing.

== Notes ==
2. https://journals.openedition.org/asiecentrale/pdf/1841

== Sources ==
- Kennedy, Hugh (2007). The Great Arab Conquests: How the Spread of Islam Changed the World We Live In. Da Capo Press. pp. 258–259. ISBN 978-0-306-81585-0.
