= A Jewish Princedom in Feudal France =

Book by Arthur J. Zuckerman

A Jewish Princedom in Feudal France, 768–900
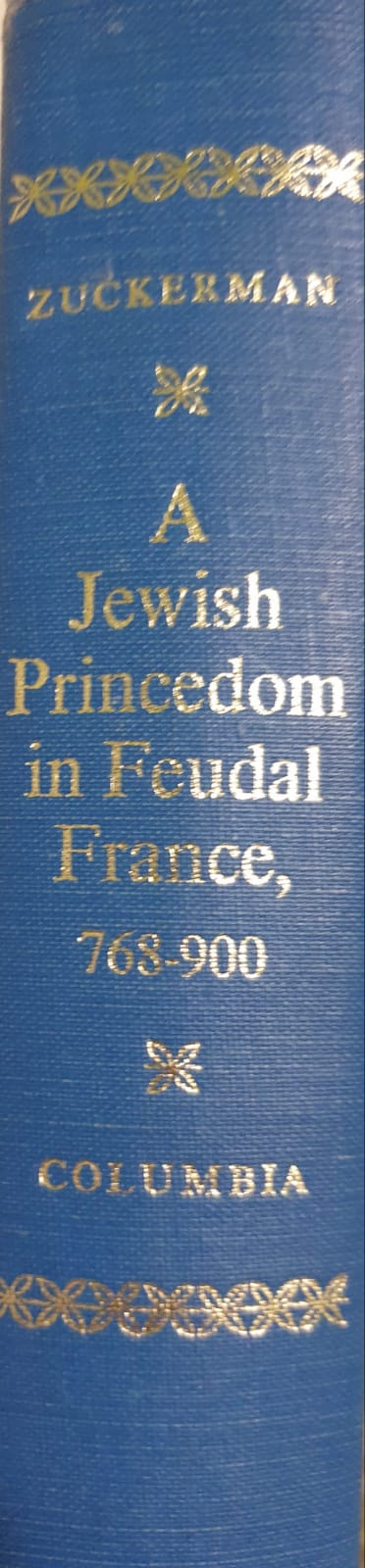
- Author: Arthur J. Zuckerman
- Language: English
- Series: Columbia University studies in Jewish history, culture, and institutions, no. 2
- Subject: Jewish history in Carolingian Empire
- Genre: academic research, medieval history
- Published: 1972
- Publisher: Columbia University Press
- Publication place: USA
- Pages: 490
- ISBN: 0-231-03298-6

A Jewish Princedom in Feudal France, 768–900 is a book about Frankish medieval history by Arthur J. Zuckerman (published 1972 by Columbia University Press).

According to Zuckerman's thesis presented in the book, a vassal Jewish princedom was established in Narbonne (Septimania) by the Carolingian king Pepin as a reward for Jewish cooperation in the Frankish conquest of the city in 759 CE from Muslim Al-Andalus. The dynasty of Jewish rulers was later also confirmed by Pepin's son Charlemagne and endowed with significant lands and privileges. He views later counts and dukes of Toulouse (Aquitaine) and Barcelona (Hispanic Marches) under the Carolingians as scions of these Jewish rulers. The first ruler was Makhir of Narbonne, a likely descendant of the Babylonian exilarch Bostanai, of the 7th century CE.

Zuckerman argues that the Princedom played an important role as a buffer zone in the border area between the Muslim caliphate south of the Pyrenees and the Christian Frankish Empire in the north. Its counts played influential roles in the imperial military campaigns in the Hispanic Marches, Aquitaine, and at the Carolingian court in Aachen.

Zuckerman's thesis has been contested by several scholars and criticized for its conjecture and lack of reliable evidence, particularly when identifying presumably Christian Carolingian nobles with Jewish members of the House of Exilarchs.

== Source analysis ==
=== Methodology ===
Zuckerman analyzed monastery records, Carolingian archives, Jewish medieval texts from Europe and Babylonia, Muslim sources, Chanson de geste (heroic songs) and other primary documents. This involved attempting to recover what he considered to be the original history from challenging sources like monastery records, some of which he views as manipulated, re-edited and even intentionally forged in later centuries to legalise the confiscation of Jewish property, as well as from fictional sources like Chanson de geste, which represented the contributions of many authors in multiple literary layers over several centuries around their original historical narrative. Zuckerman used a holistic, multicultural approach to sources originally in Hebrew, Aramaic, Latin, Greek and Arabic with attention to Jewish, Christian and Muslim practice and international political alliances in Europe, the Orient and North Africa in medieval times. His reexamination of the source material resulted in a novel interpretation of Septimanian history and engendered much scholarly debate.

=== Onomastic evidence ===
A key part of the analysis consisted of correlating Jewish naming conventions from different cultural backgrounds. It is well known that the exilarchs of Baghdad frequently had at least two names – a familiar Persian or Aramaic name and a formal Hebrew-biblical name. The geographical and cultural mobility of Jews in post-Exilic period led to such widespread practice of combining traditional Jewish names with kinnui'im (secular nicknames). Zuckerman argues that as result, a Jew who received a traditional Hebrew name at birth can have further Arabic or Aramaic name equivalents if he lives in that cultural area, only to add a Latin, Greek or Frank name if moving to Europe later on. Against this practice it is for example argued that Makhir of Narbonne, the most multicultural personality of the dynasty, had Hebrew, Aramaic and Frank names even combined with a further nickname based on Chanson de geste. A similar approach is applied if relevant for those who Zuckerman considers to be his later descendants.

== Makhiri dynasty, according to Zuckerman ==
=== The Carolingians and the Davidic line ===
The Carolingians were sensitive to accusations of the usurpation of the crown through conquest from the Merovingians. Succession to the biblical David would be a claim of divine sanction to rule as it would legitimise their royal power. It is documented that Charlemagne occasionally called himself by the name of David. However Charlemagne's own thinking of being the successor for biblical kings of the Jewish people required a governance over the Jews and at least nominal control over Jerusalem. Creating a vassal Jewish princedom, intermarrying with its Davidic line and building a strategic alliance with the Abbasid Caliphate in Baghdad who ruled over the land of Israel provided Charlemagne a symbolic hold in Jerusalem which fulfilled both preconditions. However, ideas such as these were in tension with the views of the Church and Pope Leo III and developed in later decades into fierce opposition and conflicts.

==== From Babylonia to Frankia – Makhir of Narbonne ====
Zuckerman names the exilarch family he views as ruling southern Francia the Makhiri Dynasty, named for its first ruler, Makhir of Narbonne (born in Babylonia, died 6. July, 793 in Pannonia). He sees references to the Hebrew name מכיר (Machir), the Aramaic name Natronai b. Habibai, the Arabic name Al-Makhiri, the Frankish name Theodoric, and the protagonist of the Chanson de geste called Aymeri de Narbonne, as all referring to the same man, a nasi from Baghdad who was appointed by Pepin the Short in 768 a count in the Princedom of the Jews in Septimania.

Makhir was a Babylonian exilarch and rabbinic scholar also known in Babylonia by his Aramaic name Natronai b. Habibai, a scion of the "pure Jewish line" of the exilarch Bostanai (and his wife Adoa). During the years of 763–766 CE his exilarch succession was challenged by Zakkai b. Ahunai, known also as Baboi, of the Persian line. As a result, "the exilarch Natronai went to the West" – or according to variant readings to Tsarfat (France) or Sfarad (Spain). Zuckerman suggests that from the standpoint of Baghdad, this would be consistent with Narbonne, which around these years transited from Spanish to French rule. The exilarch succession politics was interdependent with the upheaval in the Umayyad Caliphate and is paralleled with Pepin's three years diplomatic mission to Baghdad, which returned in 768 back to Marseilles and established coalition between the Carolingians and Caliph Al-Mansur against the rebellious Emirate of Córdoba. In the same year, Makhir was invited by the Carolingians to become the first nasi (exilarch) appointed as ruler in Narbonne. The year 768 was significant as it was the year the King Messiah ben Ephraim was expected according to some Jewish Kabbalistic interpretations, as it coincided with the end of seven hundred years of the Second Temple destruction.

===== Rise to power, life, sources =====
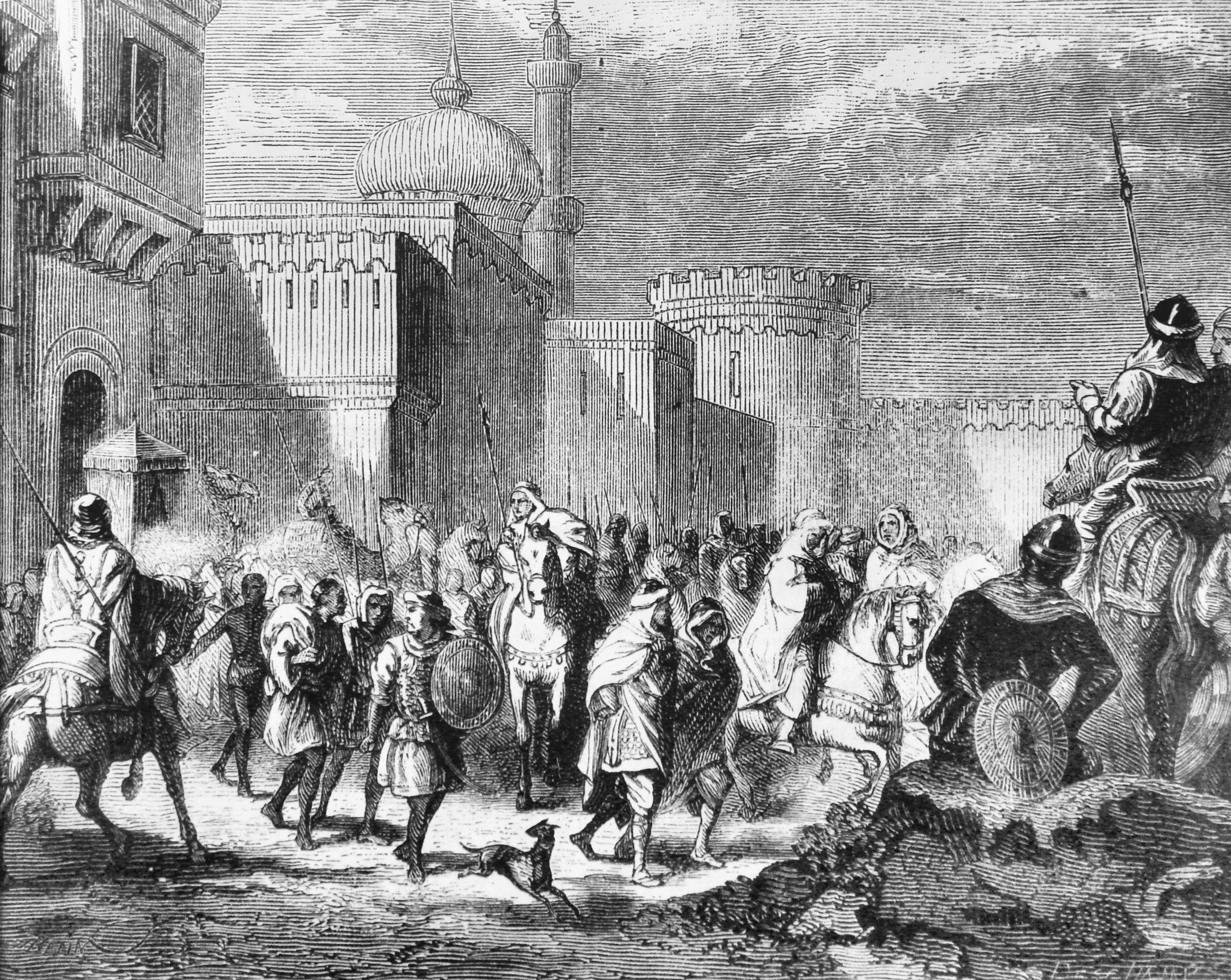
Umayyad troops leaving Narbonne to Pépin the Short, in 759. Painting of 1880

The Iberian Peninsula in 750 CE

For their cooperation in ending the seven-year-long siege of Narbonne in 759 CE, Pepin the Short promised the local Jews formal recognition and a prince (nasi) of their own.

This was implemented 9 years later in 768 when Makhir of the Davidic lineage was received from Baghdad by Pepin and his son Charlemagne. Zuckerman argues that he was accepted into the Frankish nobility under the name Theodoric, identifying him with the documented Frankish count of that name. Theodoric was granted by the Carolingian broad authority over Jews and Christians, extensive hereditary territories and "a great possession", including former church property lost decades before to the Umayyad Caliphate. Makhir became by an act of commendation a vassal of the Carolingian who in turn received overlordship of the Jews as evidence of entering legitimate biblical succession. Theoderic (alias Makhir, according to Zuckerman) received a Carolingian princess as his wife – apparently Alda, the daughter of Charles Martel and sister of Pepin. A Hebrew description of Makhir's installation was documented by Abraham ibn Daud, author of Sefer Seder HaQabbalah (Book of the Order of Tradition) – especially in the Addendum to Sefer HaQabbalah (composed before 1165, during the life of the then-young nasi Kalonymos b. Todros, a supposed descendant of Makhir). It refers consistently to Makhir and his descendants as a dynasty of nesi'im princes whose power and position in Narbonne were virtually identical with that of the exilarchs (k'mo rashe galuyot) in Babylonia. A fragment of a legal document from 791 that names Maghario Count of Narbonne is interpreted by Zuckerman as using a Romanized form of Makhir, making it the only non-Hebrew document specifically mentioning him.

As Zuckerman relates, this assignment of "a great possession" was immediately sharply protested by Pope Stephen III, to no avail, in a papal epistle dated 768 complaining bitterly about gift of money and cession of territory to the Narbonne Jewry. Zuckerman finds what he considers to be a corresponding claim of a great endowment in favor of a Jewish scion of royal lineage from Baghdad in the Gesta Karoli Magni ad Carcassonam et Narbonam. A Jewish principate in Septimania would have represented a significant theological challenge to the church during its whole existence and Zuckerman sees its aftertaste as still perceptible even in the 12th century after the Princedom lost most of its real power from the Carolingian era. In a caustic remark during a theological messianic dispute (before 1143) about Genesis 49:10. Peter the Venerable of Cluny demanded from the Jews to produce an example of a king of the House of Judah and rejects their claim of a Jewish King in Narbonne because he did not fulfill his theological expectation of ruling over the Holy Land: "As for me, I will not accept that king (as something worthy of ridicule) whom some of you claim to have in Narbonne, the city in Gaul, others in Rouen. I will not accept a Jew as a King of the Jews except one residing in and ruling the Kingdom of the Jews (namely, Palestine)". This document mentioning a Jewish king in Narbonne is older than any of the Hebrew sources or chanson de geste and is viewed as independent of all of them.

In 1829 Dumège reported the presence of a now-lost manuscript from archives the Abbey Lagrasse near Narbonne relating a similar narrative of a king of the Jews, descendant of the prophet Daniel (also descendant of Davidic line according to rabbinic tradition) who ruled in Narbonne during the reign of Charlemagne. This document also mentioned that in 791 the Jewish king send an embassy of ten Jews led by Isaac to Charlemagne, paying a large sum for him to grant them a permanent king of their own in Narbonne. This Charlemagne accepted and ceded to them the part of Narbonne where they settled.

Count Theodoric (identical to Makhir according to Zuckerman) participated successfully in multiple military campaigns to secure the southwestern border of the Frankish empire. The most important was conquering the Hispanic Marches on both sides of the Pyrenees in 791. In the same year Charlemagne's privilegium confirmed in an impressive council the Jewish exilarchate as a permanent institution regulating and defining the power status in Septimania and March of Spain, mainly half of Narbonne and half of the King's income in the County and beyond. Zuckerman sees the possessions of the Nasi of Narbonne and the holdings of the Jews are shown to remain largely intact until the eleventh century.

With the rebellious border area to Spain now pacified Charlemagne turned his attention to the east to war against the Pannonian Avars. A tremendous army was assembled and Theodoric was charged with the command of one third of it in a successful battle. However, in the spring of 793 Theodoric had to split his army and send a significant part of his forces to Charlemagne in Frisia where it was massacred by Saxons on the Weser. Detached from these forces Theodoric fell in battle on 6 July 793 in Pannonia. He was succeeded by his son William.

Zuckerman also identifies Makhir with a character from the later chansons de geste, Aymeri de Narbonne, a famous warrior and an ancestor of a line of heroes.

===== Family and children =====
Frankish Empire 481–843 CE

In Zuckerman's view, Makhir probably arrived to Narbonne already with his first wife and family, which might result in parallel lines of succession.

Makhir and an unnamed first wife had the following children:

- Nathan b. Makhir (Rabbi Domatus)
- Menachem b. Makhir.
- Yakir b. Makhir
- Nathan and Menachem (or their younger brother Yakir) wrote a family chronicle of the Makhiri dynasty which was probably one of the sources for Ma'ase HaMakhiri (Deed of the Makhiri) an 11th-century work. Eliezer ben Nathan refers to it as "Thus did I see in the Ma'ase HaMakhiri".

Zuckerman would add to these the son born to Count Theodoric by his wife Auda of France, viewed as a second wife of Makhir by Zuckerman:

- William of Gellone

==== International politics and conquest of Barcelona ====
The famous count William of Gellone is identified by Zuckerman as identical to an exilarch bearing the Hebrew name יצחק, Isaac (identified as Isaac the Jew) and claims that in the court circles he was sometimes called Naso, related to his Hebrew title nasi. In medieval epics he was known as William of the curved nose (Naso), sometimes used also as a derogatory nickname for his son Bernard. Zuckerman sees William as the son of Makhir of Narbonne and Alda, a daughter of Charles Martel.

===== Reign and life =====
In 790 the young William replaced the dismissed Chorso as commander and Duke of Toulouse. His magnificent physical strength was distinguishing and William probably joined his father Makhir-Theodoric in Charlemagne's campaigns in the East, which left the Septimania area unprotected and weakened by Makhirs dead. The new Emir Hisham I. took in 793 the opportunity, declared jihad against the Franks and attacked Girona and Narbonne areas and took large booty. William returned home from the eastern front too late to hold the invaders. As result, William had to start his father's reconquest of the Hispanic Marches all over.

William was involved at Charlemagne's court in Frankish foreign policy as an ambassador. His knowledge of Hebrew, Arabic and further languages was impressive. He was part of the Charlemagnes diplomatic mission to Harun ar-Rashid in Baghdad and Jerusalem 797–803 which secured for Charlemagne the Banner of Jerusalem, a symbolic transfer of the Holy City, for his coronation as emperor in 800 and political alliance for invasion to Spain. During the mission was William naturally referred by the Jewish participants by his Hebrew name Isaac. Isaac-William brought from his mission presents from Harun ar-Rashid to Charlemagne, including the famous Abul-Abbas.

After his return from Baghdad William led together with his sons Heribert and Bera the Frank forces at the siege and capture of Barcelona in November 803. Zuckerman rejects other dating of the siege and concludes that the chronicler who wrote the original report of the siege and fall of Barcelona, now found in Ermold Niger's Latin poem, clearly recorded the events according to the Jewish calendar – the siege was announced by King Louis for New Moon in September 803, but actually started only three days later after the conclusion of Rosh HaShana (Jewish New Year and new moon) and the subsequent Sabbath on Sunday 24 September 803, beginning of the Hebrew year 4564, continued only with low intensity over Sukkot (Feast of Tabernacles). Two months later on Saturday 18 October 803 Barcelona surrendered and opened its gates. However the Franks deliberately delayed the triumphant entry to the city till Sunday 19 October 803 to avoid desecration of "the Holly Sabbath", where unnecessary military activity is forbidden under Jewish law. The pious Duke William of Narbonne and Toulouse and his men conducted the whole military campaign with strict observance of Jewish Sabbath and holidays. King Louis joined the end of the siege and gave Bera command of the newly captured fortress enabling William to return home to Narbonne or Toulouse.

With William now at the height of his career and political influence a monastery legend lets him became a monk under the influence of Benedict of Aniane at a monastery of Gallone. The facts seem however quite the opposite, he never became a monk. It is William's influence at the courts of Charlemagne and his son Louis the Pious which led to interest in Judaism on the part of several courtiers, some of whom eventually converted to Judaism, resulting in the next generation in the most prominent and dramatic conversion to Judaism of Bodo, Deacon of Emperor Louis. All this was viewed by the church as negative Jewish influence in the court which needs to be banned. In fact it must be assumed that later court chronicles were carefully editing out evidence about the constructive role of the Makhiri dynasty and calling attention to Jews "only under circumstances which compromise their loyalty or depict them as enemies of Christianity".

The chansons on the other hand were less concerned about church censorship and picture William as hero protecting Christianity from Muslim attacks, mentioning some William's typical Jewish practices – feeding his animals first, washing hands carefully before eating and even, with a portion of irony, having the pope to grant him a lifelong permission to eat meat every day of the week or having as many wives as he wants (polygamy was outlawed for European Jews only in the 11th century).

As nasi William founded a library and academy of Jewish learning in Gellone – Bet-El (Casa Dei) which had also commercial and military functions, and where he probably spend the last years before his death around 823. After his death the abbots of the neighbouring Aniane monastery took control of it and it was converted into a monastery.

William was a person of remarkable achievement. His passing emboldened the archbishop Agobard of Lyon who became the protagonist for restoration of church property and limiting of Jewish influence at the court.

===== Family and children =====
William's son and successor Bernard of Septimania was probably the youngest son from his wife Guiburc (Witburg) whom the chansons designate consistently as of non-Christian origin "from beyond the sea".

William's second wife Cunegund and further children (Gerberga, Heribert and others) are mentioned in two documents related to the founding of Gellone dated to 14 and 15 December 804. These documents were forged in the 11th century during a property conflict between the monasteries of Gellone and Aniane. Some researchers believe further that Bernard of Septimania was intentionally removed from the later document to hide the fact that Bernard's son also named William was executed, his brother Heribert was blinded other brother Gothselm was decapitated, his sister Gerberga was drowned for witchcraft while their father Bernard was put to death by the order of Charles the Bald.

Bera, Count of Barcelona was probably also a son of William.

==== Rise and fall – Bernard of Septimania ====
Lands of Bernard of Septimania 835 CE

Bernard of Septimania (born about 805–806, died 844) was the son of William Count of Toulouse and Gellone and Guiburc and the grandson of Makhir-Theodoric. Like them, he was Duke of Septimania. Like his father, he was sometimes called at the court Naso as related to his Hebrew title nasi. Sometimes used by his opponents also as a derogatory nickname for his prominent nose.

===== Reign and life =====
Bernard was the most colourful son of William. He held significant power in his domain, the March of Spain. His life is well documented mainly because of being the chamberlain of Emperor Louis the Pious. He was considered at court second after the King and at the time of his death Septimania was known as "kingdom".

Zuckerman is, in general, well aligned with Bernard's widely accepted history, but he reconstructs several important elements that can be best understood against his background as nasi. As a protagonist of Empress Judith, protector of her son Charles and advocate of new court order he aroused fierce opposition. Bernard's court opponents Wala and bishop Agobard circulated rumours that Bernard and the young pretty queen Judith were guilty of adulterous relations. Walla also accused Bernard of casting a magic spell against the Emperor Louis.

In the midst of these developments took place a further dramatic incident; Bodo, Deacon of Emperor Louis converted to Judaism in 838. Bodo fled to Spain, changed his name to Eleazar, married a Jewish woman, engaged in literary debate with Albar of Cordova, which is also viewed as related to the Makhiri role in Frankia. Bodo-Eleazar eventually became a prominent member of the Talmudic academies in Babylonia.

Bernard's position in Frankish Jewry and growing political influence resulted in strong antagonism in church circles. The rebellion against Emperor Louis targeted also Bernard and limited his power. The death of Emperor Louis forced Bernard to maneuver between the Pepin's and Charles the Bald's parties. The intrigues alienated Charles, who executed Bernard for treason at Toulouse in 844.

The clergy became a big beneficiary of the execution as it now received multiple properties and land grants around Narbonne.

The execution of the nasi led the Carolingians to revise their policy regarding Jews as protectors of the southern coastal areas and considering their replacement. The execution of Bernard also strengthened the church party who now hoped for stronger anti-Jewish legislation. These efforts were led by bishop Hincmar and bishop Amolo, successor of Agobard and antagonist of Jews and culminated at church council of Meaux–Paris in 845–846 creating multiple anti-Jewish canons and laws focusing on limiting Jewish influence in the court, military, governance, commerce and forbidding conversion from Christians to Judaism and the management of church properties by Jews. During the 8th and 9th centuries, some Goths (Visigoths) whose ancestors adhered to Arianism in the past converted to Judaism in Septimania (later Gothia) and Hispanic Marches (called later also Gotholania, Catalonia). At that time the Christian Goths were called Gothi, but also Jews in the area were called Gothi as the term connoted a population inhabiting that geographical area and not necessarily an ethnic or religious community. This blurred the distinction between Jews and non-Jews in the documents during the reign of the Makhiri dynasty making it extremely difficult to identify Jews who are designated Gothi during that period.

Bernard's line died out with his execution in 844 and with the passing of his sons who left no known Jewish offspring.

===== Family and children =====
Bernard married Dhuoda at Aix-la-Chapelle on 25 June 824. According to some sources Dhuoda was sister of sister in law of Emperor Louis le Dembonnaire. They had two sons:

- William of Septimania (29 November 826 – 850) – to him the learned Dhuoda addressed her famous Manual, which is, at least in its present form, a pious Christian document. William was 18 at the time of his father's death. He continued his father's alliance with Pepin II. but before he could stabilise his power in the south he was executed in 850 at a young age after fleeing to Barcelona on the order of Charles the Bald.
- Marquis Bernard (22 March 841 at Uzes – 872) – Dhuoda mentioned in her Manual that before her new-born infant could be baptised, her husband ordered his son to be brought to him in Aquitaine (presumably for circumcision on the eight-day after birth). Surprisingly "Bishop" Elefant, who carried Bernard's order did not baptised the infant and even eight months later it is still reported unbaptised. Marquis Bernard was nine years old when his father died and he was the only surviving male member of the Makhir-William-Bernard clan.

Other family:

Bernard's brother Heribert was blinded, his other brother Gothselm was decapitated, his sister Gerberga "a religious" was drowned for witchcraft by Lothar.

=== The late generations – Salomon's branch of the family ===
==== Saving the continuity after disaster – Salomon Makhiri ====
After Bernard's older son William of Septimania died in 850, Zuckerman sees the successor to the exilarchy as Salomon Makhiri (died between 18 August 868 and April 870), whom he equates with not just one but two counts in the Midi and the regions south of the Pyrenees, rulers of the Hispanic Marches and Septimania in Frankish sources, Salomon, Count of Roussillon, and Bernard, Count of Auvergne. This Salomon-Bernard is said to have married to the daughter of William, Count of Toulouse (or his sister), and Zuckerman thinks he was probably not of direct Makhir lineage but he emerged as the leader of the dynasty after the disastrous deaths of the Bernards relatives. Salomon and his father are both mentioned in a medieval Targum (Aramaic Bible translation) as the ancestors of the text Punctuator. The correct reading of the father's name is disputed (suggested readings are: Anatom, Aghatos, Tobias, Menachem) but it is clear to Zuckerman that Salomon is member of the Makhiri clan or married into it, because two of his ancestors bore this family name. This text also implies that Salomon frustrated the efforts of Hincmar, archbishop of Reims ("... broke in pieces the horn of the scoffer..."). He is equated with a celebrated character in the Chansons, Bueve Cornebut – Bovo Horn Buster (in which Zuckerman sees the Hebrew biblical term keren in meaning of power, breaking power).

===== Reign and life =====
In Zuckerman's narrative, after Bernard's execution, the Jews who until then were highly efficient protectors of the Spanish frontier felt that King Charles the Bald had broken their pact. Simultaneously the military situation deteriorated under multiple Viking and Saracen attacks during 844–847. Salomon's political role became essential for Charles the Bald as Salomon, in line with the experience of his predecessors, engineered in 846–847 in Rheims a peace treaty with the Emir of Cordoba. The grateful king, in anticipation, reconsidered his attitude towards the Jewish community and to the frustration of the Bishops Hincmar and Amolo, rejected in 846 at Diet of Épernay their anti-Jewish pro-ecclesiastical program and returned to the old political arrangements. Such gesture of reconciliation by Salomon reunited the cooperation of the Jewish community with Charles the Bald, which eventually further isolated Bernard's older son, William, in his support for Pepin II against Charles.

It is suggested that Abbasids of Baghdad, the former allies of the Carolingians and the Makhir dynasty, helped in 852 to reconquer Barcelona. This strengthened once again the Jewry of the Hispanic Marches, Narbonne-Barcelona area (called Ispamia in Hebrew sources), which emerged as a well advanced cultural and political power in the area, leading to about 40 years of great prosperity. Paltoi Gaon of Pumbeditha (842–858) sent to these communities the entire Talmud with commentary at their request. This implies stability, growth in learning as well as material resources. Natronai Gaon of Sura (853–858/63) reports about Jewish immigration from Kairouan to the County of Barcelona and his halachic and spiritual guidance provided to them. Some letters between the Babylonian Sura and Ispamia are addressed to the "Sages of Barcelona" implying the existence of substantial community.

Salomon went in 863 on a diplomatic mission to Cordoba to ensure the continuation of peaceful relations with Frankia. The rise of Salomon as a very close confidant of Charles the Bald coincided with the decline of Archbishop Hincmar's power. During Salomon's rule was his area called in some sources as kingdom.

According to Zuckerman, Salomon lost his life at the hands of a young assassin Wilfred the Hairy between 18 August 868 and April 870 when Wilfred's clan started a rebellion in the Hispanic Marches, and was succeeded by his son Makhir from Auvergne.

==== Kingdom in the summit of expansion – Makhir of Auvergne ====
Makhir of Auvergne (died c. 886) is mentioned as the son of Salomon Makhiri in the same Targum source as his father. Zuckerman sees him as identical with the Frankish count Bernard Plantapilosa, conventionally son of Count Bernard of Septimania and Dhouda.

===== Reign and life =====
In June 864 Bernard replaced the rebelling Humphrey as Count of Autun – these lands were once held in trust by Emperor Louis to William, son of Bernard of Septimania. In 866 Count Bernard appears as lay abbot of St. Julien de Brioude in the Auvergne. Bernard also holds the title marquis and the ducal dignity. His office and extended possessions in Auvergne, Autun, Aquitaine and the Hispanic March made him a ranking personage of the Midi. He resided in Narbonne (mentioned in court judgement 870). During this period there are three people known as Bernard in south Frankia, resulting in confusion and disagreement among the historians over to which Bernard certain actions should be attributed.

The Treaty of Meerssen in 870 added Lotharingia to the kingdom of Charles the Bald. The ascension of Charles to the imperial office in 875 also increased the dignity and responsibility of Bernard. Following the inclusion of Lotharingia, according to Zuckerman Bernard-Makhir received as nasi the conditional pledge of homage of Lotharingian Jewry. This was conditional on abolishing the annual ritualistic public wounding of a Jewish leader in Toulouse by a church representative while paying a wax oblation. Zuckerman claims Bernard-Makhir brought charges against the ecclesiastical authorities, the Emperor ordered a court investigation and the decision went against the church authorities. However, it was re-instituted after the monarch died. The nasi continued complaining in the new less-favorable political situation and still achieved an improved royal decision in 883. Zuckerman sees archbishop Hincmar of Rheims as the leading spirit behind taxing Jews and restitution of former ecclesiastical properties, and his death in 882 as opening the way for a more favorable ruling in 883.

In 872 Bernard son of Bernard of Septimatia died in an ambush, which in Zuckerman's telling terminated that line of the Makhiri, In the same year Bernard Plantapilosa, equated with Makhir, received a royal appointment to the triumvirate of Aquitaine. He was responsible for the reconquest of Barcelona for the Franks in 876 or early 877, for which Zuckerman credits the efforts by the Jews who remained loyal to the Emperor, and this led to the reintegration of the Hispanic Marches under Frank control after the flight of Wilfred the Hairy and his associates.

The death of Carloman in 884 catapulted Bernard Plantapilosa to the summit of his power and prestige. In the South he achieved similar glory to his ancestors William of Toulouse and Theodoric of Narbonne, perhaps even surpassing them as he is reputed to have been a virtual king of his own domain: occasionally in the ninth century, Septimania is referred to as a "kingdom". Bernard next appears as chief warrior of the legitimate Carolingian dynasty and of Emperor Charles the Fat against the usurper Boso of Provence. Duke Bernard Plantapilosa lost his life in battle in 886, fighting for Charles the Fat. Bernard Plantapilosa married Ermengaude, having a son William and a daughter Adelinde.

==== Decline – Margrave William ====
Margrave William (died 6 July 918) secured confirmation of his late father's offices and estates by act of Emperor Charles the Fat in 886. He inherited significant territories in Francia's Midi; Toulouse, Auvergne, Septimania, Hispanic Marches and others. Some monastery editors are painting him at the time of his death as 'William the Pious'. Zuckerman found it unclear if Margrave William also continued his father's office as nasi, and suggested the possibility that this office now separated from the duke office. William was over time unable to retain the large inheritance, and Wilfred the Hairy took control of at least part of the Hispanic March, which territory Zuckerman sees as significant for the office of nasi. Zuckerman thinks it possible that Vita S. Austremonii refers to Margrave William as the Princeps Judaeorum – Prince of the Jews, becoming extremely angry after the Saint baptised his son Boso. The death of Emperor Charles the Fat in 886 brought anarchy to the French realm, and Zuckerman sees William's death on 6 July 918, without heirs, as marking the terminal point of his dynasty of Makhiri exilarchs in Narbonne. He was succeeded by a nephew, William the Young, who with his younger brother Acfred were the offspring of his the elder William's sister Adelinde and Count Acfred I of Carcassonne. William the Young maintained his loyalty to King Charles the Simple. His brother Acfred died on 11 October 927, and Zuckerman calls him the last known scion of the Makhiri dynasty mentioned in non-Hebrew documents.

Margrave William married Engelberga the daughter of King Boso and Queen Ermengarde. Their son was named Boso, after his grandfather and died young during the life of his father.

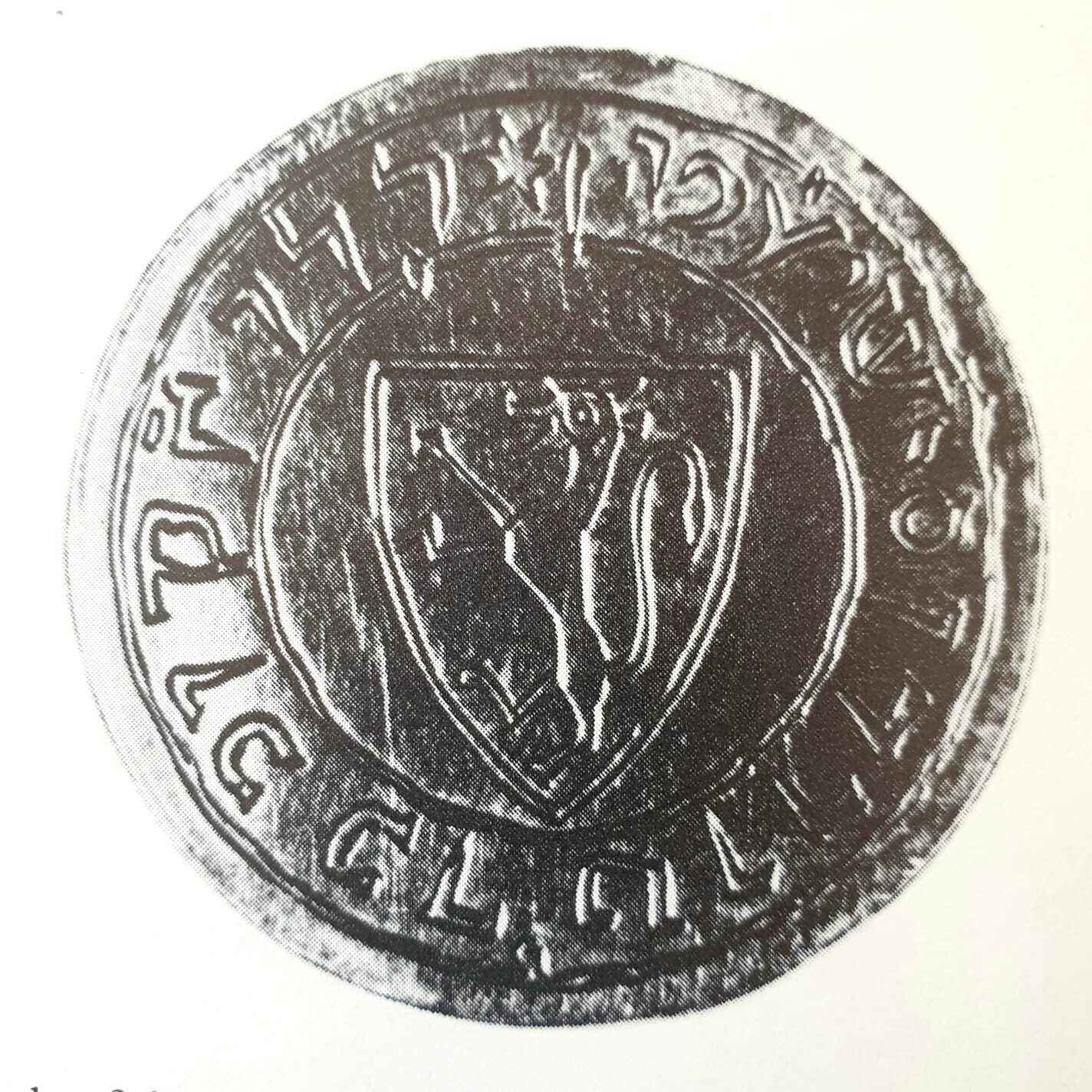
Matrix of the seal of nasi Kalonymos ben Todros, last Jewish ruler of Narbonne c. 1200 CE, showing the royal lion of Judah

== Legacy, descendants of the Makhiri Dynasty ==
Zuckerman's research follows what he sees as these Jewish princes until the tenth century, where their traces are lost in the chaotic conditions that marked the decline and eventual end of Carolingian rule. What he sees as a collateral branch of the family known as Kalonymides came to power when in the year 917 CE when King Charles the Simple invited Rabbi Moses the Elder and his family to emigrate from Lucca, and Zuckerman sees his son's name En-Kalonymos points to a residence in South of France.

Complementary ideas about nasi'im on both sides of the Pyrenees after the 10th century can be also found in sources about Benveniste family, in 11th-century Granada report that Josef son of Samuel ibn Nagrela started negotiation with a neighbouring ruler about setting up a Jewish principality which led to a riot or in Benbassa's report that the past glory of the Exilarchy still echoed in the internal Jewish pre-revolutionary discussion leading up to the French Revolution in 1788. Concerned about their future status, the French southwestern Jews "were convinced that they belonged to the aristocracy, if only because they were descended from the leading families of the tribe of Judah" and expressed worries that the upcoming emancipation could result in losing some of their privileges and reducing their status to the level of their Alsatian brothers.

== Zuckerman's Timeline ==
Years CE	
719–720	Muslims capture Narbonne
756	Emirate of Cordoba proclaimed independent from the Abbasid Caliphate
752–759	Pepin's siege of Narbonne, resulting in a conquest of the city with Jewish assistance
763–766	Makhir's exilarch succession challenged in Baghdad, he "leaves to the West". Paralleled with an upheaval in the Umayyad Caliphate.
765–768	Pepin's diplomatic mission to Baghdad
768	Makhir of Narbonne invited by the Carolingians as its first nasi and ruler. Jewish Princedom established in Narbonne, Septimania.
790	Young William Count of Toulouse replaced the in 790 dismissed Chorso as commander and Duke of Toulouse
791	Makhir's Conquest of the Hispanic Marches. Jewish Princedom becomes a permanent institution, recognised by Charlemagne
793	Makhir-Theodoric fell in battle in Pannonia, Saracens attacked Girona and Narbonne. William succeeds Makhir
797–803	William-Isaac is ambassador in Charlemagne's diplomatic mission to Baghdad and Jerusalem
800	Charlemagne crowned Emperor in Rome
803	William Count of Toulouse and Gellone captures Barcelona in November 803
816	Agobard of Lyon became archbishop of Lyon
before 823	William Count of Toulouse and Gellone died aged around 53
829	Bernard of Septimania became chamberlain of Louis the Pious
838	Bodo-Eleazar, Deacon of Emperor incident
840	death of Louis the Pious, Bernard's alliance with Pepin II.
844	Bernard executed in Toulouse. Vikings took Bordeaux and attack Toulouse in the same year
845 & 847	Vikings attacking Paris
846	Saracens invaded Italy
847	Salomon Makhiri arranged peace treaty with the Emir
850	Bernard's son William of Septimania was executed in Barcelona
863	Salomon went on a diplomatic mission to Cordoba
c. 869	Salomom Makhiri assassinated in Barcelona
864	Makhir of Auvergne (Bernard Plantevelue) replaced the rebelling Humphrey as Count of Autun
876	Makhir-Bernard reintegrated Barcelona into the Frank realm
877	Death of Emperor Charles the Bald
881	Charles the Fat became Emperor
886	Death of Makhir-Bernard
886	Markgrave William son of Makhir-Bernard confirmed as successor by Charles the Fat
888	Death of Emperor Charles the Fat
918	Death of Markgrave William, the last nasi of Makhiri dynasty
917	Kalonymides branch of family in succession
927	Death of Effroi, son of Markgrave William, last heir of the Makhiri dynasty

== Discussion and controversy ==
In 1972 Salo Wittmayer Baron wrote a foreword to the first edition of the Princedom, hoping that it will lead to reexamination of the source materials and much-needed extended scholarly debate about the dark period of Narbonnese Jewry. He points out that despite the efforts of Rashi and other Tosafists to impose upon medieval French Jewry observances as formulated by the Babylonia Talmud, many ancient traditions, divergent customs, uncommon behavioural patterns and kabbalistic speculations among the Jews of Narbonne and southern France survived as late as 14th century and can only be understood against the background of a uniquely independent Jewish community well apart from French and world Jewish cultural life.

In 1977, David H. Kelley wrote similar ideas about descents from King David, and followed this with a study in 2003 supporting Zuckerman's Princedom thesis in general. Kelley considered that Salomon, Count of Roussillon was indeed a Jewish king of Narbonne and is "a priori the most probable" of all suggested Jewish rulers. However, Salomon's identification with Bernard, Count of Auvergne is rejected. Further, he suggests that alternative to Zuckerman's identification of Makhir (Hebrew name) with exilarch Natronai (Aramaic name), instead positing that these were two distinct people, perhaps brothers. He considers it reasonable that both were of the House of David and likely descendants of the exilarch Bustanai. Further he considers reasonable that Isaac the Jew was indeed the son of Makhir and points out that Taylor's rejection of this possibility is wrong.

In 1982 Moncreiffe in his compilation of the British royals' genealogy mentions the difficulty to undertake genealogical research outside of Christendom, but portrays the conclusions of Zimmerman and the earlier work of Kelley as having a "strong probability", making a "good case" for identifying Makhir of Narbonne of the Royal House of David with Theuderic, Duke of Toulouse and making him ancestor of Arnaud 'manzer', Count of Angoulême, himself the forefather of Queen Isabella of Angoulême, mother of King Henry III of England.

However, in a review from 1973, Chazan criticised the Princedom book's interpretation of the Pope's Stephen III epistle, and in more general analysis of Zuckerman's thesis, Graboïs, Cohen and Bachrach all published articles critiquing elements of Zuckerman's thesis. In 1997, Taylor added to the prior published criticism a more general rejection of the idea of a Jewish Princedom and Makhiri dynasty, and lamented its spreading into genealogical circles. He considers the Jewish medieval sources and Chanson de geste to be mostly of a legendary nature, and therefore not very convincing. However, his strongest rejection addressed Zuckerman's postulated correlation of the "real or imagined" dynasty of Jewish leaders with the historically documented family of Count William of Gellone and the related onomastic evidence.

== Awards ==
Zuckerman received for this book the National Jewish Book Award for 1973 in the Jewish history category.

== Derivative works ==
Zuckerman's work added to the historical tapestry of Septimania, neighbouring counties and specifically the medieval Rennes-le-Château, which have long attracted mystery seekers and fantasy book authors, with their tales of lost treasures of the Second Temple last seen when the Visigoths conquered Rome are in the air, Holy Grail stories and medieval Jewish Kabbalist all meeting in the same geographical area. Zuckerman's account of a supposed Jewish Kingdom in Septimania has served as the inspiration for several works of fiction, including:

- The Messiah of Septimania by Lee Levin (2010) is a historic novel about Makhir, the first Jewish ruler of Septimania, based on Zuckerman's research.
- Septimania by Jonathan Levi (2017) is a fantasy novel combining present and past, spy agency, dyslexic math genius and the former Jewish Kingdom of Septimania into one mystery.

== See also ==
- County of Barcelona
- Hachmei Provence
- History of the Jews in France
- List of Jewish Kabbalists
- Treaty of Verdun
