= Todros =

Todros (Hebrew: טודרוס) is a Medieval Sephardic surname and given name that derives from the Greek “Theodoros” or "Theodoric", which means "gift/present of God". In some cases, Todros is a literal translation of the Hebrew biblical male name Natan-El.

Note the Christian Arabic equivalent Tadros.

== People with the given name Todros ==
- Todros Geller (1889) - Jewish-American artist.
- Todros Todrosi (1313) - Sephardic translator.
- Todros ben Judah Halevi Abulafia (1247) - Sephardic poet.
- Todros ben Joseph Abulafia (1225) - Chief Rabbi of Castile.
- Makhir of Narbonne*

== People with the patronymic Todros ==
- Isaac ben Todros (14th century) - Spanish Rabbi.
- Kalonymus ben Todros (1194) - Sephardic Nasi.
- Meir ben Todros HaLevi Abulafia (1170) - Spanish Rabbi.

== Fictional people with the surname Todros ==
- David Todros
- Izaak Todros – a fictional character from the novel Meir Ezofowicz by Eliza Orzeszkowa.
