= Offa Rex =

Offa Rex may refer to:

- Offa rex, meaning 'King Offa', inscription on Offa's imitation dinar and other coins
- Offa Rex, project that led to The Queen of Hearts (album)
