= Makhir =

Makhir may refer to:

- Maakhir - Ancient name of the coastal region in northern Somalia. It is often spelled Makhir.
- Makhir of Narbonne - a Jewish scholar.
