= Meir Ezofowicz =

1878 Polish novel

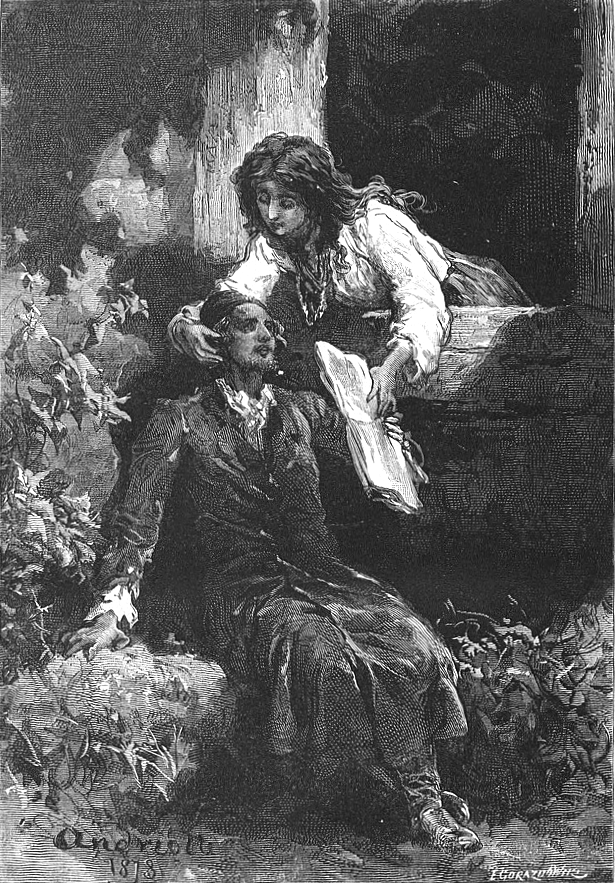
Meir and Golda

Meir Ezofowicz is an 1878 novel by Polish writer Eliza Orzeszkowa. It pictures the life of the Jews in a fictional shtetl, in which a conflict between the conservative and liberal tendencies takes place.

== Plot sketch ==
The story is set in a fictional shtetl of Szybów in the Pale of Settlement, in Belarus. There are two influential families: the Sephardic Todros family, representing the traditional deeply religious Judaism, and the Ezofowicz family, with liberal, enlightened tendencies. Young Meir Ezofowicz, a merchant, (Note: Ezofowicz protagonists were the descendants of the 16-th century prominent Józefowicz family.) tries to combat the backwardness and the fanaticism of the Jews from the shtetl.

Meir's opponent is Rabbi Izaak Todros, a religious fanatic and the leader of the Jewish community of the shtetl.

The plot includes the tragic love story of Meir and Golda, a girl from the outcast Karaite community, who becomes murdered. Eventually, by the efforts of Izaak Todros, he is banned from the shtetl, but his views influenced the younger generation of Szybów.

The illustrations were after Michał Elwiro Andriolli.

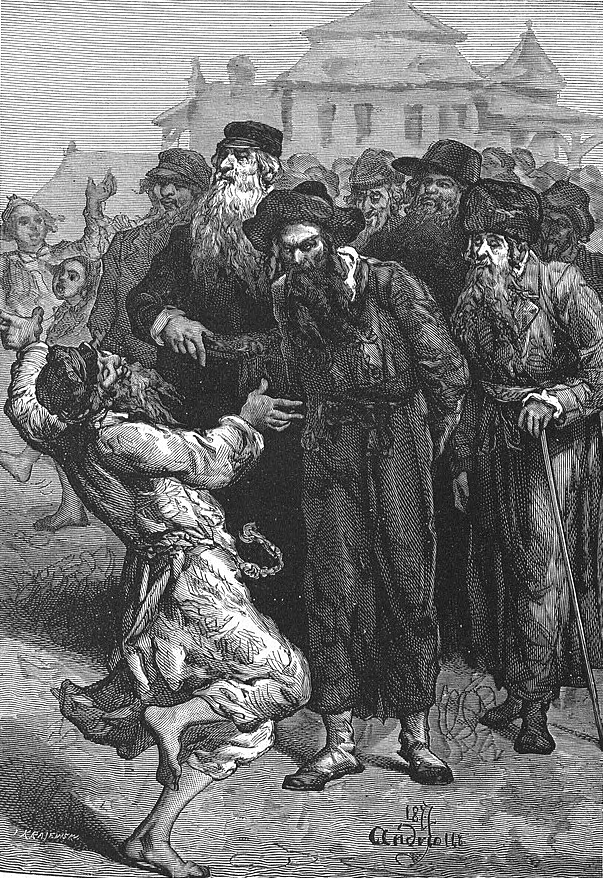
Izaak Todros strolls through Szybów

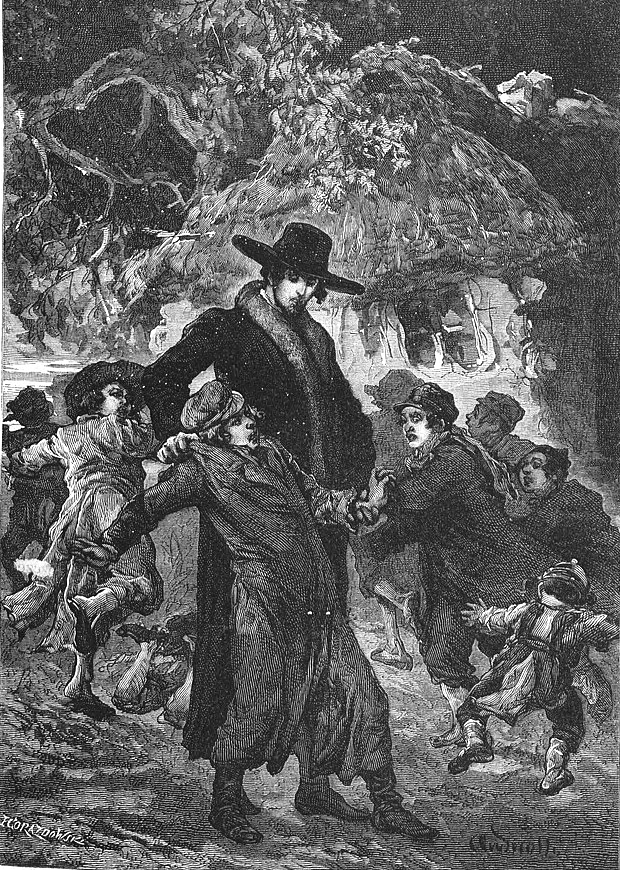
Meir by Karaites' house

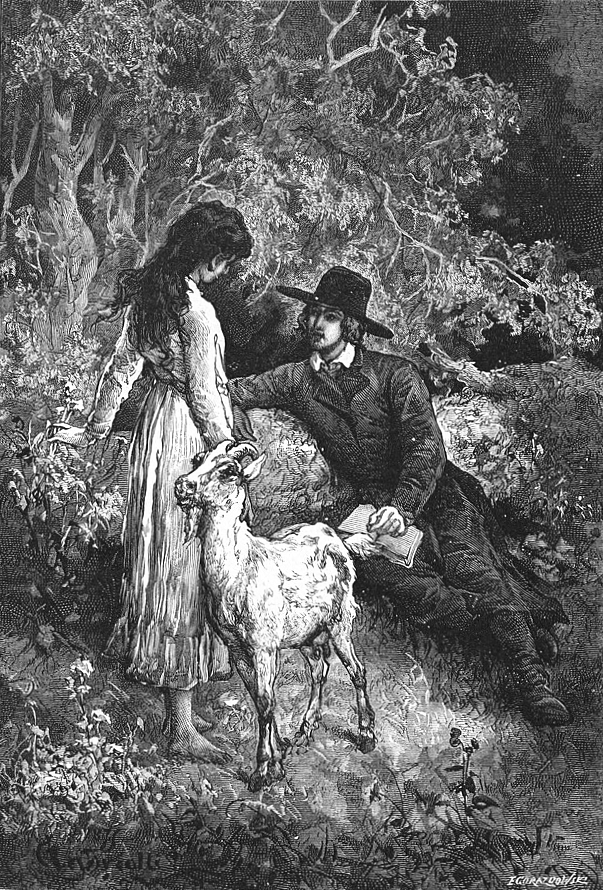
Meir and Golda violating yichud

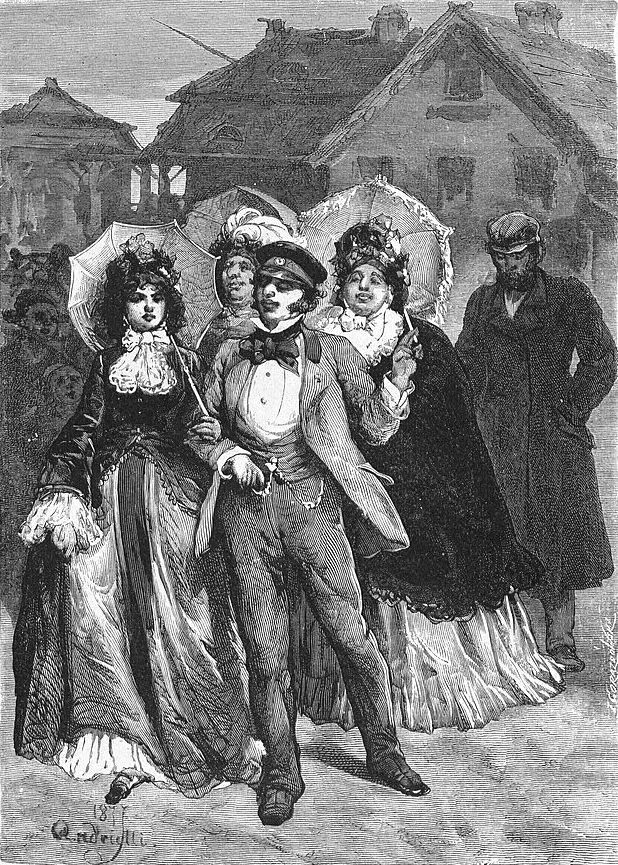
Polish noble Witebski family on a visit to Ezofowiczs

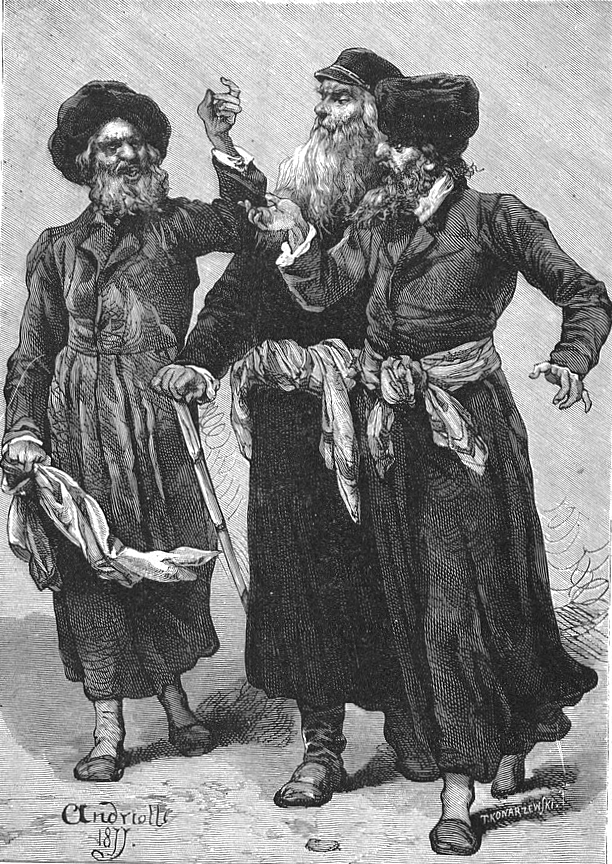
Szybów elders angered by Meir

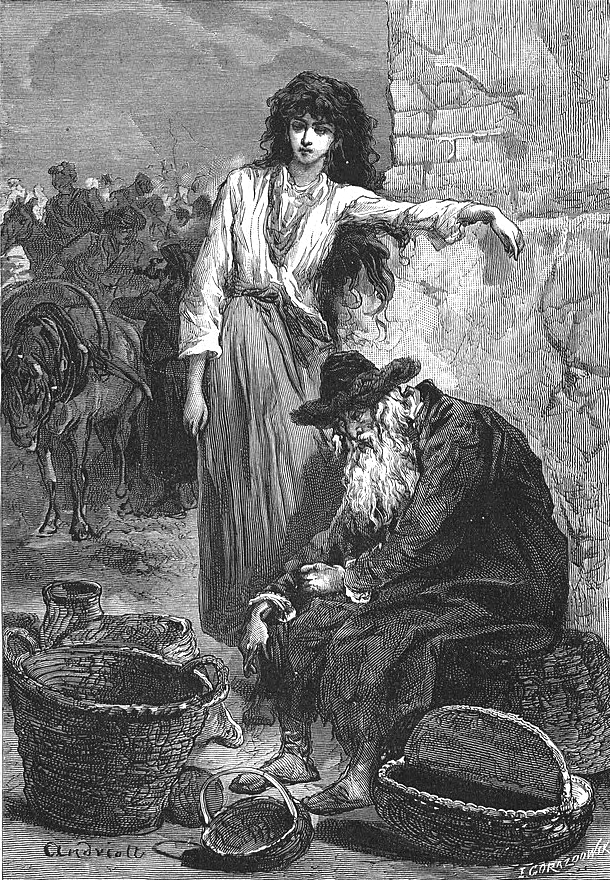
Golda and her father at a marketplace

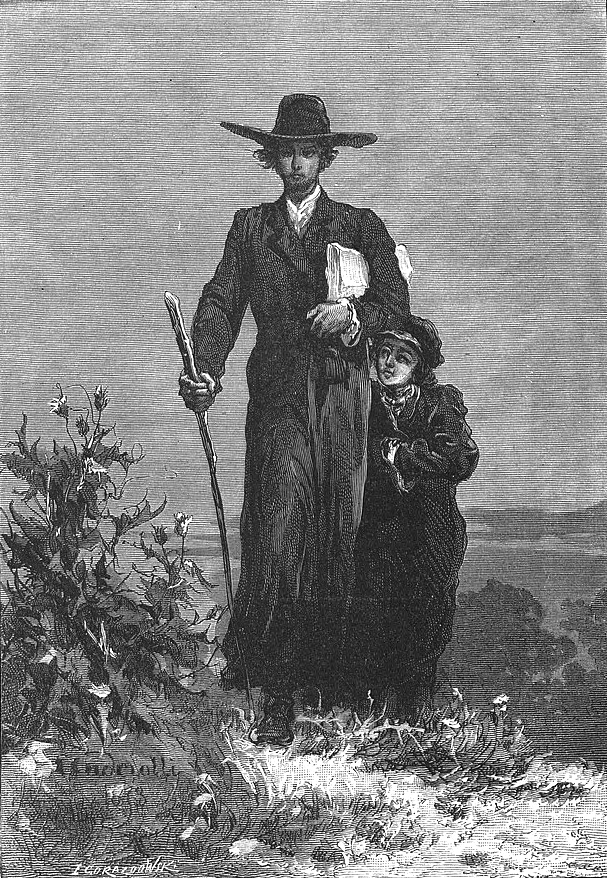
Meir banished

== Commentary ==
In the opinion of Britannica, the novel reflects the opinion that favors the Jewish assimilation, rather than religious tolerances. The 1911 version opined that the novel "the conflict between Jewish orthodoxy and modern liberalism."

== Influence ==
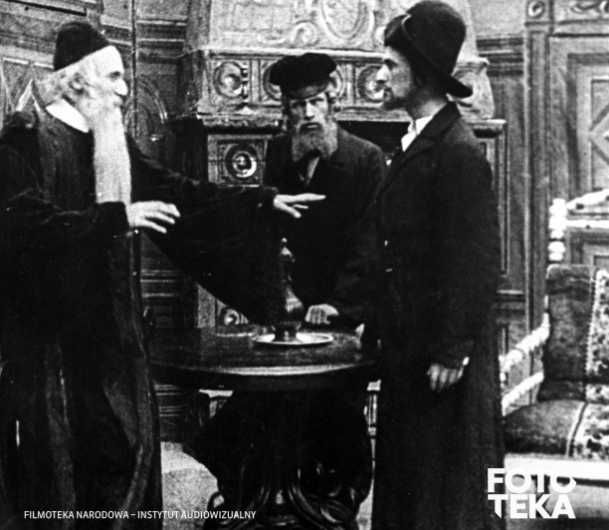
A snapshot from the film Meir Ezofowicz.

There was a 1911 Polish film with the same title, preserved inly is several fragments.
