= Basel roll =

9th century manuscript of the Carolingian Empire

The roll as it appears today, in two pieces with damage on the right side

The Basel roll is a manuscript containing three administrative documents in Latin from the Carolingian Empire. The documents were composed for Charlemagne during his reign as emperor (801–814) and the manuscript that survives was copied somewhat later in the ninth century. The purpose of the documents was to assess the financial needs of the patriarchate of Jerusalem in preparation for the sending of funds for its personnel and the repair of its buildings.

The roll is evidence of the practical side of Abbasid–Carolingian diplomacy. The information in it was collected by emissaries sent by Charlemagne with the permission of the Muslim authorities. To the historian, it provides information on the state of the church in the Holy Land on the eve of the Abbasid civil war, especially of its personnel and buildings. Since it was compiled orally and not from written sources, it provides clues to the linguistic situation in the Holy Land at the time.

== Description ==
It is a rotulus (roll) made from a single piece of parchment, written on the flesh side only. It is now broken in two pieces and damaged, with a part of the text lost. It is a copy of a lost original, which was probably made of papyrus, also in the form of a roll. The text is written in a fine Caroline minuscule with the use of capital letters and punctuation. Based on the style of the script, it was probably copied in the Upper Rhineland in the second quarter of the ninth century. It was probably copied for the Emperor Louis the Pious (r. 814–840), who is known to have sent an embassy to Jerusalem at an unknown date and may have sent funds with it.

The roll is now shelfmark N I 2, fols. 12–13 in the Öffentliche Bibliothek der Universität Basel. At some point, probably in the later Middle Ages, the roll was discarded and recycled. It was discovered in the binding of an unidentified book by Franz Dorotheus Gerlach or perhaps Wilhelm Wackernagel in the middle decades of the nineteenth century. Its history prior to this is uncertain, but it was probably deposited in a monastery in the late ninth or tenth century after it had served its administrative purpose. It contains some pen trials of seemingly monastic origin from that period.

== Documents ==
=== Date and place ===
The roll's reference to the "empire of the Lord Charles" dates its contents to the period 801–814, during the reign of Charlemagne. The documents were probably composed before the autumn of 810. Between October and 25 December that year, Charlemagne held a meeting in the palace of Aachen to discuss "the alms that had to be sent to Jerusalem on account of God's churches that needed to be repaired," which seems to imply that the needs of the church of Jerusalem were known at court by then. This meeting is known from a surviving capitulary.

Evidence internal to the documents shows that they was compiled by westerners in the Holy Land and neither by locals nor from other written documents. This would only have been possible with the permission of the Muslim authorities, which connects the work with one of Charlemagne's embassies to the Abbasid caliph. Of the recorded embassies, those which returned in 806 and 808 are candidates. Michael McCormick favours the second, led by Agamus and Roculf, which corresponds to the period 807–808, during which the abbot of the Frankish monastery on the Mount of Olives—unmentioned in the roll—was away in Europe. He further speculates that the delay in taking up the issue until 810 may have been caused by the outbreak of the filioque controversy at Christmas 807.

=== Structure ===
The roll contains three Latin documents with separate titles and explicits, known by their short titles as the Breve, Memoria and Dispensa. Their long titles are:

- Breue commemoratorii de illis casis Dei uel monasteriis qui sunt in sancta ciuitate Hierusalem uel in circuitu eius ("inventory memorandum of God's houses and monasteries that are in the Holy City Jerusalem and its environs")
- Memoria de illis monasteriis quae sunt in extremis Hierusalem in terra promissionis ("memorial of the monasteries that are in the Promised Land outside of Jerusalem")
- Dispensa patriarchae inter presbiteris, diaconibus, monachis, clericis, et omne congregatione eccle[siae per unum] annum ("Expenditures of the patriarch, including for priests, deacons, monks, clerics, and the entire congregation of the church [for one] year")

The Breve and Memoria are structured as series of entries of the same form. Each entry gives the name or location of a shrine, sometimes with a description, which may indicate its builder or its state of repair. This is followed by the types of clergy present with the numbers for each. In the Breve, these numbers do not show signs of rounding and are presumably accurate headcounts. In the Memoria, the numbers mostly appear to have been rounded to the nearest five. Owing to damage to the manuscript, the Dispensa is incomplete. Only the first three lines (about five entries) are preserved. It is uncertain how much longer the work went.

The order in which churches and officials are listed in the roll does not reflect the actual order of precedence in the patriarchate. This and certain linguistic clues indicate that the document was created through interviews with persons who spoke Greek and Arabic and did not rely on written sources from the patriarchate, which would have preserved precedence.

=== Contents ===
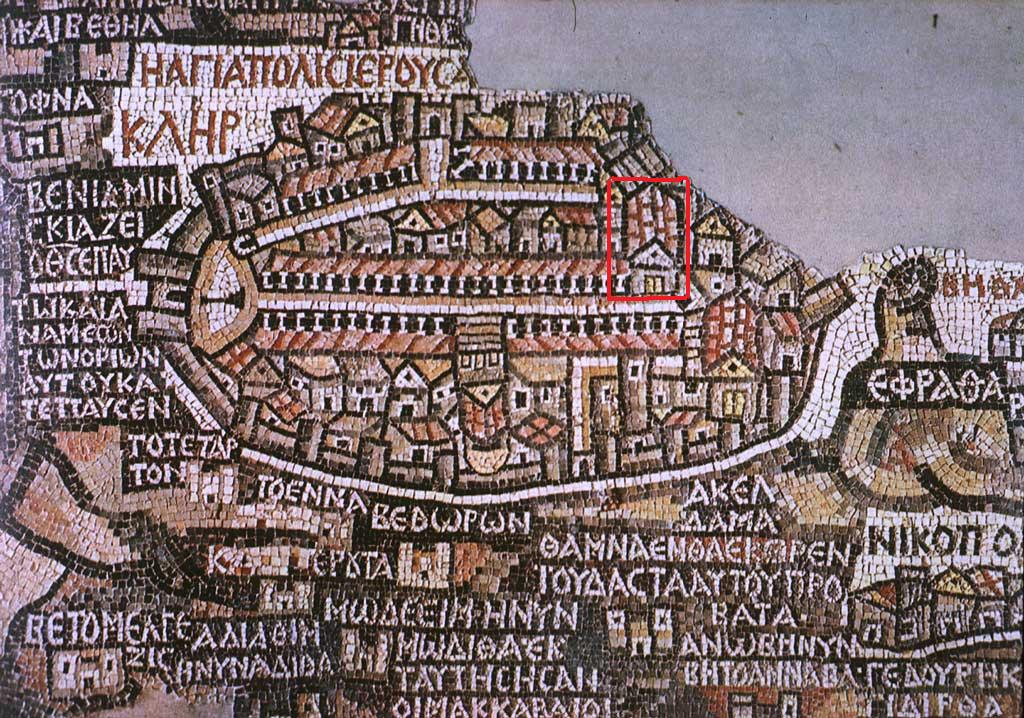
The New Church of the Theotokos (outlined in red) on the Madaba map

The Breve lists 26 churches and three monasteries with their attached religious, plus 36 hermits not attached to particular churches "in Jerusalem and in its surrounding within upward of a mile". Of the hermits in and around the Mount of Olives, their languages are specified. They include Latin, Greek, Arabic, Georgian, Syriac and Armenian:

Hermits who reside scattered in their cells, 11 who sing the psalms in Greek; Georgians, 4; Syrians, 6; Armenians, 2; Latins 5, one who sings the psalms in Arabic. Along the steps, when you go up to the holy mount: 2 hermits, one Greek, the other Syrian. At the top of the steps in Gethsemane, 3 hermits, a Greek, a Syrian and a Georgian.

The Church of the Holy Sepulchre under the patriarch himself was by far the largest establishment and the only one with personnel besides priests, clerics, monks and nuns. Its total complement consisted of 9 priests, 14 deacons, 6 subdeacons, 23 canons, 13 guards, 41 monks, 12 candle bearers, 17 servants of the patriarch, 2 provosts, 2 pursers, 2 notaries, 2 priests to oversee the Holy Sepulchre, 1 priest at Calvary, 2 priests of the Lord's Chalice, 1 priest of the True Cross, 1 priest of the Face-Cloth and 15 servants, including the synkellos, cellarers, treasurers and porters. The total number of personnel is 162, although the roll itself provides the sum of 150, possibly a copyist's error.

The Memoria covers the monasteries and churches outside of Jerusalem. Whereas the Breve contains no names, it gives the names of the abbots of the monasteries of Mount Sinai, Saint Theodosius, Saint Gerasimos and Choziba and bishops of the dioceses of Sebastia, Mount Tabor and Tiberias. The abbot of Mar Saba and the bishop of Nablus are unnamed. The Memoria has sustained much greater damage than the Breve. Both the name of the abbot and the number of monks, for example, are missing from the entry on the Palaia Lavra of Saint Chariton.

The Memoria also lists measurements of four monuments: the New Church of the Theotokos in Jerusalem, the Church of the Nativity in Bethlehem, the Holy Sepulchre complex in Jerusalem and the Church of Zion in Jerusalem. The unit of measurement used is the dexter (from Late Latin dextans), equivalent to five feet. While the foot used in the Carolingian Empire was the Roman foot, Charlemagne's surveyors appear to have used a measuring rod based on the Byzantine foot, which was 1.6 centimetres (0.63 in) longer. The Memoria attributes the ruined state of the New Church to "the earthquake" (ille terrae motus). This probably refers to the major Galilean earthquake of 749, although more recent earthquakes are known to have struck the region. Al-Ṭabarī records ones in Egypt in AH 180 (AD 796–797) and Cilicia in 187 (802–803). The De plaga also attests to an earthquake that affected Jerusalem around 797.

The Dispensa is incomplete, but records 1,660 solidi of annual expenditures of the patriarchate for the clergy, for the patriarch, for the buildings, for one item unidentified owing to damage and "for the Saracens". The total of expenditures may have been around 2,500 solidi. The solidi indicated are the local gold dinars, of which 1,660 were equal to 7.1 kilograms (16 lb) of gold in the early ninth century. The expense of 80 solidi "for the Saracens" may represent the payment of jizya for ecclesiastical personnel.

=== Language ===
The language of the documents contains features of "late Popular Latin" or Proto-Romance, indicating that that was the author's native language. It also shows that the copyist corrected its orthography to bring it more in line with classical norms as understood in the Carolingian era. Repeated phrases suggest that all three documents were written by the same individual. The terminology also suggests a connection with Italy and possibly with the circle of Charlemagne's cousin, Adalhard of Corbie.

Since the documents were written in the Holy Land with the help of locals, they contain a few Greek and Arabic words, Greek being the liturgical language of the patriarchate of Jerusalem and Arabic increasingly the spoken language (at the expense of Aramaic). Greek words preserved in the Breve include fragelites (for phragellitai, "whip men", originally crowd control officers) and synkellos. In at least one case, the Latin word (conputarii) is an unusual calque of the Greek (logothetai). There are also Arabic words. The dome of the Church of the Holy Sepulchre is called an alcuba (from al-qubba, whence "alcove") and Georgians are referred to as Iorzani (from Jūrzān, as opposed to Greek Iberoi).

=== Purpose and effect ===
The Breve, Memoria and Dispensa are administrative documents that offer valuable information about the practicalities of Carolingian government. Their ultimate purpose was charitable. They were compiled on the ground by means of oral testimony and physical measuring to ascertain the financial needs of a foreign church, both for paying and feeding its personnel and repairing its buildings. Einhard's Vita Karoli Magni, a biography of Charlemagne, explains the emperor's thinking and the connection between his charity and his diplomacy: "he had learned that Christians were living in poverty and he took pity on their indigence, and was accustomed to send money to Jerusalem, Alexandria and Carthage. This was the main reason he sought the friendship of overseas kings, so that a certain amount of relief and mitigation might reach the Christians living under their dominion."

This mission was probably a response to a request from the Christians of the Holy Land, perhaps the Patriarch Thomas I, who sent envoys in 807 and a letter to Pope Leo III that arrived at the same time as the embassy of Agamus and Roculf returned. There are two pieces of indirect evidence that monies were sent by Charlemagne and used for their intended purpose. Writing in the tenth century, the Patriarch Eutychius of Alexandria records that Thomas repaired the dome of the Church of the Holy Sepulchre in 813. Also writing in the tenth century, the Emperor Constantine VII records that Charlemagne, "sending much money and abundant wealth to Palestine, [re]built a very large number of monasteries."

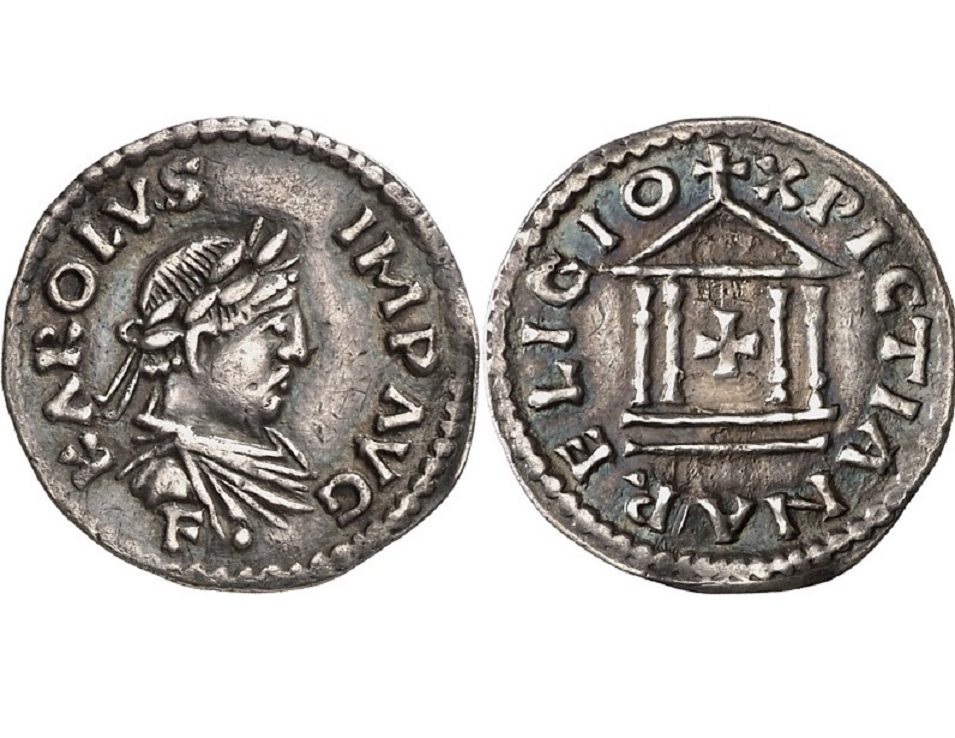
Charlemagne's portrait coinage, which may have been designed for use overseas

The rare portrait coinage of Charlemagne, minted only in 811–814, may have been designed to be sent overseas as alms. The ruler's portrait in Roman style, combined with the legend "Christian religion" and a depiction of the Church of the Holy Sepulchre, asserted Charlemagne's power and imperial protection. In this way, Charlemagne offered what protection and support he could to Christians caught in the Abbasid civil war that broke out following the death of the Caliph Harūn al-Rashīd in 809 and to his own faction in the filioque controversy. The Memoria refers to an attack of "Arab bandits" (Sarraceni latrones) on the monastery of Saint Theodosius, which may be the same attack recorded by Theophanes the Confessor in 809 following Harūn's death, although banditry was common enough that this is uncertain.

== Modern study ==
The documents on the roll were first edited and published in a diplomatic edition by Giovanni Battista de Rossi in 1865. In 1874, Titus Tobler published a critical edition alongside a new diplomatic edition produced by Ludwig Sieber. In 1880, Auguste Molinier republished Tobler's edition with only minor orthographic changes and without Sieber's text. Karl Schmid produced a new edition before his death in 1993, but it was never published. Schmid did, however, increase awareness of the roll through a study published in 1974. According to Michael McCormick, the edition of Sieber was the best and that of Tobler and Molinier should be avoided. McCormick published a critical edition with an English translation and colour facsimile of the manuscript in 2011.

Study of the Basel roll reveals that the church of Jerusalem had declined both in size and wealth in the first century and a half under Islam. The measurements in the roll have also been used to estimate the size of lost monuments, such as the New Church of the Theotokos. The roll also offers evidence against the long accepted notion that Charlemagne's imperial rule after 800 was a period of decline and decomposition. According to Marios Costambeys, it "resets our estimation of both the scope and the capabilities of the Carolingian regime." McCormick compares it to a contemporary report by Archbishop Leidrad of Lyon from 809–812. Addressed to Charlemagne, Leidrad's report contains a description of the buildings, personnel and revenues (but not expenditures) of his diocese.

== Bibliography ==
- Costambeys, Marios (2014). "Review of McCormick 2011". The Catholic Historical Review. 100 (2): 325–327. doi:10.1353/cat.2014.0097. JSTOR 43898614. S2CID 159320023.
- Davis, Jennifer R. (2015). Charlemagne's Practice of Empire. Cambridge University Press.
- Fried, Johannes (2016) [2013]. Charlemagne. Translated by Peter Lewis. Harvard University Press.
- Griffith, Sidney H. (1989). "Anthony David of Baghdad, Scribe and Monk of Mar Sabas: Arabic in the Monasteries of Palestine". Church History. 58 (1): 7–19. doi:10.2307/3167675. JSTOR 3167675. S2CID 197841275.
- MacLean, Simon (2013). "Review of McCormick 2011". Speculum. 88 (3): 830–831. doi:10.1017/S0038713413002649. JSTOR 43576829.
- McCormick, Michael (2011). Charlemagne's Survey of the Holy Land: Wealth, Personnel, and Buildings of a Mediterranean Church between Antiquity and the Middle Ages. Dumbarton Oaks Research Library and Collection.
- Nelson, Janet L. (2019). King and Emperor: A New Life of Charlemagne. Penguin.
- Schmid, Karl (1974). "Aachen und Jerusalem: Ein Beitrag zur historischen Personenforschung der Karolingerzeit". In Karl Hauck (ed.). Das Einhardkreuz: Vorträge und Studien der Münsteraner Diskussion zum "arcus Einhardi" (PDF). Göttingen. pp. 122–142.
