= Adalhelm of Autun =

8th and 9th century Frankish nobleman

Adalhelm of Autun (Alleaume d'Autun) was a Frankish nobleman of the late 8th and early 9th centuries from the Guilhemid family. He was the son of Thierry IV, Count of Autun, and Alda, who was possibly a daughter of Charles Martel. From one of the most prominent noble families of the Carolingian Empire, Adalhelm was closely connected to the imperial court and played a role in significant religious foundations of his era.

== Historical context ==
Adalhelm lived during the height of the Carolingian Empire under his relative Charlemagne. The Guilhemid (or Wilhelmid) family was among the most influential noble houses in Carolingian Francia, with extensive holdings in Autun, Septimania, and Aquitaine. The family's prominence stemmed from their close kinship with the Carolingian rulers and their strategic control of key territories along the Frankish frontier with Muslim Spain.

The abbey of Gellone, founded by Adalhelm's brother William, represented part of the broader Carolingian policy of establishing monastic centers to consolidate Christian control over recently conquered territories and provide spiritual guidance to the nobility.

== Role in Gellone Abbey foundation ==
Adalhelm's primary historical attestation comes from the foundation charter of Gellone Abbey, dated 15 December 804, where he served as a witness alongside his brothers Theodoen and another Thierry. The charter, which established the Benedictine monastery in the Gellone valley near present-day Saint-Guilhem-le-Désert, was part of his brother William's preparation for entering monastic life.

This document represents the only contemporary source that directly mentions Adalhelm, making him one of many lesser-known members of the Carolingian nobility whose historical footprint is limited to their participation in significant family or religious events.

== Family connections ==
Adalhel was called as a witness in the charters of the foundation of the abbey of Gellone by his brother William, 15 December 804. Two other brothers signed these charters: Theodoen and a Thierry who is not mentioned in any charters.

On the basis of onomastics, two children have been assigned to him:

- Waldrada of Autun, who married Adrian, Count of Orléans, a count palatine and brother of Hildegard, Charlemagne's queen. This connection would have significantly elevated the family's status within the imperial court.
- Bernard I of Poitiers, who served as Count of Poitiers in 815 and 825, continuing the family's tradition of holding important administrative positions in the Carolingian administration.

These attributions, while not definitively proven by contemporary sources, are based on naming patterns and geographic connections that suggest continuity within the Guilhemid family network.
