= Abbasid–Carolingian alliance =

8th–9th-century political relationship

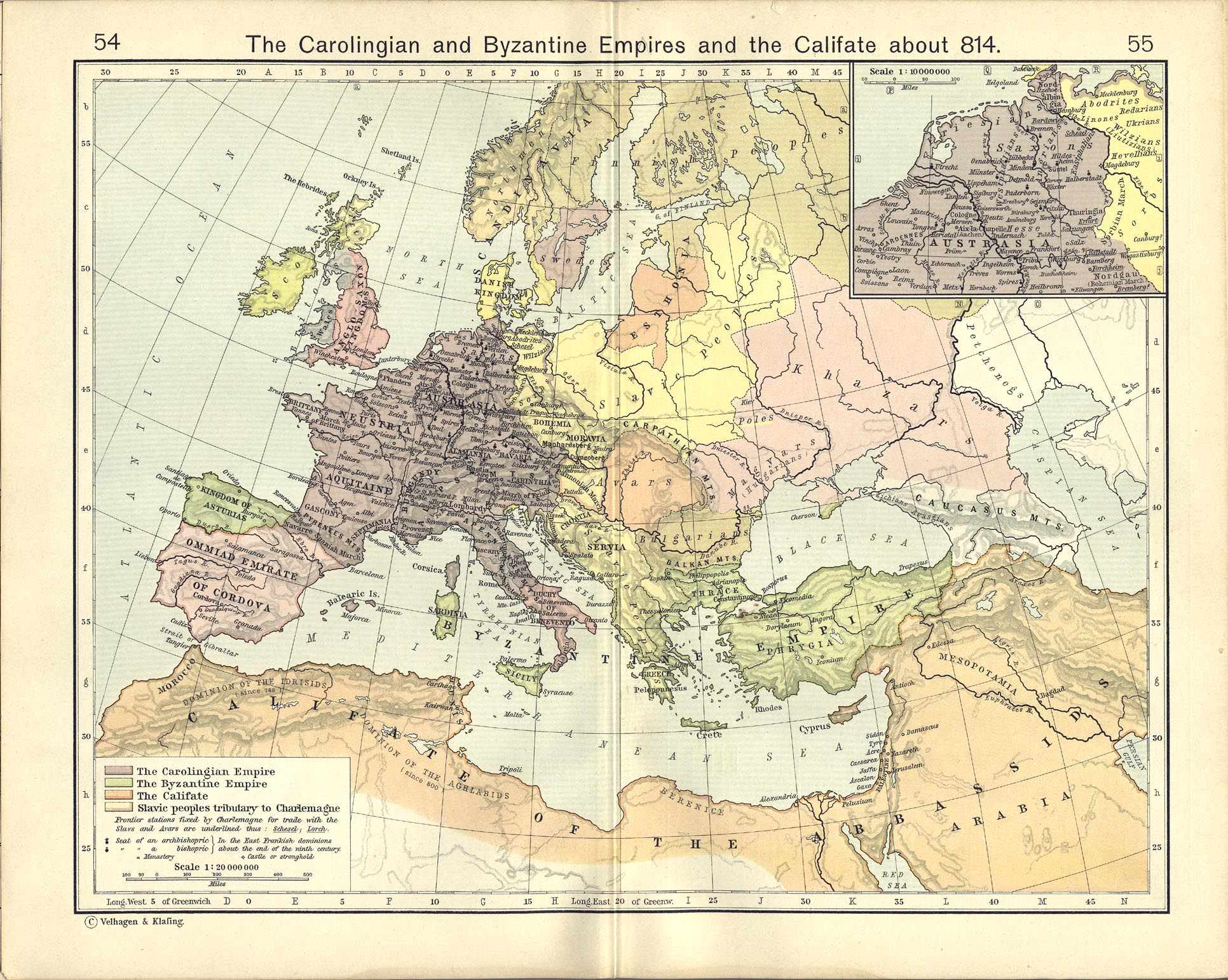
Map of the Abbasid and Carolingian empires around 814

There was an Abbasid–Carolingian alliance during the 8th and 9th centuries, effected through a series of embassies, rapprochements and combined military operations between the Frankish Carolingian Empire and the Abbasid Caliphate.

The alliance is likely to have formed first between Pepin the Short and al-Mansur, and later to have continued under Charlemagne and Harun al-Rashid. These contacts followed the intense conflict between the Carolingians and the Emirate of Córdoba, marked by the Battle of Tours in 732, and were aimed at establishing a counter-alliance with the 'faraway' Abbasid Empire based in the Near East. Slightly later, another Carolingian-Abbasid alliance was attempted in a conflict against the Byzantine Empire.

== Primary sources ==
Direct evidence for Abbasid–Carolingian diplomacy comes almost entirely from Frankish (Latin) sources. These are mostly contemporary or nearly so. Especially important are the quasi-official Royal Frankish Annals, Einhard's Vita Karoli magni and the anonymous Vita Hludowici imperatoris. There is also indirect evidence. Charlemagne's elephant is referenced by Dicuil, an Irishman writing around 825. Likewise, the Basel roll, a record of a survey of the church in the Holy Land commissioned by Charlemagne, corroborates Einhard's account.

The absence of references to Abbasid–Carolingian diplomacy in Islamic sources is not peculiar. The major Arabic history of the period, that of al-Ṭabarī, routinely records relations only with the Byzantine Empire. Otherwise routine diplomacy that went smoothly goes unreported. There is no reference to diplomatic contacts with Tang China, for example, which is known directly only from Chinese sources. There is only one contemporary source from the Abbasid Caliphate that refers to diplomacy with Charlemagne, versions III and IV of the Arabic Sibylline prophecy, which were redacted in the aftermath of Harun's death.

== Background ==
The Umayyad invasion of Gaul from 719 to 759 was a period of intense conflict between the Carolingians and the Umayyads, marked by the Battle of Tours in 732. Umayyad forces were finally expelled from Gaul with the conquest of Narbonne in 759 by Pepin the Short, but the Umayyad presence in the Iberian peninsula continued to represent a challenge to the Carolingians.

== Pepin the Short and al-Mansur ==
=== Embassies ===
Contacts between the Carolingians and the Abbasids started soon after the establishment of the Abbasid Caliphate and the concomitant fall of the Umayyad Caliphate in 751. The Carolingian ruler Pepin the Short had a powerful enough position in Europe to "make his alliance valuable to the Abbasid caliph of Baghdad, al-Mansur". Former supporters of the Umayyad Caliphate were established in southern Spain under Abd ar-Rahman I, and constituted a strategic threat both to the Carolingians on their southern border, and the Abbasids at the western end of their dominion. Embassies were exchanged both ways, with the apparent objective of cooperating against the Umayyads of Cordova (Al-Andalus): a Frankish embassy went to Baghdad in 765, which returned to Europe after three years with numerous presents, and an Abbasid embassy from al-Mansur visited France in 768.

=== Commercial exchanges ===
Commercial exchanges occurred between the Carolingian and Abbasid realms, and Arabic coins are known to have spread in Carolingian Europe in that period. Arab gold is reported to have circulated in Europe during the 9th century, apparently in payment of the export of slaves, timber, iron and weapons from Europe to Eastern lands. It is noted that Charlemagne made attempts to establish an open market between the Carolingians and Abbasids, possibly as a means for the Carolingians to economically benefit from trade with the Abbasids. As a famous example, the 8th century English king Offa of Mercia is known to have minted copies of Abbasid dinars struck in 774 by Caliph Al-Mansur with "Offa Rex" centered on the reverse amid inscriptions in Pseudo-Kufic script.

== Charlemagne and Harun al-Rashid ==
=== Strategic interest in Spain (777–778) ===
In 777, pro-Abbasid rulers of northern Spain contacted the Carolingian to request help against the powerful Umayyad Emirate of Córdoba in southern Spain, led by Abd ar-Rahman I. The "Spanish Abbasids sought support for their cause in Pepin's Francia; he was content to oblige because the Cordovan dynasty posed a constant military threat to southwestern France".

Sulayman al-Arabi the pro-Abbasid Wali (governor) of Barcelona and Girona sent a delegation to Charlemagne in Paderborn, offering his submission, together with the allegiance of Husayn of Zaragoza and Abu Taur of Huesca in return for military aid. The three pro-Abbasid rulers also conveyed that the caliph of Baghdad, Muhammad al-Mahdi, was preparing an invasion force against the Umayyad ruler Abd al-Rhaman I.

Following the sealing of this alliance at Paderborn, Charlemagne marched across the Pyrenees in 778 "at the head of all the forces he could muster". His troops were welcomed in Barcelona and Girona by Sulayman al-Arabi. As he moved towards Zaragoza, the troops of Charlemagne were joined by troops led by Sulayman. Husayn of Zaragoza, however, refused to surrender the city, claiming that he had never promised Charlemagne his allegiance. Meanwhile, the force sent by the Baghdad caliphate seems to have been stopped near Barcelona. After a month of siege at Zaragoza, Charlemagne decided to return to his kingdom. On his retreat, Charlemagne suffered an attack from the Basques in central Navarra. As a reprisal he attacked Pamplona, destroying it. However, on his retreat north his baggage train was ambushed by the Basques at the Battle of Roncevaux Pass on August 15, 778.

Charlemagne's conflict with the Umayyad Emir of Cordova is one of the possible military conflicts which made him an ally of Harun al-Rashid, as they found a common enemy to unite against.

For Charlemagne, the alliance may also have functioned as a counterweight against the Byzantine Empire, which was opposed to his role in Italy and his claim to the title of Roman Emperor. For Harun al-Rashid, there was an advantage in having a partner against his rivals in the Emirate of Cordova (Al-Andalus).

=== Embassies ===
After these campaigns, there were again numerous embassies between Charlemagne and the Abbasid caliph Harun al-Rashid from 797, apparently in view of a Carolingian-Abbasid alliance against Byzantium, or with a view to gaining an alliance against the Umayyads of Cordova.

Three embassies were sent by Charlemagne to Harun al-Rashid's court and the latter sent at least two embassies to Charlemagne.

The 797 embassy, the first one from Charlemagne, was composed of three men, Isaac the Jew (probably as interpreter), Lantfrid and Sigimud. Four years later in 801, an Abbasid embassy arrived in Pisa. They met with Charlemagne who was present in Italy at that time. In 799, Charlemagne sent another mission to the Patriarch of Jerusalem, with which the Patriarch of Jerusalem sent Charlemagne the keys to the Holy Sepulcher and the site of Calvary, as well as a Jerusalem Banner.

In 802, a second embassy was sent by Charlemagne, which returned in 806. In 807, Rodbertus, Charlemagne's ambassador died as he returned from Persia. In turn, Abdallah, Harun al-Rashid's envoy reached Charlemagne in Aachen accompanied by two monks from Jerusalem, George and Felix, who represented of the Patriarch Thomas.

The third and final embassy was sent by Charlemagne in 809, but it arrived after Harun al-Rashid had died. The embassy returned in 813 with messages of friendship, but little concrete results.

=== Diplomatic gifts ===
An inhabited initial B from a copy of Cassiodorus' Commentary on the Psalms made at the Abbey of Saint-Denis in the first quarter of the ninth century (now Paris, BnF lat. 2195) incorporates an elephant's head. The realistic portrayal of an Asian elephant suggests that the artist had seen Abul-Abbas.

The embassies sent by Charlemagne possessed sundry royal red fabrics, a textile noted to be of value within the Abbasid realm. In addition, Charlemagne sponsored the construction of the Church of St. Mary in Jerusalem and its library and sent sums of money with all of his envoys.

Harun al-Rashid is reported to have sent numerous presents to Charlemagne, including silks, a brass candelabra, perfume, balsam, a tent with multi-colored curtains, ivory chessmen, and an elephant named Abul al-Abbas. The 802 Royal Frankish Annals briefly describes the arrival of the emissary referred to as Isaac the Jew, who brought with him the elephant Abul al-Abbas. Abul al-Abbas is reported to have died suddenly in 810, while Charlemagne was on campaign in a town called "Lippeham".

The automatic water-clock made of brass, described in the 807 Royal Frankish Annals, and had spherical decorations which would strike cymbals below to create a chiming sound for each hour. There were also twelve figurines of horsemen that would animate at the end of each hour. Harun al-Rashid is also reported to have offered the custody of the Holy places in Jerusalem to Charlemagne.

The ivory elephant known as the Chessman of Charlemagne was traditionally held to have been a gift from Harun to Charlemagne. Although this is consistent with its dating, the earliest reference to the carved piece is from Paris in 1505.

=== Artistic influences ===
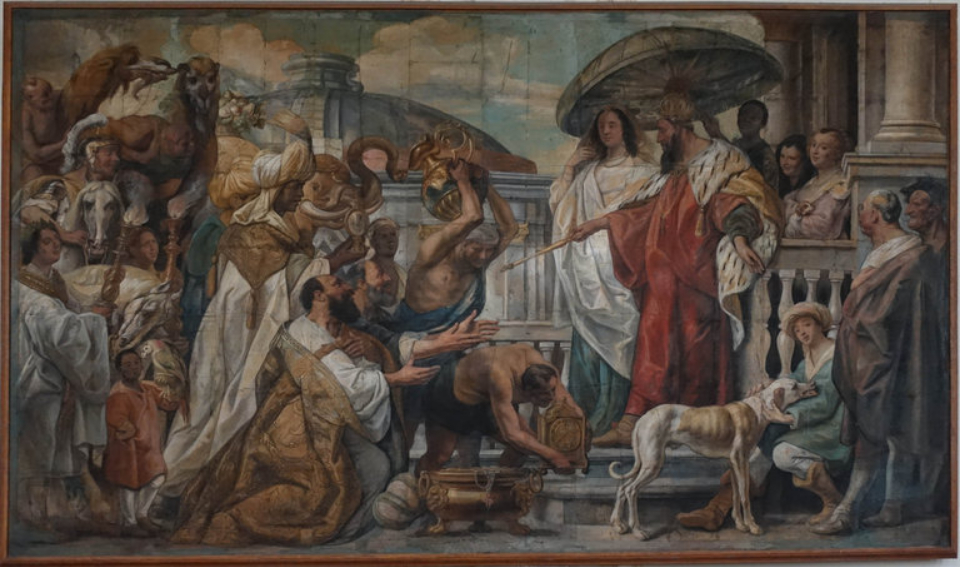
Diplomatic gifts of Harun al-Rashid for Charlemagne, painting by Jacob Jordaens

Various Islamic influences seem to appear in Christian religious architecture such as the multi-colored tile designs which may have been inspired by Islamic polychromy in the 800 CE gatehouse at Lorsch Abbey.

Early Carolingian architecture generally combines Roman, Early Christian, Byzantine, Islamic and Northern European designs.

The “Iconoclasm” that occurred in the Byzantine Empire from 732 to 842, influenced a Christian movement that destroyed idols, icons, amongst other images. Arnold Toynbee has postulated that the successes of the Islamic Military throughout the 8th centuries motivated Byzantine Christians to adopt the notion of Islam that does not favor the imagery of idols. Charlemagne has been recorded as following the iconoclastic fervor of the East Roman Emperor Leo Syrus, however, Charlemagne's attempts were ultimately stopped by Pope Adrian I.

== Lasting impacts ==
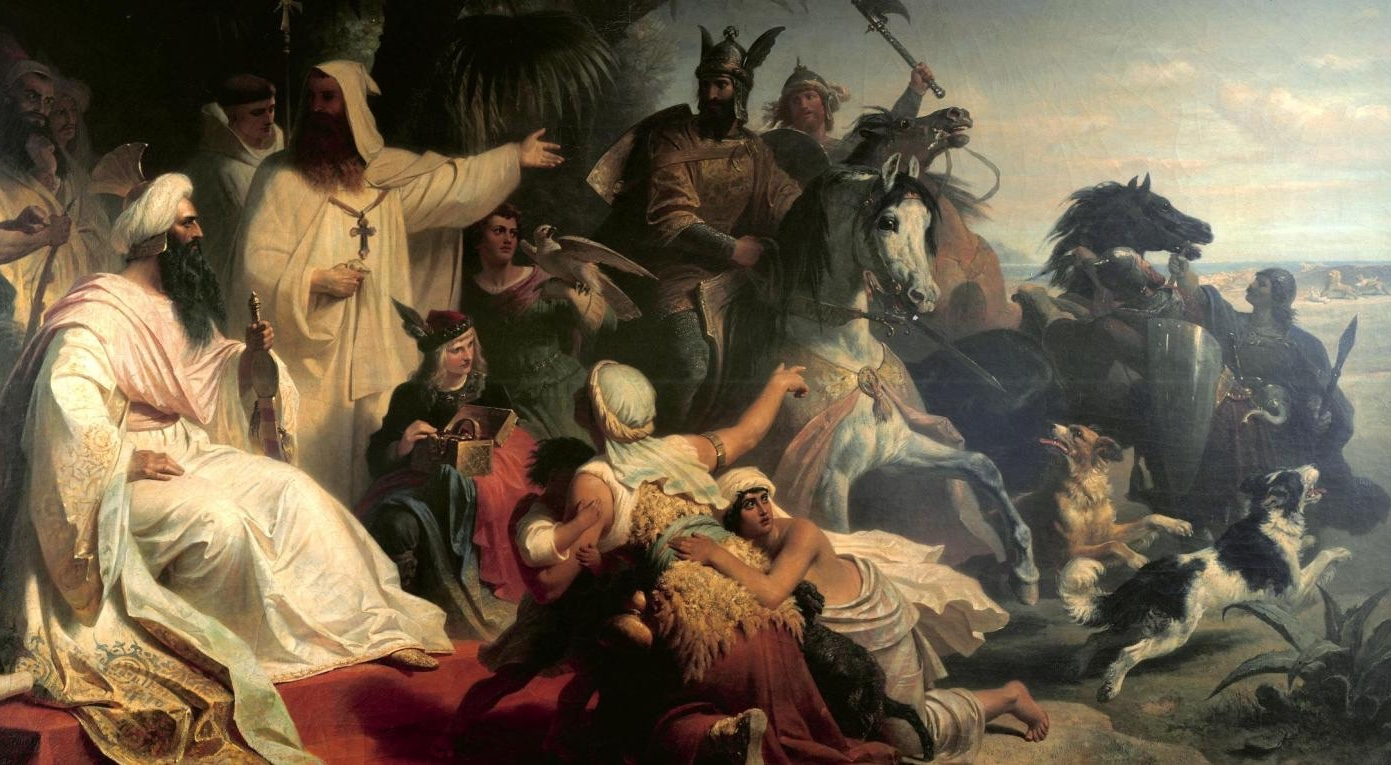
Romantic depiction of Harun receiving a Frankish delegation

It seems that in 831, Harun al-Rashid's son al-Ma'mun also sent an embassy to Louis the Pious. These embassies also seem to have had the objective of promoting commerce between the two realms.

After 814 and the accession of Louis the Pious to the throne, internal dissensions prevented the Carolingians from further ventures into Spain.

Almost a century later Bertha, daughter of Lothar II and mother of several tenth-century Italian kings, is reported to have sent an embassy to the Abbasid caliph Al-Muktafi, requesting friendship and a marital alliance.
