= Isaac the Jew =

8th-century Frankish diplomat

Isaac the Jew, also known by his Latin name "Isaac Judaeus", (died 836) was an 8th century Frankish Jew who was a favoured diplomat of Carolingian emperor Charlemagne. Isaac also served as an important community leader for the Frankish Jewish community. According to Arthur J. Zuckerman's book A Jewish Princedom in Feudal France, Isaac was a notable member of the House of Exilarchs; however this claim has been criticized by many.

== Early life ==
Isaac was born in Narbonne, France. In his adult years, Isaac became a prominent merchant in the Frankish lands, eventually gaining the attention of Charlemagne, who took a liking to the young man. Isaac was first employed by Charlemagne to go to the holy land and bring back precious merchandise, this was greatly successful and strengthened relations between the two men.

== Embassy to the Abbasid Caliphate ==
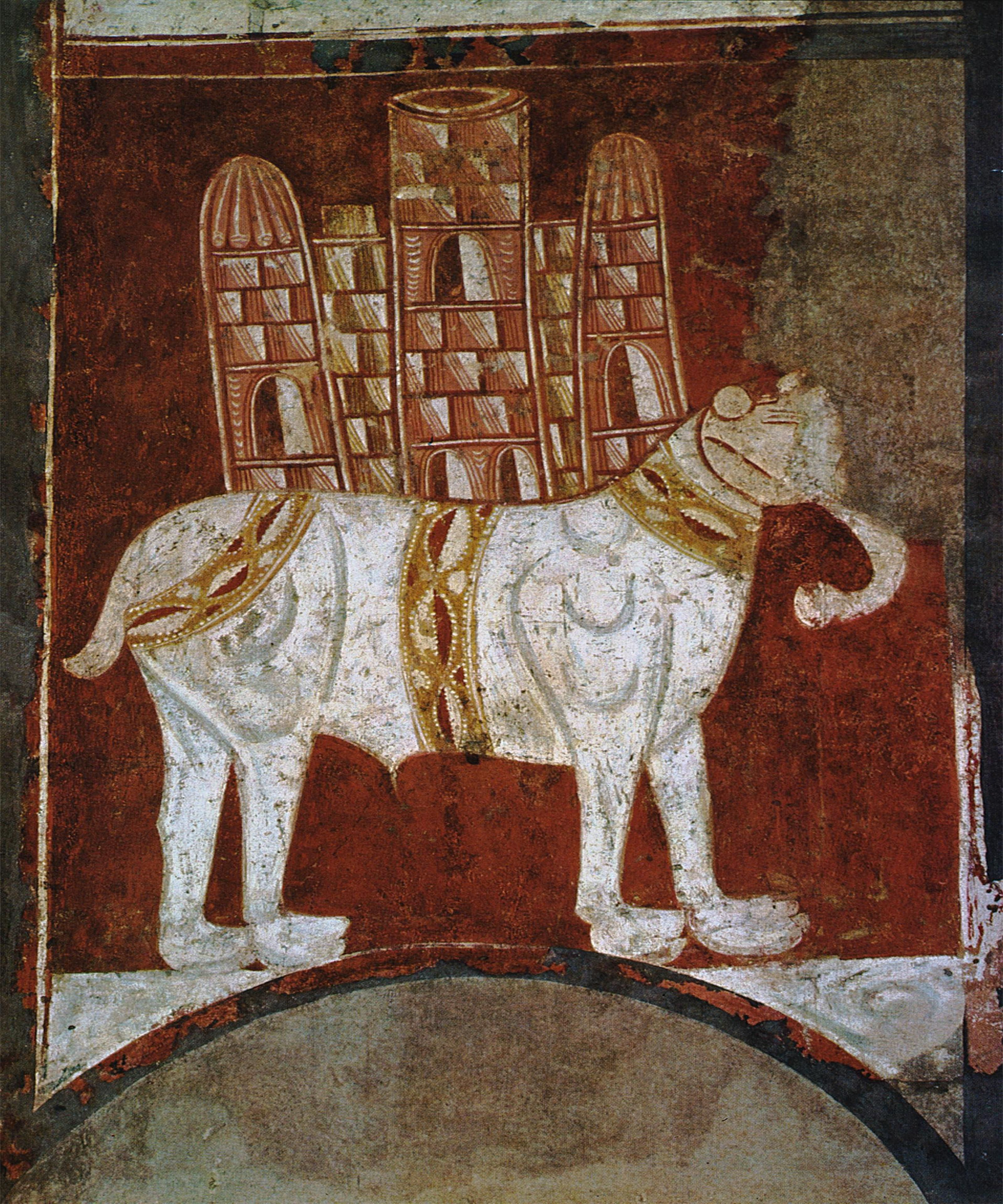
A twelfth century depiction of a war elephant from Spain

In 797 Isaac, along with two other diplomats (Lantfroi and Sigismond) were sent to Harun al-Rashid, the fifth Abbasid Caliph, in Baghdad. He is described as a polyglot and having extensive connections throughout the Jewish communities of the Diaspora. The diplomatic mission was highly rewarding and was important in fortifying Abbasid–Carolingian relations. The Caliph gave Charlemagne a gift of an Asian elephant named Abul-Abbas. Isaac, the only surviving member of the diplomatic group, was sent back with the elephant. The two began the trek back by following the Egyptian coast into Ifriqiya (modern Algeria and Tunisia). Possibly with the help of Emir Ibrahim I ibn al-Aghlab, Isaac set sail with Abul-Abbas from the city of Kairouan and traveled the remaining miles to Europe via the Mediterranean Sea. They landed in Genoa in October 801. The two spent the winter in Vercelli, and in the spring they started the march over the Alps to the Emperor's residence in Aachen, arriving on 1 July, 802. Abul-Abbas was exhibited on various occasions when the court was assembled, and was eventually housed in Augsburg in what is now southern Bavaria.
