= Abul-Abbas =

Elephant sent as a gift from Harun al-Rashid to Charlemagne

- Species: Asian elephant
- Sex: Male
- Born: c. 770s or 780s (Note: Birth date based on the average male Asian elephant maturity age as contemporary documents suggest Abul-Abbas was fully grown when he arrived in Europe.); Abbasid Caliphate (possibly)
- Died: 810 (aged around 30–40) likely near Münster or Wesel, Germany

Abul-Abbas (c. 770s or 780s – 810) was an Asian elephant brought back to the Carolingian emperor Charlemagne by his diplomat Isaac the Jew. The gift was from the Abbasid caliph Harun al-Rashid and symbolizes the beginning of Abbasid–Carolingian relations. The elephant's name and events from his life are recorded in the Carolingian Annales regni Francorum, (Note: The Annales regni francorum Anno 802 gives "venit Isaac cum elefanto et ceteris muniberus, quae a rege Persarum missa sunt, et Aquisgrani omnia imperatori detulit; nomen elefanti erat Abul Abaz". Harun al Rashid is referred to as either the king of the Persians (ibid 801:116 "rex Persarum") or of the Saracenes (ibid 810:113 "ubi dum aliquot dies moraretur, elefant ille, quem ei Aaron rex Sarracenorum miserat, subita morte periit") and he is mentioned in Einhard's Vita Karoli Magni. (Note: Einhard refers to the elephant as the only one Harun al Rashid had ("quem tunc solem habetat"), which is regarded an invention.) However, no references to the gift or to interactions with Charlemagne have been found in Abbasid records.

== Contemporary accounts ==
=== From the Orient to Europe ===
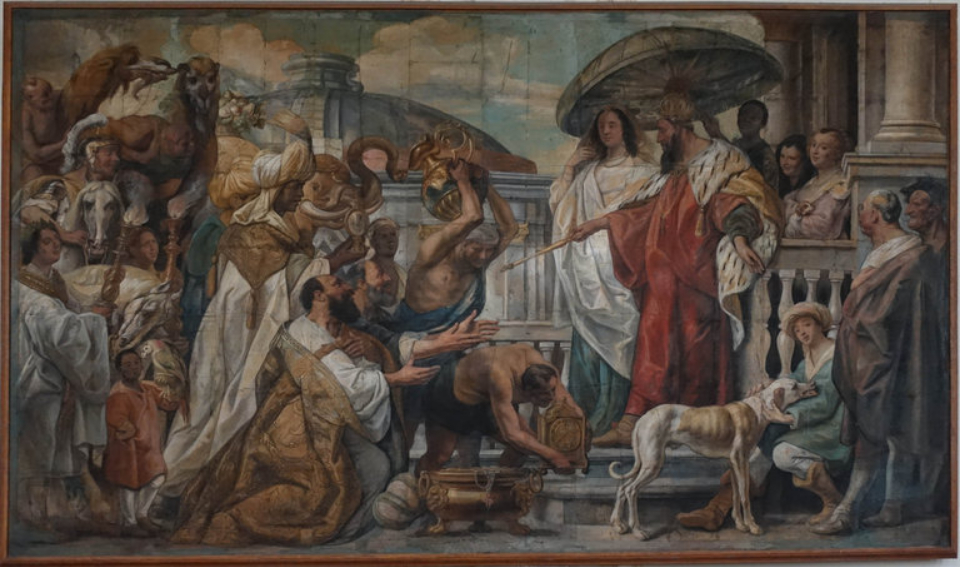
Diplomatic gifts of Harun al-Rashid for Charlemagne, European painting by Jacob Jordaens

Abul-Abbas was probably born during the 770s or 780s (based on the average age of Asian elephant maturity) and was brought from Baghdad, the capital city of the Abbasid Caliphate, by Charlemagne's diplomat Isaac the Jew, who along with two other emissaries, Lantfrid and Sigimund, had been sent to the caliph on Charlemagne's orders. That the only surviving member of the group of three, Isaac, was being sent back with the elephant was heralded as advance news to Charlemagne from two emissaries he met in 801: one was sent by the caliph Harun al-Rashid himself, another by Abraham (Ibrahim ibn al-Aghlab), who was governor of Africa. Charlemagne then ordered a man to Liguria (the province around Genoa) to commission a fleet of ships to carry the elephant and other goods.

Researchers have speculated on Isaac and the elephant's route through Africa: Isaac and the elephant began the trek back by following the Egyptian coast into Ifriqiya, ruled by Ibrahim ibn al-Aghlab who had bought the land from al-Rashid for 40,000 dinars annually. Possibly with the help of Ibrahim in the capital city of Kairouan (now in Tunisia), Isaac set sail from port (possibly Carthage, now in Tunisia) with Abul-Abbas and traveled the remaining distance to Europe via the Mediterranean Sea.

At any rate, the strict reading of the historic text Annales regni Francorum is that "Isaac the Jew returned from Africa with the elephant" (Isaac Iudeus de Africa cum elefanto) and landed in Porto Venere (near Genoa) in October 801. The two spent the winter in Vercelli, and in the spring they started the march over the Alps to the Emperor's residence in Aachen, arriving on 20 July 802. Abul Abbas was a full-grown adult elephant.

=== Death ===
In the year 810, Charlemagne left his palace and mounted a campaign intending to engage with King Gudfred of Denmark and his fleet that invaded and plundered Friesland. Charlemagne had crossed the Rhine River and tarried at a place called "Lippeham" awaiting troops for three days, when his elephant suddenly died. On the tacit assumption that Charlemagne was with Abul-Abbas when the elephant died, some modern commentators venture that the beast had been brought to serve as a war elephant.

=== Place of death ===
The location of "Lippeham" is a matter of conjecture, but has been placed at the "mouth of the Lippe River" (its confluence with the Rhine), in other words, somewhere near the city of Wesel. The claim dates at least as far back as 1746, (or 1735) when J. H. Nünning (Nunningus) and a colleague had published a notice that "Lippeham" was to be identified with Wesel; and that a colossal bone unearthed from the area, in the possession of their affiliated museum, was plausibly a part of the remains of the elephant Abul-Abbas. Another gigantic bone was found in the Lippe River among a catch of fish in the herrschaft of Gartrop in early 1750, and it too was claimed to be a piece of Abul-Abbas.

One detractor to the claim is Richard Hodges who places it in Lüneburg Heath, which is nowhere near the Rhine.

== Modern embellished accounts ==
=== Details of exhibition and death ===
The Annales regni Francorum contain only short reports about the transport of Abul-Abbas (801), his delivery to the Emperor (802) and his death (810). But modern writers have given various embellished accounts. Some indicate that when Abul-Abbas arrived, he was marched through various towns in Germany to the astonishment of onlookers, that he was shown in "Speyer, Strassburg, Verdun, Augsburg, and Paderborn" as ostentatious display of the emperor's might, and was eventually housed in Augsburg in what is now southern Bavaria.

Some added details about the elephant's death, stating he was in his forties and already suffering from rheumatism when he accompanied Charlemagne in the campaign across the Rhine heading to Friesland. According to these sources, in a spell of "cool rainy weather", Abul-Abbas developed a case of pneumonia. His keepers were able to transport the beast as far as Münster, where he collapsed and died.

=== White elephant ===
Some modern works indicate that Abul-Abbas was albino – literally a white elephant – but the basis for the claim is wanting. An early example claiming that Abul-Abbas was a "white elephant" occurs in a title authored by Willis Mason West (1902). In 1971, Peter Munz wrote a book intended for popular readership which repeated the same "white elephant" claim, but a reviewer flagged this as a "slip" given there was "no evidence" known to him to substantiate it. Mention of "white elephant" also misleadingly occurs in the title of the published catalog from the Aachen exhibition of 2003: Ex oriente : Isaak und der weisse Elefant, however, in this publication is a contributing article by Grewe and Pohle that appends a question mark on it: "Among the famous gifts to Charlemagne was a (white?) elephant".

=== Abul-Abbas' species ===
The elephant in Paris, BnF lat. 2195

A number of authors assert that Abul-Abbas was an Indian elephant, though others cast this as an open question with the African elephant being a distinct possibility. (Note: "We know very little about the elephant; some accounts say it was African, others an Indian beast.") No primary source identifies his species directly.

Arguments for Abul-Abbas having been an Indian elephant include that Abbasid sources such as al-Jahiz and al-Masudi record a belief that African elephants were not tamable. Another clue comes from the Irish monk Dicuil who mentions Abul-Abbas in his description of India in his geographic work De mensura orbis terrae ("Concerning the Measurement of the World") in 825. (Note: De mensura orbis terrae, 7.35: "But the same Iulius in speaking of Germany and its islands makes one mistake about elephants when he says that the elephant never lies down, for he certainly does lie down like an ox, as the people at large of the Frankish kingdom saw the elephant at the time of Emperor Charles...." ("Sed idem Julius nuntiando de Germania insulisque eius unum de elephantibus mentiens falso loquitur dicens, elephantem numquam iacere, dum ille sicut bos certissime iacet, ut populi communiter regni Francorum elephantem in tempore imperatoris Karoli viderunt....")) An inhabited initial B from a copy of Cassiodorus' Commentary on the Psalms made at the Abbey of Saint-Denis in the first quarter of the ninth century (now Paris, BnF lat. 2195) incorporates an elephant's head. The realistic portrayal of an Asian elephant suggests that the artist had seen Abul-Abbas.

Evidence put forward for Abul-Abbas having been an African elephant includes the route by which he arrived in Europe, which was via Tunisia. Also, a Carolingian plaque survives which was manufactured from ivory from an African elephant and was from a contemporary source. Ivory was widely used in Carolingian art, but most of this material was re-purposed from Roman sources. This particular plaque, a depiction of the Virgin Mary is too large to have come from the tusk of an Indian elephant, measuring 22 cm (8.7 in) along its longest side. Radio-carbon dating shows that the ivory in the plaque is not of ancient origin. For Carolingian artists to have access to new ivory is so unusual that it makes Abul-Abbas a possible source of the material.

A short story by the German-New Zealand author Norman Franke tells the biography of the elephant from his own point of view.

== See also ==
- Abbasid–Carolingian alliance
- History of elephants in Europe
- List of individual elephants
- War elephant
