= Makhir of Narbonne =

8th-century French rabbi

Makhir ben Yehudah Zakkai of Narbonne or Makhir ben Habibai of Narbonne or Natronai ben Habibi (725–765 or 793) was a rabbi and scholar and, later, the supposed leader of the Jews of Narbonne, Septimania (now Occitania, the region of France bordering the Mediterranean Sea).

Map of Septimania in 537

== Writings by Abraham ibn Daud ==
According to a tradition preserved by Abraham ibn Daud in his Sefer ha-Qabbalah, written about 1161, Makhir was a descendant of the Davidic line. Ibn Daud wrote:

Then King Charles sent to the King of Baghdad requesting that he dispatch one of his Jews of the seed of royalty of the House of David. He hearkened and sent him one from there, a magnate and sage, Rabbi Makhir by name. And [Charles] settled him in Narbonne, the capital city, and planted him there, and gave him a great possession there at the time he captured it from the Ishmaelites [Arabs]. And he [Makhir] took to wife a woman from among the magnates of the town; *...* and the King made him a nobleman and designed, out of love for [Makhir], good statutes for the benefit of all the Jews dwelling in the city, as is written and sealed in a Latin charter; and the seal of the King therein [bears] his name Carolus; and it is in their possession at the present time. The Prince Makhir became chieftain there. He and his descendants were close [inter-related] with the King and all his descendants.

Whether it is a legend or not, the relation between Makhir and Charles 'Charlemagne' is legendary, the more famous king substituting for his father Pepin the Short, first Carolingian king of the Franks, who in order to enlist the Jews of Narbonne in his efforts to keep the Umayyad Caliphate at bay, granted wide-ranging powers in return for the surrender of Moorish Narbonne to him in 759. The Chronicle of Aniane and the Chronicle of Moissac both attribute this action to the Goth leaders of Narbonne, rising up and massacring the Muslim garrison. Pepin, with his sons Carloman and Charles 'Charlemagne', redeemed this pledge in 768, granting to Makhir and his heirs extensive lands, an act that called forth an unavailing protest from Pope Stephen III. In 791 Charlemagne confirmed the status of the Jewish Principate and made the title of Nasi permanent.

The Makhir family enjoyed many privileges for centuries, and its members bore the title of nasi. (Note: The exact translation of nasi is unclear, but its meaning was 'leader [of the Jews]' and it is often translated as 'prince'.)) Benjamin of Tudela, who visited Narbonne in 1165, speaks of the exalted position occupied by the descendants of Makhir, and the "Royal Letters" of 1364 also record the existence of a rex Iudaeorum (King of the Jews) at Narbonne. The place of residence of the Makhir family at Narbonne was designated in official documents as "Cortada Regis Judæorum".

== Bnei Makhir and Carolingian dynasty ==
Arthur Zuckerman maintains that Makhir was identical with Natronai ben Habibi, an exilarch who was deposed and exiled from Lower Mesopotamia in a dispute between two branches of the Bostanai family in the late eighth century. Zuckerman further identified Makhir (Natronai) with a Maghario, Count of Narbonne (actually viscount), and in turn with an Aymeri de Narbonne, who lived in the 12th century but whom epic poetry makes father of William of Gellone (died 813). This William was the subject of at least six major epic poems composed before the era of the Crusades, including Willehalm by Wolfram von Eschenbach, (who also, in another work, was a chronicler of the search for the Holy Grail).

The historical William, i. e. William of Gellone, Count of Toulouse led Frankish forces at the fall of Barcelona in 803. The account of the campaign in Ermoldus Nigellus's Latin poem dates the events, as Zuckerman says, according to the Jewish calendar and portrays William, again according to Zuckerman's interpretation, as an observant Jew. Count William was actually the son of the Frankish Count Theoderic and in 806 became a monk. In another identification, Zuckerman concludes that Theoderic (Todros) was none other than Makhir, and that the well-documented descendants of Theoderic embodied a dynasty of Franco-Judeic kings of Narbonne, representing the union of the lineage of the exilarchs with Carolingians.

However, this underlying chain of identifications has been shown to be flawed, a negative opinion shared by other scholars, while the broader suggestions of a Jewish principality in Occitano-Romance-speaking regions (now southern France) have likewise been disputed. Zuckerman's use of sources and analytical approach has also been criticized.

== See also ==
- Descent from antiquity
- History of the Jews in France
- Hachmei Provence
- Exilarch
