= Aldana (noblewoman) =

Auda, Aida, Alda, Aldana or Adalne (c. 722 – before 755?) was wife of Frankish nobleman Thierry IV, count of Autun and mother of Saint William of Gellone.

== Marriage and children ==
She was married to Thierry, perhaps a nephew, grandson or grand-nephew of Bertrada of Prüm, in 742 and in 750. From this marriage were born:

- Theodoen (died before 826), count of Autun, mentioned in 804, whose son Thierry was active in the 810s.
- Adalhelm
- William, count of Toulouse and founder of the Abbey of Gellone.
- Abba and Berta, mentioned as nuns in 804. One of them was probably married to a Nibelungid, Childebrand II or Nibelung II.

== Debated Parentage ==
There are no direct primary sources claiming Auda to be a daughter of Charles Martel and secondary evidence is scarce. Sources from Aquitaine name one of her sisters as “Hiltrudis,” a name shared by one of Charles Martel's daughters. Additionally, scholars have noted that Auda's son, William of Gellone, named one of his sons “Bernard,” a Carolingian name. Auda being a daughter of Charles Martel could explain how a Carolingian name became accepted by the family. However, scholar Constance Brittain Bouchard argues that such evidence is weak and circumstantial at best.
