= Offa's imitation dinar =

Anglo-Saxon coin

Abbasid Influence in Anglo-Saxon England
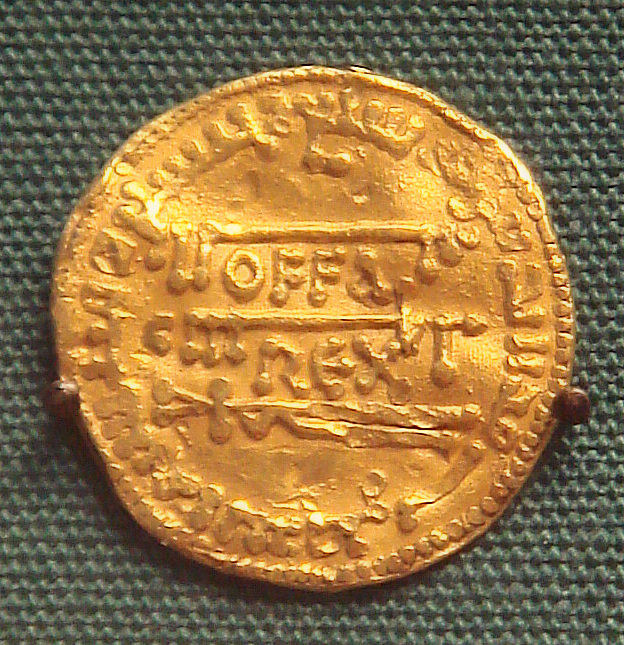
- Gold dinar-style coin of Offa of Mercia, imitating an Abbasid dinar
- Date: 757 – 796 AD (influence continued until 1088 AD)
- Location: Kingdom of Mercia, England (present-day England)
- Cause: Cultural and economic contact via trade, diplomacy, and imitation of Islamic coinage

In the late 8th century, King Offa of Mercia issued a coin inspired by an Abbasid gold dinar. This coinage reflects early contact between Anglo-Saxon England and the Islamic world. The presence of Islamic silver coins (dirhams) in England further supports this interaction during the period.

Offa's coinage reforms in the late 8th century included the introduction of a “heavy” silver penny with standardized weight and design, likely influenced by contemporaneous monetary reforms in the Frankish Empire under Charlemagne.

Among this reforms included a gold coin closely imitating an Abbasid dinar from AH 157 (AD 773–4), inscribed with "Offa Rex" in Latin, over Arabic script.

This coin indicates awareness of Islamic currency and suggests early cultural and economic contact between Anglo-Saxon England and the Abbasid Caliphate.

Some Arabic historical sources claim that Offa may have converted to Islam following interactions with Muslim merchants or envoys, though these accounts remain controversial and are not widely accepted in Western scholarship.
