= Thierry IV =

Frankish noble (flourished c. 770–793)

Theoderic IV (fl. c. 770–793, French: Thierry IV) was a Frankish noble and royal missus.

Theoderic's parentage is not directly attested. Speculation about how his grandson Bernard of Septimania came to be described as sharing the blood of the Carolingian rulers has led to hypotheses regarding Theuderic's ancestry. One possible route has involved a relationship to Charlemagne's maternal great-grandmother, Bertrada of Prüm. A donation she executed was witnessed first by her only son, Charibert, and then by Bernarius, Chrodlanda and Theoderic. Bernarius and Chrodlanda seem to match the Guarnarius and Rotlindis who appear in a 751 document. Based on their prominence in this donation, it has been suggested that Chrodlanda/Rotlindis was either daughter or sister of Bertrada. The last of the witnesses of Bertrada of Prüm's donation, Theoderic, is suggested either to be one and the same with Thierry, or else his father.

A second possible avenue for a relationship comes via Theoderic's wife, Aldana, whose parentage is not directly documented but who had known sisters, Hiltrudis and Landrada. Hiltrudis was the name of a documented daughter of Charles Martel and sister of Pepin III, while a medieval saint's vita of uncertain reliability also gives Martel a daughter Landrada, leading to the suggestion that Aldana was likewise his daughter. The two possible relationships to the Carolingians need not be viewed as mutually exclusive.

== Children ==
Theoderic and Aldana had:

- William of Gellone (755 – 28 May 812/814)
- Theodino, father of a Theoderic (fl. 815–819)
- Adalhelm of Autun
- Albana
- Bertana

== Sources ==
- Bouchard, Constance Brittain (2001). Those of My Blood: Creating Noble Families in Medieval Francia. University of Pennsylvania Press.
