= Kalonymus ben Todros =

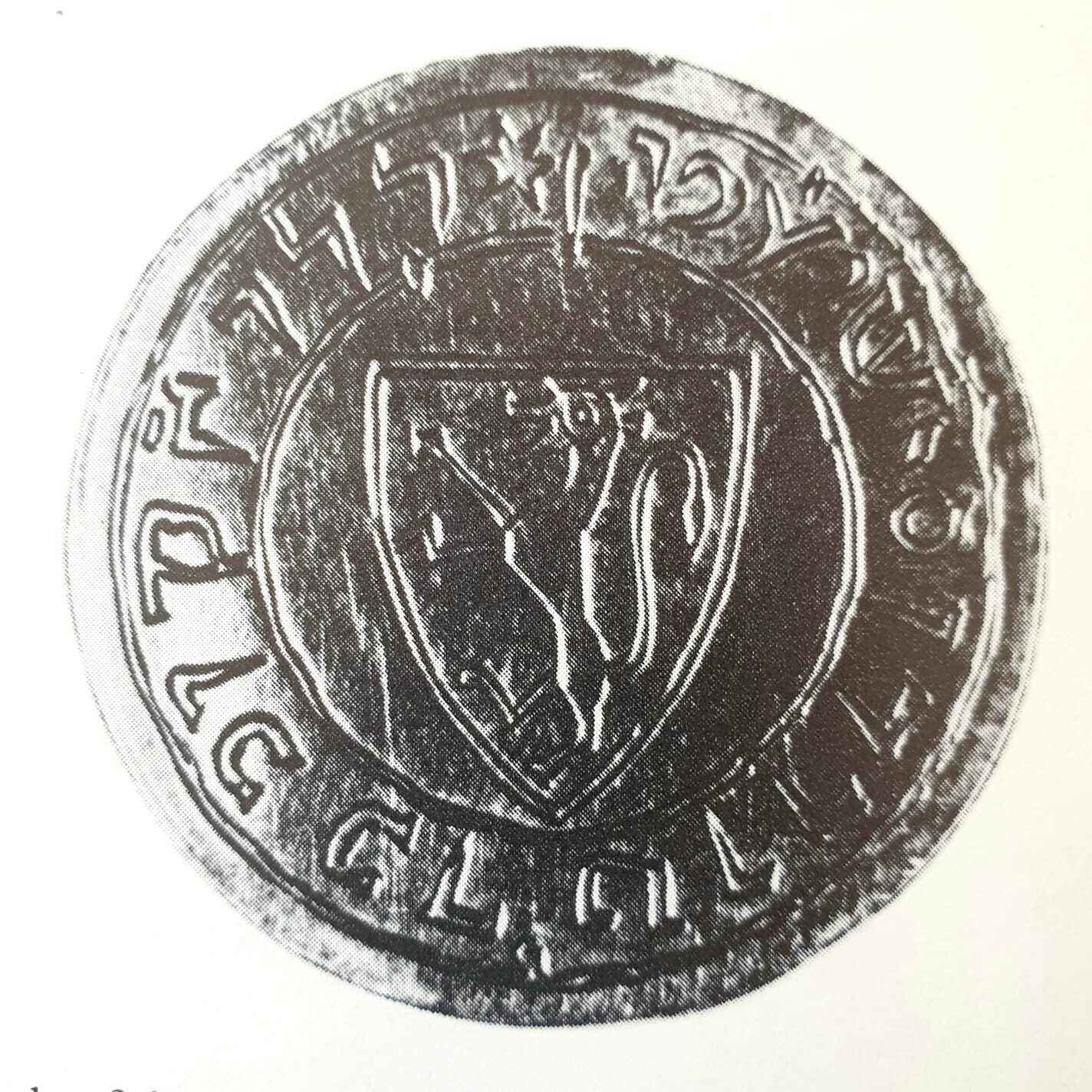
Seal of Nasi Kalonymos ben Todros, showing the royal lion of Judah

Kalonymus ben Todros (Hebrew: קלונימוס בן טודרוס) (d. ca. 1194) was a hakham of Provence who flourished at Narbonne in the second half of the twelfth century. He bore the title Nasi and was the leader of the community when Benjamin of Tudela visited Narbonne in 1165. He and his cousin Levi ben Moses were joint leaders at a later time.

From certain letters of Sheshet Benveniste to Kalonymus, it seems probable that he died in 1194. The letters are contained in a manuscript of the historian Joseph ha-Kohen. Heinrich Gross believed that Kalonymus is identical with Clarimoscus filius Tauroscii who was mentioned in a deed of conveyance of 1195 reproduced by Gustave Saige.

== Bibliography ==
- Henri Gross, Gallia Judaica. Paris: Libraire Léopold Cerf, 1897, pp. 406–07
- Gustave Saige, Les Juifs du Languedoc. Paris: Libraire des Archives Nationales et de la Société de l'École des Chartes, 1887, p. 70
- Jean Régné, Étude sur la condition des Juifs de Narbonne du Ve au XIVe siècle (suite). In: Revue des études juives, tome 62, n°123, juillet-septembre 1911. pp. 1-27.
