= Gellone =

Gellone may refer to:

- Gellone Abbey, located in the village of the same name, now Saint-Guilhem-le-Désert, Hérault, France
- Gellone river, a river in Saint-Guilhem-le-Désert, Hérault, France
- William of Gellone (755-812/4), otherwise Saint Guilhem, the second Count of Toulouse
