= Renato Nicolodi =

Belgian painter and sculptor

Renato Nicolodi is a Belgian painter and sculptor.

== Biography ==
Nicolodi studied from 1999 at the Sint-Lukas art school in Brussels, where he graduated in painting in 2003. He continued his studies at the Higher Institute of Fine Arts in Ghent, where he graduated in 2007. Today, he works in Roosdaal and Denderleeuw.

After graduating, Nicolodi's interest shifted from painting to sculptural installations: initially concrete casts of the walls of bunkers that were part of the Atlantic Wall; later, small constructions in concrete, brass, wood and other materials.

== Work ==
As described by art critics, Nicolodi's sculptures and paintings refer to an archetypal, architectural imagery. Corridors and stairs lead to a black central void, which can only be entered mentally, and in which the viewer can reflect his or her own thoughts. The titles of the works, often referring to concepts from architecture, give the viewer a certain direction.

Artists such as Andrea Palladio, Étienne-Louis Boullée or Giorgio de Chirico have more than once been associated with Nicolodi's work; he himself cites Paul Virilio, Dante Alighieri and Stanley Kubrick as influences. Such sculptures can be seen permanently in, among others, the Princess Josephine Charlotte Park in Lokeren (as a tribute to health care and volunteers); in the Plinius Park in Tongeren; at the site of the former Gontrode airfield in Melle and at the Waterschei cemetery in Genk.

Temporary sculptures were on display in Tilburg (Lustwarande), London (Frieze Sculpture Park), and Bruges – as part of the Triennial, where the work Archeron I seemed to emerge from the water, like a gateway to the world below the surface.

Participations in international exhibitions included Giudecca Art District, Venice; Musée Fenaille, Rodez; Dongdaemun Design Plaza, Seoul (as part of the Biennale for Architecture and Urbanism); H'ART Museum, Amsterdam; Lieu D'art Contemporain, Sigean; Ludwig Forum für Internationale Kunst, Aachen; the Gellone Abbey, etc. In 2012, Nicolodi provided the scenography for the exhibition Madame Grès - Sculptural Fashion at the Antwerp FOMU; in 2016 for the opera To Be Sung (Pascal Dusapin) at Flagey / La Monnaie, and in 2016-2018 for the theatre play World Without Us (Ontroerend Goed).

In 2015, Mer Paper Kunsthalle released the publication Ni Co Lo Di.
