= Saint-Guilhem-le-Désert =

Saint-Guilhem-le-Désert Sant Guilhèm dau Desèrt (Occitan)
- Commune
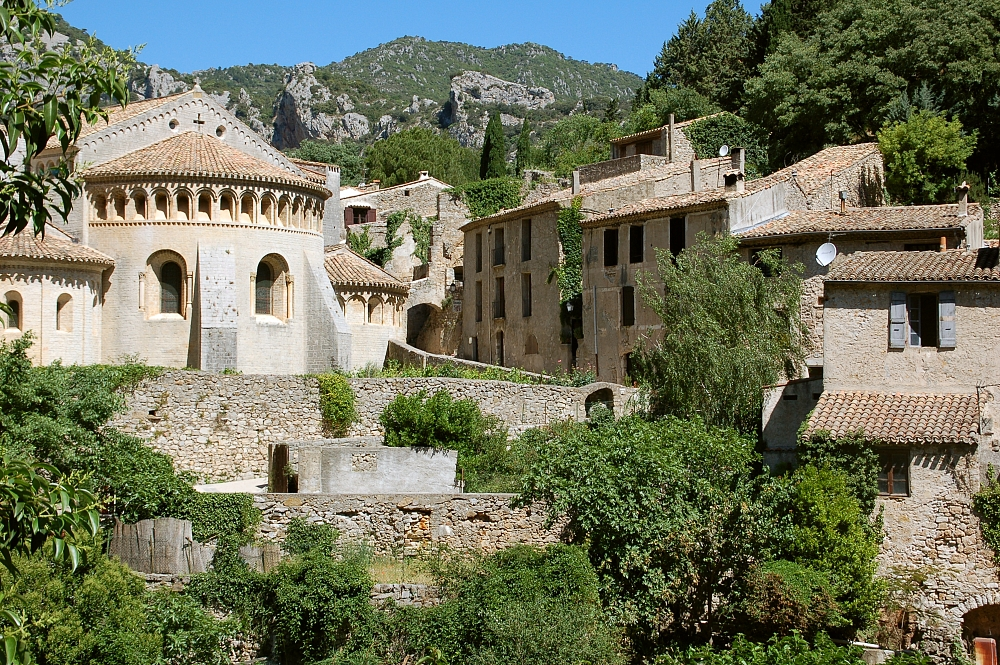
- Saint-Guilhem-le-Désert Abbey

- Coat of arms
- Location of Saint-Guilhem-le-Désert
- Location within France Location within Occitanie
- Coordinates: 43°44′05″N 3°33′02″E
- Country: France
- Region: Occitania
- Department: Hérault
- Arrondissement: Lodève
- Canton: Gignac

Government
  - Mayor (2020–2026): Robert Siegel
- Area^{1}: 38.64 km^{2} (14.92 sq mi)
- Elevation: 89 m (292 ft)
- Highest elevation: 812 m (2,664 ft)
- Lowest elevation: 54 m (177 ft)
- Population (2023): 237
  - Density: 6.13/km^{2} (15.9/sq mi)
- Time zone: UTC+01:00 (CET)
  - Summer (DST): UTC+02:00 (CEST)
- INSEE/Postal code: 34261 /34150
- ^{1} French Land Register data, which excludes lakes, ponds, glaciers > 1 km^{2} (0.386 sq mi or 247 acres) and river estuaries.

Saint-Guilhem-le-Désert (French pronunciation: [sɛ̃ ɡijɛm lə dezɛʁ] or [sɛ̃ ɡilɛm lə dezɛʁ]; Occitan: Sant Guilhèm dau Desèrt) is a commune in the Hérault department in the Occitania region in Southern France. Situated where the Gellone river's narrow valley meets the steep-sided gorge of the river Hérault, Saint-Guilhem-le-Désert is essentially a medieval village located on the Chemin de Saint-Jacques (Way of St James) pilgrim route to Santiago de Compostela.

== Geography ==
The municipality of Saint-Guilhem covers nearly 40km² in area. The town is served by two departmental roads - the D122 and D4. The nearest towns are Saint-André-de-Sangonis (12 km away) and Gignac (15 km away). Montpellier, Lodève and Ganges (which stands near the source of the Hérault) are all about 35 km away.

The town has retained a medieval appearance. It is located on the borders of the Massif Central, in the middle valley of the Hérault, north of the department of the same name. The territory of the town lies in an intramontane zone formed by the extension of the Séranne mountain and the Cellette mountain a few kilometres from the Garrigues of the plain of Languedoc.

=== Hydrography ===
The commune of Saint-Guilhem-le-Désert is drained by the river Hérault and its tributaries Verdus and Ruisseau de la Combe du Bouys.

== History ==
The village has maintained its historic state. Because of its isolation, in 806 Saint Guilhem established the monastery of Gellone here.

In 804, saint Guillaume ('saint Guilhèm' in langue d'oc), the count of Toulouse and Duke of Aquitaine, founded an abbey here at a time when the valley was virtually uninhabited, hence its appellation "desert". The abbey was called The Abbey of Gellone until Guillaume's death in 812, after which it was named The Abbey of Guillaume, and then the Abbey of Saint-Guilhem following his canonization in 1066.

The Abbey of Aniane, nearby, was founded around 782 by a relative of Guillaume.

The abbey became a very important centre of pilgrimage in the Middle Ages due to a claim that a relic of a piece of the true cross was housed here. The town developed around the abbey.

In the Middle Ages, the abbey fell within the territory of the diocese of Lodeve.

During the French Revolution, the town temporarily bore the name of Verdus-le-Désert.

== Landmarks ==
- The parish church is the former abbey church of the abbey of Gellone where we find the best preserved French organ of Jean-Pierre Cavaillé.
- The cloister of the abbey. A large part of this cloister was sold and dismantled during the French Revolution and exported to the United States, where some of it is in The Cloisters, a museum in New York.
- The town is on the route of the Santiago de Compostela pilgrimage.
- An archaeological museum is housed in the abbey's former refectory. Its collection includes sculptures from the cloister, and the sarcophagi of St. Guilhem and his sisters.
- The tower of the prisons and the castle of the Giant, elements of fortification and defence of the borough.
- The cave of Clamouse, "one of the most beautiful caves in France.

== Culture ==
In summer, the abbey of Saint-Guilhem-le-Désert and the chapel of the Penitents are the venues for concerts, especially those of the Rencontres Musicales of Saint-Guilhem-le-Désert, those of the Friends of Saint-Guilhem-le-Désert. Guilhem and the Camerata Mediterranea.

== Demographics ==
Historical population
Year	Pop.	±% p.a.
1968	229	—
1975	274	+2.60%
1982	236	−2.11%
1990	190	−2.67%
1999	245	+2.87%
2007	250	+0.25%
2012	262	+0.94%
2017	253	−0.70%
2023	237	−1.08%
Source: INSEE

== Miscellaneous ==
Saint-Guilhem-le-Désert is one of the Plus Beaux Villages de France ("The most beautiful villages of France"), and the Abbey of Gellone, along with the nearby Pont du Diable were designated UNESCO World Heritages sites in 1999.

A part of the cloister of the monastery was moved to The Cloisters museum in New York City. A new sculpture museum, containing stone works from the abbey, was dedicated on June 26, 2009. In coordination with this event, a weekend of music and a colloquium was organized in large part by the Camerata Mediterranea.

== Gallery ==
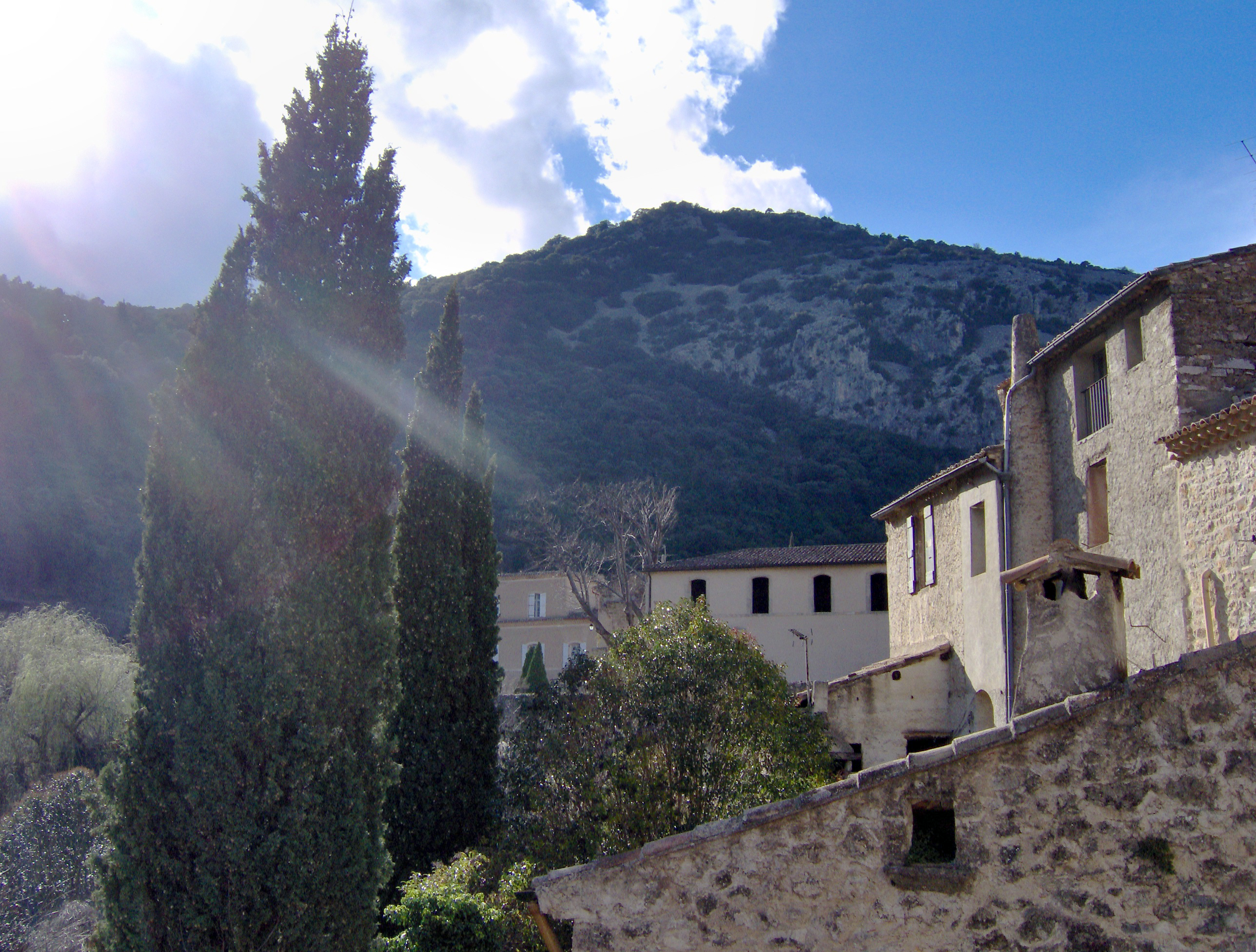

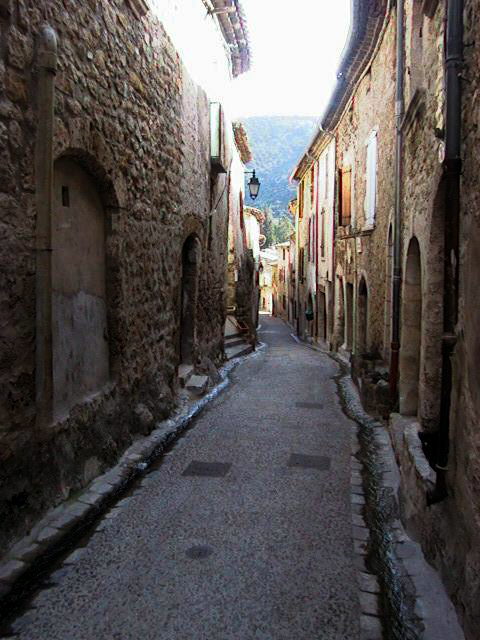

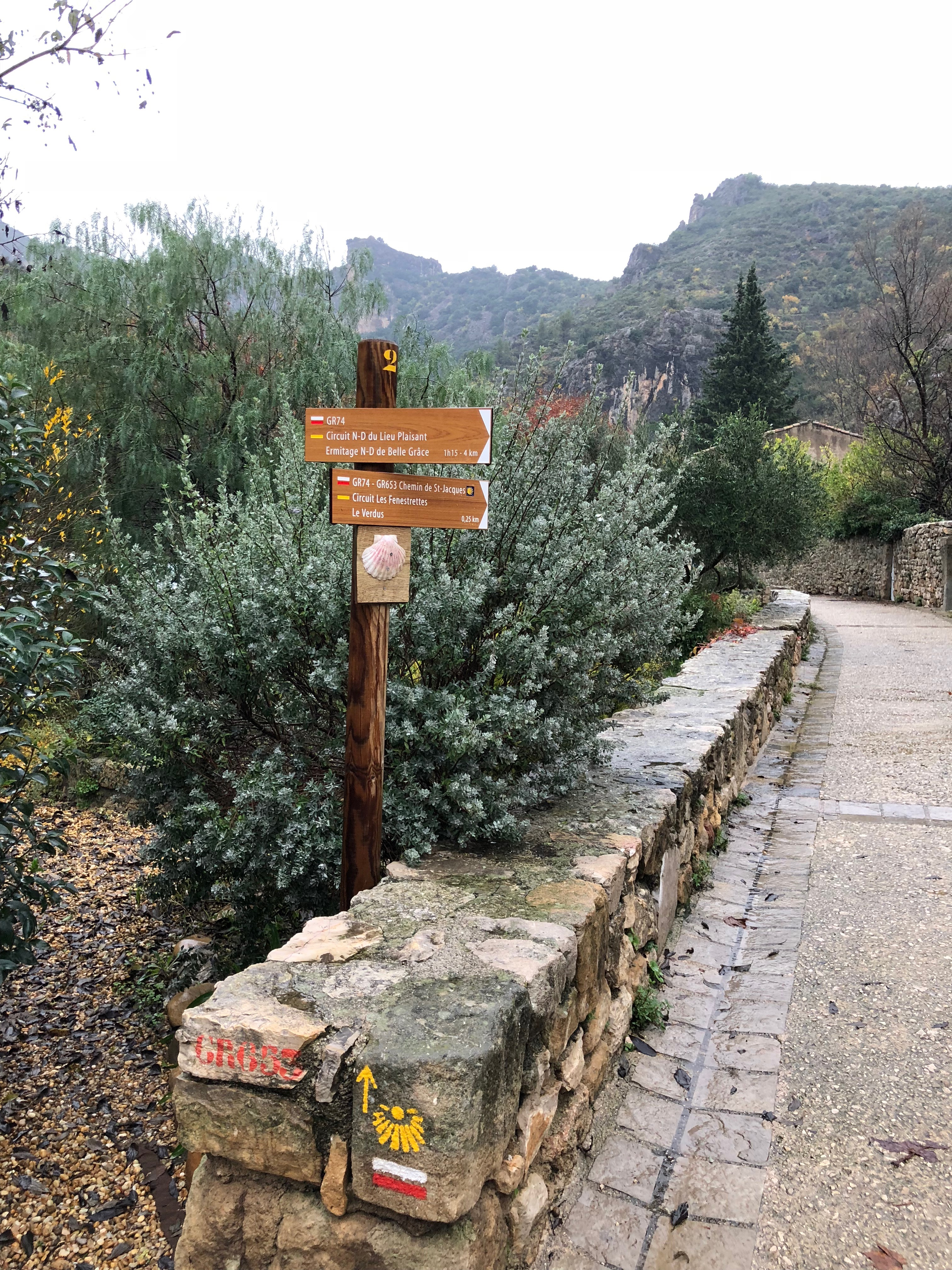
A sign marking the Way of Saint James in Saint Guilhem le Désert
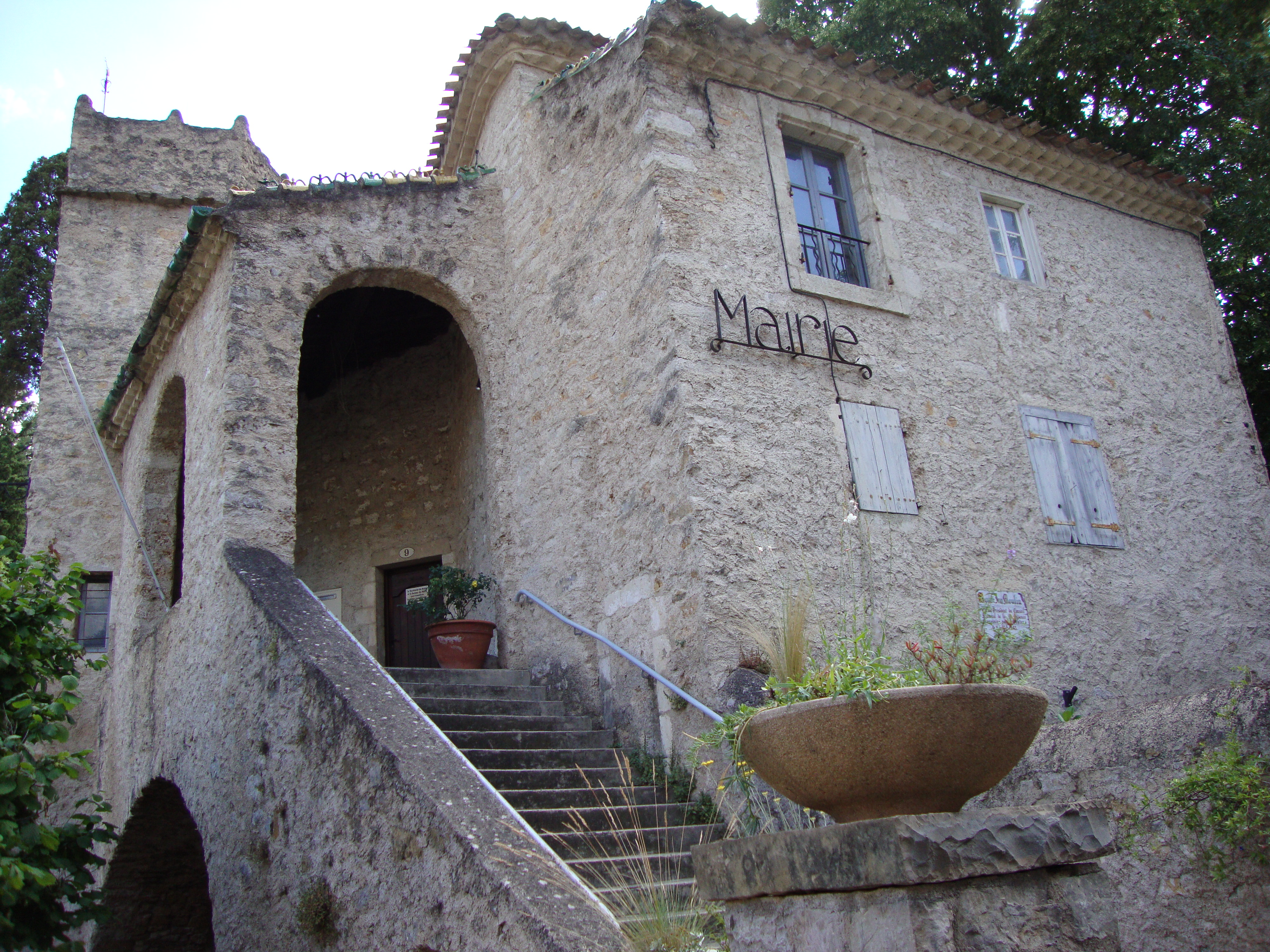
La mairie de Saint-Guilhem-le-Désert

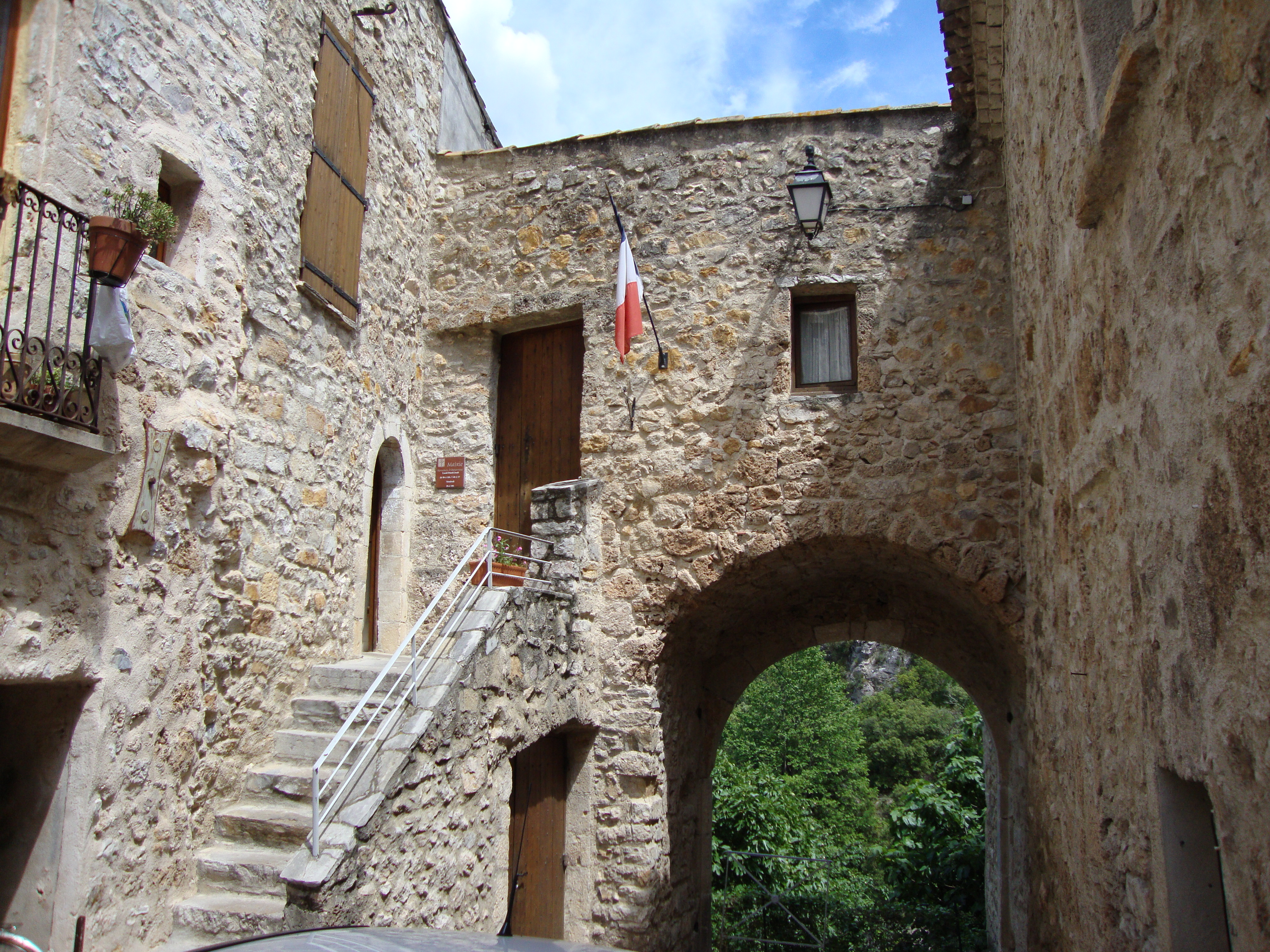
Secrétariat de la mairie

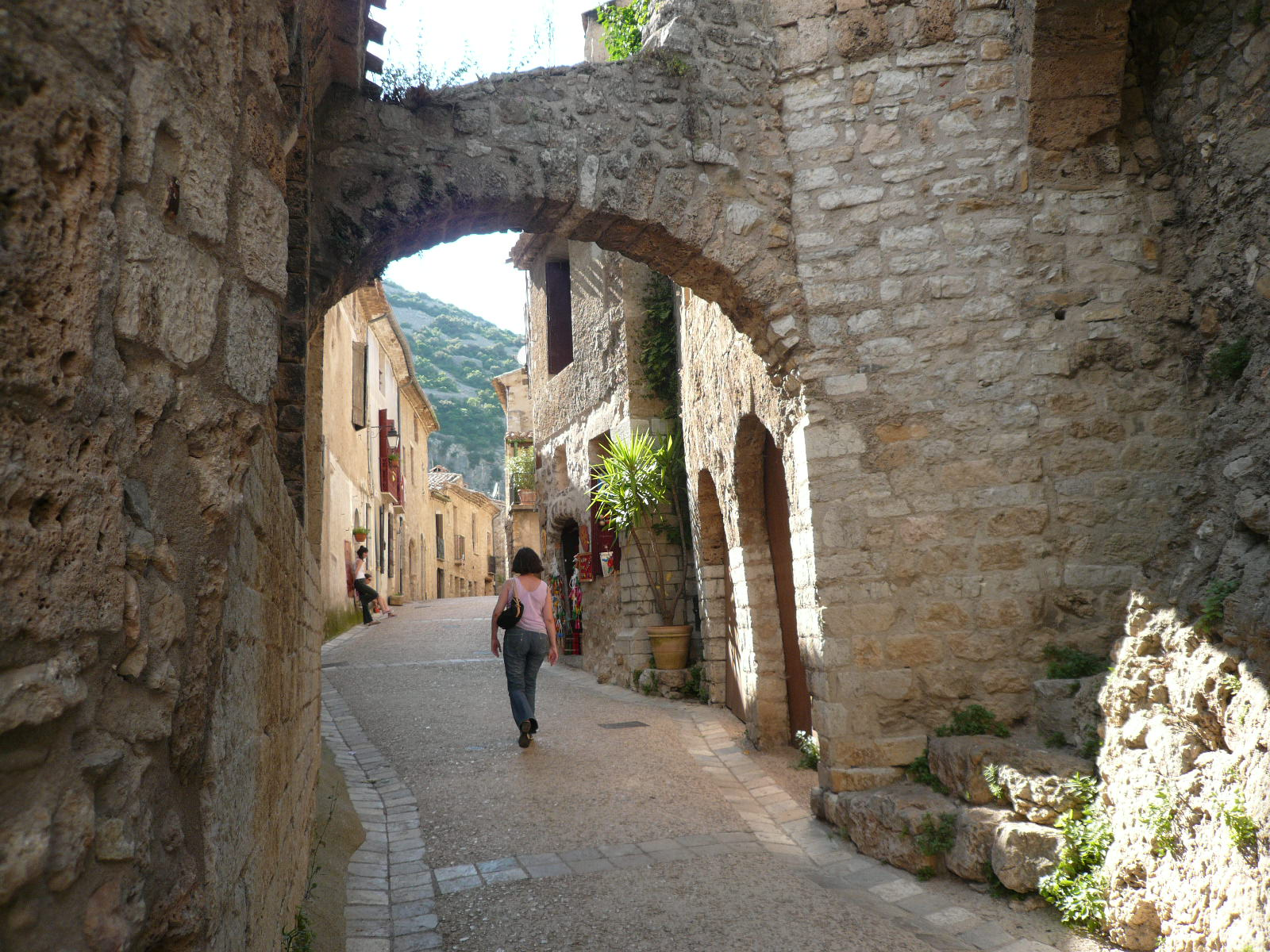
Rue du bourg de Saint-Guilhem-le-Désert

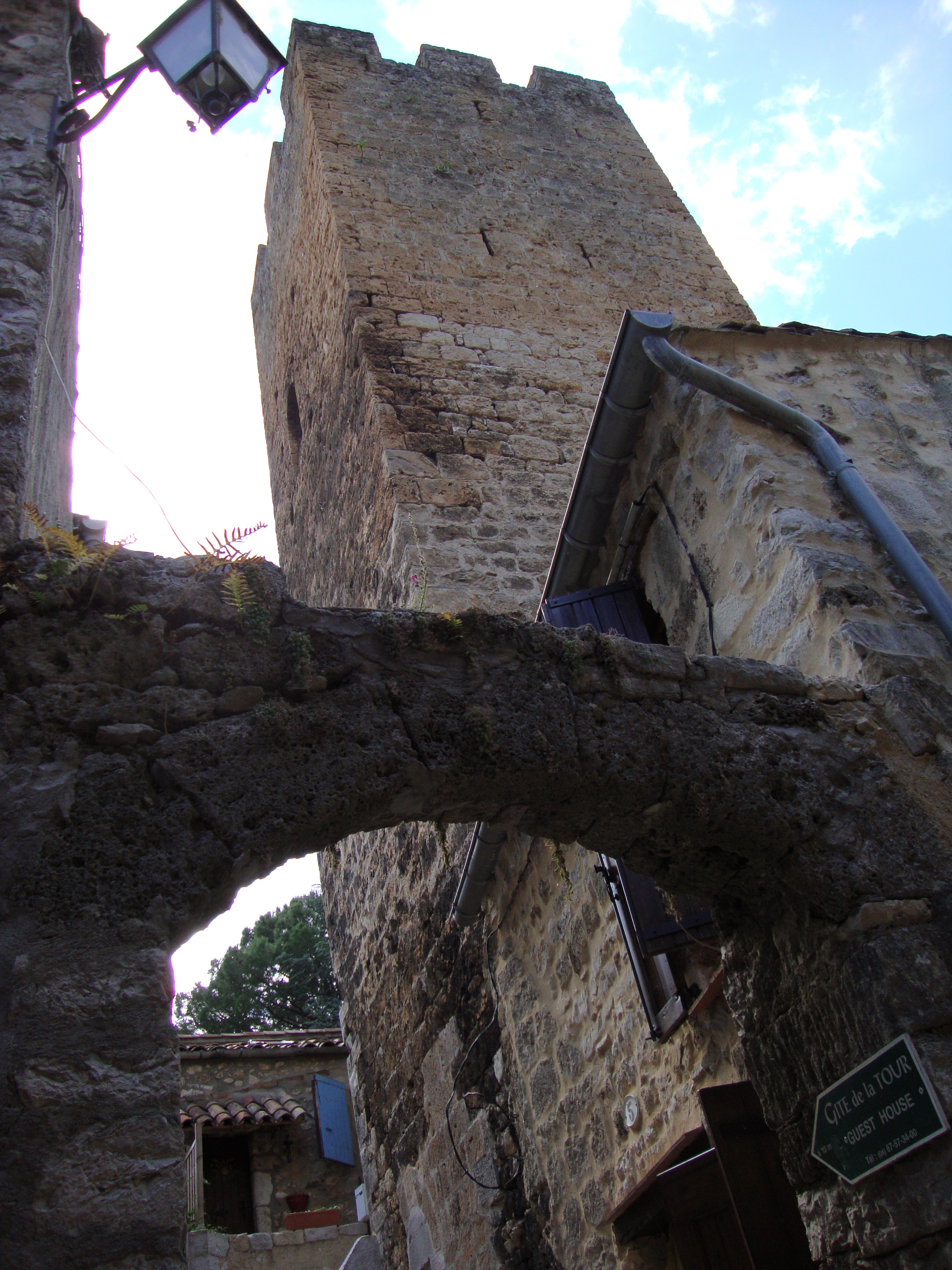
La tour des prisons

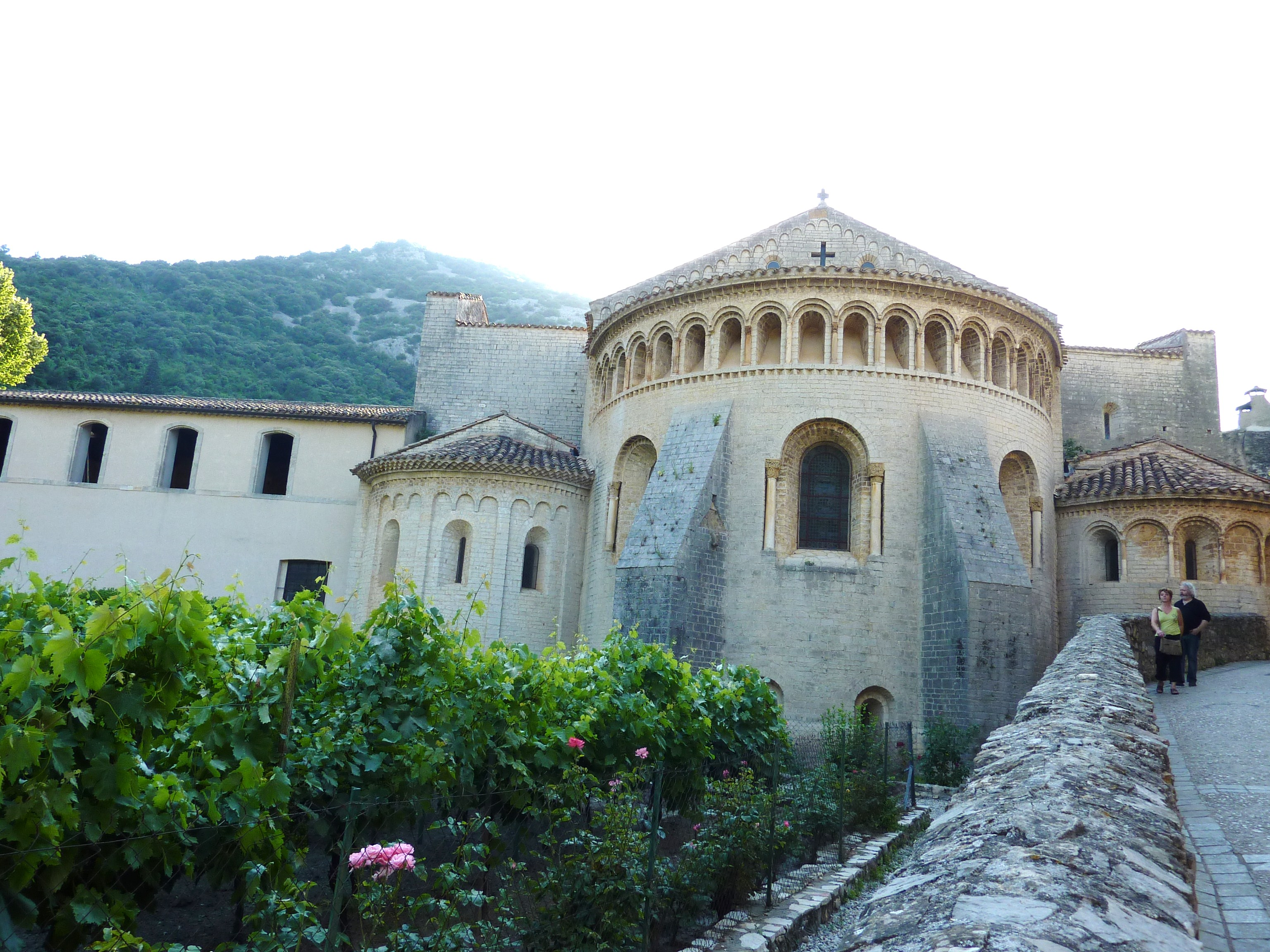
L'église abbatiale vue de l'aval

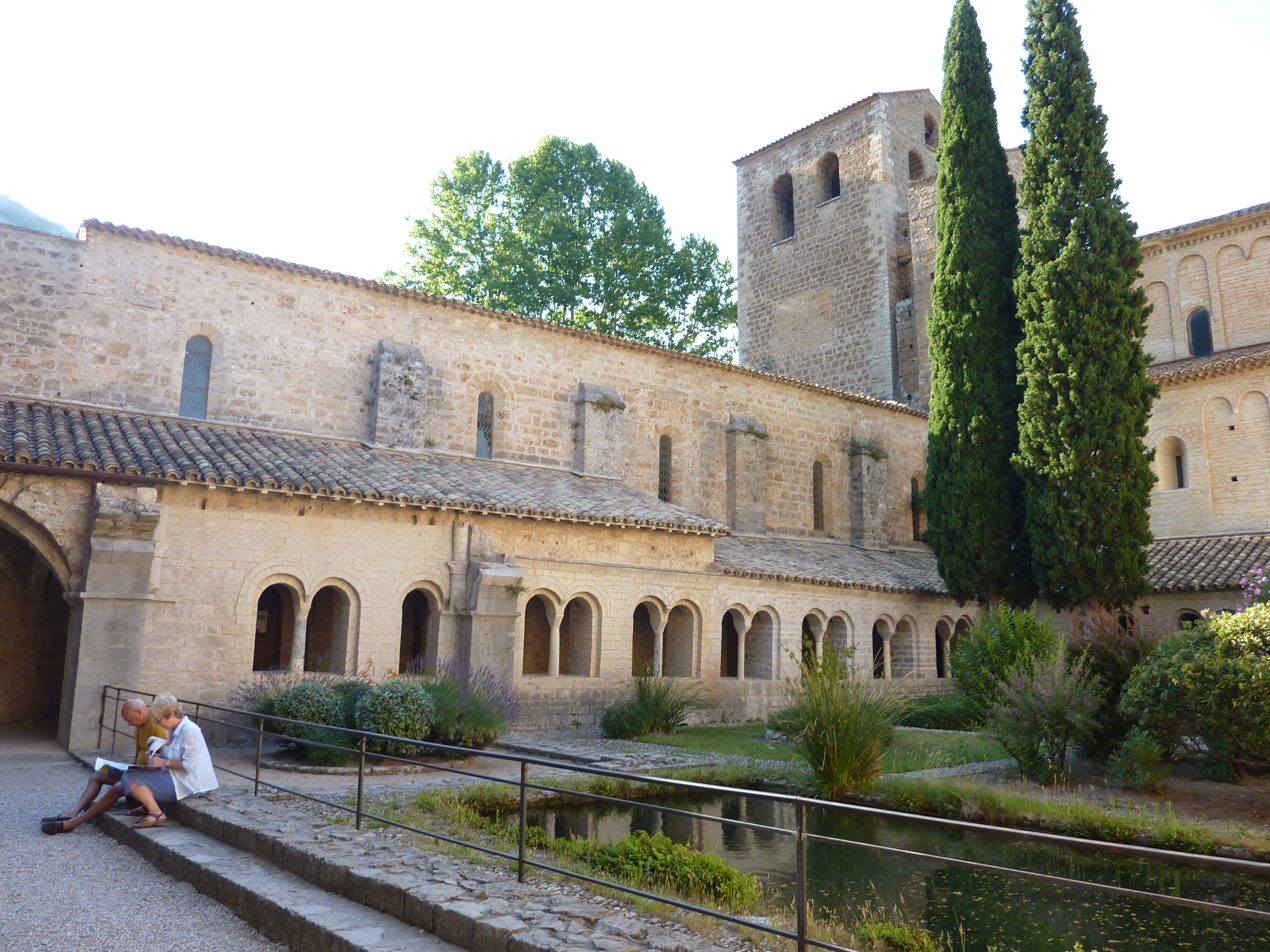
L'église abbatiale et le cloître

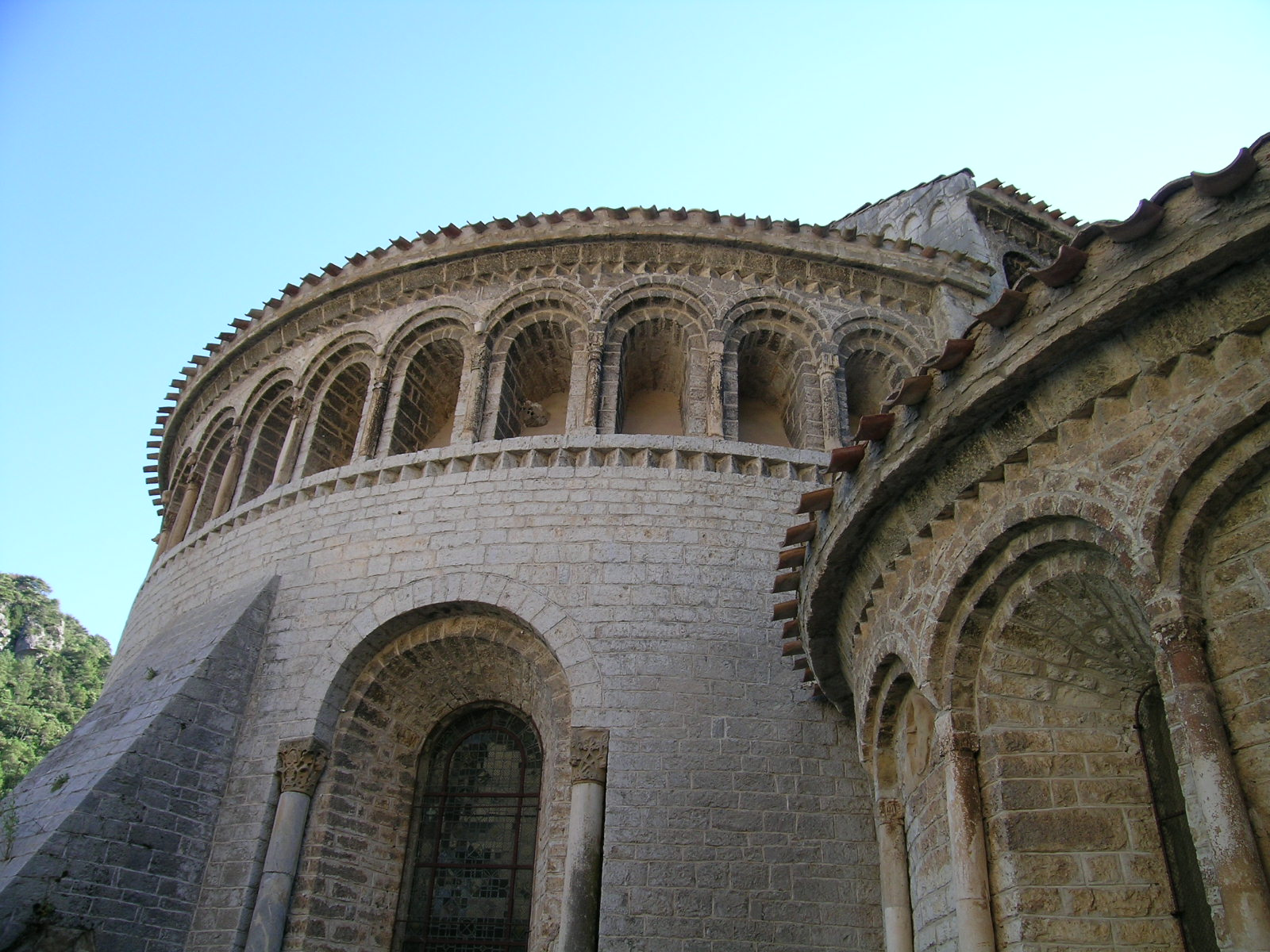
Le chevet de l'abbatiale de Saint-Guilhem

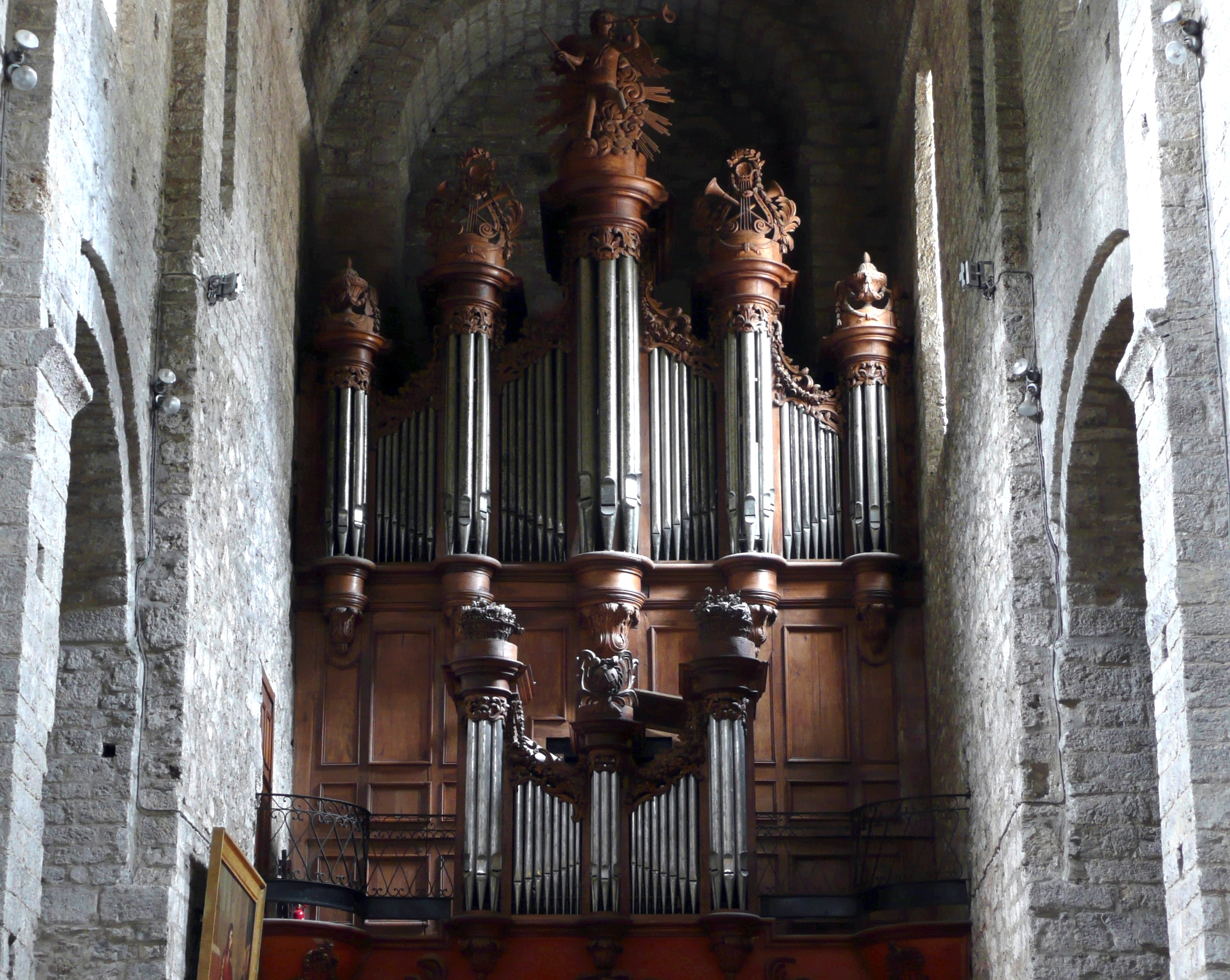
Orgue Jean-Pierre Cavaillé de l'abbaye de Gellone

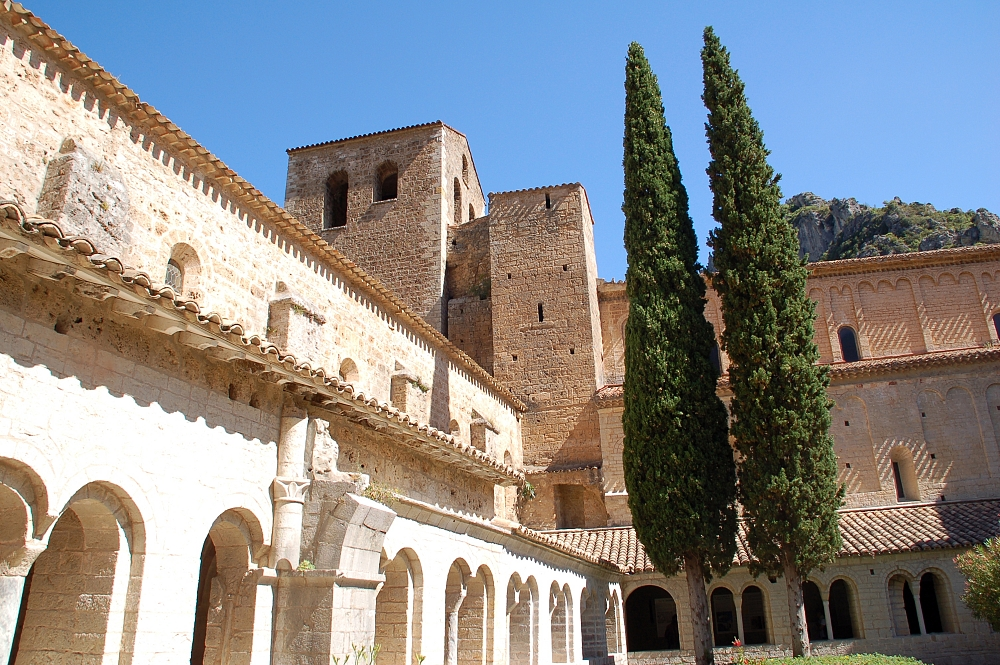
Cloître du monastère

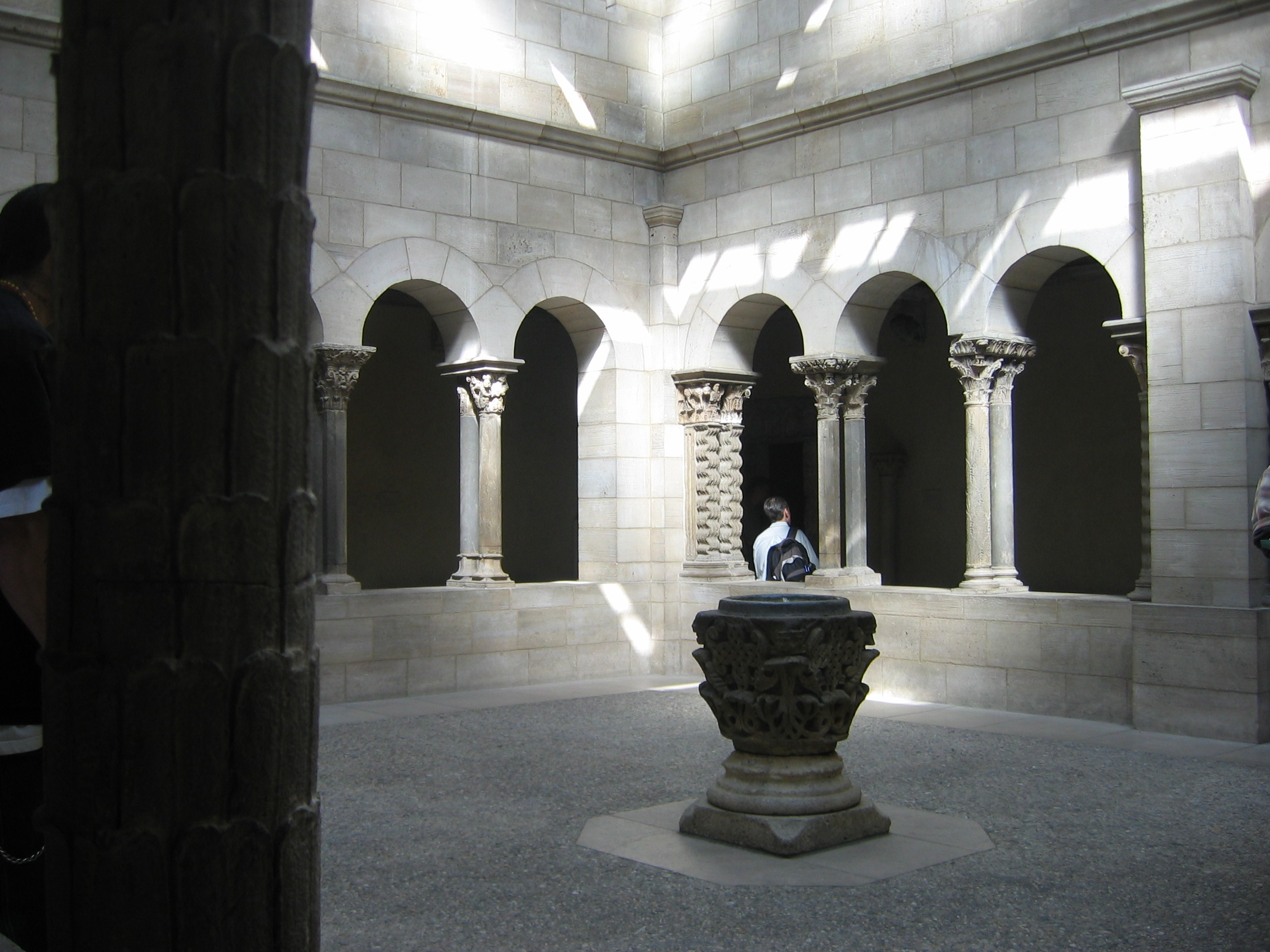
Cloître reconstruit au musée The Cloisters aux États-Unis

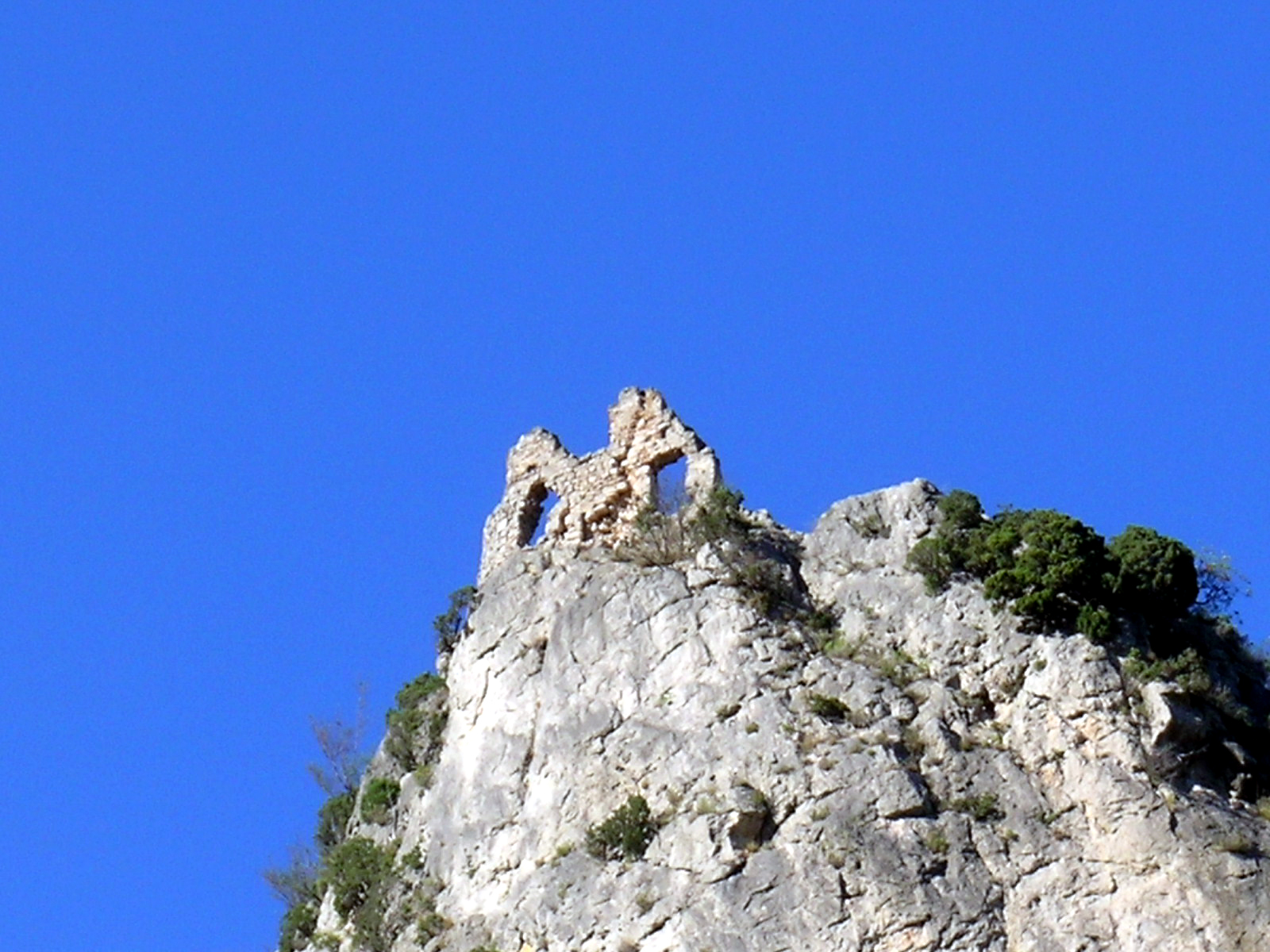
Les ruines du géant

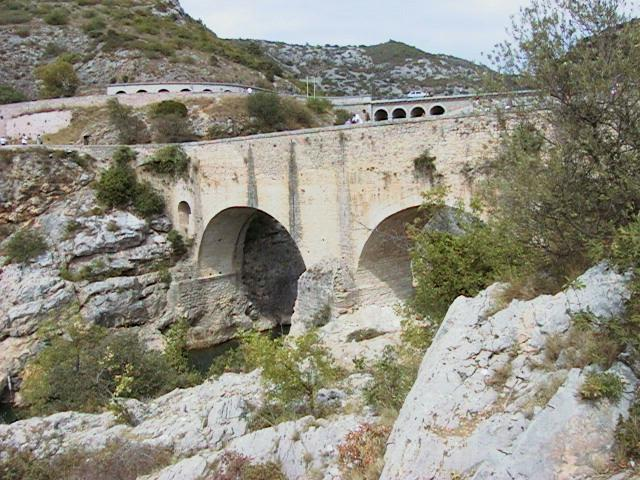
Pont du Diable (ou Pont de Saint Guilhem datant du Moyen Âge) enjambant l'Hérault

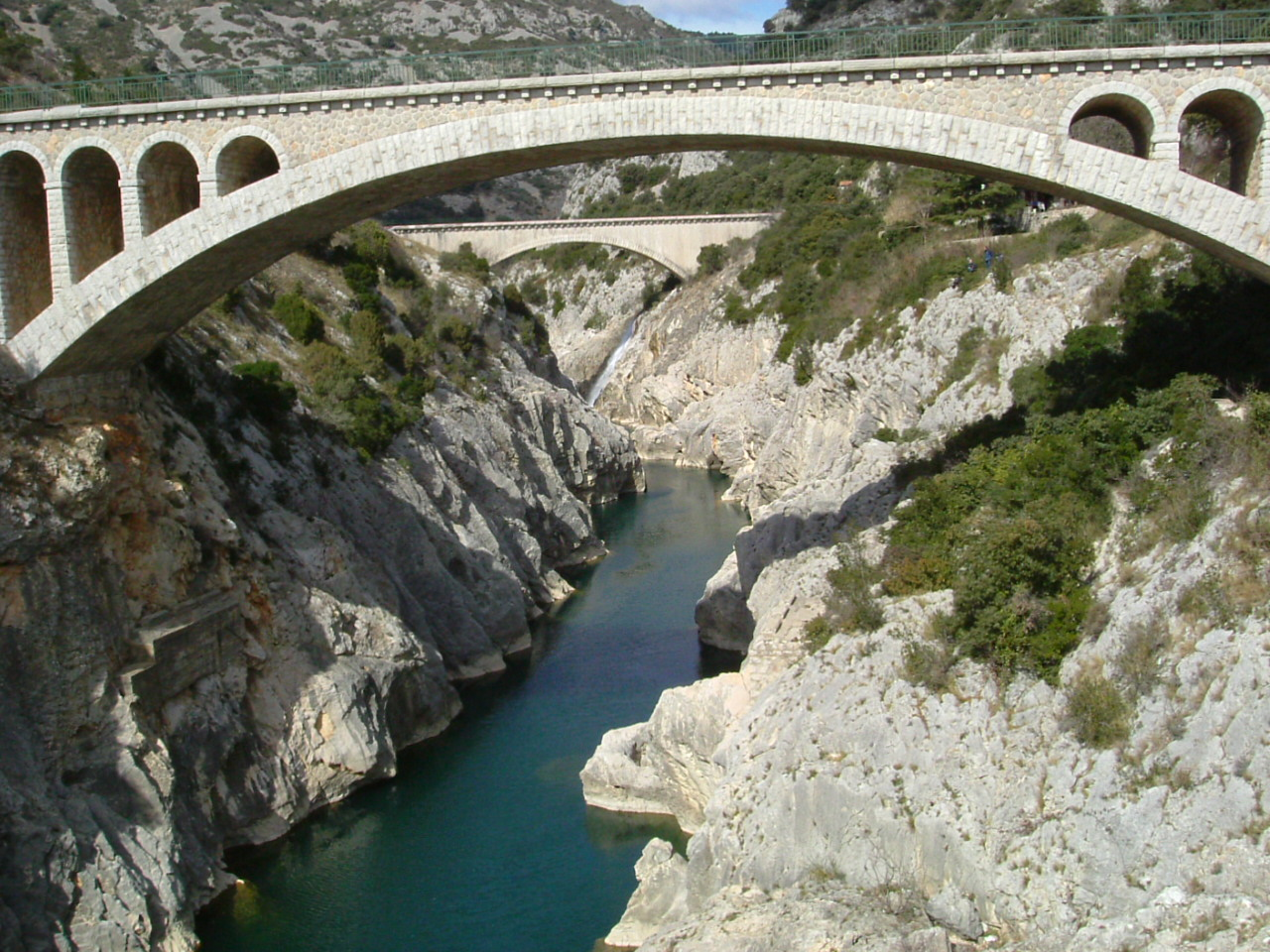
Nouveau pont sur l'Hérault (1932), à l'entrée des gorges de l'Hérault; au fond, l'aqueduc.

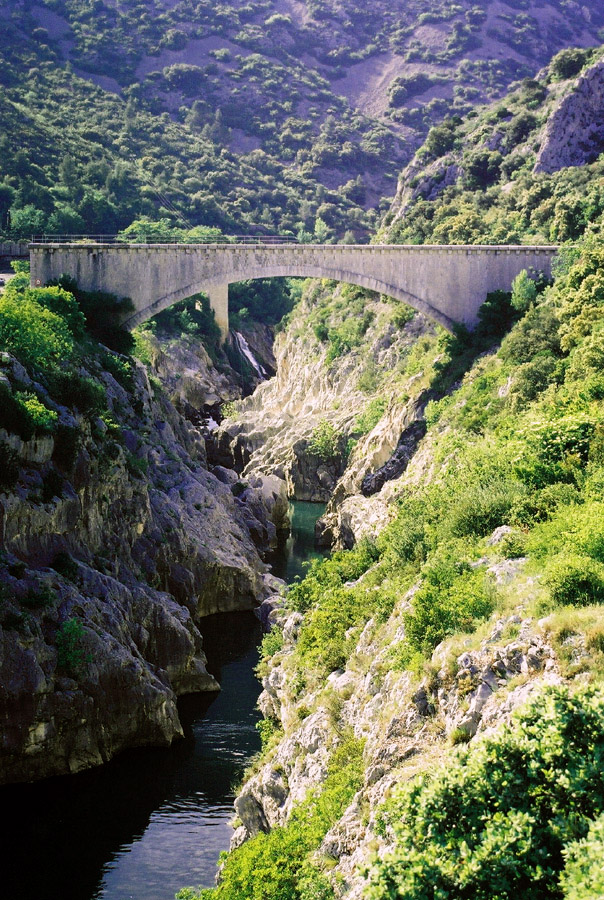
Pont du canal « de Gignac » (env. 1890) et gorges de l'Hérault.

== See also ==
- Communes of the Hérault department
