= Saint-Guilhem-le-Désert Abbey =

Abbey in Hérault, France

Coordinates: 43.7336°N 3.5489°E

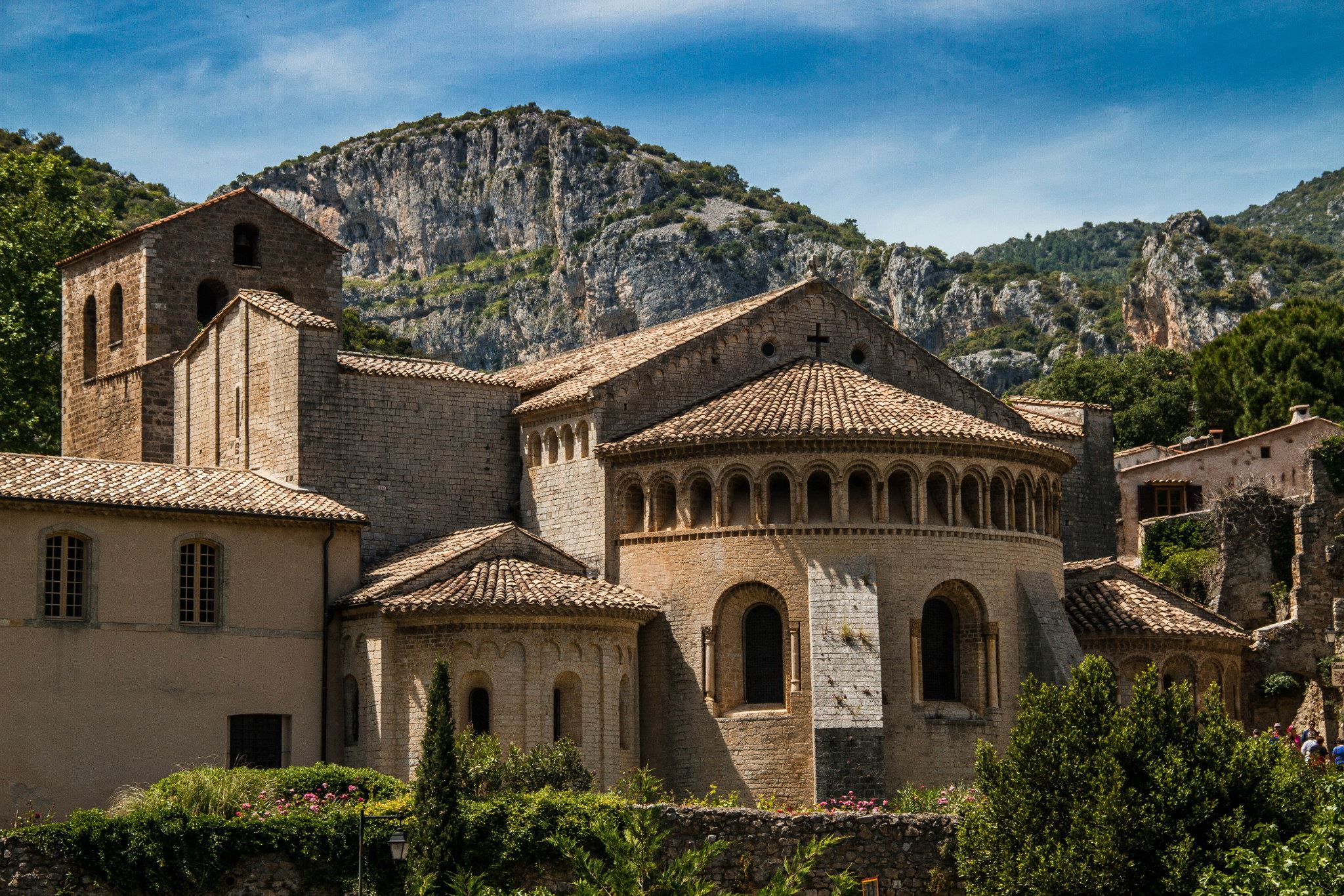
Exterior

Saint-Guilhem-le-Désert Abbey or Gellone Abbey is a Benedictine abbey in Saint-Guilhem-le-Désert, Hérault in France. It was founded in 804 by an Aquitanian aristocrat of the Carolingian era, William of Gellone (c. 742-812), known in Occitan as 'Guilhelm'. It was listed as a historic monument by France in 1840 and as part of the Routes of Santiago de Compostela in France World Heritage Site in 1998.
