= Khiva–Bukhara War of 1806 =

Khiva–Bukhara War Of 1806
Date	1806
Location	Lower Amu Darya
Result	Bukharan Victory

Belligerents
Khanate of Khiva	Emirate of Bukhara

Commanders and leaders
Eltuzar Muhammad Bahodir Khan	Niyaz Beg

Strength
Unknown	20,000

The Khiva–Bukhara War Of 1806 was a short conflict fought between the Emirate of Bukhara under Emir Haydar and the Khanate of Khiva under Eltuzar Muhammad. The war arose from border raids and political tensions along the Amu Darya region.

== Background ==
Following the death of Khivan ruler Avaz Inaq, power struggles erupted within Khiva, leading to the rise of Eltuzar Muhammad. During his rule, Khivan forces raided the frontier territories of Bukhara, and challenging Bukharan influence along the Oxus River. Emir Haydar, who had recently consolidated power in Bukhara, sought to reassert control and punish Khiva for its defiance.

== War ==
In early 1806, Emir Haydar dispatched a Large Bukharan Army of 20,000 under Niyaz-Bek to march on Khiva. The two armies clashed near the lower Amu Darya, where the Bukharans inflicted a decisive defeat on the Khivans. Eltuzar Muhammad was killed during the retreat some reports claim he drowned while attempting to cross the river. The Khivan army scattered, and many nobles were captured or executed.

== Aftermath ==
The defeat led to the collapse of Eltuzar's rule, and he was succeeded by his brother Mohammed Rahim Khan. However, Bukharan dominance proved short-lived. By 1811, Khiva under Muhammad Rahim Khan regained independence and reestablished authority over the Amu Darya delta. The war marked a temporary assertion of Bukharan power but ultimately deepened the rivalry between the two khanates.
