= Abdyrahym Zynhary =

Turkmen poet

- Born: Abdyrahym c. 1791 near Esenmeňli, Emirate of Bukhara
- Died: c. 1880
- Occupations: Mullah, philosophical poet
- Relatives: Polat baba (father); Abdysamyt (brother); Razyýa (daughter); Jumaguly (son)
- Writing career
- Pen name: Halajy, ussa Rahym, Rahym molla
- Language: Turkmen
- Period: Golden Age of Turkmen literature

Abdyrahym Zynhary (1791–1880), or just Zynhary, was a Turkmen poet. While he is considered a local figure of the Lebap Region, his legacy has been resilient to the test of time and influenced Turkmen poetry. Nowadays, in Turkmenistan, he is remembered as a patriot and a moralizing poet. His poetry depicts him as a wise and vehement preacher.

== Biography ==
Born Abdyrahym in 1791 near the village of Esenmeňli, located nowadays in Halaç District, Lebap Province, Turkmenistan, he was the son of Polat baba. His father was renowned as highly educated and widely recognized in the region. Turkmen tradition says that Polat baba studied at the Idris-baba Madrasa near Gyzylaýak, then became a teacher in Esenmeňli as a mullah.

Abdyrahym did not study in a madrasa but, before dying, his father taught him to read and write. As his family fell into poverty, he kept studying by himself. He was said to be a skilled blacksmith. He lived in a period of social instability for the Turkmens: resistance increased toward the Emirs of Bukhara, the Khans of Khiva, and the Shahs of Iran. In Lebap Region, Seýitnazar Seýdi was nicknamed the "poet-warrior" for his fights against Bukhara. As Abdyrahym grew old, he witnessed the Russian conquest of Central Asia as well. This period of conflict influenced his works approached subjects such as love, beauty, faith, courage, life, or values such as honor.

=== Work as a poet ===
He gave himself the nickname "Zynhary." While the word "zynhar" is a Turkmen literary word for "never," "under no circumstances," or "for God's sake," it also refers to a way of complaining that makes one look miserable or vulnerable. In 2019, Turkmen schoolbooks made it echo with "defenselessness" and "loneliness."

Early on, he met and worked with the poet Allaguly Allahy who was known in the region.

In his poems, Zynhary dealt with subjects like love and life. His most renowned love poem, "Akyl-huşy ýagşydyr," literally "Good is the wise one," talks about the beauty and virtues of a family. He describes that a beautiful family has to be wise and disciplined, and should reject foreigners and violence; he also pleads for young women to be virtuous and tolerant.

On the other hand, in his poem "Barypdyr," literally "It is gone/It has passed," he is critical of his society and wealth replacing moral values such as respect and generosity. This echoes the opposition between the traditional tribal societies of the Turkmens and Bukharan society.

== Legacy ==
Zynhary's legacy stays imprinted in the Lebap Region and in all Turkmenistan; his name and some of his poems are mentioned in literature textbooks and occasionally celebrated.

A monument to Zynhary stands south of Esenmeňli and Idris-baba Madrasa is still a tourist attraction north of the village of Magtymguly, formerly known as Gyzylaýak. Less than a kilometer southeast of Esenmeňli now lies a village named Zynhary.

== Writings ==
Here's an incomplete list of Zynhary's writings:

- Ahunym, "I am an Ahun"
- Akyl-huşlary, "The wise ones"
- Akyl-huşy ýagşydyr, "Good is the wise one"
- Aýa meňzetdim, "I mistook it for the moon"
- Barypdyr, "It is gone/It has passed"
- Bilmedi, "I did not know"
- Buharadadyr, "It is/was in Bukhara"
- Gelen dünýä, "The world that has come"
- Güwälik saňa, "A testimony to you"
- Muhannesiň eden işi gerekmez, "The outcome of shamelessness is not needed"
- Pul bolsa, "If there was money"
- Şat ýeriňi görmedim, "I haven't seen the joyful land"
- Sendedir, "It is you as well"
- Ýandym ýaranlar, literally: "Friends, I burned;" actually: "Friends, I was hurt"
- Ýetişdim, "I have matured"
- Ýigitler, "The persons"
