= Yomut =

Turkmen tribe

Yomut
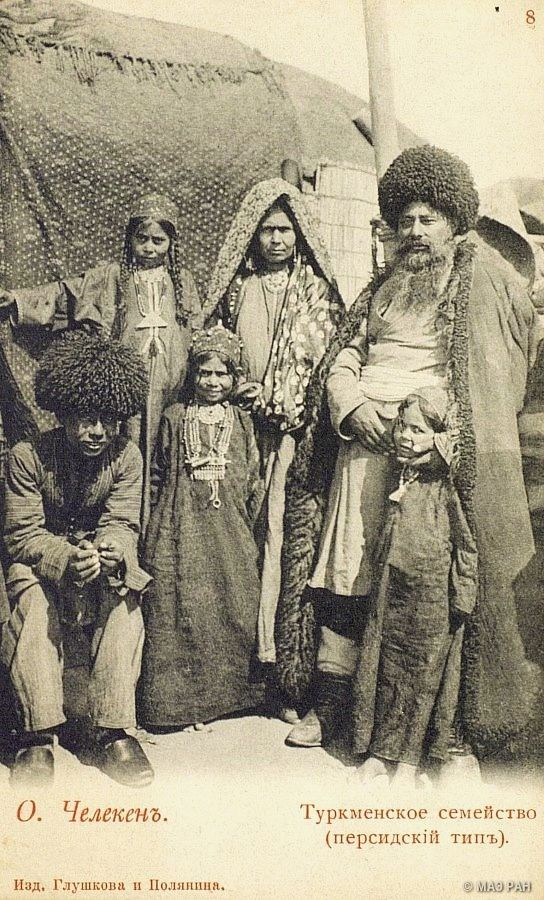
- A Yomut Turkmen family in traditional attire, Cheleken Island, early 20th century.

Regions with significant populations
- Turkmenistan and Iran, east coast of Caspian Sea

Languages
- Turkmen (Yomut dialect), Persian

Religion
- Sunni Islam, Naqshbandieh Sufism

Related ethnic groups
- Turkmens, Iranian Turkmens

The Yomut (Turkmen: Ýomut, Persian: یَمود/یُمود ) is a large ethnographic group within the Turkmen people and historically one of the five major tribes of Turkmenistan. The Yomut have maintained a distinct cultural identity and continue to live primarily in Turkmenistan, Iran, and Uzbekistan.

The earliest depictions and descriptions of the Yomut date back to the 16th century. The first official guidebook about the Yomut and the neighboring ethnic groups was written by Clement Augustus de Bode, titled On the Yamud and Goklan Tribes of Turkomania.

== Historical and modern Yomut tribes ==
The nineteenth-century ethnographic accounts provide some of the earliest detailed descriptions of the Yomut internal divisions.

According to Charles A. de Bode's On the Yomud and Goklan Tribes of Turkomania, published in the Journal of the Royal Asiatic Society in the mid-19th century, the Yomut of the Gorgan and Atrek regions were grouped into four principal tribal sections:

- Sheref: consisting of six subdivisions
- Chony: consisting of ten subdivisions
- Bayram-Shali: consisting of five subdivisions
- Kujfik-Tatar: consisting of eight subdivisions

De Bode notes that these groups were regarded as descendants of four brothers, whose father, "Yamud", is looked upon as the founder of their race (ethnicity).

In contemporary the tribal names have changed, and the Yomut are now represented as:

- Jafarbay (Was Sheref-Jafarbay)
- Ak-Atabay (Cony-Atabay)
- Bayram-Shali (Remained the same)

Early ethnographic works from the Russian Imperial period record several major patrilineal groupings (urug) within the Yomut. An ethnographic survey published in 1900 notes that, among the Yomut of the Transcaspian region, social and cultural distinctions were often framed around three prominent lineages: the Jafarbay, the Aq, and the Atabay.

- Jafarbay (Cäfärbay) — identified as one of the largest and most influential Yomut branches; historically associated with territories between the Atrek River and the southeastern Caspian coast.
- Atabay (Atabai) — another major Yomut lineage, noted for settlements in the Balkan region and northern Iran. Together with the Jafarbay, the Atabay formed one of the two primary rival groupings within Yomut society.
- Aq (Ak) — listed in the same source as the third major lineage, forming the counterpart to the Jafarbay in traditional social rivalries.

These lineages were described as playing a role similar to that of major segmentary divisions among other Turkmen tribes, such as the Otamış and Toktamış among the Teke. While modern Yomut tribal identity is less rigid, dialectal and minor cultural differences between these groups continue to be noted in regional ethnographic studies.

Ethnographic research from the early 20th century, including the work of Karpov (1925), notes that the Aq (Ak) and Atabay (Atabai) lineages eventually merged into a single composite grouping known as the Ak-Atabay. Following this consolidation, the former tribal names continued to exist as sub-tribal divisions within the larger Ak-Atabay structure.

Diagrams of Yomut tribes, divisions, and clans recorded by G.I Karpov 1925
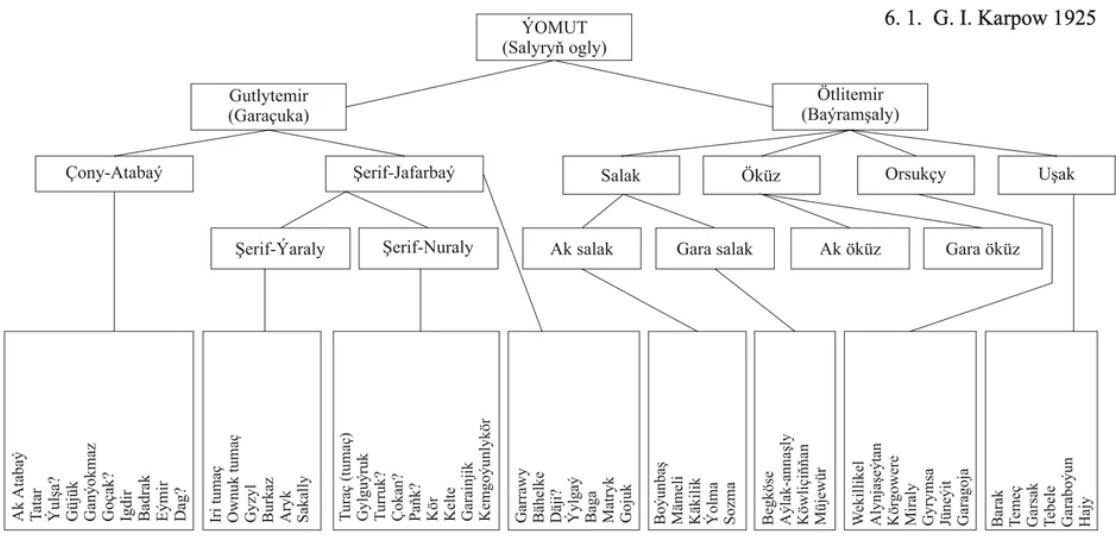
The Khivan (Bayram- Shali) and the Gurgan Yomut tribes, divisions, and clans.

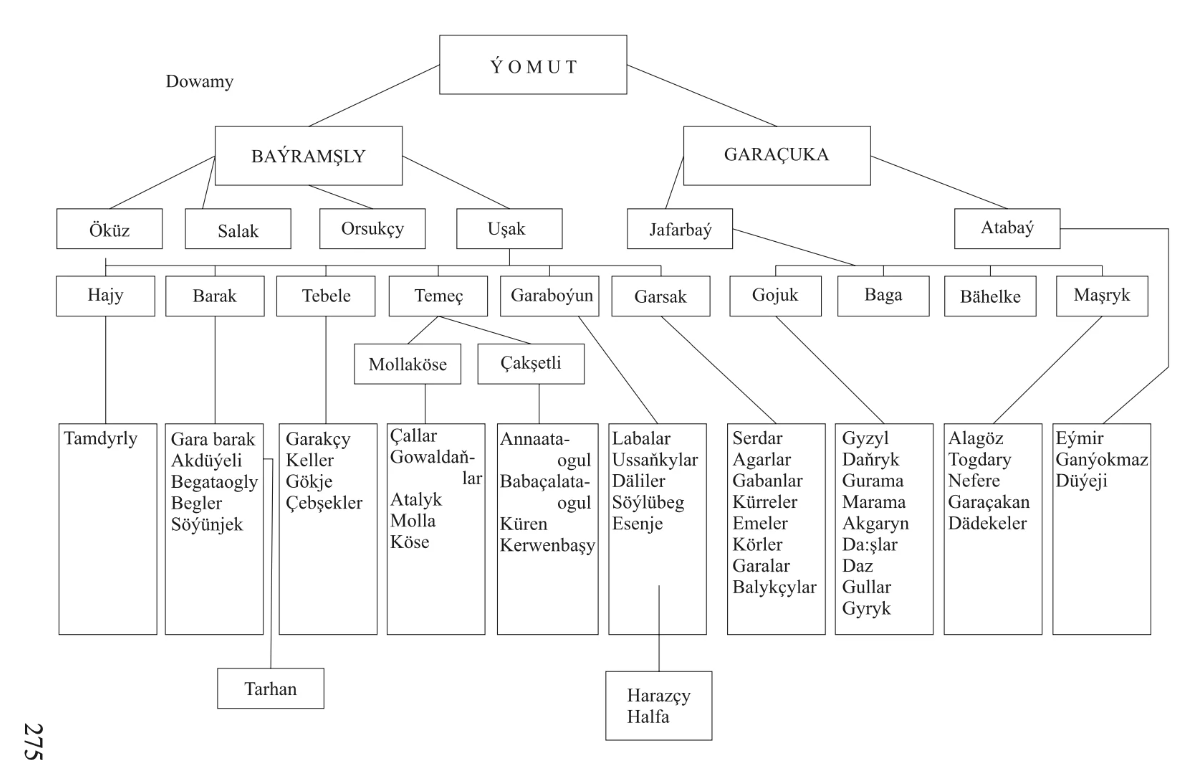
The Khivan (Bayram- Shali) and Gurgan Yomut tribes, divisions, and clans.

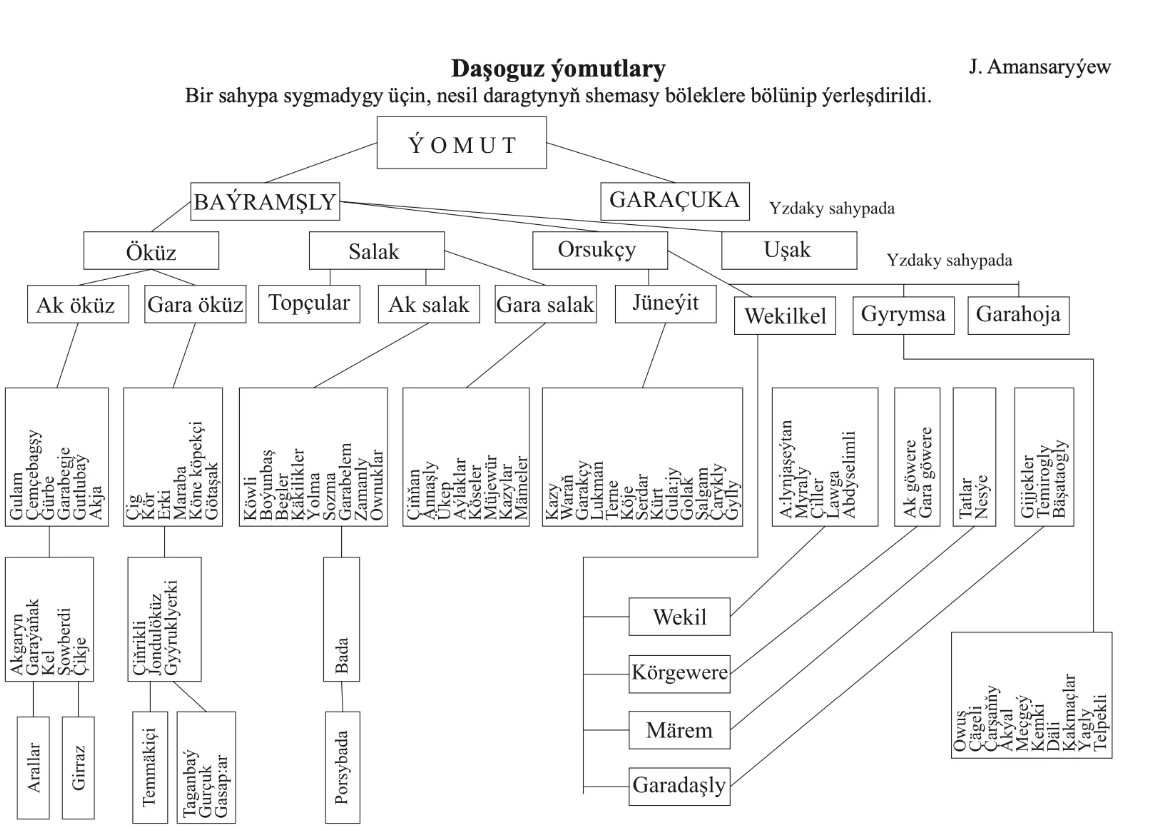
The divisions, and the clans of the Khivan Yomut (Bayram- Shali)

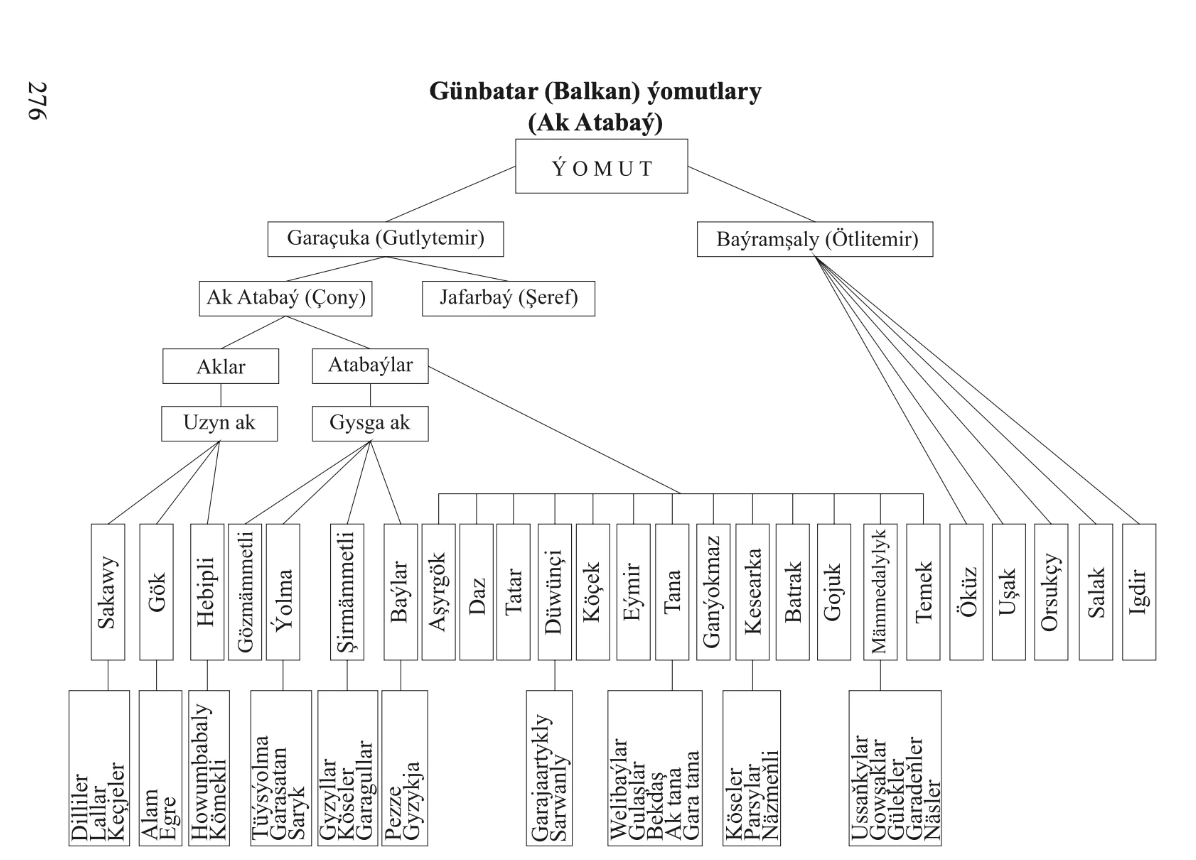
Divisions of the Ak-Atabay tribe and the Bayram- Shali.

== Social divisions and the economic divisions ==
The Yomut Turkmen were traditionally organised not as a unified tribal confederation under a single centralised authority, but rather as a loose coalition of autonomous clans and lineages, each often led by its own local khan or chieftain. While all were identified under the broader Yomut name, these groups operated semi-independently, forming alliances as needed for mutual defense or political interest. Because of this decentralised structure, scholars such as Richard Tapper consider the Yomut not a formal confederation, but a "coalition"—a distinction used to differentiate tribal groups lacking centralised leadership. This flexible political organisation allowed the Yomut to remain resilient and independent in the face of external control, but also made them prone to internal rivalry unless unified by external threats or charismatic leadership.

The Yomut are divided into two primary geographical categories:

- Gurgan (Turkmen: Balkan Yomutlary; Also called Gorgan or Gutlytemir): The Gurgan Yomut live in the Gorgan Plain of Iran and the southern bank of the Caspian Sea in Turkmenistan.
- Khiva (Turkmen: Dashoguz Yomutlary; Also called Bayramsly): The Khiva Yomut live to the immediate west of the city of Khiva, across the border in Turkmenistan.

The nineteenth-century ethnographic sources describe the Yomut as being divided into two principal socio-economic groupings based on mode of life and occupation.

According to Charles A. de Bode, writing on the Yomut in the mid-19th century, these categories were not hereditary but reflected differences in subsistence and settlement patterns.

• Chomur (Çomur):

The Chomur lived primarily along the banks of the Gorgan River, extending southwards toward the Karasu. They practised agriculture, cultivating wheat, barley, rice, and vegetables, and maintained gardens and fields in the river valleys. Bode notes that the Chomur had more frequent commercial contact with neighbouring Persian settlements, particularly Asterabad, where they traded felt, woven carpets, grain, butter, sheep, horses, and other products.

• Charwa (Chorva):

The Charwa lived to the north, along the Atrek River and the steppe approaching the desert. They were pastoral nomads whose economy centred on herding sheep, camels, and horses. Bode describes them as more independent and more distant from Persian authority due to their location farther from cultivated lands and administrative centres.

Bode emphasises that the distinction between Chomur and Charwa was fluid: families could move from one category to the other depending on economic circumstances, such as acquiring or losing herds.

== Culture ==
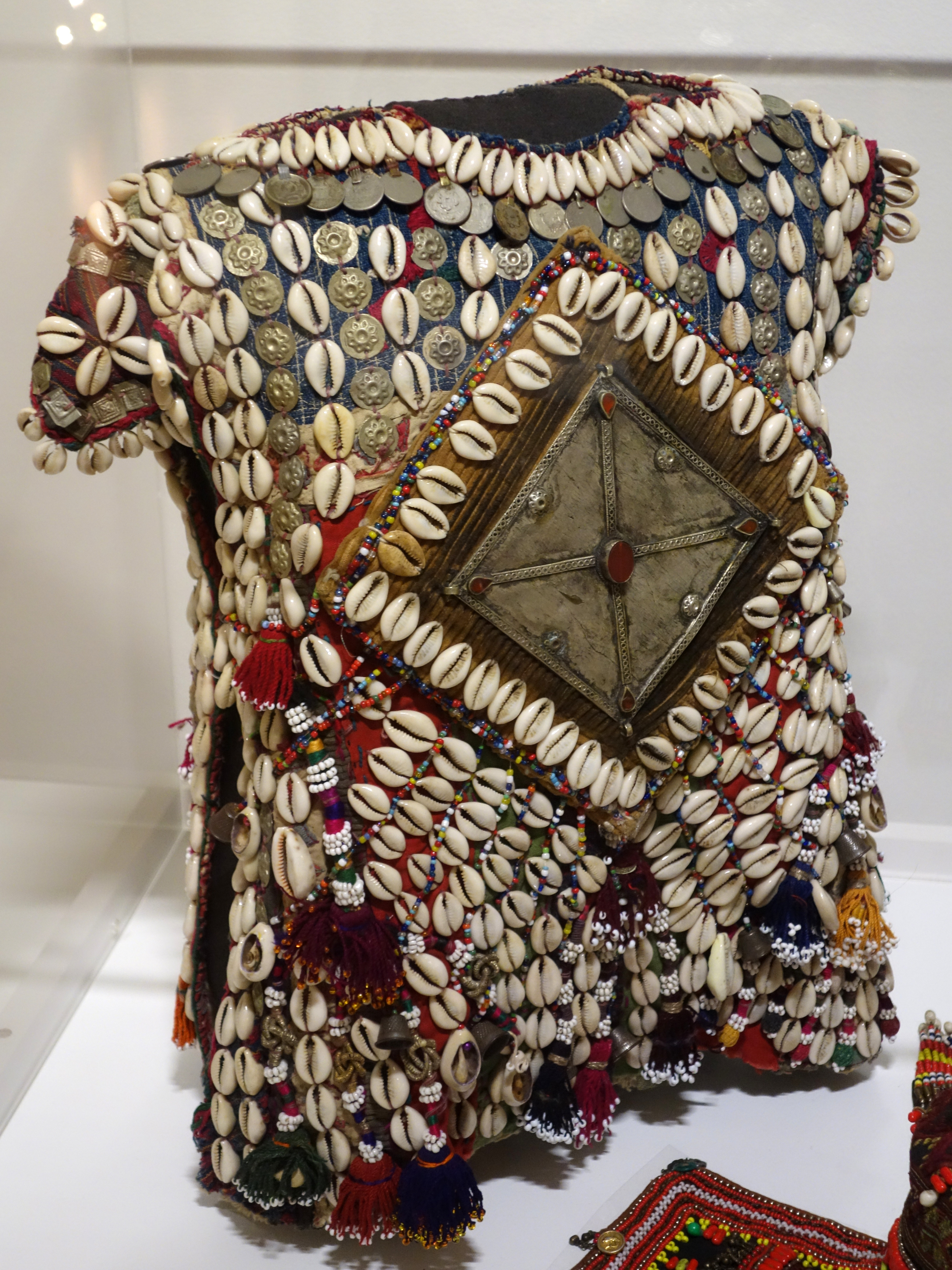
Yomut child's tunic, early-mid 20th century

The Yomut culture is unique from other Turkmen tribes, especially in its traditions, rituals, and customs.

The Kushtdepdi is a traditional rite of singing and dancing that combines improvised poetic verses with rhythmic group movement. In 2017, the practice was inscribed on the UNESCO Representative List of the Intangible Cultural Heritage of Humanity under the title “Kushtdepdi rite of singing and dancing.”

According to official Turkmen cultural publications, Kushtdepdi represents one of the most distinctive forms of Turkmen folk performance.

While the dance has been practised across various Turkmen communities, the coastal groups including some of the Yomut communities, are often noted in contemporary cultural accounts as contributing to its preservation and transmission. However, UNESCO and other major heritage sources do not attribute the tradition exclusively to any single Turkmen tribe.

Among Gurgan Yomut who live on the shore of the Caspian Sea, fishing is an extremely significant part of life. Based on local estimates, there are at maximum 40 fishers in every village. Historically, the Eurasian carp was the most commonly caught fish, however due to environmental loss and overfishing, their population has significantly declined since 1992. Today, almost no Eurasian carp are caught. In recent years, Yomut have adopted modern fishing tools such as galvanized fishing nets and motorboats, though these have also been blamed by locals for a decline in the quantity and quality of fish. Galvanized nets are known locally as "Namardi nets", Narmardi literally meaning invisible, but colloquially used to refer to something considered unmanly.

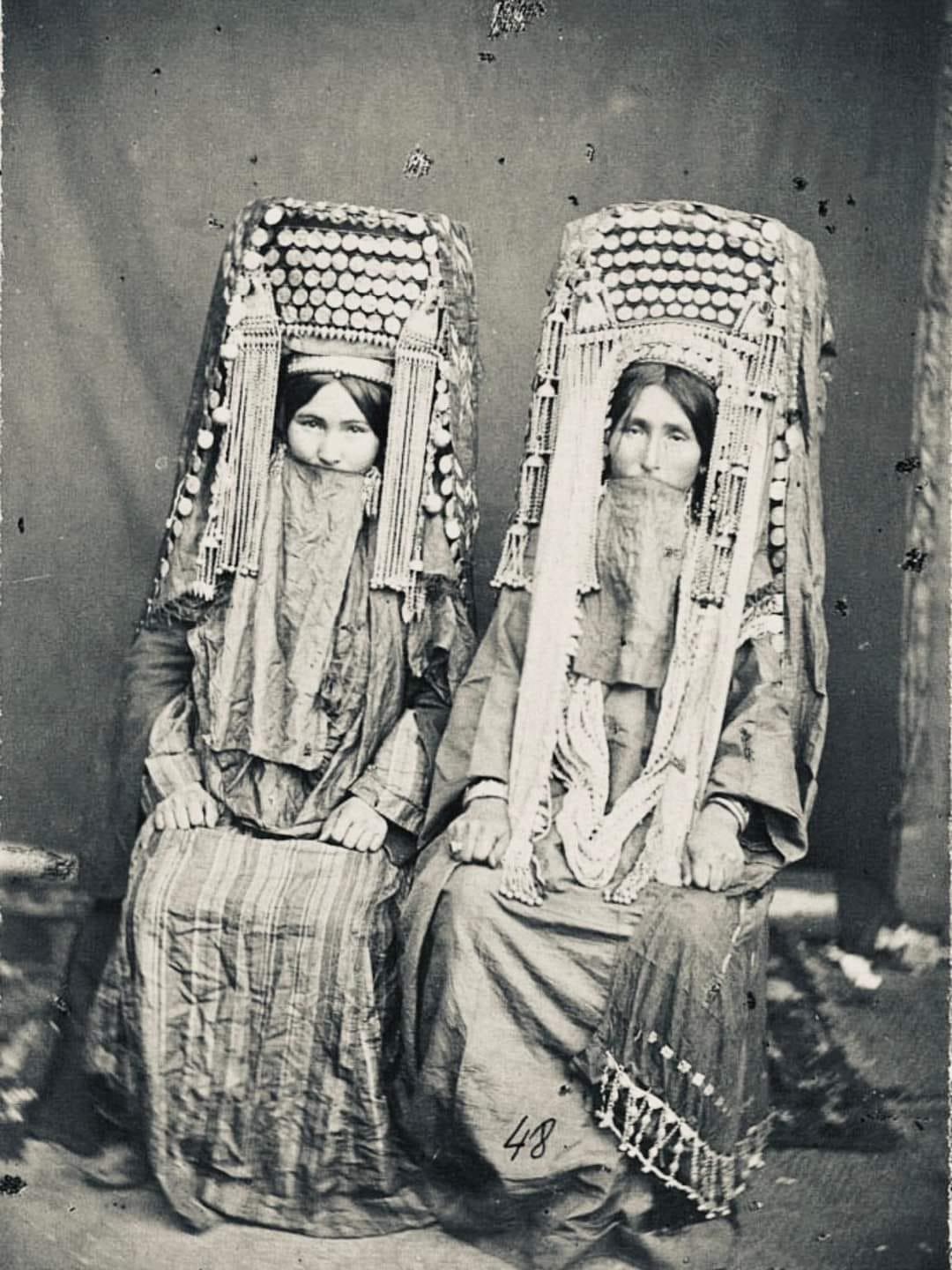
High-class Yomut women from Krasnovodsk, Turkmenistan wearing Kasaba

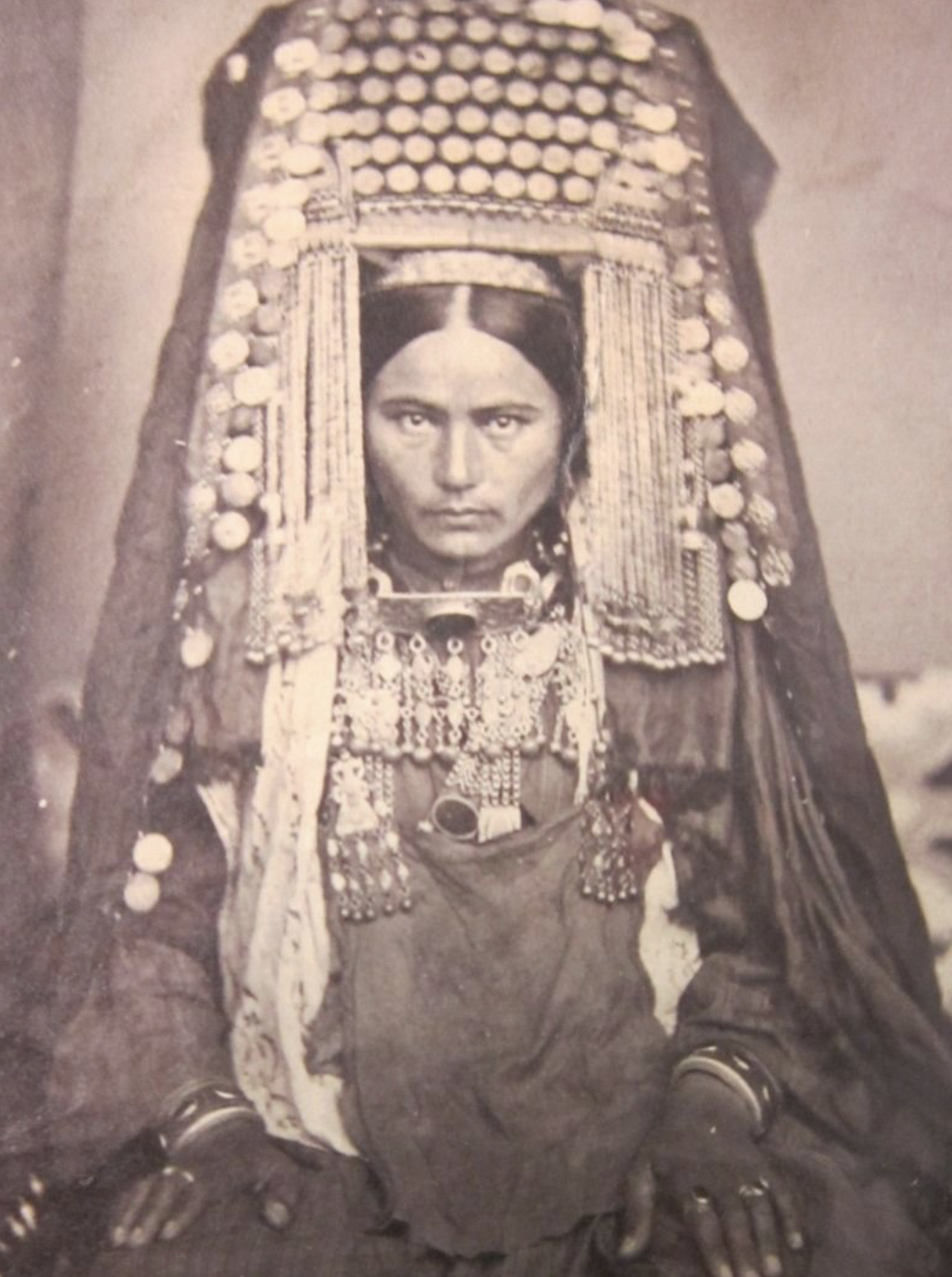
An alternative photo showing how Kasava/Kasaba is worn without the face mask covering the mouth.

The khasava (also called khasaba) was a traditional Yomut Turkmen women's wedding headdress, reaching 30 cm or more in height. It was constructed on a widening frame, originally from wheat stalks and later cardboard, draped with fabric and covered with a purenjek (shawl) or don (robe). The headdress was richly decorated with gilded silver plaques, pendants, beads, and chains with bells, whose jingling was compared to the rattle of a snake. Similar in form to the Russian kokoshnik, but much taller, it was considered to preserve features of ancient ritual headgear associated with fertility cults.

Traditionally, the khasava was worn by young brides on their wedding day, removed during the gaytarma period (the temporary return of the bride to her family's home after the wedding before fully settling into her husband's house), and then worn again until the birth of the first or second child. By the early 20th century, variants of the khasava were widespread among young and middle-aged women regardless of childbirth status, though the tall type became rare and was gradually replaced by a shorter form known as alym dany (or beruk, a style borrowed from Iranian women). Different Turkmen tribes used various local names for similar headdresses, including borik (Teke), topby/topba (Sarakhs), bagmak (Ersari), chanie (Nokhur), uramak (northern Yomut), aladaŋy (western Yomut), kars (Khatab and Mukry), dastar (Salyr and Geoklen), and pechek (Lebap).

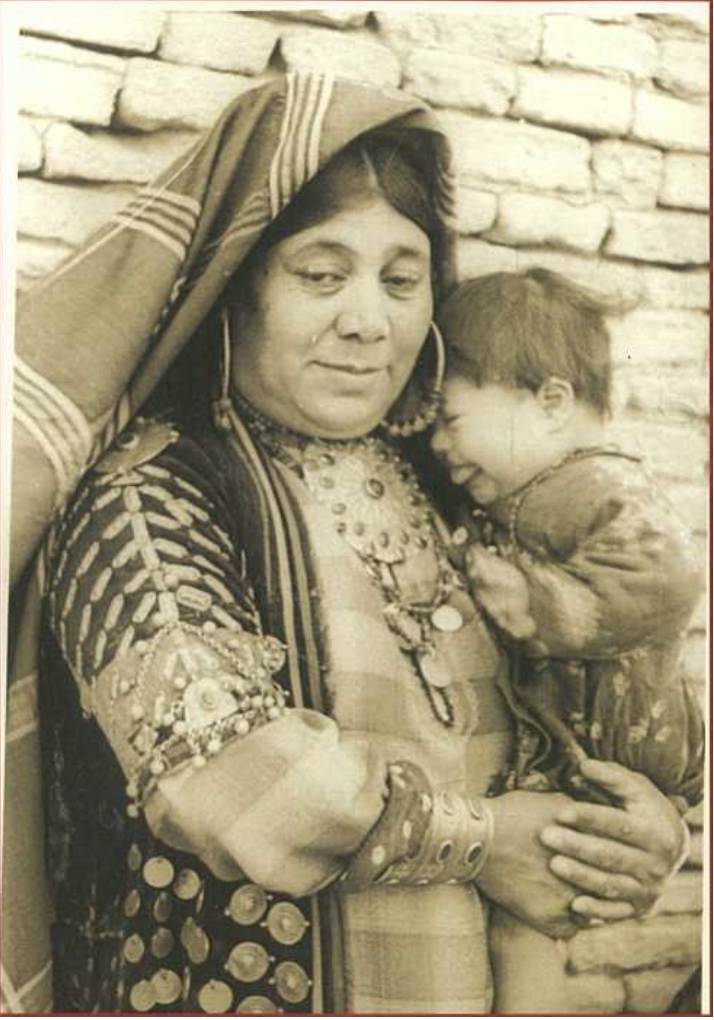
Yomut Turkmen of the Jafarbay tribe with her child in her daily clothes. Undated, from the Archive of the IEA RAS.

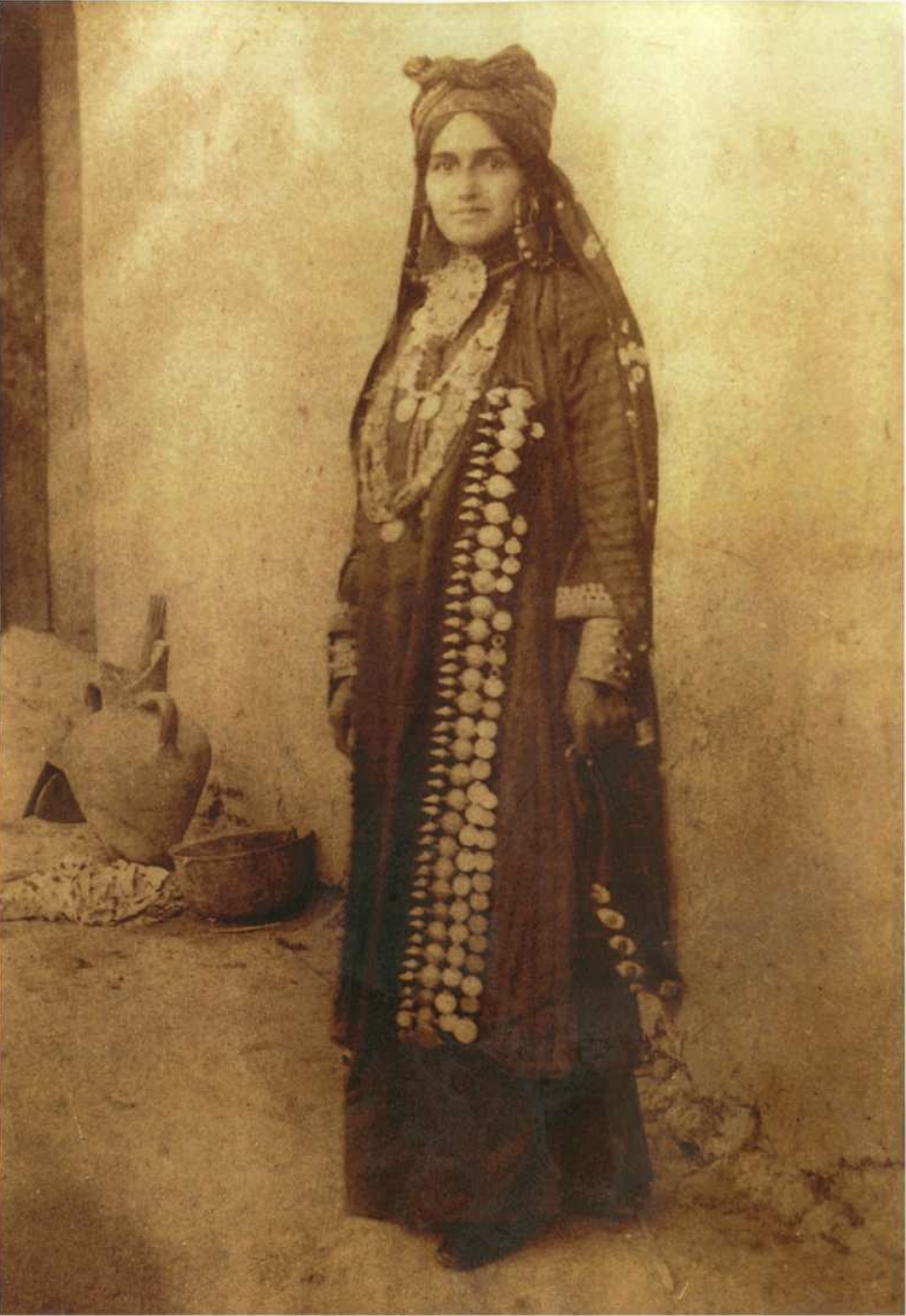
Yomut woman from the Atabay tribein her daily attire Undated, from the Archive of the IEA RAS.

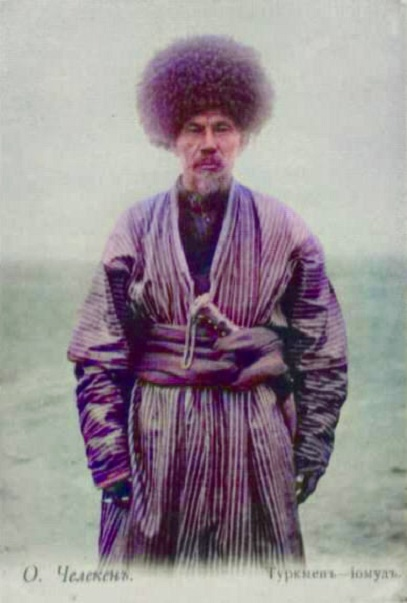
Yomud Turkmen

== History ==
=== Early history ===
The Yomut are one of the major Turkmen tribes, traditionally divided into two groups: the western (Shagadam) Yomuts and the northern (Dashhowuz) Yomuts. A significant portion of the Yomut population lives in the Turkmen region of Iran (Turkmensahran, Etrek and Gurgen districts), while smaller subgroups can also be found in Afghanistan and Karakalpakstan.

Although the name Yomut is very ancient, the tribe appears to have reached formal tribal status only in the late Middle Ages, after the Mongol invasions (12th century onwards). In earlier sources, such as Abylgazy's Genealogy of the Turkmens (16th century), the term "Yomut" is not used to refer to the tribe, but rather to a smaller lineage or clan. According to Abylgazy, the Yomuts descend from Ögürjik Alp, a grandson of Salyr Ghazan: Ögürjik Alp → Berdi → Gulmy → Yomut (Gulmy's second son, Gultak, is considered a sibling lineage).

It is possible that the Yomuts consolidated into a full tribe by gathering people from different branches of the Salyr tribe in the Balkan and Mangyshlak regions, because:

· Abylgazy counts the Yomut as direct descendants of Salyr.

· In the 16th century, Yomuts, together with the Ersary, Saryk, and Teke tribes, belonged to the tribal union known as the outer Salyr.

· The name Gultag, considered a sibling lineage to the Yomut, is preserved as a clan name among the Salyr and Ersary tribes.

Other Yomut sub-clan names also correspond closely to ethnonyms found among these tribes.

An alternative perspective on the origins of the Yomut comes from the research of T. P. Vasilyeva, as cited by Shokhrat Kadyrov. Vasilyeva argues that the ancestors of modern Turkmens were Iranian-speaking populations inhabiting the Aral–Caspian steppes and the oases of southern and northern Turkmenistan. She traces a cultural continuity from these ancient Iranian-speaking groups in western Central Asia, spanning the Hunnic and Parthian–Kangju periods, and emphasizes that the ancient Scythians formed a foundational element in Turkmen ethnogenesis.

In her studies of female ornaments, G. P. Vasilyeva identified a distinctive Sarmatian–Alan group, showing similarities with jewelry from peoples of the Volga and North Caucasus regions. The presence of Alans on the Ustyurt Plateau is attested in the 11th century. Similarities are observed between Yomut jewelry and North Caucasian Alan ornaments from the 6th–8th centuries in Ossetia, as well as finds from medieval burial grounds in mountainous Ingushetia dating to the 15th–16th centuries.

== Etymology ==
According to Soltansha Atanyyazov in Şejere (Türkmeniň nesil daragty) (Ashgabat: Turan-1, 1994, p. 148, in Turkmen), several interpretations of the origin of the ethnonym Yomut have been proposed.

The Turkmen scholar Nazar Yomudskii suggested that it derives from the name of a progenitor, Söýünhan, a descendant of Salyr Ghazan, whose son Ýomut is said to have lived at the end of the 12th and beginning of the 13th century.

The ethnographer Ata Jykyýew recorded two folk legends about the meaning of the name. According to the first, the word comes from ýowm it, meaning "dog’s lair." The story goes that a woman gave birth to a child while on the move, wrapped the baby, and placed it in a dog’s den. The people who descended from this child came to be called ýowmit–ýowmut–ýomut. According to the second legend, the word comes from ýow ("enemy") and mut ("defeated, subdued"), meaning "one who defeats the enemy."

Another explanation, proposed by the Hungarian scholar Ármin Vámbéry in the mid-19th century, links the ethnonym to the Old Turkic word yom, meaning “people,” “tribe,” or “clan,” combined with the pluralising suffix –ut. Although yom in this sense has not survived in modern Turkmen, it appears in words such as ýumak (“bundle of wool”), ýumruk (“fist”), ýumalak (“round object”), and ýumurtga (“egg”). In Uyghur, ýumut meant “group” or “assembly,” while in Old Turkic languages, words like ýumgy and ýumgylyg meant “gathering” or “collection.”

Clement Augustus de Bode (1848) observed that the Yomut and Goklan tribes regarded themselves as descendants of a free woman. This social distinction aligns with the first folk legend recorded by Ata Jykyýew, in which the Yomut are said to descend from a child placed in a dog’s den, emphasizing noble or free ancestry.

The exact meaning of the name Yomut remains uncertain.

=== Khiva Khanate ===
It is said that at the end of the reign of Shahgazi Khan (c. 1181 x. - 1767) the Yomuts and Choudors captured Khiva. As a result of attempts at resistance, the khan was overthrown from the throne.

In the same year, some of the dignitaries, hostile towards Muhammad Emin-inak, began to fight against him. For this reason, the inak went to the yomuts, (but) after 18 days Abd-us-Sattar-bai was brought from there. At this time, the dominance of the Yomuts already crossed all borders, and their cruelty and oppression burdened the population to the extreme (fukara).

As a result, Muhammad Emin-inak, Abd-us-Sattar-bai and Abd-ur-Ra-khim-mekhter opposed the Yomuts, but were defeated in the battle of Arab-khane. Pursuing them, the Yomuts stopped at Kara-Tepe and began to prepare for a siege. Some (from the Khivans) began to talk about peace; when the dignitaries (umara) came out and met with the chiefs of the yomuts, they were seized, and at the same time, the yomuts, taking advantage of the fact that the city dwellers were persecuting the teke and the salyrs, seized the city of Khiva.

The Yomuts, with the help of the Aral people, conquered Kungrad, (after which) the power was in their hands.

They put Khan Geldy-inak at the head of the power, who was an adherent and well-wisher of this (Turkmen) tribe, and they did not reckon with other dignitaries, starting with Muhammad Emin, and even treated them with contempt. Themselves at this time began to rob the people, stealing their property and women and insulting him in every possible way.

In 1770, Muhammad Amin-biy, the leader of the Uzbek tribe of Kungrats, defeated the Yomuts and established his power in the khanate.

In 1779, by order of Mohammed Emin-inak, an army of Yomuts, who belonged to the Khorasan and Gurgan Turkmens, came to the outskirts of Khiva. Let it be known that these Yomuts belonged to two different clans (taif): some were called bairam-shahli, and others - choni-sheref, also known under the nickname kara-choka. Mohammed Emin-inak accepted them for service. After that, both of these troops went to war with his enemies.

During the reign of the son and successor of the inak Evez-biy (died March 13, 1804), the Yomuts, apparently, were not in openly hostile relations with him, judging by the fact that he fled to their territory in 1206. (1791 | 92) Pahlavan Quli Bai was extradited by them to the Inak, due to the fact that they "were afraid of his anger and severity."

After the death of Evez-biy in 1219 h. (1804/05) power in Khiva passed to his son Eltuzer, who soon declared himself Khan. From all over the country, the tribes of Turkmens, Kara-Kalpaks and Uzbeks came in whole detachments to congratulate him, but the Yomuts, who, having lived in Urgench for 60 years, did not obey the Khiva khans, laughed at Eltuzer Khan and showed disobedience.

Eltuzer Khan, after ascending to the khan's throne, gave out support to the troops and went to pogrom the Yomuts who lived on the edge of the desert towards Astrabad - the territory of Iran and Gürgen, located south of the city of Khiva. Some of them lived sedentary, while most were nomads. There were approximately 12 thousand families (at the beginning of the 19th century). Each family has two riders, they have thoroughbred horses and are good at pike and saber. So, this tribe was divided into two parts. Some decided to obey, saying: "We cannot leave the homeland of our ancestors and how can we live in a foreign country!" Some of them refused to obey because Eltuzer Khan suggested to them: "If you give up your raids, disobedience and robberies and live like other subjects, paying taxes from sheep, camels and agriculture, then it's good, otherwise, leave our state. " After some time Eltuzer Khan sent a messenger to the yomuts in Astrabad with oaths and assurances to say: "Together with your families and kin, return to the homeland of your ancestors, we will show you affection and love, you will participate in the use of our wealth." Yomuts joyful and cheerful began to return. Eltuzer Khan again handed them their former possessions, so that they could start farming.

After Eltuzer Khan in 1221, H. (1806) power passed into the hands of Mohammed Rahim Khan (1806–1825), to whom the Yomuts also obeyed.

The Yomuts raided the Astrabad and Mazandaran provinces of Persia and Khorasan to kidnap local residents, whom they then sold into slavery, mainly to the Khiva Khanate.

=== Russian conquest and rule ===
During the middle of the 19th century, the Yomut had relatively amicable relations with the Russian Empire, though issues persisted. Russia used this relationship to build the port Krasnovodsk in Türkmenbaşy Gulf during the early 1870s, as part of a larger campaign to counter the United Kingdom in the Great Game. However, Russian troops would exploit the Yomut to further their military goals. Atabai Yomut were raided for their camels and livestock by Russian troops during a failed attack on Khiva, breaking a treaty. Several months later, Russians attempted to barter for Atabai Yomut camels for the Khivan campaign of 1873. When rejected, they once again raided the area.

From 1880 to 1884 the Russian Empire began a land invasion of Turkmenistan, rapidly acquiring major towns and cities. Some Yomut tribes accepted Russian rule, such as those living in the Merv Oasis. However, Russian General Mikhail Skobelev used threats to gain the loyalty of several Yomut tribes, and carried out punitive military actions against dissenters. These actions, combined with significant Yomut casualties in the Battle of Geok Tepe, damaged Russian-Yomut relations.

In the 1910s, the city of Khorezm was significantly weakened by ethnic tension between Turkmens and Uzbeks. The ruling dynasty and much of the urban population was Uzbek, while the rural population was primarily composed of nomadic Yomut. In 1913, a local Yomut leader named Junaid Khan exploited this weakness and attacked the city, though Russian artillery forces prevented him from succeeding. The outbreak of World War I drew Russian troops away from garrisoning the region, and so in 1915 Junaid Khan led a successful attack against Khorezm. He was eventually forced to retreat to the Persian border due to Russian counterattacks. The outbreak of the Russian Civil War in 1917 once again weakened local Russian forces, and Junaid Khan reoccupied Khorezm. The Khan of Khiva, Isfandiyar Khan was executed, and Sayid Abdullah was installed as a puppet ruler.

In July 1918 the Transcaspian Government was established in Turkmenistan, a provisional government led by Mensheviks and Social Revolutionaries against Bolshevik forces. Local Turkmen, especially Yomut proved to be uncooperative with the Transcapsian government. In response, they were mobilized against the Red Army to prevent them from clashing with the government. By December most Turkmen had begun cooperating with the Transcaspian government and British forces in the region to stabilize the region, but Yomut Turkmen were revolting against the government. In response, the government began to militarily suppress the tribe.

In January 1924 Junaid Khan regrouped his forces and led an unsuccessful three-week siege against the city of Khiva. In July he was driven into exile.
