= Khongirad =

Major division of the Mongol tribes

Khongirad (Khun, Khungirad, Onggirat)
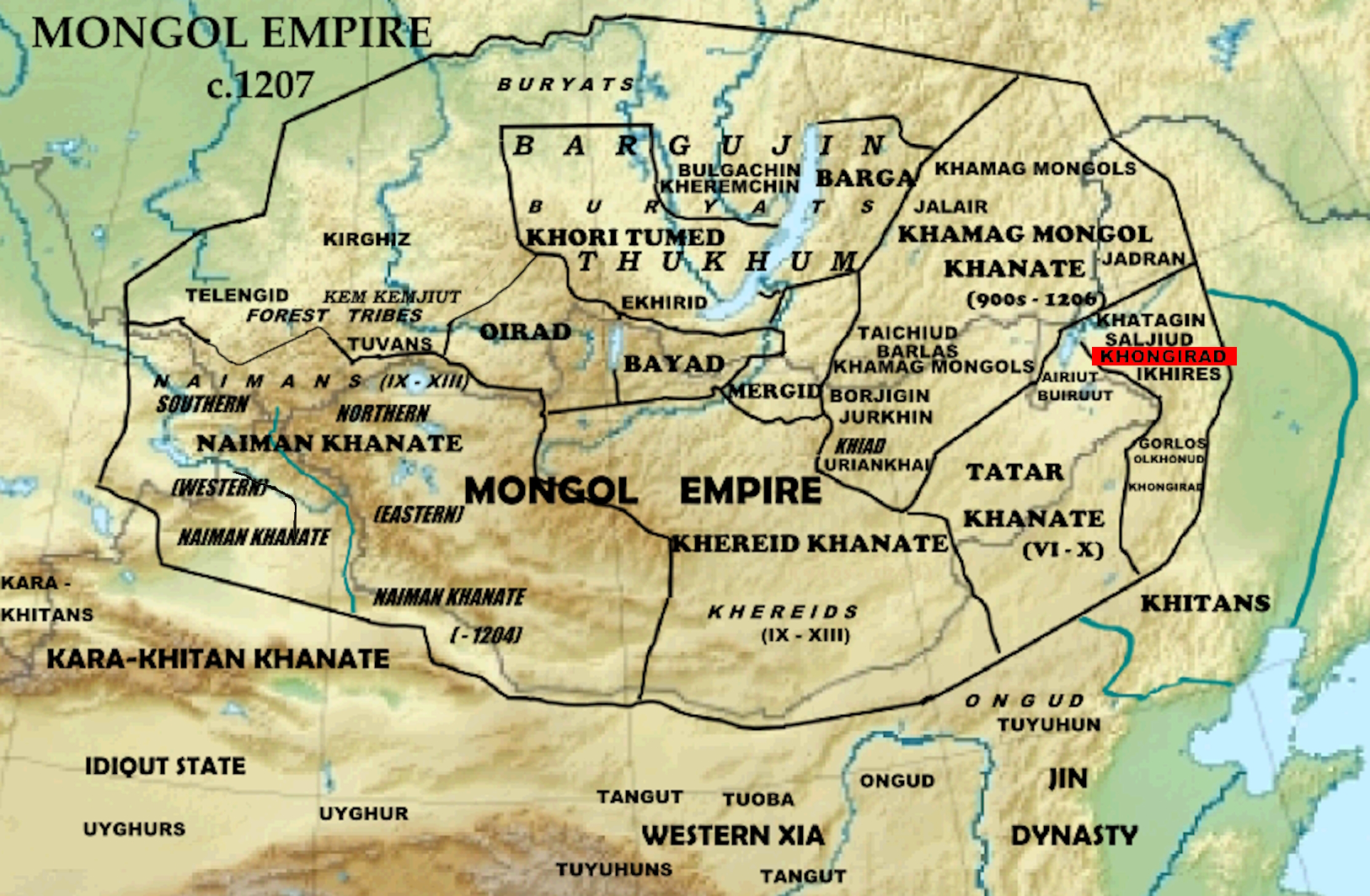
- Country: Mongol Empire, Mongol states, Central Asian countries, Mongolia
- Titles: Khatun
- Connected families: Borjigin; Chinggisid; List of Mongol consorts
- Estate: Mongolia

The Khongirad (Note: Variations on the name include Onggirat, Ongirat, Qongrat, Khungirat, Kungrad, Qunghrãt, Wangjila (王紀剌), Yongjilie (雍吉烈), Qungrat, and Guangjila (廣吉剌) in Chinese sources.) (/ˈkɒŋɡɪræd/; Mongolian: ᠬᠣᠩᠭᠢᠷᠠᠳ Хонгирад; Kazakh: Қоңырат, romanized: Qoñyrat; Chinese: 弘吉剌; pinyin: Hóngjílá) was a major division of the Mongol tribes. Their homeland was located in the vicinity of Lake Hulun in Inner Mongolia and Khalkha River in Mongolia, where they maintained close ties with the ruling dynasties of northern China. Because the various Khongirad clans never united under a single leader, the tribe never rose to great military glory. Their greatest notability comes from being the chief consort clan of the ruling house of Genghis Khan's Mongol Empire. Genghis Khan's great-grandmother, mother (Hoelun), and chief wife (Börte) were all Khongirad, as were many Mongol empresses and khatuns of descent.

During the Yuan dynasty they were given the title Lu Wang ("Prince of Lu"; Chinese: 鲁王), and a few Khongirad migrated west into the territory of modern Uzbekistan and Turkistan Region where they became governors of Khwarazm and were known as the Sufi dynasty. After a brief period as independent rulers, they were subjected by Timur.

== Etymology ==
According to Mongolian historians, the name derives from the words "khun" (swan) and "ard" (people; lit. tribe of the swan). The swan is one of the totems of Mongolian peoples, such as the Buryats. The name of this tribe first appeared in paragraph 61 of the Secret History of the Mongols in the form "ongirad". The ethnonym "Khonggirat (Hungirat)" shares a common origin with the Buryat ethnonym Khongoduurs. G. R. Galdanova identifies the ethnonym "khongodor" with the medieval "hungirat", due to the possible transposition of "-rat" and "-dor". Later, A. Angarkhayev, agreeing with Ts. R. Tsydenzhapov's interpretation, suggested a simplified form from "khon (khong)" and "arad" → "khongarad" ~ "khongirad" ~ "khongodor". S. P. Baldayev believed the ethnonym derived from khon — "noble bird" and "goodor" — "chicks of a noble bird". According to D. S. Dugarov, the basis were the Turkic "khun/khon (kun)" — "sun" and "khuba" — "swan", carried by remnants of the once powerful Xiongnu. Sh. R. Tsydenzhapov proposed that this ethnonym derived from the swan totem "khun" during the Xiongnu era, with its modern phonetic form developed from "khun" — "swan".

Uzbek researchers believe the word "Qo'ng'irot" originated from the merger of the words "qo'ng'ir" and "ot". Kh. Daniyarov writes that, according to some sources, the word is actually Mongolian and means "qoraqarg'a" (black crow).

B. Z. Nanzatov compares the Mongolian word "khongor" with the Old Turkic "qoŋur". According to his theory, the ethnonyms "khonggirat, Khongoduurs, konyrat" all derive from the Turko-Mongolian term "khongor" ~ "qoŋur", denoting an animal's coat color — specifically reddish, chestnut, brown, or dun, as well as buckskin and light reddish. Another folk etymology suggests the tribal name derived from "Qoŋyr" and "At", meaning "brown horse" in Turkic.

According to Ayuudain Ochir, the ethnonym "khongirad, khonkhirad, khonkhereyed" derived, like the ethnonym Kerait (khereyed, khereid), from the name of the raven totem. Mongols call one species of large raven "khon kheree".

== History ==
The Khongirad are often identified as the descendants of the ancient Wuku/Wugu tribe in Tang Dynasty records. The tribe's own origin myth claims that they were descended from three brothers born of a golden vessel—Jurluq Mergen, Quba Shira, and Tusbu Da'u. The descendants of these brothers formed the Hongirad tribe, but feuds quickly splintered the tribe and gave rise to the offshoot tribes of the Ikires, Olkhonud, Karanut, Gorlos, and Qongliyuts. Only the descendants of Jurluq Mergen retained the tribal name of Hongirad. One of the most famous Hongirad ancestors was Miser Ulug, an Onggirat Hercules who was super-humanly strong and often slept for days at a time.

Many names of the 12th century's Hongirads and their subtribes have Mongol origin:

- Dei Setsen — tsetsen (wise)
- Jurluq Mergen — zörlög (path) mergen (wise). (See Merkit)
- Quba Shira — goo (beautiful) shar (yellow). In the 1680s Zasagt Khan of the Khalkha Mongolia was Shar (Shira). (See Alan Gua).

=== Subtribes ===
- Khongirad — khun (swan), khungiin (swan's), ard (person); swan person. Swan is one of Mongol totems. (See Oirats).
- Qongliyuts — Khonkhluud; khonkh (bell), "iud" or "uud" is plural suffix.
- Gorlos — Modern Southern Mongol subgroup
- Ikires — Ikhires: ikh (great), ikhes (chief, noble)
- Karanut — Kharnuud: khar (black), "iud" or "uud" is plural suffix
- Olkhunut — Olkhunuud, "uud" is plural suffix. They have three subgroups:
  - Alag aduutan: alag (piebald), aduutan (horse herder); piebald horse herder.
  - Shar khonit: shar (yellow), khoni (sheep); yellow sheep breeder.
  - Ulaan zalaat: ulaan (red), zalaa (tassel); person who wears hat with red tassel. Today, Mongols call themselves "red-tasseled Mongols" because Mongols wear hat with red tassel and they adore fire. Fire is a general symbol of eternal growth, wealth, and success and a figure of fire is used in Mongolian flag, coat of arms and Soyombo symbol. The three tongues of the flame represent the past, present, and future.

Shamanic practices continue in present-day Mongol culture.

== Relationship with the Mongols: The Legend of Ergune Khun ==
According to Mongol legend, two warriors named Kiyan (Khiyad) and Negus (Mongolian: Nokhos, dog or wolf) were defeated in battle and forced to seek shelter in an enclosed valley called Ergune khun ("steep cliffs"). After several generations the descendants of these heroes became too numerous for the valley to support, but no one remembered the way out. A blacksmith came up with a solution—they would create their own way out by melting an exposed iron vein that existed in one of the encircling mountains. Building a massive fire and stoking it with 70 large bellows, the trapped clan did just that and succeeded in creating a passage to the outside world. Once free, the people of Kiyan and Negus went on to create several tribes, including the Mongols and the Hongirads (whose susceptibility to gout was explained by the "fact" that their ancestors were the first to flee Ergene Qun, so they burned their feet on the hot iron).

== Consort tribe ==
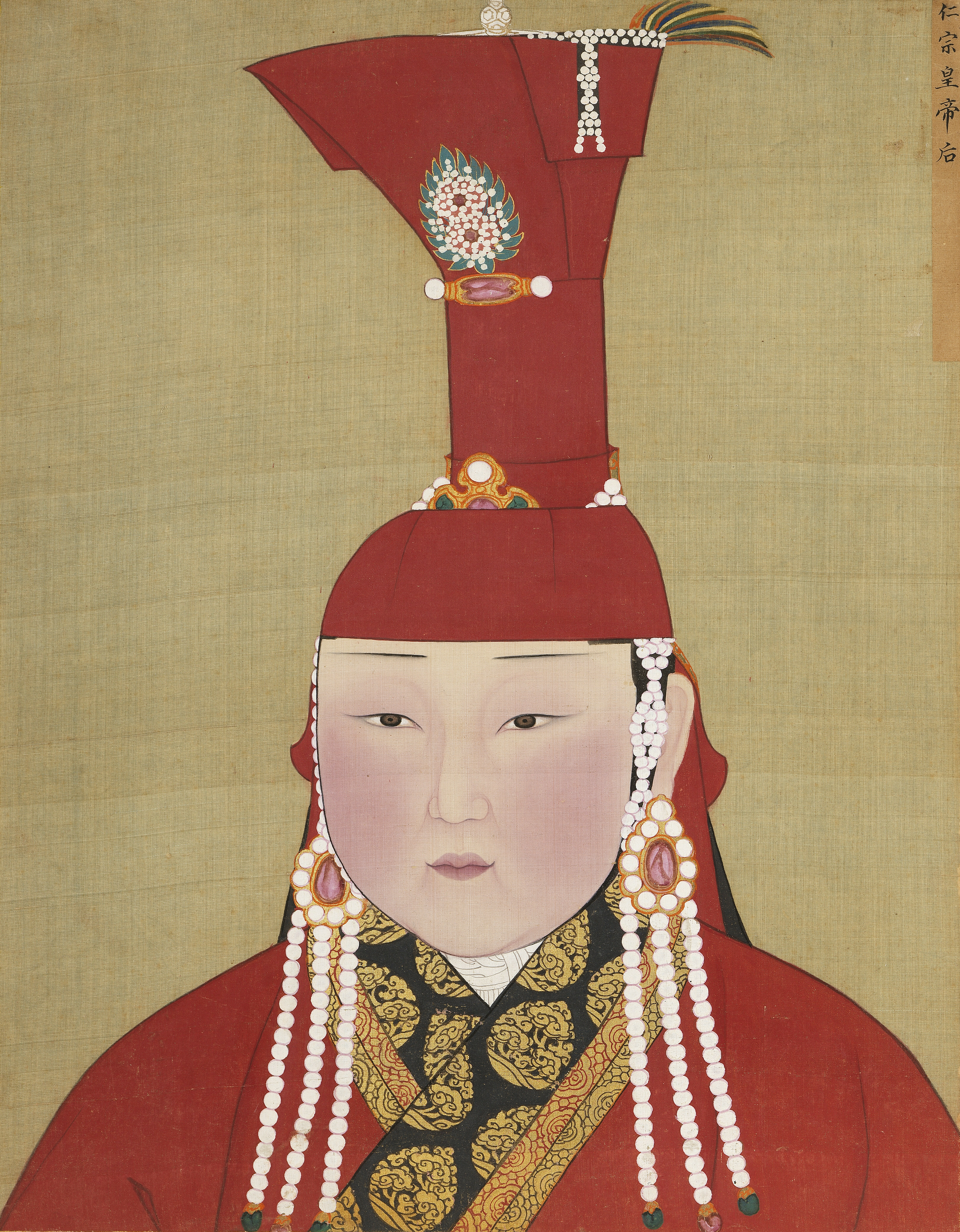
Empress Radnashiri (died 1322) was from the Khunggirad

In addition to having a shared ancestry with the Mongols in general, the Hongirads also shared ancestors with the Mongol royal line, whose originator, Alan Qo'a, was a woman of the Kharlas clan, an offshoot of the Khongirad founded by the legendary Miser Ulug. Down to the 12th century, Mongol rulers such as Khabul Khan and his great-grandson Genghis Khan were still taking Khongirad wives. Yesugei Ba'atur, the father of Genghis Khan, was not a high ranking Mongol leader, but even he secured himself an Onggirat wife by stealing one from another man. The wives of most rulers of the Yuan Dynasty and Golden Horde were also from the Hongirad. That is why they held enormous powers behind the courts in both states. They forced the rulers of the Golden Horde to make peace with Kublai in 1280s and convinced Tokhta Khan to accept supremacy of the Great Khan in 1304. The Hongirad under queen Dagi and Temüder, the Minister of the Secretariat, reached their political peak in the Yuan Dynasty, the principal state of 4 khanates, during the reign of Gegeen Khan Shidebala (r.1321-1323). They built Yingchang city in modern Inner Mongolia in 1271.

After the death of the last Yuan emperor, Toghan Temur, who lost his imperial status in China and other Mongol khanates, a body of the Khongirat and Olkhunut (Borte's clan) surrendered to the Ming Dynasty in 1371. Meanwhile, the Khongirad, belonged to the southern Khalkha tumen in modern Inner Mongolia and Olkhunuts lived in modern Khovd Province.

== Transoxiana ==
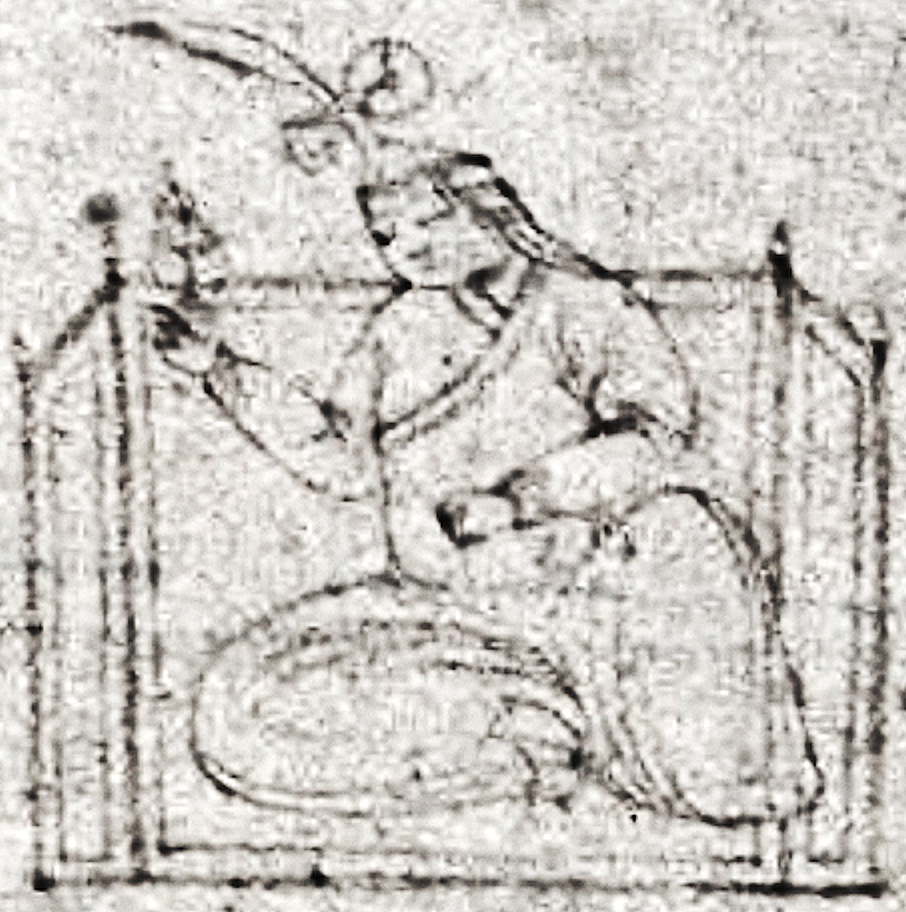
Contemporary portrait of princess Khanzade (c. 1360 – 1411), daughter of Aq Sufi, founder of the Sufi dynasty, granddaughter of Jani Beg, and a direct descendant of Genghis Khan. Timurid genealogy 1405-1409 (Topkapi Sarayi Müzesi, H2152)

During the 18th century, the basins of the Amu Darya and Syr Darya passed under the control of three Uzbek khanates claiming legitimacy in their descent from Genghis Khan. These were, from west to east, the Khongirad based on Khiva in Khwārezm (1717–1920), the Manghud in Bukhara (1753–1920), and the Mings in Kokand (Qǔqon; c. 1710–1876). The Sufi Dynasty (1359–1388) which was founded by the Qongirat elites in Khwārezm ruled their own state under the Jochids and Timur. The Qongirat Inaks became de facto rulers of the Khanate of Khiva in 18th century and their descendants assumed the title of khan themselves in 1804. On 2 February 1920, Khiva's last khan, Sayid Abdullah, abdicated before its territory was finally incorporated into the Soviet Union in 1924.

Descendants are found among the people in Mongolia and the Yugurs in Gansu, China, and little bit in the Karakalpaks and the Uzbegs.

== Kazakhstan ==
Currently a Kazakh tribe of the Middle Juz named Qoñyrat (or less commonly Qoñğyrat) are considered descendants of Khongirad (Ongrat, Kungrat in (Gumilev, n.d). Around the beginning of the 20th century CE, the Kazakh Qongyrats lived mainly in what is now Turkistan Region (formerly South Kazakhstan Region), especially in the vicinity of the city of Turkistan. This region borders Uzbekistan, and a majority of the local population has at times been recorded as Uzbek; the part of the region in which the Kazakh Qongırats were concentrated was located between the Sır River and the lower reaches of the Chu River where it disappears in the steppe. The Qongyrat tribe of Kazakhs are notable for the extremely high frequency among them (64/95 = 67.37%) of Y-DNA that belongs to haplogroup C-M407, a clade that otherwise has been observed with greatest frequency among Buryats (117/217 = 53.9%, 40/80 = 50.0%, 86/298 = 28.9% (mostly northern and western)) and other indigenous peoples of Buryatia (15/28 = 53.6% Sojots, 27/51 = 52.9% Hamnigans). Members of C-M407 also have been found with lower frequency among Mongols in Mongolia, Kalmyks (especially Dörwöds), Manchus in China, and Yakuts in Sakha Republic.

== Rule of Khiva ==
They ruled the Khiva khanate from 1763 to 1920.

=== House of Qungrat of Khiva ===
House of Qungrat

Khiva Khanate

Ishim
Muhammad-Amin
Awad
Iltuzar r. 1804–1806	Qutluq-Murad	Muhammad-Rahim I r. 1806–1825
Ibadullah	Allah-Quli r. 1825–1842	Muhammad r. 1855–1865
Abdullah II r. 1855–1855	Qutluq-Murad r. 1855–1855	Rahim-Quli r. 1842–1845	Muhammad-Amin r. 1845–1855	Muhammad-Rahim II r. 1865–1910
Isfandiyar II r. 1910–1918	Abdullah III r. 1918–1920

== Sources ==
- Bosworth, Clifford Edmund (1978). "Khwarazm". The Encyclopedia of Islam. Vol. IV. Leiden: E. J. Brill. ISBN 90-04-05745-5.
