= Battle of Kuvan-Darya =

Battle between the Khanate of Khiva and Kazakhs

- Part of the Zhankozhi Nurmukhamedov's struggle against Khiva and Kokand (1843–1851)
| Date | 1845 |
| Location | Syrdarya |
| Result | Victory of Zhankozha |

Belligerents
| Syrdarya Kazakhs | Khanate of Khiva |

Commanders and leaders
| Zhankozha Nurmukhamedov | Unknown |

The Battle of Kuvan-Darya was a military confrontation between the Kazakhs led by Zhankozha Nurmukhamedov and the Khanate of Khiva. The Kazakh batyr Zhankozha, who led several clans of Kazakhs living along the Syr Darya, had long fought against the Kokand and Khiva forces. In 1843, he destroyed a Khivan stronghold on the Kuvan-Darya, and two years later, in 1845, he defeated a large Khivan detachment 3000 fighters that had arrived to restore the fortress. In 1846, Zhankozha joined forces with Kenesary to fight against the Kokand forces. Together, they captured Sozak, but disagreements soon arose between them, leading the batyr to act independently. For Zhankozha, the primary enemy remained Khiva, while Kenesary was focused on seeking revenge against Kokand.
