= Sayyid Muhammad (Khan of Khiva) =

Khan of Khiva from 1856 to 1864

Sayyid Muhammad Khan (Turki and Persian: سید محمد خان; 1823–1864), was the 10th ruler of the Uzbek Kungrat dynasty in the Khanate of Khiva. He reigned between 1856 and 1864.

== Biography ==
In 1855, the 7th ruler of Khiva, Muhammad Amin Bahadur Khan, tragically died in a battle against the Turkmen Teke tribe near Serakhs. After his death, power in Khiva passed to his son Abdullah Khan (1855), who, however, also died in the battle against nomadic tribes six months later. Then his brother Kutlugh Murad Khan (1837–1856) ascended the throne but was soon assassinated.

In 1856, their great-uncle Sayyid Muhammad Khan, the son of the 4th ruler of Khiva Mohammed Rahim Khan, came to power in the Khiva Khanate, and he was able to restore order in the state and prevent further attacks by the Turkmen nomadic tribes.

During his reign, diplomatic relations were maintained with Russia, the Ottoman Empire, Iran, and Afghanistan. In 1858, the Russian envoy Nikolay Pavlovich Ignatyev visited Khiva. In 1863, Said Muhammad Khan also received the famous Hungarian traveler Ármin Vámbéry.

During the reign of Sayyid Muhammad Khan, an official reception hall (Kurinishkhana), was built in Khiva. During these years, the historian Agahi wrote the history of Khorezm. Among the famous people under his reign was the composer, calligrapher and painter Kamil Khorezmi (1825–1899).

After his death in 1864, his son Muhammad Rahim Khan II, who had received a careful education, succeeded him.

== Sources ==
- Gulomov Kh. G., Diplomatic relations of the states of Central Asia with Russia in the 18th - first half of the 19th century. Tashkent, 2005
- Gulyamov Ya. G., History of irrigation of Khorezm from ancient times to the present day. Tashkent. 1957
- History of Uzbekistan. T.3. T., 1993.
- History of Uzbekistan in sources. Compiled by B.V. Lunin. Tashkent, 1990
- History of Khorezm. Edited by I. M. Muminov. Tashkent, 1976

Preceded by Kutlug Murad Khan	Khan of Khiva; 1856–1864	Succeeded by Muhammad Rahim Khan II
