= Zynhary (village) =

Village in Turkmenistan

Zynhary Zynhary obasy
- Village
- Location in Turkmenistan
- Coordinates: 38°06′37″N 64°44′43″E
- Country: Turkmenistan
- Province: Lebap Province
- District: Halaç District
- Rural Council: Esenmeňli geňeşligi

Population (2022 official census)
  - Total: 2,311
- Time zone: UTC+5

Zynhary is a village in Halaç District, Lebap Province, Turkmenistan. It is located circa 12 km northwest of Halaç. In 2022, the village had a population of 2,311 people.

== Etymology ==
The place is named after a famous local poet, Abdyrahym Zynhary (1791–1880), whose work broached subjects such as love, life, or moral values.

== Culture ==
Near can be found Idris-baba Madrasa, north of the village of Magtymguly that lies northeast of Zynhary.

== Rural Council ==
Zynhary is included in Esenmeňli Rural Council along with three other settlements:

- Esenmeňli, village
- Akýap, village
- Magtymguly, village
- Zynhary, village
