= Eltuzar Muhammad Bahodir Khan =

Khan of Khiva from 1804 to 1806

Eltuzar Muhammad Bahodir Khan (Turki and Persian: محمد بهادر خان; c. 1760–1806), was the third Inak and first Khan of the Kungrat dynasty in the Khanate of Khiva, which covered a western part of today's Uzbekistan and parts of Turkmenistan. He reigned between 1804 and 1806, when he was killed in battle.

== Biography ==
Eltuzar was the son of the Inak Ivaz, on whose death he was appointed as his successor. After six months, he deposed the powerless Khan Abu l-Ghazi Khan III, sent him back to the country of the Kazakhs and told him that he would look for another Khan in his place. Then, he summoned all the notables and told them that he himself would become Khan. Those present consented, and therefore he became the first time Khan of Khiva who did not descend from Genghis Khan.

Eltuzar continued his father's recovery policy: he reformed taxes and strengthened the poll tax system, while developing irrigation. He built new buildings in Khiva. The first year of his reign, he successfully undertook a military expedition against the Yomut Turkmen tribe, who lived in the south of present-day Turkmenistan and in the surroundings of Astrabad.

In 1806, Eltuzar Khan launched an unsuccessful campaign against Haydar bin Shahmurad, Emir of Bukhara, which ended in the defeat of his troops. During the retreat, many of his soldiers drowned while crossing the Amu Darya. Eltuzar himself was able to get into a boat, but when too many of his people tried to board too, the overloaded boat sank and Eltuzar drowned. His brothers Hasan Murad Beg and Jan Murad Beg also died in the battle. Kutlugh Murad Beg was taken prisoner, and only one other brother, Muhammad Rahim, was able to escape and reach Khiva. The famous Chorasmi standard was captured, and numerous distinguished persons were also made prisoners.

Eltuzar was succeeded by his only brother who had returned to Khiva after the battle. He was proclaimed as Mohammed Rahim Khan.

== Sources ==
- Henry Hoyle Howorth. History of the Mongols, from the 9th to the 19th Century. Part II division II. The so-called tartars of Russia and Central Asia. London: Longmans, Green and Co, 1880. Pages 918-920
- Gulyamov Y. G., History of irrigation of Khorezm from ancient times to the present day. Tashkent. 1957
- Gulyamov Y. G., History of the Uzbek SSR. Volume 1. Tashkent, 1967.
- History of Uzbekistan. T.3. T., 1993.

Preceded by Abu l-Ghazi Khan III	Khan of Khiva; 1804–1806	Succeeded by Mohammed Rahim Khan
