= Khongodory =

Khongodory Хонгодоры
- Ulus
- Location within Republic of Buryatia Location within Russia
- Coordinates: 51°50′N 103°03′E
- Country: Russia
- Region: Republic of Buryatia
- District: Tunkinsky District
- Time zone: UTC+8:00

Khongodory (Russian: Хонгодоры; Buryat: Хонгоодор, Khongoodor) is a rural locality (an ulus) in Tunkinsky District, Republic of Buryatia, Russia. The population was 75 as of 2010. There is 1 street.
