= Khanate of Khiva =

1511–1920 state in Central Asia

Khanate of Khiva خیوه خانلیگی (Chagatay) Khivâ Khânligi خانات خیوه (Persian) Khânât-e Khiveh
- 1511–1920
- Flag of Khiva (1917–1920)

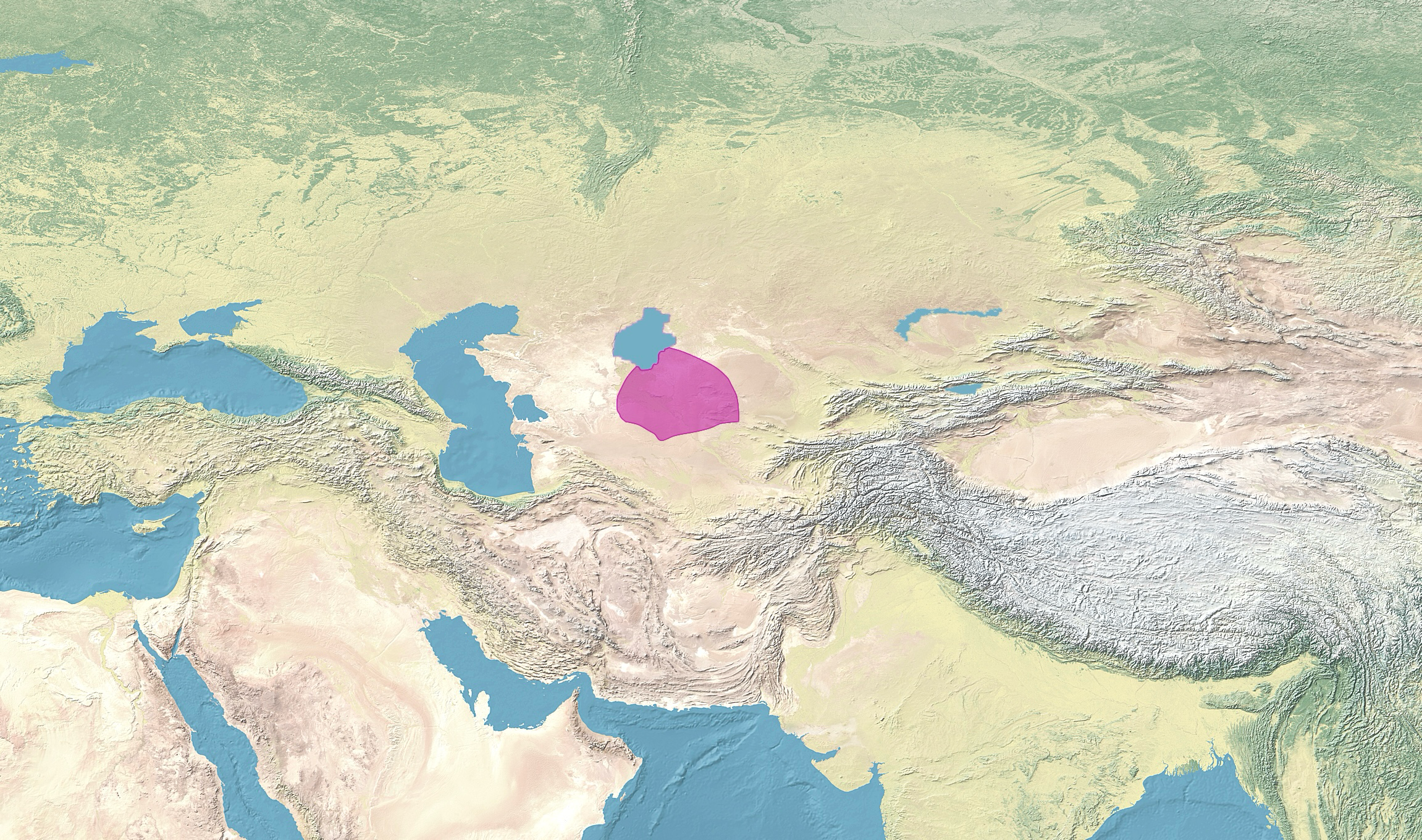
- The Khanate of Khiva (bordered in red), c. 1700.
- Status: Independent khanate (1511–1740; 1747–1873); Vassal state of Afsharid Iran (1740–1747); Russian protectorate (1873–1920)
- Capital: Konye-Urgench (1511—1598); Khiva (1599—1920)
- Common languages: Chagatai language Persian; Turkmen
- Religion: Islam; (official)
- Government: Absolute monarchy
- Khan
  - 1511–1518: Ilbars I (first)
  - 1918–1920: Sayid Abdullah (last)
- History
  - Established: 1511
  - Afsharid conquest: 1740
  - Qungrad dynasty rule: 1804
  - Russian conquest: 12 August 1873
  - Fall of Khiva: 2 February 1920

Area
- 1911: 67,521 km^{2} (26,070 sq mi)

Population
  - 1902: 700,000
  - 1908: 800,000
  - 1911: 550,000
Preceded by	Succeeded by
Timurid Empire	Khorezm People's Soviet Republic
- Today part of: Uzbekistan; Turkmenistan; Kazakhstan

The Khanate of Khiva (Chagatay: خیوه خانلیگی, romanized: Khivâ Khânligi, Persian: خانات خیوه, romanized: Khânât-e Khiveh, Uzbek: Xiva xonligi, Хива хонлиги, Turkmen: Hywa hanlygy, Russian: Хивинское ханство, romanized: Khivinskoye khanstvo) was an Uzbek monarchy that existed in the historical region of Khorezm from 1511 to 1920, except for a period of Afsharid occupation by Nader Shah between 1740 and 1746. Centred in the irrigated plains of the lower Amu Darya, south of the Aral Sea, with the capital in the city of Khiva, its territories covered present-day western Uzbekistan, southwestern Kazakhstan and much of Turkmenistan before the Russian conquest at the second half of the 19th century.

In 1873, the Khanate of Khiva was greatly reduced in size and became a Russian protectorate. The other regional protectorate that lasted until the Revolution was the Emirate of Bukhara. Following the Russian Revolution of 1917, Khiva had a revolution too, and in 1920 the Khanate was replaced by the Khorezm People's Soviet Republic. In 1924, the area was formally incorporated into the Soviet Union and today it is largely a part of Karakalpakstan, Xorazm Region in Uzbekistan, and Daşoguz Region of Turkmenistan.

== Name ==
The terms "Khanate of Khiva" and "Khivan Khanate", by which the polity is commonly known in Western scholarship, are a calque that derive from the Russian exonym: Хивинское ханство, romanized: Khivinskoe khanstvo. The term was first used by the Russians in the second half of the 17th century, or in the 18th century. Locals of the polity did not use this term, and instead referred to it as the vilayet Khwārazm ("country of Khwārazm").

Prior to the 17th/18th centuries, the polity was often called "Urgench" (or "Iurgench" in Russian sources). This name was also sometimes used in Iran and Bukhara, with the designation "Urganji" often being used as the collective name for its inhabitants.

== History ==
=== After 1500 ===
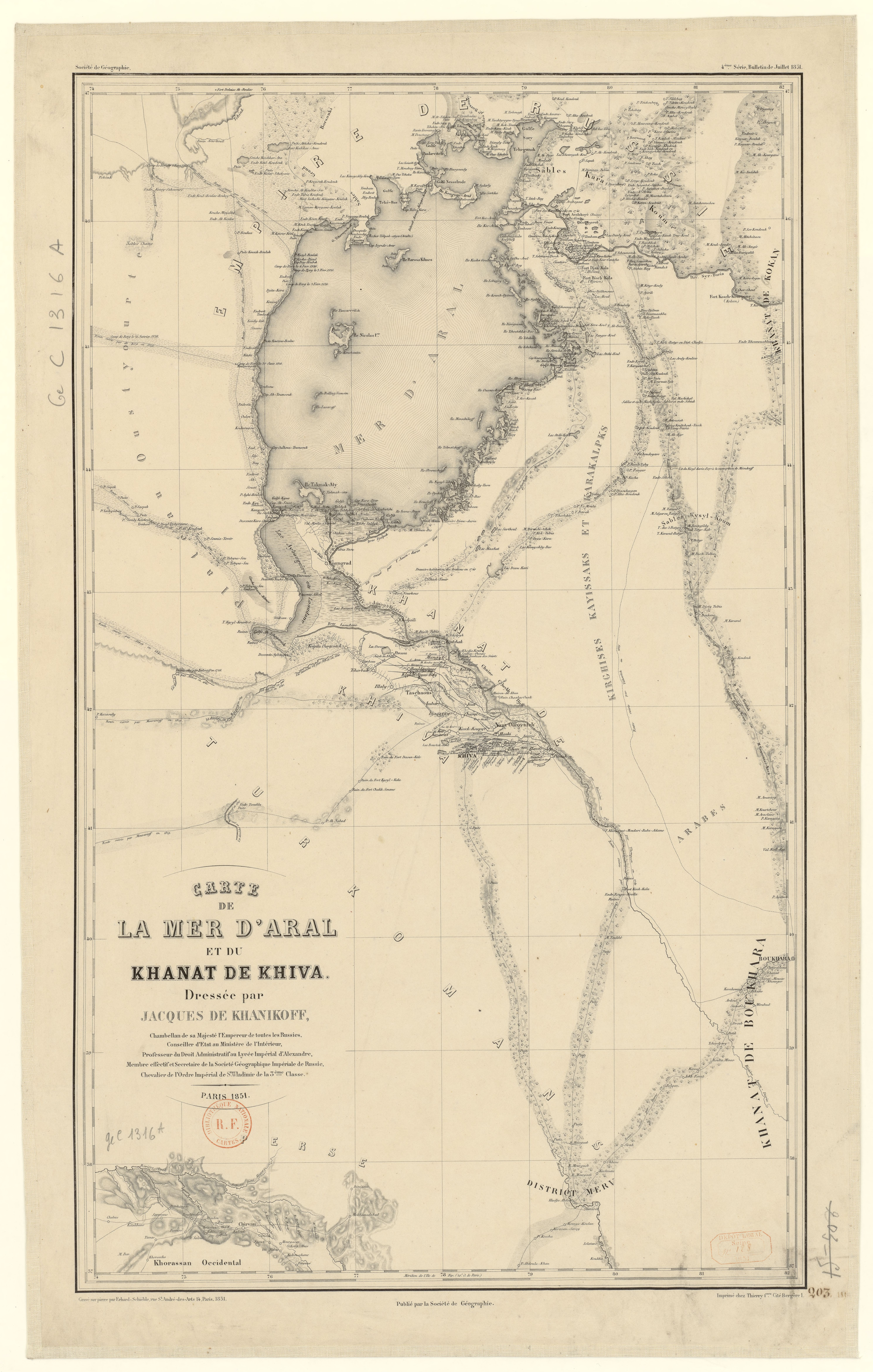
A map of Khiva in 1851

After the capital was moved to Khiva, Khorezm came to be called the Khanate of Khiva (the state had always referred to itself as Khorezm, the Khanate of Khiva as a name was popularized by Russian historians in honor of its capital, Khiva). Some time around 1600, the Daryaliq or west branch of the Oxus dried up causing the capital to be moved south to Khiva from Konye-Urgench. Although based in the Oxus delta, the Khanate usually controlled most of what is now Turkmenistan. The population consisted of agriculturalists along the river, the Turkic Sarts, and nomads or semi-nomads away from the river. It is arbitrary to anachronistically project modern ethnic and national identifications, largely based on Soviet national delimitation policies, on pre-modern societies. The settled population was composed of aristocrats and peasants bound to the land. During the mid-1600s many Persian slaves were captured by Turkmens and a few Russian and Turkic slaves. Before and during this period, the settled area was increasingly infiltrated by Uzbeks from the north, with their Turkic dialects evolving into what is now the Uzbek language, while the original influence of Khorezmian Turkic Language decreased. The swampy area of the lower delta was increasingly populated by Karakalpaks and there were Kazakh nomads on the northern border. The Turkmen nomads paid taxes to the Khan and were a large part of his army, but often revolted. Since the heart of the Khanate was surrounded by semi-desert the only easy military approach was along the Oxus. This led to many wars with the Khanate of Bukhara further up the river (1538–40, 1593, 1655, 1656, 1662, 1684, 1689, 1694, 1806, and others).

Before 1505, Khorezm was nominally dependent on the Timurid Sultan Husayn Mirza Bayqara based in Khorasan. From 1488 Muhammad Shaybani built a large but short-lived empire in southern Central Asia, taking Khorezm in 1505. At nearly the same time, Shah Ismail I was building a powerful Shiite state in Persia. The two consequently clashed in 1510 near Merv with Muhammad killed in the battle and Khorezm shortly occupied. The Shah's religion provoked resistance and in 1511 his garrison was expelled and power passed to Ilbars, who founded the long-lived Arabshahid dynasty. The Arabshaids or Yadigarids were Shaybanids and are sometimes distinguished from the Abulkhayrids, another branch of the family. They are named after Yadigar Sultan who was proclaimed khan north of the Aral Sea about 1458 and from his great-grandfather Arabshah. Bregel places them north of the Aral Sea and lower Syr Darya circa 1400–1500.

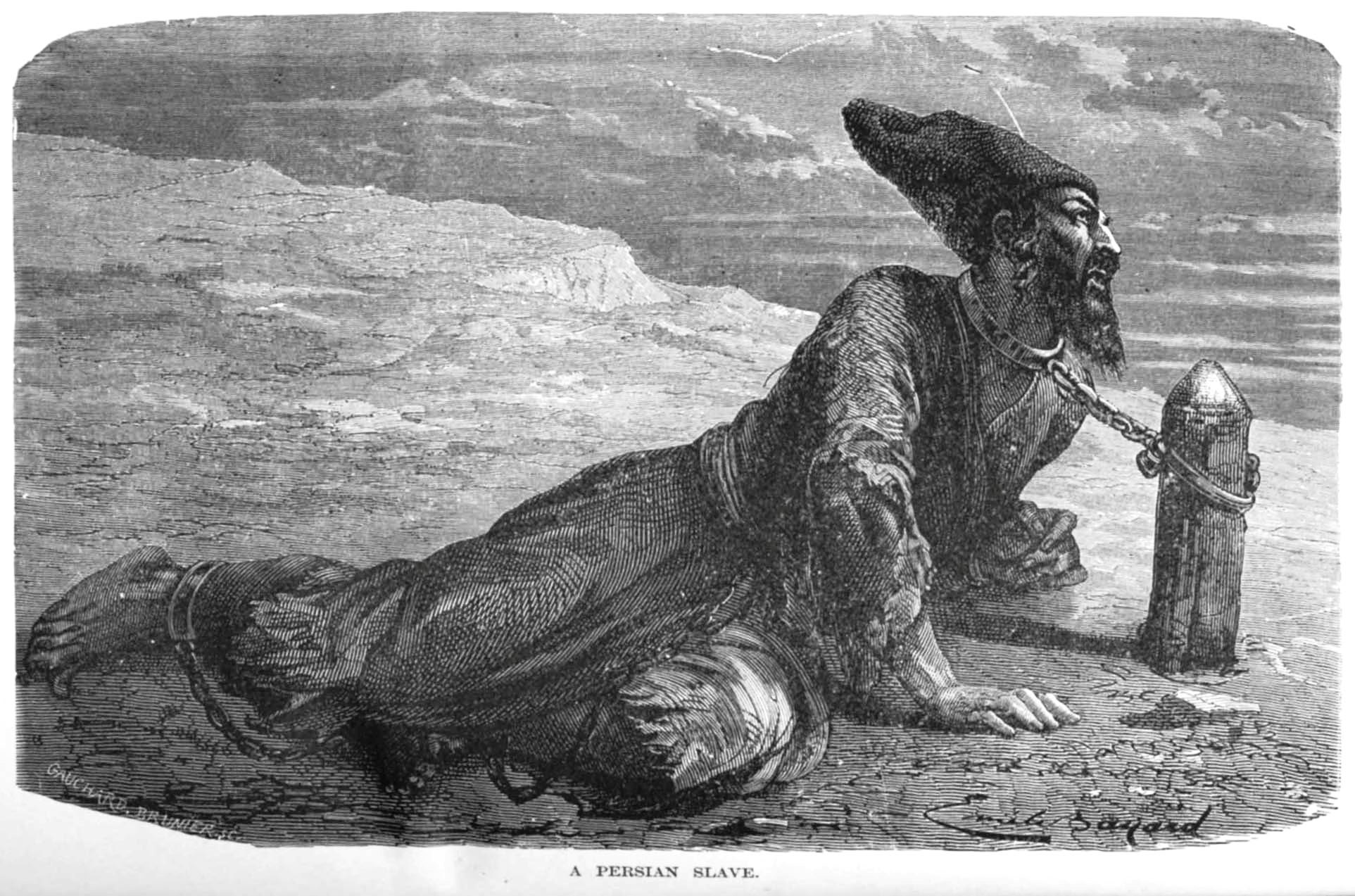
Persian slave in the Khanate of Khiva, 16th century. Painting made in the 19th century.

Around 1540 and 1593, the Khans were driven out by the Bukharans. In both cases they fled to Persia and soon returned. In 1558, Anthony Jenkinson visited Old Urgench and was not impressed. Following Arap Muhammad (1602–23), who moved the capital to Khiva, there was a period of disorder, including an invasion by the Kalmyks, who left laden with plunder. Disorder was ended by Abu al-Ghazi Bahadur (1643–1663) who twice defeated the Kalmyks and wrote a history of Central Asia. His son Anusha Khan (1663–1685) presided over a period of urban growth until he was deposed and blinded. From 1695, Khiva was for some years a vassal of Bukhara which appointed two khans. Shir Gazi Khan (1714–1727), who was killed by slaves, is said to have been the last proper Arabshahid. Khan Ilbars (1728–40) was a Shibanid ruler, son of Shakhniyaz khan who unwisely killed some Persian ambassadors. In a repeat of the Shah Ismail story, Nadir Shah conquered Khiva, beheaded Ilbars and freed some 12,000–20,000 slaves. Next year the Persian garrison was slaughtered, but the rebellion was quickly suppressed. Persian pretensions ended with Nadir's murder in 1747. After 1746, the Qongrat tribe became increasingly powerful and appointed puppet khans. Their power was formalized as the Qongrat dynasty by Iltuzar Khan in 1804. Khiva flourished under Muhammad Rahim Khan (1806–1825) and Allah Quli Khan (1825–1840) and then declined. After Muhammad Amin Khan was killed trying to retake Sarakhs on March 19, 1855, there was a long Turkmen rebellion (1855–1867). In the first two years of the rebellion, two or three Khans were killed by Turkmens.

=== Russian conquest and protectorate ===
Khanate of Khiva in 1900

Russians made five attacks on Khiva. Around 1602, some free Ural Cossacks unsuccessfully raided Khorezm. In 1717, Alexander Bekovich-Cherkassky attacked Khiva from the Caspian Sea. After he won the battle, Shir Ghazi Khan (1715–1728) made a treaty and suggested that the Russians disperse so that they could be better fed. However, after dispersing, they were all killed or enslaved, only a few surviving and escaping to tell the tale. In 1801, an army was sent toward Khiva but was recalled when Paul I was murdered. In the Khivan campaign of 1839, Perovsky tried an attack from Orenburg. The weather was unusually cold and he was forced to turn back after losing many men and most of his camels. Khiva was finally conquered by the Khivan campaign of 1873. The Russians installed Sayyid Muhammad Rahim Bahadur Khan II as the vassal ruler of the region.

The conquest of Khiva was part of the Russian conquest of Turkestan. British attempts to deal with this were called the Great Game. One of the reasons for the 1839 attack was the increasing number of Russian slaves held at Khiva. To remove this pretext Britain launched its own effort to free the slaves. Major Todd, the senior British political officer stationed in Herat (in Afghanistan) dispatched Captain James Abbott, disguised as an Afghan, on 24 December 1839, for Khiva. Abbott arrived in late January 1840 and, although the Khan was suspicious of his identity, he succeeded in talking the Khan into allowing him to carry a letter for the Tsar regarding the slaves. He left on 7 March 1840, for Fort Alexandrovsk, and was subsequently betrayed by his guide, robbed, then released when the bandits realized the origin and destination of his letter. His superiors in Herat, not knowing of his fate, sent another officer, Lieutenant Richmond Shakespear, after him. Shakespear had more success than Abbott: he convinced the khan to free all Russian subjects under his control, and also to make the ownership of Russian slaves a crime punishable by death. The freed slaves and Shakespear arrived in Fort Alexandrovsk on 15 August 1840, and Russia lost its primary motive for the conquest of Khiva, for the time being.

A permanent Russian presence on the Aral Sea began in 1848 with the building of Fort Aralsk at the mouth of the Syr Darya. The Empire's military superiority was such that Khiva and the other Central Asian principalities, Bukhara and Kokand, had no chance of repelling the Russian advance, despite years of fighting. In 1873, after Russia conquered the great cities of Tashkent and Samarkand, General Von Kaufman launched an attack on Khiva consisting of 13,000 infantry and cavalry. The city of Khiva fell on 10 June 1873 and, on 12 August 1873, a peace treaty was signed that established Khiva as a quasi-independent Russian protectorate. The conquest ended the Khivan slave trade. After the conquest of what is now Turkmenistan (1884) the protectorates of Khiva and Bukhara were surrounded by Russian territory.

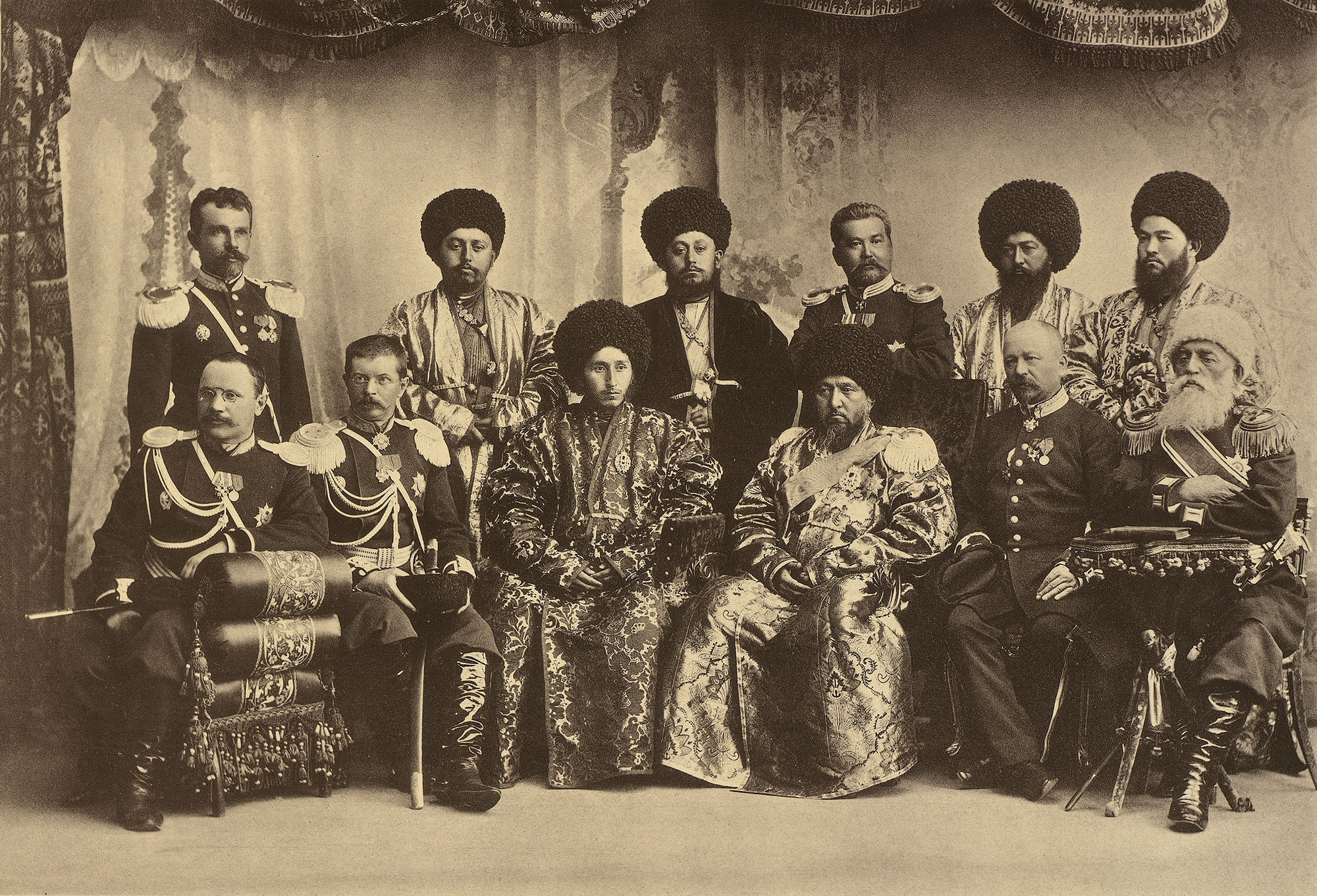
Muhammad Rahim Khan II (third from the right) and his officials at the coronation of Nicholas II

Khiva's status as a Russian protectorate initially had little effect on its internal affairs. The Russian military was not stationed in Khiva, and railroads were not built in the country, nor were Russian courts or customs buildings. While a few thousand Russians settled in Urgench, they did not receive separate services from the native population. The Khanate of Khiva was less wealthy and of interest to Russia than the Emirate of Bukhara which had also been made a protectorate during the Russian conquest. As such it drew much less criticism, and played less of a part in the national politics of the Russian Empire. Despite the relative non-intervention of Russia, especially in military matters, the Khanate of Khiva was still beholden to the state. Per the treaty, the Khanate was obligated to pay up to 200,000 Rubles in war indemnities every year, a debt only paid off in 1900 due to the Khanate falling behind on payments. The Khanate was also pressured by Russia to create irrigation projects that would benefit them, which stoked conflict between Khiva and the Turkmens.

In 1910, Muhammad Rahim Khan II died, and was succeeded by his son Isfandiyar Khan. During this time, critiques were being raised of the poor state of infrastructure, justice, and critically cotton production. To this end, infringing on the autonomy of Khiva to increase production and better the country was seen as justified. Upon Isfandiyar's accession to the throne in 1911, he was pressured by Russia to introduce several reforms, including the creation of new financial systems, infrastructure modernizations, and the establishment of hospitals and elementary schools. Isfandiyar primarily left governance up the ministers under the liberal Seyid Islam-khodja, who supported these reforms and attempted to implement them. However, they received significant opposition from Yomut Turkmens and few were actually put into effect.

The financial reforms greatly increased the taxes placed on Turkmens, inflaming the existing dispute over irrigation. After an influential Turkmen was assassinated by Khivan officials in 1912, a full revolt broke out. Islam-khodja proposed Khiva compromise with the Turkmens, but was sidelined by the war minister Sheikh Nazar-beg, who convinced Isfandiyar to let him lead a punitive expedition. The Turkmen forces were strongly fortified, and fought off the Khivan expedition until the arrival of Russian Cossacks convinced them to surrender. Islam-khodja led the peace talks, ending the tax but imposing a fine, and taking the leaders as hostages. As a result, Isfandiyar assassinated Islam-khodja soon after. Russia strongly opposed the leniency of the peace terms.

After World War I began, the commandant of the Syr-Darya military district and several other Russian military leaders extorted over 250,000 rubles from Isfandiyar. While the money purportedly went to the war effort, a large majority was pocketed by the leaders. During this time, Fyodor Martson was appointed acting governor-general of Turkestan. While he took bribes from Isfandiyar, he would continually favored Turkmens in political disputes. Isfandiyar raised taxes to pay for the expenses, once again flaming conflicts with the Turkmens.

=== Civil war and Soviet Republic ===
Flag used by the Khanate during the civil war (1917–1922)

After the 1917 Bolshevik seizure of power in the October Revolution, anti-monarchists and Turkmen tribesmen joined forces with the Bolsheviks at the end of 1919 to depose the khan. By early February 1920, the Khivan army under Junaid Khan was completely defeated. On 2 February 1920, Khiva's last Kungrad khan, Sayid Abdullah, abdicated and a short-lived Khorezm People's Soviet Republic (later the Khorezm SSR) was created out of the territory of the old Khanate of Khiva, before it was finally incorporated into the Soviet Union in 1924, with the former khanate divided between the new Turkmen SSR and Uzbek SSR. Following the collapse of the Soviet Union in 1991, these became Turkmenistan and Uzbekistan respectively. Today, the area that was the khanate has a mixed population of Uzbeks, Karakalpaks, Turkmens, and Kazakhs.

== Economy ==
The economy of the Khivan Khanate rested on a combination of irrigated agriculture, pastoralism, and long‑distance trade, each reinforcing the other and sustaining the khanate's position in Central Asia. Along the fertile banks of the Amu Darya, fields of wheat, barley, rice, melons, and cotton were cultivated, while orchards produced fruits that supplied both local markets and distant caravans. These harvests depended on an elaborate network of irrigation canals, some of which dated back to earlier Khorezmian states but were repaired and expanded under successive khans, ensuring that the desert margins could be transformed into productive farmland.

Beyond the irrigated zones, Turkmen and Karakalpak groups maintained herds of sheep, horses, and camels on the steppe margins, providing wool, hides, and transport animals that were essential to both the economy and the military.

Khiva's location on the caravan routes linking Central Asia, Persia, and Russia gave it a commercial importance out of proportion to its size. Merchants brought silk, cotton, carpets, and agricultural produce to exchange for Russian manufactured goods, Persian textiles, and Indian spices, and the khans profited by levying taxes on caravans, agricultural output, and artisan workshops. These revenues not only supported the court and the military but also reinforced Khiva's role as a trading center whose prosperity was tied to both the steppe and the settled lands of Central Asia.

Slavery was widespread in Central Asia, and Khiva was a significant part of the regional slave trade. Slaves were captured in raids, taken prisoner during battles, or were sold by their parents during famines, and then transported to Khivan markets. Slaves played a diverse role in Khiva's economy, and served in a wide range of occupations. They were employed based on their talents, and were not restricted to any one task. They were a major section of agricultural labor, both working fields and processing grains. They were also employed in supportive roles to the army, education, entertainment, and accounting. The slave trade was also a source of revenue for the Khivan government, as the sale of slaves, plunder during slave raids, and a slave purchasing their freedom were all taxed. The slave trade ended with the Russian conquest of Khiva. After capturing the city, Konstantin von Kaufmann forced Muhammad Rahim Khan II to release an edict emancipating all slaves within the country, followed by a provision in the treaty between Russia and Khiva banning the slave trade. However, other systems of corvee labor were not abolished, and may have continued after the end of slavery.

== Culture ==
Khiva's culture reflected a synthesis of Turkic, Persian, and Islamic traditions, with Chagatai/Uzbek widely used in administration and literature alongside Persian in scholarship and poetry. Religious life was anchored in Sunni Islam (Hanafi jurisprudence), supported by mosques, madrasas, and endowed institutions that structured education and public piety.

Manuscript production and court historiography were notable: Abu al‑Ghazi Bahadur Khan authored the Shajare‑i Turk and Shajare‑i Tarākime in Chagatai, while later Khivan historians such as Munis and Agahi composed Firdaus‑ul‑Iqbal, documenting rulers, campaigns, and administration. Khiva's court actively translated and adapted Persianate works into Turkic, a deliberate program to reshape court culture and broaden access to literature in the local language.

Urban crafts and decorative arts flourished in the walled city of Itchan Kala, where palaces, mosques, and minarets featured glazed tilework, woodcarving, and geometric ornament, forming a distinctive architectural profile that remains visible today. Textile production (especially cotton and silk), calligraphy, and miniature painting were sustained by elite patronage and artisan guilds, linking cultural expression to the khanate's trading economy.

Oral traditions and steppe heritage coexisted with urban scholarship: Turkic epic storytelling persisted among Turkmen and other frontier groups, while court poets wrote panegyrics in Uzbek and Persian, creating a bilingual literary milieu that bridged nomadic and sedentary identities. Social stratification aligned with this cultural blend, with an Uzbek ruling elite, Persian‑speaking urban artisans and merchants, and Turkmen and Karakalpak communities maintaining semi‑nomadic lifeways on the khanate's margins.

The first significant settlement of Europeans in the Khanate was a group of Mennonites who migrated to Khiva in 1882. The German-speaking Mennonites had come from the Volga region and the Molotschna colony under the leadership of Claas Epp Jr. The Mennonites played an important role in modernizing the Khanate in the decades prior to the October Revolution by introducing photography, resulting in the development of Uzbek photography and filmmaking, more efficient methods for cotton harvesting, electrical generators, and other technological innovations.

== Military ==
The Khivan Khanate's military rested on tribal cavalry drawn primarily from Uzbek lineages, reinforced by Turkmen auxiliaries and irregular levies raised through obligations tied to land grants and patronage. Command was exercised through tribal leaders and court officials who mobilized mounted units for frontier defense, punitive raids, and campaigns aimed at securing caravan routes, irrigation assets, and tributary territories. Administrative documents and chronicle materials indicate that land and privilege assignments (including forms analogous to suyurghal and iqta) were used to bind service and loyalty, integrating military obligations into the khanate's political economy. Cavalry units were equipped with lances, sabers, and bows, later supplemented by firearms obtained through trade and diplomacy. Fortified sites anchored the defensive system: Khiva's mud‑brick walls and outlying forts guarded canals, crossings, and steppe corridors, forming a layered architecture of control over population movement and commerce. Elite patronage extended to logisticians and scribes who recorded levies, stipends, and campaign outcomes, preserving administrative traces of mobilization and supply across the seventeenth to nineteenth centuries.

Operationally, Khivan rulers directed expeditions against rival steppe groups and neighboring polities to secure captives, livestock, and trade advantages; these actions were closely tied to market structures and border politics. Under rulers such as Muhammad Rakhimkhan I, the court coordinated military and fiscal reforms, leveraging tribal coalitions for campaigns while navigating the constraints of inter‑khanate diplomacy and Russian pressure. The military system's reliance on mounted tribal formations proved resilient for local aims but increasingly mismatched against the artillery, engineering, and logistical superiority of imperial forces pressing into Central Asia.

In the nineteenth century, Russian operations exposed Khiva's comparative weaknesses in firearms standardization, artillery, and operational integration. After repeated confrontations and punitive expeditions, the fall of Khiva in 1873 marked the khanate's transition into a protectorate, with military prerogatives curtailed and border security subordinated to imperial oversight. The archival footprint of these changes survives unevenly, and recent scholarship cautions that the so‑called “Archive of the Khans of Khiva” does not reflect a centralized record‑keeping regime; rather, documentation appears dispersed, episodic, and assembled retrospectively, complicating efforts to reconstruct the military apparatus in full detail.

== Khans of Khiva (1511–1920) ==
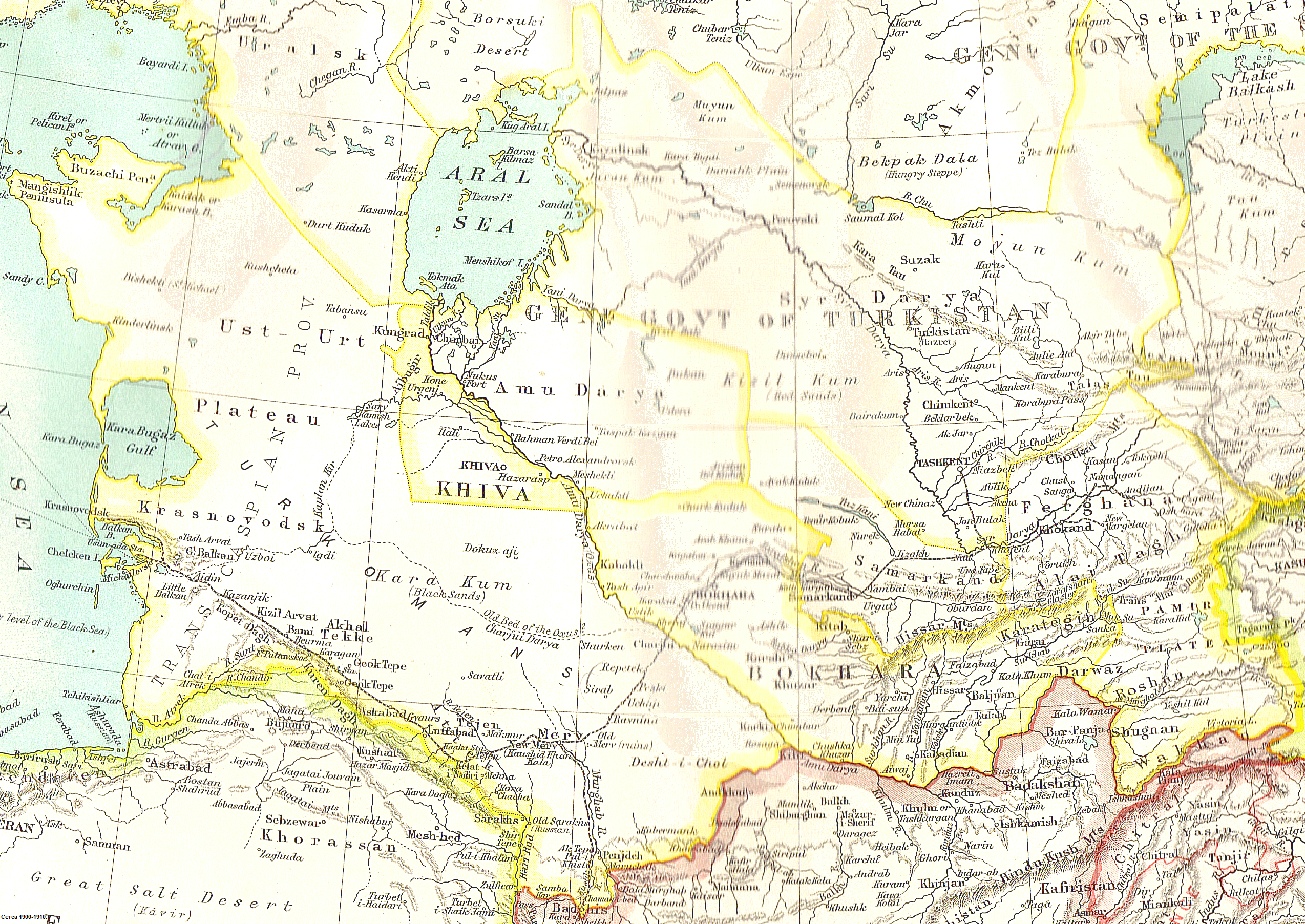
The borders of the Russian imperial territories of Khiva, Bukhara and Kokand during 1902–1903

Data on the Khivan Khans is sparse and sometimes contradictory, especially for the minor khans. Names and dates from Bregel/Muniz which probably gives the best modern scholarship. Short biographies are from Howorth's 1880 book which is old but has biographies of most of the khans.

=== Arabshahid dynasty (Yadigarid Shibanid dynasty, 1511–1804) ===
The Khanate of Khiva and main polities in Asia c. 1710

According to Howorth, the ancestors of Ilbars were Arabshah, Haji Tuli, Timur Sheikh, Yadigar Khan, Bereke, Ilbars. Arabshah's brother was Ibrahim Oghlan, ancestor of the khans of Bukhara.

1. Ilbars I (1511–1518): Enthroned by locals, fought several months to drive the Qizilbash's out, brought in Uzbeks in numbers to raid Khorasan.
2. Sultan Haji (1518–1519): Nephew of Ilbars I, had a short reign; real power in the hands of his cousin Sultan Ghazi.
3. Hasan Quli (1519–1524, ru:1519): cousin of Ilbar I, killed by Ilbars' sons after 4-month siege of Urganch.
4. Sufyan (1529–1535, ru:1519–1522): 'Sofian Khan', second cousin of Ilbars, fought Turkmens on lower Uzboy River, which then had water.
5. Bujugha (1524–1529, ru:1522–1526): brother of Sufyan, raided Safavid Iran, concluded a marriage alliance with Tahmasp I using Sufyan's daughter. Dates from Bregel/Muniz reverse 4 and 5.
6. Avniq (1535–1538, ru:1526–1538): 'Avaneq', brother of Sufyan, blood feud with Ilbars' family and others led to an invasion by Bukhara and his death. Bukharans held Khorezm until they were driven out by his son, Din Muhammed.
7. Qal (1539–1549, ru:1541–1547): 'Khal Khan', son of Avniq, prosperous reign.
8. Aqatay (1549–1557, ru:1547–1557): 'Akatai', brother of Sufyan, fought the sons of several of his brothers, defeated and impaled.
9. Dust Muhammad (1557–1558): 'Dost Khan', son of 5, fought his brother Ish and both were killed.
10. Haji Muhammad I (1558–1602): son of 8, fought Bukhara, which conquered Khiva, 3 years in Safavid Iran, regained homeland, driven out, retook it. Visit of Anthony Jenkinson.
11. Arab Muhammad I (1602–1623, ru:1603–1621): son of 10, Ural Cossack raid defeated, two Kalmyk raids, weak, two sons rebelled, blinded, later killed.
12. Isfandiyar (1623–1643) 12. son of 11, killed his rebellious brothers, pro-Turkmen, anti-Uzbek.
13. Abu al-Ghazi Bahadur (1643–1663): son of 11, khan after defeating Turkmen-Bukharan faction, fought Bukhara and Kalmyks, wrote the Genealogy of Turkmens, an important historical source.
14. Anusha (1663–1685): son of 13, took Bukhara and lost it, three more failures at Bukhara, overthrown and blinded by son Erenk.
15. Between Anusha and Sher Gazi (1685–1714) Bregel and Howorth diverge, as do entries in the Russian Wikipedia. Howorth has A. Muhammed Erenk, failed attack on Bukhara, poisoned, B. Shah Niaz (1687 – after 1700) appointed by Bukhara, letter to czar in 1700. C. Arab Muhammed, letter from Czar in 1703. D. Haji Muhammed Behadur envoy to czar in 1714, E. Yadiger (d. 1714), F. Arank, a Karakalpak, father of Shir Gazi.
16. Khudaydad (1685–1687) ru: 1686–1689, son of Anusha, enthroned at 15, killed.
17. Muhammad Awrang I (1687–1694) ru:1689–1694, son of Anusha, killed by fall from horse.
18. Chuchaq (1694–1697) ru: calls him 'Jochi Khan', descendant of Haji Muhammad I.
19. Vali (1697–1698) ru: descendant of Haji Mukhammad, could not maintain stability and was removed.
20. Ishaq Agha Shah Niyaz (1698–1701) ru: son of Jochi/Chuchaq. Howorth has Shah Niyaz appointed by Bukhara in 1687.
21. Awrang II (1701–1702)
22. ru only:Shakhbakht Khan (1702–03) son of Shah Niyaz, overthrown.
23. ru only:Sayyid Ali Khan (1703) son of Shah Niyaz, reign lasted several days.
24. Musa (1702–1712) ru:1703–04, son of Jochi/Chucaq, fled to Merv.
25. Yadigar I (1712–1713) ru:1704–1714, son of Haji Muhammad I, followed by Sher Ghazi.
26. Awrang III (c. 1713 – c. 1714).
27. Haji Muhammad II (c. 1714) envoy to czar in 1714, grandson of Abul Ghazi.
28. Shir Ghazi (1714–1727) from Bukhara, defeated Alexander Bekovich-Cherkassky, fought rival state on lower delta under Timur Sultan, visited by Florio Beneveni, minor slave rebellion. ru:killed by slaves in same year as Howorth's slave rebellion, descendant of Sultan Gazi (see Sultan Haji).
29. Sarigh Ayghir (1727)
30. Ilbars II (1728–1740), son of Shakhniyaz khan, rejected threat from Nadir Shah, surrendered to him, executed by Nadir because he had killed Nadir's envoys. Nadir freed many slaves.
31. Tahir (1740–1742) cousin of Bukharan khan, appointed by Nadir Shah, killed when Nadir's army was elsewhere.

=== Tore dynasty (Kazakh Khanate dynasty, 1741–1779) ===
1. Nurali I (1742) Kazakh, son of Abul Khair Khan, helped expel Nadir's garrison, fled to steppe before Persian army returned. ru: expelled by Persians.
2. Abu Muhammad (1742) son of Ilbars, appointed by returning Persians
3. Abu al-Ghazi II Muhammad (1742–1747) resisted returning Persians?
4. Ghaib (Kaip Khan) (1747–1758) a Kazakh, enemy of Nurali, driven out, later khan of Little Horde.
5. Between Kaip and 1804 Howorth cannot identify khans. He says that they were titular rulers and often exiled after a few years. Real power was in the hands of Inaks or hereditary prime ministers who were also chiefs on the Qungrat tribe in the lower delta. He lists these Inaks: A. Ishmed bi; B. Muhammed Amin (1755–1782) son of A; C. Ivaz (died 1804), son of B, Dr Blankenagel (1793) could not cure his brother's blindness but left account; D. Iltazar, son of C, after six months expelled last Arabshahid khan.
6. Abdullah Qara Beg (1758)
7. Timur Ghazi (1758–1764)
8. Tawke (1764–1766)
9. Shah Ghazi (1766–1768)
10. Abu al-Ghazi III (1768–1769) ru: son of Kaip, later khan of Karakalpaks, later on lower Syr Darya, died in poverty in 1815.
11. Nurali II (1769)
12. Jahangir (1769–1770) ru: son of Kaip.
13. Bölekey (1770) ru: a Kazakh from lower Syr Darya, expelled above and soon driven out himself.
14. Aqim (first time, 1770–1771)
15. Abd al-Aziz (c. 1771)
16. Artuq Ghazi (c. 1772)
17. Abdullah (c. 1772)
18. Aqim (second time, c. 1772 – c. 1773)
19. Yadigar II (first time, c. 1773–1775)
20. Abu'l Fayz (1775–1779)
21. Yadigar II (second time, 1779–1781)
22. Pulad Ghazi (1781–1783)
23. Yadigar II (third time, 1783–1790)
24. Abu al-Ghazi IV (1790–1802) visit of Russian Dr. Blankenagel in 1793.
25. Abu al-Ghazi V ibn Gha'ib (1802–1804)

=== Qungrat dynasty (1804–1920) ===
==== Qungrat Inaqs ====
- Ishmed bi: Howorth only, information from Muraviev who visited in 1820
- Muhammed Amin Biy: ru: 1763–1790, slowly restored relative peace, defeated Turkmens in 1770 and Bukhara in 1782.
- Avaz-Inak or Ivaz-Inak: ru: 1790–1804, son of above, relative peace and stability, in 1793 rebellion in lower delta suppressed, but area somewhat independent for about 20 years, in 1793 Russian visitor Dr. Egor Blankennagel was unable to cure his brother's blindness, but left a report. According to Howorth, the brother, Fazil bi was 'always consulted' by Avaz and his father.
- Eltuzar-Inak (1804): son of above, made himself khan after a few months.

==== Qungrat Khans ====
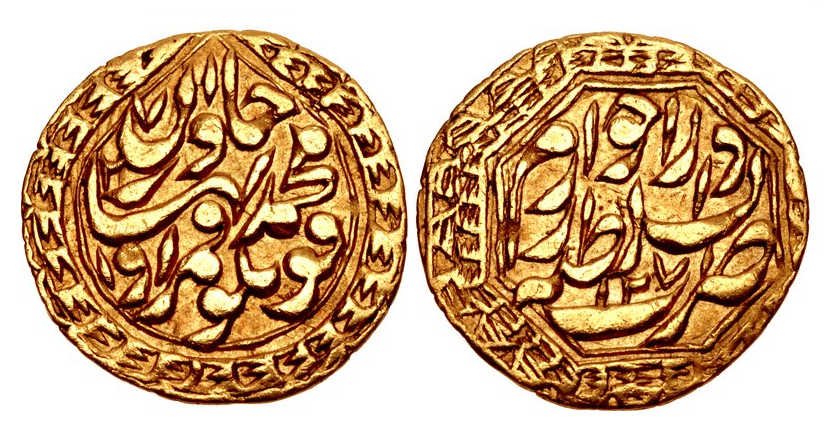
Coinage of Kutlugh Muhammad Murad Bahadur, dated 1856. Khwarezm mint.

- Eltuzar-Inak, son of Ivaz-Inak Biy (1804–1806), exiled the last Arabshahid Khan, said he would find another, collected an army and had himself made Khan, attacked Yomuds towards Asterabad, then allied with them, attacked Bukhara, defeated, fled across the Oxus in a boat, so many people piled onto it that it sank and he was drowned.
- Muhammad Rahim Bahadur I. (1806–1825) son of above, said to be cruel but strong measures restored order, conquered lower delta (ru:1811), subjugated tribes, fought Persia and Bukhara, visited by Muraviev (1820) who left report. Munis Khorezmi wrote history of Khiva used by Bregel.
- Allah Quli Bahadur (1825–1842) son of above, c. 1832 took Merv and Serakhs, Alexander Burnes met his army there, 1839 Russian invasion defeated by cold weather, c. 1840 visited by James Abbott, Richmond Shakespear and Arthur Conolly.
- Muhammad Rahim Quli (1842–1846) son of above, fought tribes south of Merv, brother defeated Bukharan invasion.
- Abu al-Ghazi Muhammad Amin Bahadur (1846 – 19 March 1855), brother of above, took Merv, garrison expelled, retaken, fought Tekes, Russians built forts on the Syr Darya, but Khivans only raided the surrounding areas, campaigned south of Merv, Persians intervened, captured and beheaded because he unwisely pitched his tent on the edge of the camp.
- Abdullah (1855) (ru) grandson of Ittazar's second son (ru:son of Muhammad Amin), enthroned by defeated army, soon killed by Turkmen rebels.
- Kutlugh Muhammad Murad Bahadur (1855–1856) brother of above, fought same rebels, assassinated by rebel ally who pretended to pay homage.
- Sayyid Muhammad (1856 – September 1864) son of second Qungrat khan, civil war, famine and plague, Ignatiev mission (1858), Ármin Vámbéry's visit (1863).
- Muhammad Rahim Bahadur II (Feruz Khan) (10 September 1864 – September 1910) son of above, conquered by Russia in 1873, Khiva became a Russian protectorate.

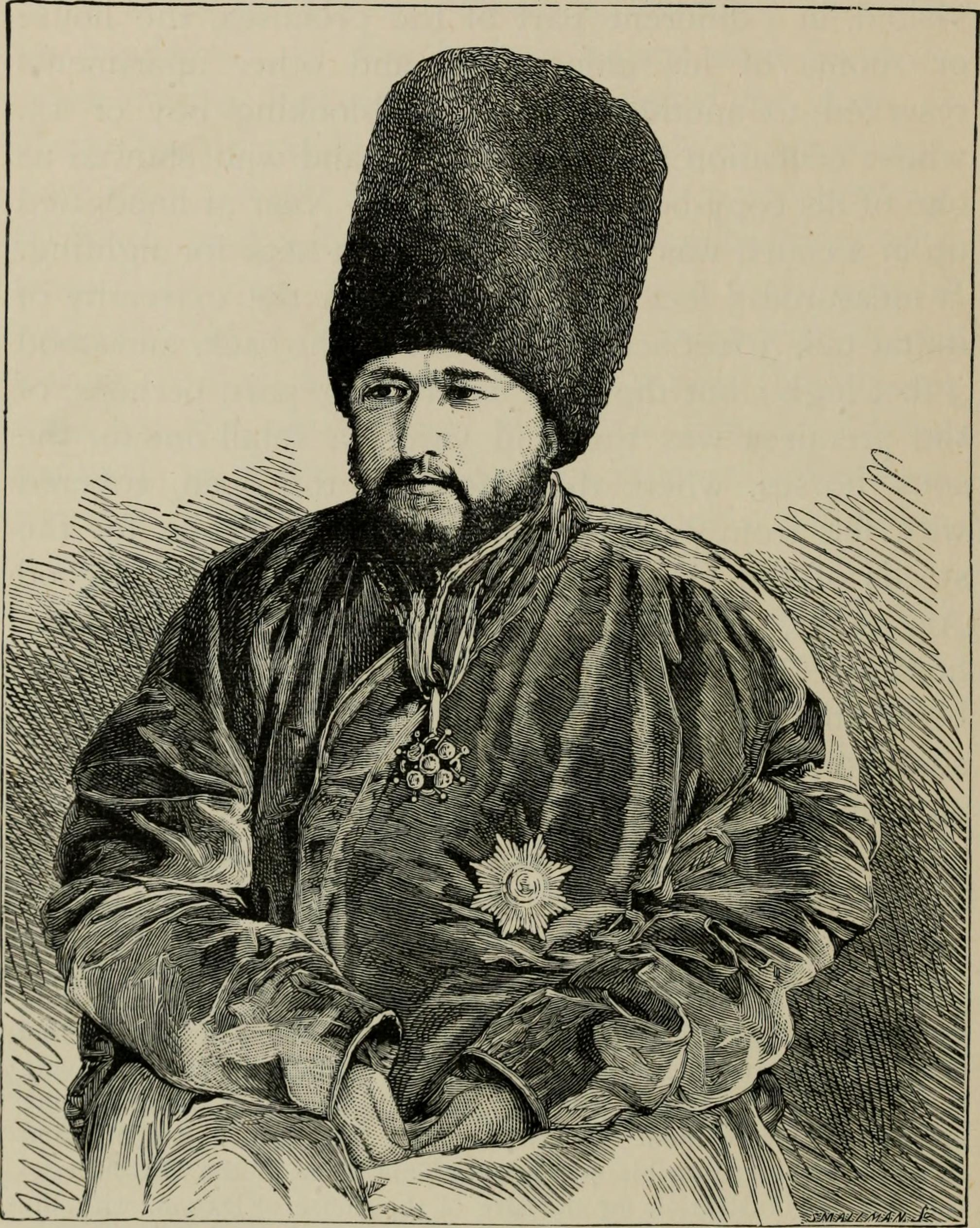
Seid Muhammad Rahim, c. 1880

- Isfandiyar Jurji Bahadur (September 1910 – 1 October 1918) son of the above. Following the Russian Revolution, lost the country to Junaid Khan of the Turkmen Yomut tribe and was executed by him.

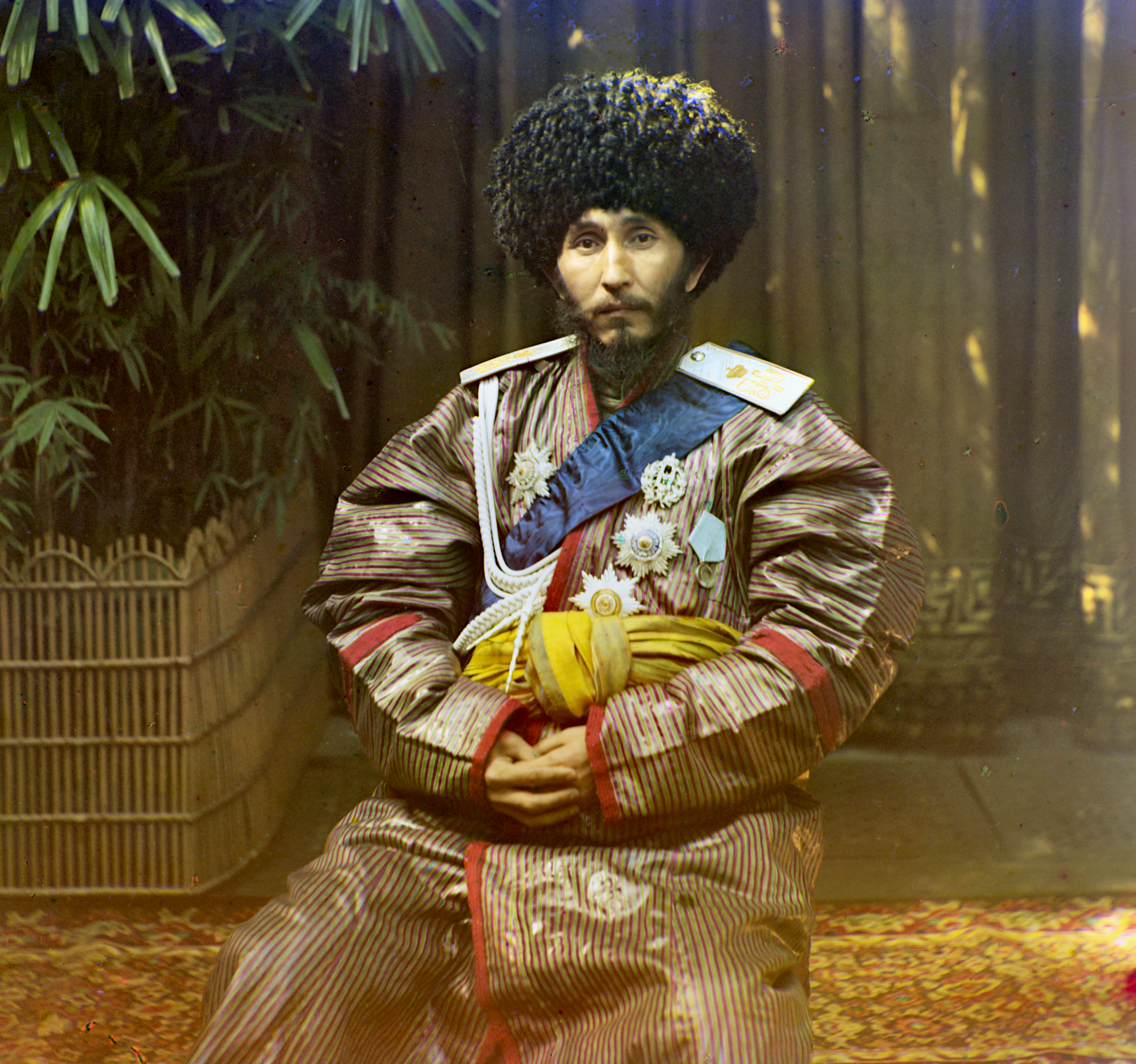
Isfandiyar Jurji Bahadur in 1913

- Sayid Abdullah (1 October 1918 – 1 February 1920) brother of the above. Real power in hands of Junaid Khan.

== See also ==
- Khiva
- Khorezm People's Soviet Republic
- Khorezm
- List of Sunni dynasties
