= Mohammed Rahim Khan =

Khan of Khiva from 1806 to 1825

Mohammed Rahim Khan (Turki and Persian: محمد رحیم خان; 1775–1825), was the second Khan (and fourth ruler) of the Uzbek Kungrat dynasty in the Khanate of Khiva. He reigned from 1806 to 1825.

== Biography ==
He ascended the throne after the tragic death in battle of his elder brother Eltuzar who had reigned from 1804 to 1806. He himself had managed to escape to Khiva, after the failure of the raid against the Emirate of Bukhara in which Eltuzar drowned in the Amu Darya.

=== Internal policy ===
In order to strengthen and develop the power of the State in a country subjected to anarchy for almost a century, Mohammed Rahim Khan launched a series of important reforms. He founded a High Council to improve administration, reformed taxes and brought order to the customs system. He is the first Kungrat sovereign to mint gold and silver coins. The Khanate previously mainly used the currency of the Emirate of Bukhara. He pursued an economic development policy, in particular by improving and developing the irrigation system.

=== External policy ===
In 1808–1809, he led an expedition against the Chovdur tribe. In 1811, he finally subdued the Uzbek tribes of the Amu Darya delta who had broken away from Khiva. He also subdued the Kazakh tribes of the lower Syr Darya in 1812-1813 and in the 1820s, he conquered the city of Merv.

Mohammed Rahim strengthened diplomatic ties with the Russian Empire, the Ottoman Empire and the Afghan Empire. It was especially with the latter country that ties became very friendly, when Afghan Emir Mahmud Shah Durrani took refuge in Khiva between 1803 and 1809. When he regained his throne, he granted privileges to the merchants of the Khanate of Khiva so that they could trade without hindrance in his country.

The Russian envoy Nikolay Muravyov-Karsky was dispatched to his court in Khiva in 1819-1820 and in 1822 he published a book on his trip. According to him, the Khanate then had a population of 300,000 inhabitants, most of them Uzbeks or Turkmen.

A second Russian diplomatic mission was sent to Khiva in 1820. It was headed by Aleksandr Negri.

=== Cultural influence ===
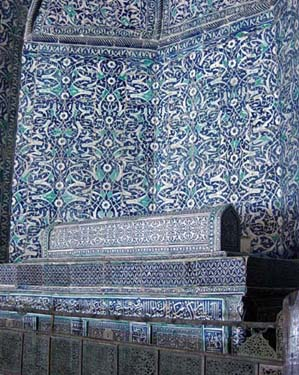
Tomb of Mohammed Rahim at the Pahlavan Mahmud mausoleum in Khiva.

In addition to his native Uzbek language, Mohammed Rahim also spoke Persian and Arabic. He strived during his reign to protect the sciences and the arts. He built the Kutlugmurad Inak Madrasah, the Bogʻbonli mosque, and other buildings. He ordered a new throne in 1815, covered with silver plates and decorated with arabesques. It is now in a museum in Moscow. The Khivaite historian Mounis Khorezmi was working on his History of Khorezm at this time.

=== Death and succession ===
Mohammed Rahim's son, Allah Kuli Khan (1794–1842), succeeded him to the throne of the Khanate of Khiva after his death in 1825.
Another son, Sayyid Muhammad (1823–1864), would succeed Kutlug Murad Khan, the last grandson of Allah Kuli Khan, who died aged 18 in 1856.

== Sources ==
- Gulomov Kh. G., Diplomatic relations of the states of Central Asia with Russia in the 18th - first half of the 19th century. Tashkent, 2005
- Gulyamov Ya. G., History of irrigation of Khorezm from ancient times to the present day. Tashkent. 1957
- History of Uzbekistan. T.3. T., 1993.
- History of Uzbekistan in sources. Compiled by B.V. Lunin. Tashkent, 1990
- History of Khorezm. Edited by I. M. Muminov. Tashkent, 1976

Preceded by Eltuzar Khan	Khan of Khiva; 1806–1825	Succeeded by Allah Kuli Khan
