= Khivan Revolution =

1917–1924 overthrow of the Khanate of Khiva

- Part of Russian Civil War
Date	1917–1924
Location	Khwarazm, Khanate of Khiva (now West-Uzbekistan and North-Turkmenistan)
Result	Red army victory
Territorial changes	Establishment of the Khorezm People's Soviet Republic.

Belligerents
Russian SFSR; Young Khivans; KPK	Khanate of Khiva; Basmachi movement

Commanders and leaders
(Russian Soviet Federative Socialist Republic) Mikhail Frunze	(Khanate of Khiva) Junaid Khan

The Khivan Revolution refers to the events of 1917–1924, which led to the elimination of the Khanate of Khiva in 1920, the formation of the Khorezm People's Soviet Republic, the intervention of the Red Army, the mass armed resistance of the population (see Basmachi) and its suppression, the inclusion of the republic into the Soviet Union on 27 October 1924, as a separate union republic, the elimination of the newly established republic as a result of national delimitation and the formation of the Uzbek SSR, the Turkmen SSR in 1924.

== Khiva Khanate in 1917–1920 ==
=== Khiva, the Provisional Government of Russia, and the October Revolution (1917) ===
From 1910 to 1918, the Khanate was ruled by Isfandiyar Khan. An attempt to hold liberal reforms after the February Revolution of 1917, the abdication of Nicholas II and the coming to power of the Russian Provisional Government failed, in particular, because of the conservative views of Isfandiyar Khan, who began to hinder these reforms. Discontent began to ripen in the Khanate, it got especially intensified after the October Revolution in Russia and the publication of progressive decrees (Land Decree) by the Bolsheviks, which was learned about in Khiva. The independence of the Khiva Khanate was recognized by the Provisional Government, and by the RSFSR after the October Revolution and the liquidation of the Provisional Government.

=== The coup in Khiva (1918) ===
Dissatisfaction with Isfandiyar-Khan’s policy greatly increased by 1918 and in the spring of 1918, the leader of Turkmen-Yomud, Junaid Khan, organized a military coup, overthrew Isfandiyar-Khan and seized power in Khiva almost without resistance. A relative of Isfandiyar Khan, Sayid Abdullah became a Khan (1918–1920).

=== Khiva Khanate in 1918–1920 ===
The actual dictatorship of Junaid Khan and his aggressive foreign policy led the country to terrible military defeats (Siege of Petro-Aleksandrovsk (1918)), which further intensified dissent in the Khanate and emigration from it. In 1918, the Khorezm Communist Party was established outside of Khiva. It was small (by November 1919 there were about 600 people), but it was the party that later (albeit with great help from the RSFSR) would become the force that overthrew the monarchy in Khiva. Bobookhun Salimov was one of the activists of the Young Khivans movement.

== Khiva state in 1920–1924 ==
=== The liquidation of the Khiva Khanate and the establishment of the Khorezm People's Soviet Republic (1920) ===
The internal contradictions in the Khiva Khanate intensified, and in November 1919 an uprising led by the Communists began in the Khiva Khanate. However, the forces of the rebels were not enough to defeat government forces. Red Army troops from Russia were sent to help the rebels. By early February 1920, the army of Junaid Khan was completely defeated. On February 2, Said Abdullah Khan abdicated the throne, and on April 26, 1920, the Khorezm People's Soviet Republic was proclaimed as part of the RSFSR.

=== Siege of Khiva (1922) ===
In April 1922, Junaid Khan captured the Boldumsaz District. On April 12, he attacked the Chovdur tribes, who were allied with Soviets, inflicting heavy casualties.

In later days of 1922, Basmachi uprisings broke out against the Soviet government in Khiva, where the Soviets suffered a heavy defeat against Junaid Khan and Molla Abdulkahhar in Khiva. Abdulkahhar later participated in the siege of Khiva alongside Junaid Khan during the uprisings. This led to Junaid Khan and Molla Abdulkahhar to seize control of Khorezm.

=== Background ===
After deciding to begin a new campaign against the Bolsheviks, the Basmachis came out of the desert, captured several kishlaks and, under the leadership of the former Khanate minister Sadiq Bakalov and Turkmen leader Agadzhi Ishan, organized uprisings in Sadivar, Pitnak and Hazorasp and took Xonqa and began advancing on Khiva.

=== The siege ===
In early January 1924, Junaid Khan managed to capture several villages and on January 19 supported by Khivan merchants and clerics, he took control of the city of Khiva and held it for a month. Basmachis launched an offensive against the city of Khazarasp and managed to capture it as well. Reports from the Central Asian Bureau described the Khivan government as ineffective and unsupported. The Turkmen population, seeing it as a foreign authority unable to protect their interests, ignored it entirely and instead took their grievances directly to Moscow's local officials. Junaid Khan's attack in Khiva caused uprisings throughout the country.

=== Soviet response and counteroffensive ===
The Soviet regime quickly increased its military presence in the area. For the defense of the city, companies of workers and Komsomol detachments were formed, which numbered around 500 people. The despatch of a Red Army cavalry column from Chardzhou towards the end of January. Covering 90 versts a day, the column had its first encounter with Junaid's forces near Sadyvar. But the decisive engagement took place near Pitnyak on 29 January where, after 14 hours of bitter fighting, the Basmachis retreated under cover of darkness, leaving about 300 dead and many weapons on the field of battle. During the fighting, the commander of the garrison, a Hungarian called Angello, was seriously wounded and captured by the Basmachis. Having tortured him, the Basmachis then cut off his head, which they impaled on a stake and put on display for those who defended the fortress. During the defense of Khiva, around 200 Red Armymen were killed or seriously wounded. To assist Khiva, several reinforcements arrived: the Turtkul Company of 218 volunteers from the Amu Darya region, the Shurakhan Volunteer Platoon, and a combined detachment from Novo-Urgench consisting of 130 cavalrymen and 45 infantrymen. Serious battles broke out with the Basmachis of Turkmen leader Agadzhi Ishan, which lasted about two days. Ishan's forces lost and were forced to retreat.

After learning that his forces had been defeated at Pitnak, Khazarasp, and Turtkul, Junaid Khan abandoned the siege of Khiva with 1,500-2,000 horsemen to the well of Balykly. but was driven from this position after a fierce engagement at the end of February. Pursued by cavalry and planes and losing men in battle and through desertion, Junaid retreated further and further into the desert. The Soviet 4th Aktobe Cavalry Regiment was ordered to chase down his retreating troops to the west of Kunya-Urgench. On February 26, 1924, the regiment rode deep into the Karakum Desert, following the enemy toward their bases at Charyshli and Orta-Kuyu.

=== Aftermath ===
Although the Soviet government regained Khiva, it took seven months for the Red Army to expel the rebel force. Further developing the offensive, the units of the Red Army were able to virtually destroy the Basmachi forces, and by the end of the year, the Soviet government had driven Junaid Khan and his supporters back into the desert. Junaid continued to launch attacks on Soviet troops and transport until he fled to Iran later to Afghanistan. By late spring 1924, all major Basmachi formations within the territory of the Khorezm Republic had been destroyed. Junaid Khan’s 1924 invasion of Khiva disrupted whatever progress Khorezm Soviet Socialist Republic’s new government had made. After the revolt was put down concessions were made to win back the support of the populace. These concessions included: resumption of socialist construction, with efforts focused on the rapid restoration of agriculture. In March 1924, the Central Executive Committee of the Khorezm Republic passed a law significantly reducing taxes on peasants and small artisans, which had a positive effect on economic development and on shaping the political consciousness of the working population.

== Results of the revolution in Khiva ==
As a result of the revolution, the monarchy was overthrown in Khiva (1920), a republic was proclaimed, and later it became part of the USSR.
