= Siege of Khiva (1924) =

Part of the Basmachi rebellion in the Russian Civil War

- Part of Basmachi rebellion Russian Civil War
Date	19 January–19 August 1924
Location	Khiva, Khorezm PSR
Result	Red Army victory

Belligerents
Khorezm PSR; Russian SFSR	Basmachi movement

Commanders and leaders
(Khorezm People's Soviet Republic) Vengy Angello † (Russian Soviet Federative Socialist Republic) Semyon Pugachov	Junaid Khan; Ahmed Bek; Agadzhi Ishan

Strength
Garrison : 800; Relief force : 393	1,500-15,000

Casualties and losses
Garrison : 200; Relief force : unknown	300 dead

The Siege of Khiva was a military operation from 19 January to 19 August 1924 by Basmachi insurgents to conquer the city of Khiva from the Red Army.

== Background ==
While the Russian Civil War had been decided in favor of the Red Army on all other fronts, the situation in Central Asia remained volatile because of the ongoing Basmachi rebellion.

By January 1924, the situation in the Khorezm People's Soviet Republic (former Khanate of Khiva) had become much more complicated. By that time, cavalry units of the Basmachis, numbering some 3,000 men under the command of Junaid Khan, had received British semi-automatic rifles and machine guns. Junaid Khan was also reinforced with some 6,000 local Basmachi horsemen. Other estimates include 700 for cavalry, 1,500 to 15,000 in total. According to Kozlovskiy, the attack on Khiva came at the end of January by a Basmachi force of 1,500. At that time there were only 785 regular troops of the Khorezm Government spread in various towns of the republic and only 200 Red Army men in Khiva itself.

After deciding to begin a new campaign against the Bolsheviks, the Basmachis came out of the Karakum desert, captured several kishlaks, and under the leadership of the former Khanate minister Sadiq Bakalov and Turkmen leader Agadzhi Ishan, organized uprisings in Sadivar, Pitnak, Hazorasp and took Xonqa; advancing further on Khiva itself.

== The siege ==
In early January 1924, Junaid Khan managed to capture several villages. And on January 19, supported by Khivan merchants and clerics, he took control of the city of Khiva and held it for a month. Basmachis launched an offensive against the city of Khazarasp and managed to capture it as well. Reports from the Central Asian Bureau described the Khivan government as ineffective and unsupported. The Turkmen population, seeing it as a foreign authority unable to protect their interests, ignored it entirely and instead took their grievances directly to Moscow's local officials. Junaid Khan's attack in Khiva caused uprisings throughout the country.

=== Soviet response and counteroffensive ===
The Soviet regime quickly increased its military presence in the area. For the defense of the city, companies of workers and Komsomol detachments were formed, which numbered around 500 people. The despatch of a Red Army cavalry column from Chardzhou towards the end of January. Covering 90 versts a day, the column had its first encounter with Junaid's forces near Sadyvar. But the decisive engagement took place near Pitnyak on 29 January where, after 14 hours of bitter fighting, the Basmachis retreated under cover of darkness, leaving about 300 dead and many weapons on the field of battle.

During the fighting, the commander of the garrison, a Hungarian called Angello, was seriously wounded and captured by the Basmachis. Having tortured him, the Basmachis then cut off his head, which they impaled on a stake and put on display for those who defended the fortress. During the defense of Khiva, around 200 Red Armymen were killed or seriously wounded. To assist Khiva, several reinforcements arrived: the Turtkul Company of 218 volunteers from the Amu Darya region, the Shurakhan Volunteer Platoon, and a combined detachment from Novo-Urgench consisting of 130 cavalrymen and 45 infantrymen. Serious battles broke out with the Basmachis of Turkmen leader Agadzhi Ishan, which lasted about two days. Ishan's forces lost and were forced to retreat.

After learning that his forces had been defeated at Pitnak, Khazarasp, and Turtkul, Junaid Khan abandoned the siege of Khiva with 1,500-2,000 horsemen to the well of Balykly. but was driven from this position after a fierce engagement at the end of February. Pursued by cavalry and planes and losing men in battle and through desertion, Junaid retreated further and further into the desert. The Soviet 4th Aktobe Cavalry Regiment was ordered to chase down his retreating troops to the west of Kunya-Urgench. On February 26, 1924, the regiment rode deep into the Karakum Desert, following the enemy toward their bases at Charyshli and Orta-Kuyu.

== Aftermath ==
Although the Soviet government regained Khiva, it took seven months for the Red Army to expel the rebel force. Further developing the offensive, the units of the Red Army were able to virtually destroy the Basmachi forces, and by the end of the year, the Soviet government had driven Junaid Khan and his supporters back into the desert. Junaid continued to launch attacks on Soviet troops and transport until he fled to Iran later to Afghanistan. By late spring 1924, all major Basmachi formations within the territory of the Khorezm Republic had been destroyed. Junaid Khan’s 1924 invasion of Khiva disrupted whatever progress Khorezm Soviet Socialist Republic’s new government had made. After the revolt was put down concessions were made to win back the support of the populace. These concessions included: resumption of socialist construction, with efforts focused on the rapid restoration of agriculture. In March 1924, the Central Executive Committee of the Khorezm Republic passed a law significantly reducing taxes on peasants and small artisans, which had a positive effect on economic development and on shaping the political consciousness of the working population.
