= Bekjon Rakhmonov =

Khivan-Soviet educator and revolutionary (1887–1929)

- Бекджан Рахманов

Minister of Education of the Khorezm People's Soviet Republic
- In office 1920–1921

Personal details
- Born: 1887 Khiva, Khanate of Khiva
- Died: 1929 (aged 41–42) Amu Darya river, Uzbek SSR, Soviet Union
- Education: Istanbul University
- Profession: Educator, linguist, journalist

Bekjon Rakhmonov (Uzbek: Bekjon Rahmonov; 1887–1929), also known as Mulla Bekjon, was a Khivan and Soviet educator and revolutionary. He was one of the most prominent figures of the Khwarezmian Jadid movement and the Young Khivans.

== Early life ==
Born in 1887 in Khiva, the capital of the Khanate of Khiva, Rakhmonov graduated from the Khiva madrasa, where he received a Sunni Islamic and partially secular education. In 1912, at the age of 26, he went to the Ottoman Empire through Iran, entering Istanbul University in 1913. During his time in Istanbul, he was acquainted with the idea of Jadid and made many friends and connections within the movement. He completed his studies in Istanbul in 1918 and returned to Khiva. In addition to his native Uzbek, Rakhmonov was fluent in Turkmen, Persian and Turkish. Later in his life, he learned Russian.

== Political career ==
After his return to Khiva, Rakhmonov met with Jadids from Khiva and its environs, joining their movement. Later, he joined the Young Khivans, who fought for the abolition of the monarchy in Khiva. After the Khivan Revolution and the expulsion of the monarchy, the Khorezm People's Soviet Republic was formed. Rakhmonov was present when the KPSR was created and participated in the drawing up of the new state. Immediately after the KPSR's formation on the territory of the former Khanate, Rakhmonov was appointed Minister of Education. In 1921, he became Chairmam of the Central Revolutionary Committee of the KPSR. In 1920–1921, he was also the editor of the Republican newspaper Inqilob Quyoshi (The Sun of Revolution). Thanks to his efforts, many schools teaching the Uzbek and Turkmen languages in the Arabic-Persian writing system were opened throughout the KPSR. In 1921, he opened Khiva National University (now Urgench State University), one of the first universities in Central Asia.

In 1925, after the national-territorial demarcation of Central Asia, Rakhmonov became head of the Education Department of the Khorezm Okrug of the Uzbek SSR, where he worked until 1926. He also held smaller posts. He advocated for the use of the Uzbek and Turkmen languages, defending the rights of the population to study in their native language. He wrote many works on Uzbek folk music and was able to play folk musical instruments. He was still in close contact with the Jadid movement, being an active supporter of it.

== Death ==
Because of his beliefs, Rakhmonov had many enemies. In 1929, he was killed by employees of the Joint State Political Directorate of the USSR in unclear circumstances inside a ship on the Amudarya River near Urgench. He was 42 years old. His murder is hypothesized to be political by historians because of his views and beliefs.
