= Siege of Petro-Aleksandrovsk (1918) =

Siege of Petro-Alexandrovsk
- Part of Russian Civil War
Date	24 November – 5 December 1918
Location	Petro-Alexandrovsk (present-day Toʻrtkoʻl in Uzbekistan)
Result	Bolshevik victory

Belligerents
Russian SFSR; Young Khivans	Khanate of Khiva

Commanders and leaders
(Russian Soviet Federative Socialist Republic) Nikolay Shaidakov (Russian Soviet Federative Socialist Republic) V. D. Voitintsev	(Khanate of Khiva) Junaid Khan

The siege of Petro-Alexandrovsk was an unsuccessful siege of Petro-Alexandrovsk (present-day Toʻrtkoʻl in Uzbekistan), which was under control of the Bolsheviks, by troops from the Khanate of Khiva under command of Junaid Khan, between 24 November and 5 December 1918.

== Siege ==
After the October Revolution of 1917, Russian Central Asia was in turmoil. Some cities, like Tashkent, Petro-Alexandrovsk and Charjou were controlled by Bolsheviks, while in other regions, all Russian troops had disappeared and the local rulers had taken back control. This was the case in the Khanate of Khiva, which had been very important before 1873, when it had been conquered by the Russian Empire. The Khan of Khiva in 1918 was Isfandiyar Khan, but he was completely overshadowed by his Turkmen General, Junaid Khan, who had crushed all demands for reforms by the Young Khivans in spring 1918.

In September 1918 Junaid Khan raided Urgench, which was still under Russian control and took some Russians prisoner.

In nearby Petro-Aleksandrovsk (Toʻrtkoʻl), the Russian garrison had been reinforced with Red Army troops under the command of Bolshevik military commissar Nikolay Shaidakov, who ordered Junaid Khan to release his Russian captives and return the stolen property. Junaid Khan released those arrested on 30 September, but did not return the seized property. He also warned Shaidakov not to interfere in Khivan affairs.

Junaid Khan realised that this nearby Bolshevik garrison posed a constant threat to his position. But he felt that it was too dangerous to attack the garrison at Petro-Aleksandrovsk in September, because Russian reinforcements could be quickly despatched by steamer from Charjou. As autumn turned to winter, navigation on the Amu Darya became almost impossible and Junaid Khan launched his attack.

On 24 November, Turkmen forces crossed the frozen Amu Darya and laid siege to Petro-Aleksandrovsk. But they were surprised when two steamships from Charjou managed to get through the frozen river with reinforcements, breaking the siege after only eleven days.

== Aftermath ==
The defeat of Junaid Khan near Petro-Alexandrovsk was of great political significance and strengthened the authority of Soviet power in the Amu Darya region. Petro-Alexandrovsk became the center of all progressive forces in the area, which were opposed to the conservative politics of Junaid Khan.

In the spring of 1919, Bolshevik troops from Charjou defeated Turkmen forces on the left-bank of the Amu Darya in the Pitnak area. Khiva itself was conquered by Red Army troops in first of February, 1920.

Junaid Khan then started a guerilla war against the Red Army, called the Basmachi movement, which would last until 1934.
