= Junaid Khan =

Junaid Khan may refer to:

- Junaid Khan (Basmachi leader), political leader in the Khanate of Khiva and the Basmachi movement
- Junaid Khan (cricketer) (born 1989), Pakistani cricketer
- Junaid Khan (Pakistani actor) (born 1981), Pakistani singer and actor
- Junaid Khan (Indian actor) (born 1993), Indian actor
- Junaid Jamshed Khan (1964–2016), Pakistani singer and preacher
