= Cholish =

- urban-type settlement
- Location in Uzbekistan
- Coordinates: 41°37′15″N 60°41′15″E
- Country: Uzbekistan
- Region: Xorazm Region
- District: Urganch District

Population (2016)
  - Total: 6,500
- Time zone: UTC+5 (UZT)

Cholish (Uzbek: Cholish, Чолиш, Russian: Чалыш, romanized: Chalysh) is an urban-type settlement in Xorazm Region, Uzbekistan. It is part of Urganch District. Its population is 6,500 (2016).
