= Gurlan =

- Town
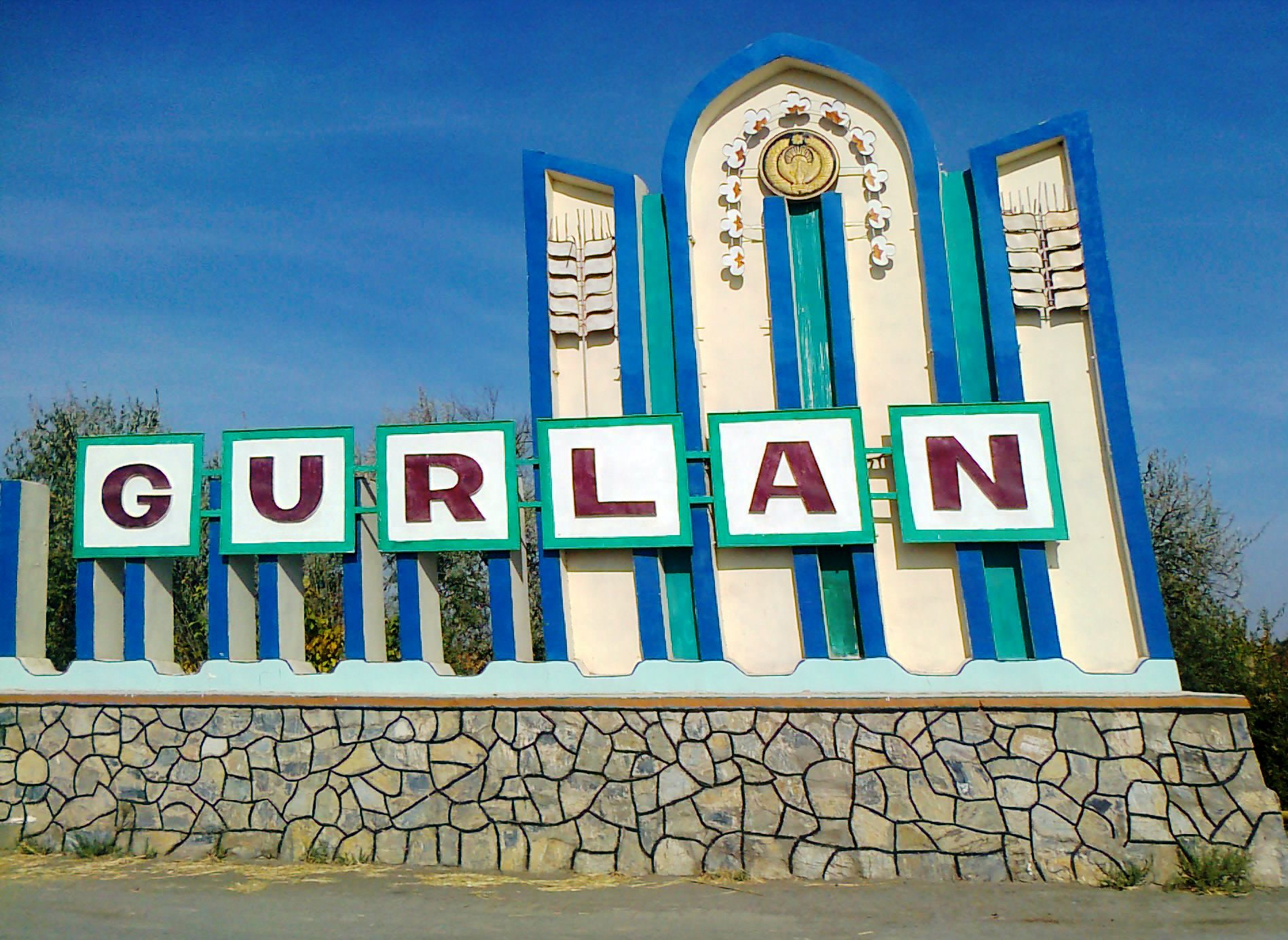
- Welcome to Gurlan sign

- Location in Uzbekistan
- Coordinates: 41°50′22″N 60°23′38″E
- Country: Uzbekistan
- Region: Khorazm Region
- District: Gurlan District
- Elevation: 92 m (303 ft)

Population (2016)
  - Total: 27,600
- Time zone: UTC+05:00 (UZT)

Gurlan (Uzbek: Gurlan, Гурлан, گورلن; Russian: Гурлен, romanized: Gurlen) is a town and seat of Gurlan District in Khorazm Region in Uzbekistan. It is located near the border with Turkmenistan in western Uzbekistan, 42 kilometres (26 mi) north-west of Urgench, north of Shovot, and south of the Amu Darya river. Gurlen is a major centre for cotton production, and rice and yams are also significant other crops.

== History ==
Gurlen was one of the medieval cities of Khorezm. A fortress was built about 7 kilometres (4.3 mi) north of Gurlen called Taza Vazir ("New Vazir"). The Hanafi jurist of Khwarezm, Jalal ad-Din Kurlani, is from Gurlen. In the early 19th century, it was a well-known merchant city of the Khanate of Khiva. Gurlen featured a New Method school from 1905 to 1911 which encountered extreme conservative opposition. In the 1820s, it was a well-known merchant city of Khiva Khanate. After the 1917 Russian Revolution the Khanate of Khiva was abolished, and Gurlen was eventually included into the Uzbek Soviet Socialist Republic. Bukhara, characterized as the nucleus of the Uzbek Soviet Socialist Republic, contained the part of Khorezm located within a triangle formed by Gurlen-Khiva-Pitniyak. Gurlen was a part of Khorezm Oblast, which was abolished on September 29, 1926, and the center of Gurlen District. After 1926, Gurlen and the district were directly subordinated to the Uzbek Soviet Socialist Republic. On October 1, 1938 Khorezm Oblast was re-established. It included Gurlen, which at the time had a status of rural locality, and Gurlen District. It was classified as a rural locality until October 1981, when under Soviet rule it was granted urban-type settlement status. In 1984, Gurlen was granted town status and became the town of oblast significance, meaning it was not a part of the district any more. A children's hospital was built here during the Soviet period. As Gurlen is located closer to Karakalpakistan, language there is a little bit different than in other towns in Khorezm.

== Geography and climate ==
Gurlen is located in southern Uzbekistan, near the border with Turkmenistan. It is 42 kilometres (26 mi) north-west of Urgench, north of Shavat, and south of the Amu Darya river. Nearby settlements include Ishandami to the southeast, Mangityap to the northwest, and Pakhtachi nearby to the west. The Yangiabadskoe deposit, noted for rock in native slate which is used for brick manufacture, is situated 15 kilometres (9.3 mi) to the west of Gurlen.

The climatic condition of the semi desertic region of Gurten is of extreme continental climate. As the annual incidence of rainfall is more than the rate of evaporation, irrigation is an essential requirement for cultivation in this part of Uzbekistan.

Climate data for Gurlen, Uzbekistan
Month	Jan	Feb	Mar	Apr	May	Jun	Jul	Aug	Sep	Oct	Nov	Dec	Year
Mean daily maximum °C (°F)	2 (36)	6 (43)	13 (55)	22 (72)	28 (82)	34 (93)	35 (95)	34 (93)	28 (82)	20 (68)	11 (52)	4 (39)	35 (95)
Mean daily minimum °C (°F)	−7 (19)	−4 (25)	2 (36)	9 (48)	14 (57)	19 (66)	21 (70)	18 (64)	12 (54)	5 (41)	0 (32)	−5 (23)	−7 (19)
Average precipitation mm (inches)	18.2 (0.72)	11.3 (0.44)	17.2 (0.68)	13.7 (0.54)	10.9 (0.43)	8 (0.3)	6.3 (0.25)	13.5 (0.53)	2 (0.1)	4 (0.2)	19.1 (0.75)	12.7 (0.50)	188.9 (7.44)
Source: Weatherbase

== Economy ==
Gurlen District is a major centre for cotton production (mainly for export) and the town is known for its cotton ginneries. Other crops include rice, yams and wheat (introduced in 1990 for self-sufficiency in food), and when wheat is not grown during winter, other crops are grown such as maize, sorghum, water melons, melons, and vegetables. The Uzbek government had stated that rice should not be grown in areas near the desert, but rice fields are apparent in the vicinity of Gurlen, and it forms the bulk of land use. Irrigation in the area from damming the Amu Darya (Oxus River) which flows nearby, as part of the Amu Darya Irrigation System, has much improved agricultural production, and a number of Koreans were sent to farms in Gurlen during the Soviet era to convert the border desert areas of Kara Kum into fertile lands.

Gurlen is a notable bread producer. Gurlen has a shoe factory which is a Joint-Stock Company called the “Khorasm Poiafzali”, or Garlen Shoe Factory. It was established in 1988. Shoes are manufactured from raw materials, particularly leather. Transactions are carried out in English. Several banks are located in the town centre including the Agro Bank, Xalq Bank and the Gurlen Milliy Bank.

There is a large-scale poultry farm in Gurlan.

== Demographics ==
As of the 1989 Census, Gurlan had a population of 19,807. Its population was 27,600 in 2016. Uzbek is the state language, although the regional Kipchak Khorezm language is also spoken by some in Gurlen. Residents are involved in professional trades of weaving, pottery, jewellery, baking, crafts and agricultural practices.). Khiva is the major city centre close to this town. The garment worn by the people is known as Khivan dona, which is an outer garment, and the other garment of general use is Urgen chapan. Musicians from the town are also well known in the country.
