= Toʻti Yusupova =

Uzbek longevity claimant

Tuti Yusupova Тўти Юсупова Toʻti Yusupova Тути Юсупова
- Тути Тожибоевна Юсупова
- Yusupova in 2009
- Born: Tuti Tojiboyevna Yusupova
- Died: March 28, 2015; Toʻrtkoʻl, Karakalpakstan, Republic of Uzbekistan
- Known for: Claiming to be the oldest person ever
- Spouse: Unnamed (fl. 1940)
- Children: Snezhana (fl. 2010)

Toʻti Tojiboyevna Yusupova (Uzbek: Тўти Тожибой қизи Юсупова, Toʻti Tojiboy qizi Yusupova; [toˈtɯ tɑd͡ʒɯˈbɑj qɯˈzɯ juˈsupəvɐ], Russian: Ту́ти Тожибоевна Юсу́пова; died 28 March 2015) was an Uzbekistani longevity claimant. At the alleged age of 134 years, 270 days, she was claimed to be the oldest living person in the world and oldest person ever, her claimed age exceeding that of the currently recognised claimant Jeanne Louise Calment by 12 years. She was born and died in the same village, but lived in four states: the Khanate of Khiva, the Khorezm People's Soviet Republic, the Soviet Union and independent Uzbekistan.

== Early years ==
She was the first of two children from Tojiboy and Uljon. Her father died when she was little. Yusupova worked at the family farm since she was 9 years old. Around 1897 or 1898, she married her husband, and with him, had four biological daughters. They also had an adopted daughter, born in 1941.

"During World War I, I had already had two children," she said. "I experienced the burden of those times. I remember it very well, and the period of collectivization. What can I say, our people suffered greatly ... But I have never been afraid of difficulties. I was busy plowing fields, paving ditches, picking cotton or selling fertilizer. I was always working and was always in motion. Perhaps that is why there was no need to see a doctor."

== Later years ==
She lived with her great-granddaughters and enjoyed watching television. She had claimed her secret to a long life is to be honest, hardworking, and helpful. In 2008, she was awarded the Shukhrat medal for being over 100 years of age in Uzbekistan.

Her age was uncovered in 2008 by Safar Hakimov, the ruling Uzbekistan Liberal Democratic Party's local chairman in Tortkol, Karakalpakstan when researching centenarians as part of the plans for the country's independence anniversary. If her age is correct, she would be more than a decade older than the oldest verified person, French woman Jeanne Calment, who died in 1997, aged 122 years, 164 days.

In 2010, a documentary was filmed about her called, Witness to Three Centuries.

Known as "Toʻti-Momo", she was deeply respected in her town of Toʻrtkoʻl. "In the run-up to visits, weddings and other events, we always come to her and ask for blessings", said village chairman Ikrom Bekniyozov. "It is a tradition that has developed over the years. You can't have something more unique in your village than having the oldest person in the world there." Another villager, Gulbahor Umarov, said "This house is full of guests. People just want to visit Momo, talk to her, to learn the secrets of longevity. Representatives of the World Health Organization came to visit." She had more than 100 descendants during her lifetime. "I lost count of grandchildren, great-grandchildren, great-great-grandchildren", she said before her death in March 2015. "I just say, 'May they be healthy!' Sometimes I confuse their names, but that's okay, as long as they are healthy."

== Death ==
Yusupova died on 28 March 2015, four days before Misao Okawa, the oldest verified living person at the time.

After her funeral, her late-issued birth certificate and passport were declared conclusive evidence by Baxadir Yangibayev, Chairman of the Council of Ministers in the Republic of Karakalpakstan, where she lived and died. and that he would pass this information on to Guinness World Records. However, she and her family refused this offer.

== See also ==
- Longevity myths
