= Nurzamin =

Nurzamin Uzbek: Нурзамин
- Town
- Interactive map of Nurzamin

Nurzamin (/nurzɘmɪn/) is a town belonging to Gurlan District, Khorezm Region, Republic of Uzbekistan. In 2009, it was given the status of a town.
