= Sheikh Mukhtar-Vali Complex =

Mausoleum in Uzbekistan

Coordinates: 41°20′21.2″N 60°33′23.4″E

The Sheikh Mukhtar-Vali Complex (Uzbek: Shayx Muxtor Vali maqbarasi) is a mausoleum located 5 km southwest of the town of Yangiariq, Xorazm Region, Uzbekistan. It was erected in the 16th century, above the grave of Sheikh Mukhtar-Vali.

This site was added to the UNESCO World Heritage Tentative List on 1 June 1996.
