= Yangibozor District =

Coordinates: 41.745°N 60.571°E

Yangibozor District Yangibozor tumani Янгибозор тумани
- District
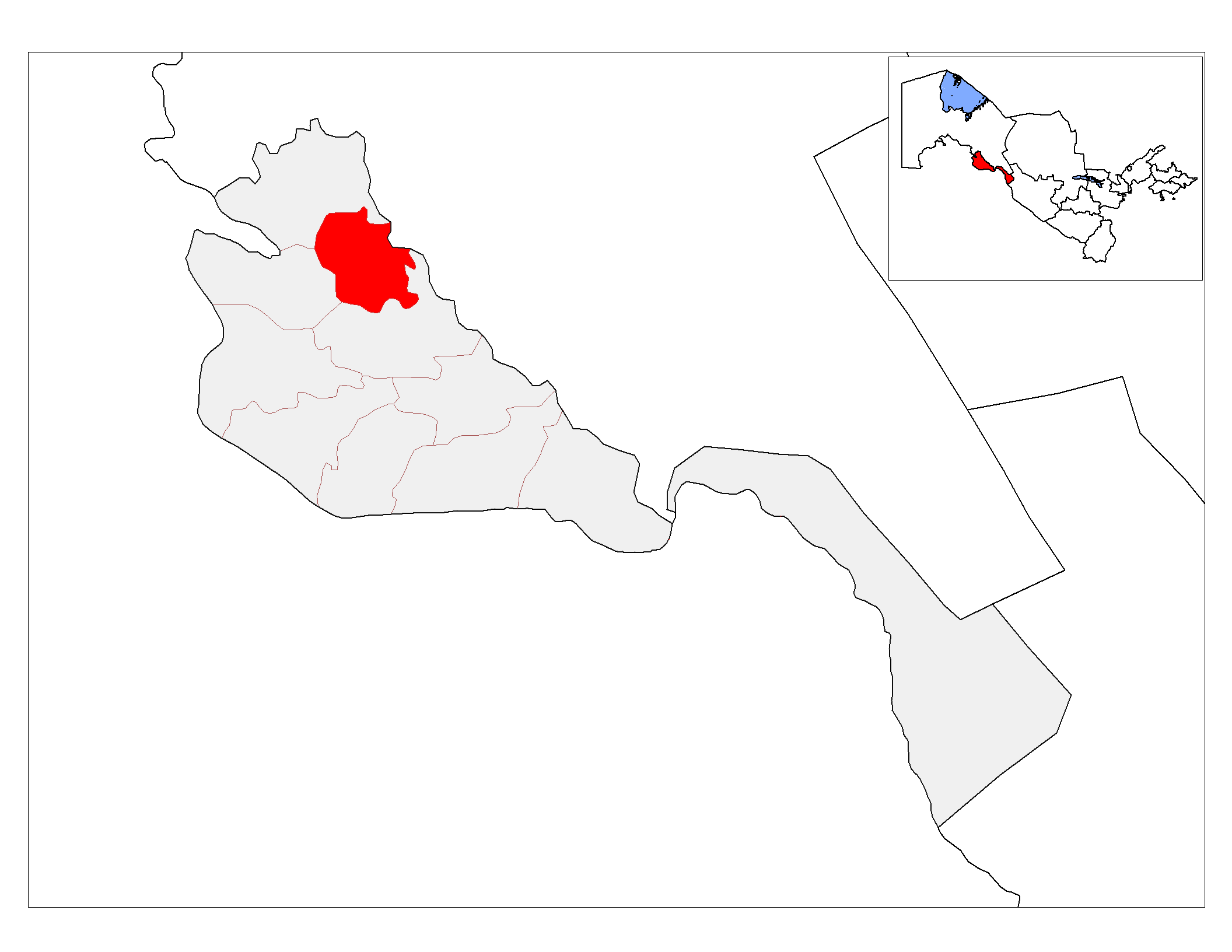
- Country: Uzbekistan
- Region: Xorazm Region
- Capital: Yangibozor

Area
  - Total: 340 km^{2} (130 sq mi)

Population (2021)
  - Total: 88,000
  - Density: 260/km^{2} (670/sq mi)
- Time zone: UTC+5 (UZT)

Yangibozor District (Uzbek: Yangibozor tumani, Янгибозор тумани) or Yangibazar is a district of Xorazm Region in Uzbekistan. The capital lies at the town Yangibozor. It has an area of 340 km^{2} (130 sq mi) and it had 88,000 inhabitants in 2021. The district consists of 3 urban-type settlements (Yangibozor, Yangi yop, Mangitlar) and 8 rural communities.
