= Yangiariq =

Urban-type settlement in Xorazm Region, Uzbekistan

- urban-type settlement
- Location in Uzbekistan
- Coordinates: 41°21′46″N 60°36′27″E
- Country: Uzbekistan
- Region: Xorazm Region
- District: Yangiariq District

Population (2016)
  - Total: 12,200
- Time zone: UTC+5 (UZT)

Yangiariq (Uzbek: Yangiariq, Янгиариқ, ینگی اریق; Russian: Янгиарык, Jangiaryk) is an urban-type settlement and seat of Yangiariq District in Xorazm Region in Uzbekistan. Its population was 8,824 people in 1989, and 12,200 in 2016.

Sheikh Mukhtar-Vali Complex, a mausoleum nominated for World Heritage status in 1996, is located 5 km southwest of the village.
