= Xonqa District =

Coordinates: 41°28′12″N 60°46′48″E

- District
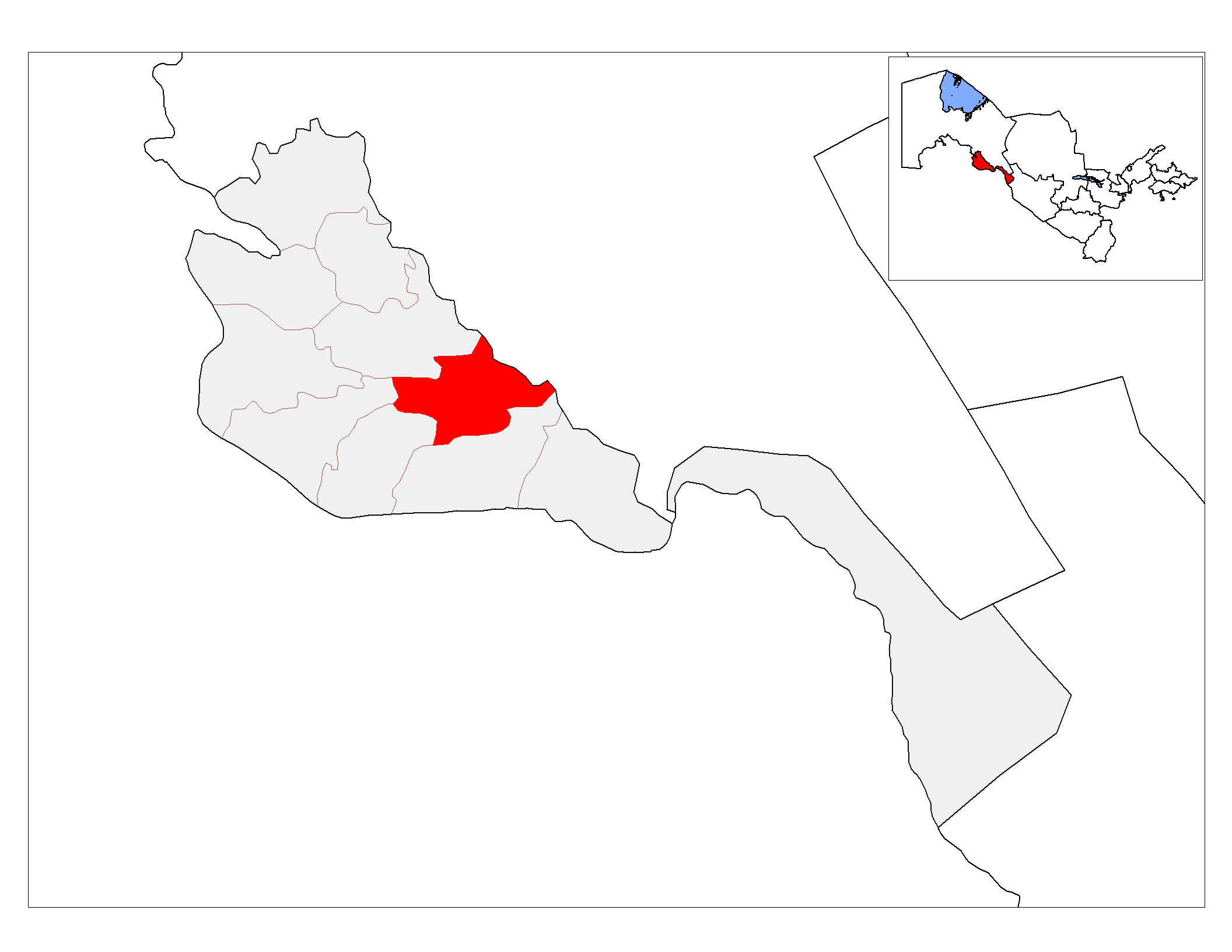
- Country: Uzbekistan
- Region: Xorazm Region
- Capital: Xonqa

Area
  - Total: 430 km^{2} (170 sq mi)

Population (2021)
  - Total: 188,300
  - Density: 440/km^{2} (1,100/sq mi)
- Time zone: UTC+5 (UZT)

Xonqa District (Uzbek: Xonqa tumani/Хонқа тумани, خانقە تومنى) is a district of Xorazm Region in Uzbekistan. The capital lies at the town Xonqa. It has an area of 430 km^{2} (170 sq mi) and it had 188,300 inhabitants in 2021. The district consists of 5 urban-type settlements (Xonqa, Istiqlol, Madaniy yer, Birlashgan, Yosh kuch) and 10 rural communities.
