= Qorovul =

Qorovul Qorovul
- Village
- Location in Uzbekistan
- Coordinates: 41°33′25″N 60°35′29″E
- Country: Uzbekistan
- Region: Xorazm Region
- District: Urganch District

Population (1989)
  - Total: 8,520
- Time zone: UTC+5 (UZT)

Qorovul (Uzbek: Qorovul, Қоровул, قراول‌، قاراول‌, also Qoroul) is a village and seat of Urganch District in Xorazm Region in Uzbekistan.
