= Tórtkúl District =

Coordinates: 41°33′N 61°00′E

Toʻrtkoʻl District
- District
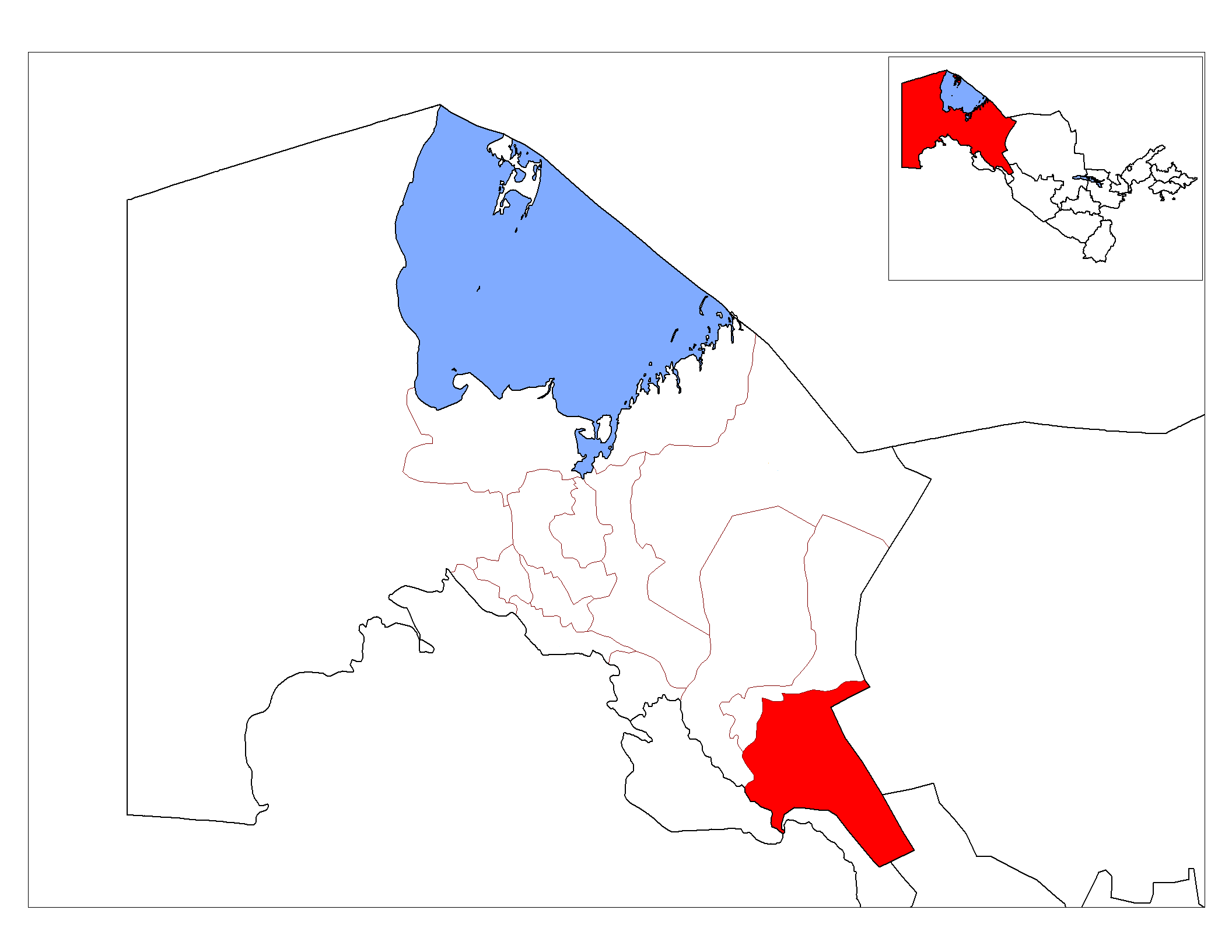
- Country: Uzbekistan
- Autonomous Republic: Karakalpakstan
- Capital: Toʻrtkoʻl

Area
  - Total: 7,480 km^{2} (2,890 sq mi)

Population (2022)
  - Total: 221,000
  - Density: 29.5/km^{2} (76.5/sq mi)
- Time zone: UTC+5 (UZT)

Toʻrtkoʻl District (Uzbek: Тўрткўл, тумани, Toʻrtkoʻl tumani, Karakalpak: Төрткүл райони, Tórtkúl rayonı) is a district of Karakalpakstan in Uzbekistan. The capital lies at the city Toʻrtkoʻl. Its area is 7,480 km^{2} (2,890 sq mi) and it had 221,000 inhabitants in 2022.

The district contains one city (Toʻrtkoʻl), five towns (Miskin, Turkmankuli, Tozabog, Nurli yoʻl and Amirobod) and 15 rural communities (A. Durdiyev, Jonboshqala, Kana Turtkul, Kaltaminor, Koʻkcha, Ata‘uba, Oʻzbekiston, Oqboshli, Oqqamish, Paxtaabad, Paxtachi, Tazabogʻyap, Ullubogʻ, Shoʻraxon, Qumboskan).
