= Gurlan District =

Coordinates: 41.841688°N 60.395966°E

- District
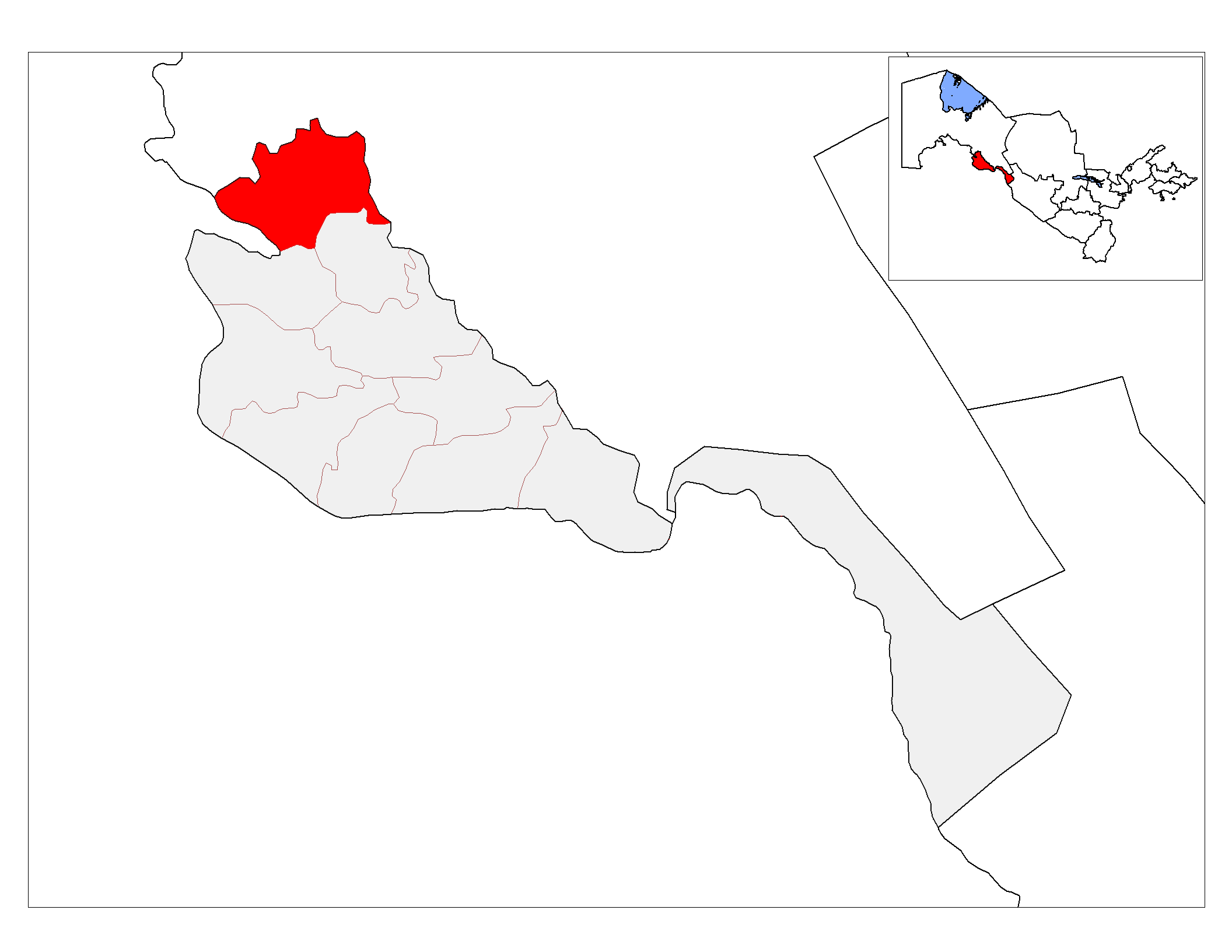
- Country: Uzbekistan
- Region: Xorazm Region
- Capital: Gurlan

Area
  - Total: 440 km^{2} (170 sq mi)

Population (2021)
  - Total: 149,500
  - Density: 340/km^{2} (880/sq mi)
- Time zone: UTC+5 (UZT)

Gurlan District (Uzbek: Gurlan tumani, Гурлан тумани, گورلن تومنى) is a district of Xorazm Region in Uzbekistan. The capital lies at the town Gurlan. It has an area of 440 km^{2} (170 sq mi) and it had 149,500 inhabitants in 2021. The district consists of 9 urban-type settlements (Gurlan, Chakkalar, Bozkala, Nurzamin, Nukus yop, Markaziy Guliston, Doʻsimbiy, Taxtakoʻpir, Yormish) and 9 rural communities.
