= Turkestan Military Organization =

Anti-Bolshevik organization in Russian Turkestan

- Founded: February 1918
- Dissolved: January 1919
- Active regions: Syrdarya, Fergana and Samarkand Oblasts of the Turkestan Territory of the Russian Empire
- Ideology: Anti–Bolshevism

The Turkestan Military Organization (Russian: Туркестанская военная организация, romanized: Turkestanskaya voyennaya organizatsiya) was an anti–Bolshevik military underground organization created in February 1918 in the Turkestan Territory of the Russian Empire, with its center in the city of Tashkent, a group of former officers of the Tsarist Army and a number of representatives of the Russian intelligentsia and officials of the former administration of the Territory with the aim of overthrowing Soviet Power in the province.

By the beginning of August 1918, the organization was renamed the Turkestan Union for the Struggle Against Bolshevism (Russian: Туркестанский союз борьбы с большевизмом, romanized: Turkestanskiy soyuz borby s bolshevizmom).

== Goals and objectives of the organization ==
The Turkestan Military Organization was preparing an uprising against Soviet power in the Turkestan Territory of the Russian Empire. The organization was actively assisted by agents of foreign special services, primarily British, from the border area, and agents operating under the cover of foreign diplomatic missions accredited in Tashkent under the government of the Turkestan Soviet Federal Republic. Initially, a revolt against Soviet power in the region was planned for August 1918, but for a number of reasons the date of this protest later had to be postponed to the spring of 1919.

The Turkestan Military Organization consisted of many officers, led by Colonel Pyotr Kornilov (brother of the famous leader of the White Movement Lavr Kornilov), Colonel Ivan Zaitsev, Lieutenant General Luka Kondratovich, former assistant to the Governor–General of Turkestan, General Yevgeny Dzhunkovsky, as well as Lastochkin, Gordeev, Pavlovsky, colonels – Rudnev, Tsvetkov, Butenin, Savitsky, Oraz–Khan–Serdar, Krylov, Lebedev, Aleksandrov, lieutenant colonels – Blavatsky, Kornilov, Ivanov, officers – Gaginsky, Stremkovsky, Feldberg and others. Later, the Commissioner for Military Affairs of the Turkestan Republic Konstantin Osipov joined the ranks of the Turkestan Military Organization, surrounded by such officers as Colonel Rudnev, Osipov's orderly Bott, Gaginsky, Savin, Butenin, Stremkovsky and others.

Ultimately, all the anti–Bolshevik forces of the region rallied around the Turkestan Military Organization – Constitutional Democrats, Mensheviks, right–wing Socialist Revolutionaries and bourgeois nationalists, Basmachi, and Muslim clergy, former officials of the tsarist administration, Dashnaks, Bundists.

In August 1918, in Tashkent, on the basis of the Turkestan Military Organization, the Turkestan Union for the Fight Against Bolshevism was created, which, in addition to officers, included, according to Soviet historians, such civilians as Count Georgy Dorrer, mining industrialist Pavel Nazarov, officials Alexander Tishkovsky, Shkapsky, Ivanov, technician Popov, engineer Agapov, constitutional democrats Shendrikov, Shchepkin, Mensheviks Zakhvataev, Levin, Mauer, Pogrebov, Skvortsov, Khvostovsky, socialist revolutionaries Funtikov, Domogatsky, Koluzaev, Khodzhaev, Belkov, Chaikin and others. Members of this underground organization established contact with Ataman Dutov, General Denikin, Kazakh Alash Orda nationalists, Emir of Bukhara, leaders of the Ferghana and Turkmen Basmachi, Trans–Caspian White Guards, British consuls in Kashgar, Kuldzha, Mashhad. The leaders of the organization signed an agreement under which they pledged to transfer Turkestan to an English protectorate for a period of 55 years. In turn, the representative of the British special services in Central Asia, Wilfrid Malleson, promised the representatives of the Turkestan Military Organization assistance in the amount of 100 million rubles, 16 mountain guns, 40 machine guns, 25 thousand rifles and the corresponding amount of ammunition. Thus, according to the staff of the Turkestan Extraordinary Commission, shared by Soviet researchers of this historical period, representatives of the British special services not only helped the conspirators, they determined the goals and objectives of the organization and controlled its actions, which, however, is not confirmed by the known documents of foreign sources.

In October 1918, the special services of the Turkestan Republic – together with the Criminal Investigation Department of Tashkent – went on the trail of an underground anti–Bolshevik organization, after which a number of arrests were made among its leaders. The leaders of the underground who remained at large left the city, but some branches of the organization survived and continued to operate. An English officer on a diplomatic mission in Tashkent – Frederick Bailey – went into an illegal position. According to Soviet historians, it was the Turkestan Military Organization that played an important role in initiating the uprising under the leadership of Konstantin Osipov in January 1919.

At the last stage of its existence, representatives of the new Soviet nomenklatura – the Bolshevik–Leninist Agapov and the technician Popov – actually entered the ranks of the Turkestan Military Organization.

After the defeat of the uprising, the officers who left Tashkent formed the Tashkent Officer Partisan Detachment (101 people), which since March fought together with other anti–Bolshevik formations against the Red Units in the Fergana Valley, and then near Bukhara. Then the remnants of the Tashkent Officer Partisan Detachment united with the units of the Turkestan Army.

== See also ==
- Turkestan Army (Armed Forces of the South of Russia)

== Sources ==
- David Golinkov. The Collapse of the Anti–Soviet Underground, Book 1, pp. 253–254
- "Civil War and Military Intervention in the Soviet Union", Volume 1, "Soviet Encyclopedia", 1983
- Alexander Iskander, Prince. "Heavenly Campaign", "Military–Historical Bulletin", No. 9, Page 8
- Andrey Ganin. "The Big Game of Major General Ivan Zaitsev". Almanac "White Guard". 2005, No. 8. pp. 193–207
- Sergey Volkov. "The Tragedy of the Russian Officers. Chapter 4. Officers in the White Movement". The Author's Site of Sergei Volkov "White Movement" on the Virtual Server of Dmitry Galkovsky
