= Tuproqqalʼa District =

Tuproqqalʼa District Tuproqqalʼa tumani
- District
- Location in Uzbekistan
- Coordinates: 41°11′N 62°00′E
- Country: Uzbekistan
- Region: Xorazm Region
- Capital: Pitnak
- Established: 2020

Area
  - Total: 1,920 km^{2} (740 sq mi)

Population (2021)
  - Total: 54,400
  - Density: 28.3/km^{2} (73.4/sq mi)
- Time zone: UTC+5 (UZT)

Tuproqqalʼa District (Uzbek: Tuproqqalʼa tumani) is a district of Xorazm Region in Uzbekistan. The seat lies at the city Pitnak. It was created in March 2020 out of the larger, eastern part of Hazorasp District. Its area is 1,920 km^{2} (740 sq mi), and it had 54,400 inhabitants in 2021.

== Origin ==
On March 23, 2020, at the next meeting of the Legislative Chamber of the Oliy Majlis of the Republic of Uzbekistan, a number of deputies raised the issue of changing the boundaries of Hazorasp district within the Khorezm region and establishing Tuproqkala district based on this. Based on this, they showed the orders of the President of the Republic of Uzbekistan Shavkat Mirziyoyev during his visit to the Khorezm region on March 13–14, 2020, and the orders of the Cabinet of Ministers of the Republic of Uzbekistan to create social and household amenities for the population 2. Some deputies emphasized that the creation of a new district will have a positive effect on the development of agriculture, especially livestock breeding, on the socio-economic development of the region, and on ensuring the employment of the population ( 2 ).
