= Hazorasp District =

Hazorasp District Hazorasp tumani
- District
- Location in Uzbekistan
- Coordinates: 41°19′N 61°04′E
- Country: Uzbekistan
- Region: Xorazm Region
- Capital: Hazorasp

Area
  - Total: 130 km^{2} (50 sq mi)

Population (2021)
  - Total: 196,900
  - Density: 1,500/km^{2} (3,900/sq mi)
- Time zone: UTC+5 (UZT)

Hazorasp District (Uzbek: Hazorasp tumani, Ҳазорасп тумани) is a district of Xorazm Region in Uzbekistan. The capital lies at the town Hazorasp. In 2020 it lost the larger eastern part of its territory to the new Tuproqqalʼa District. Its area is 130 km^{2} (50 sq mi), and it had 196,900 inhabitants in 2021. The district consists of 4 urban-type settlements (Hazorasp, Oq yop, Oyok ovvo, Nurxayot) and 11 rural communities.
