= Bogʻot District =

Coordinates: 41.351814°N 60.818253°E

- District
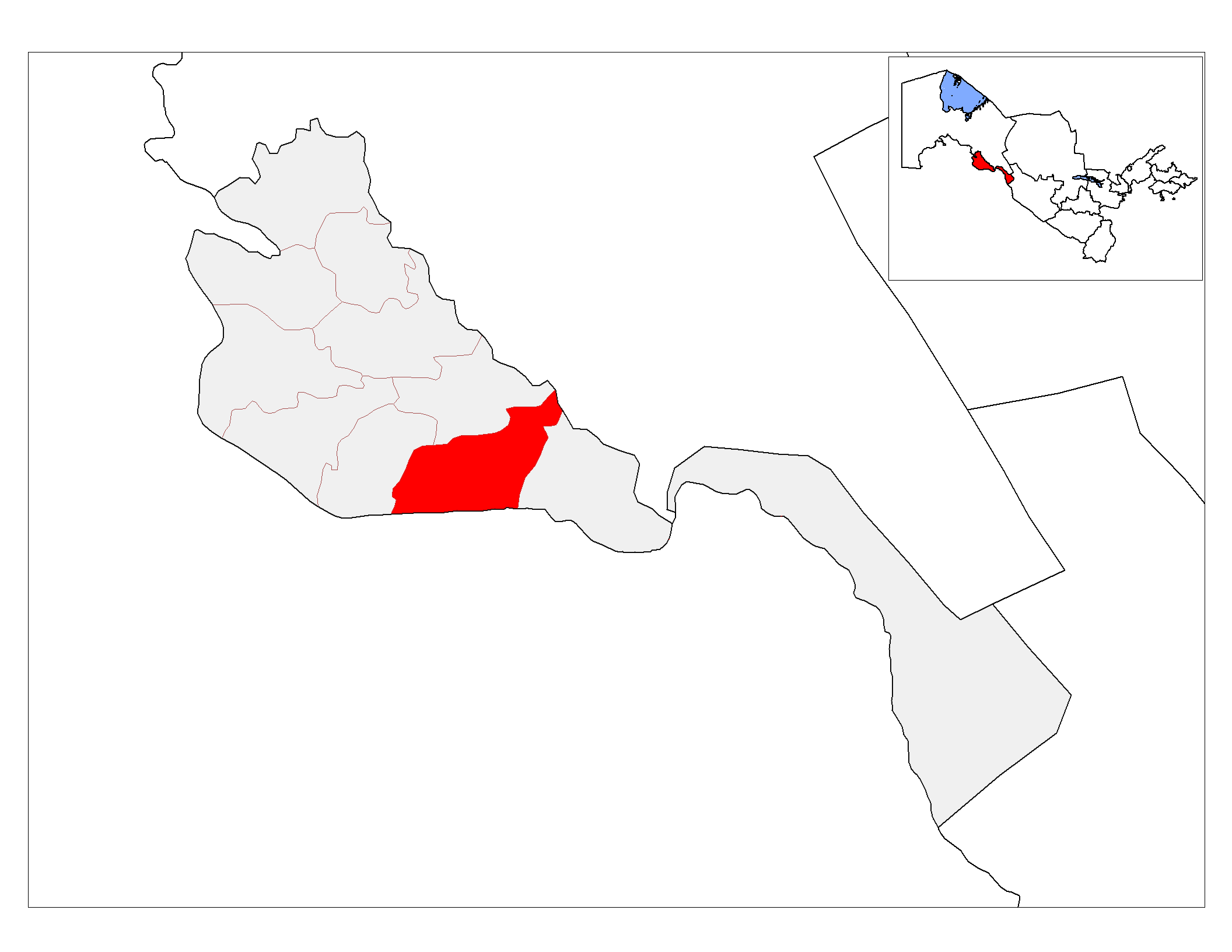
- Country: Uzbekistan
- Region: Xorazm Region
- Capital: Bogʻot

Area
  - Total: 440 km^{2} (170 sq mi)

Population (2024)
  - Total: 200,000
  - Density: 450/km^{2} (1,200/sq mi)
- Time zone: UTC+5 (UZT)

Bogʻot District (Uzbek: Bogʻot tumani, Боғот тумани, باغات تومنى) or Bagat District is a district of Xorazm Region in Uzbekistan. The capital lies at the town Bogʻot. It has an area of 440 km^{2} (170 sq mi) and it had about 200,000 inhabitants in 2024. The district consists of 5 urban-type settlements (Bogʻot, Madaniyat, Nurafshon, Oltinqum, Uzumzor, Yangiqadam) and 10 rural communities. The meaning of the word "Bog'ot" comes from two words: "Bog'", which means garden, and "at", which means "to do" in the local language. Which makes sense as create a garden.
