= Yangibozor, Xorazm Region =

Yangibozor
- urban-type settlement
- Location in Uzbekistan
- Coordinates: 41°42′39″N 60°32′21″E
- Country: Uzbekistan
- Region: Xorazm Region
- District: Yangibozor District

Population (2016)
  - Total: 6,800
- Time zone: UTC+5 (UZT)

Yangibozor (Uzbek: Yangibozor, Russian: Янгибазар) is an urban-type settlement and seat of Yangibozor District in Xorazm Region in Uzbekistan. Its population is 6,800 (2016).

The Amu Darya flows to the east of the town. Recently, there have been many development projects.
