= Qoʻshkoʻpir District =

Coordinates: 41.532226°N 60.35099°E

Qoʻshkoʻpir District Qoʻshkoʻpir tumani
- District
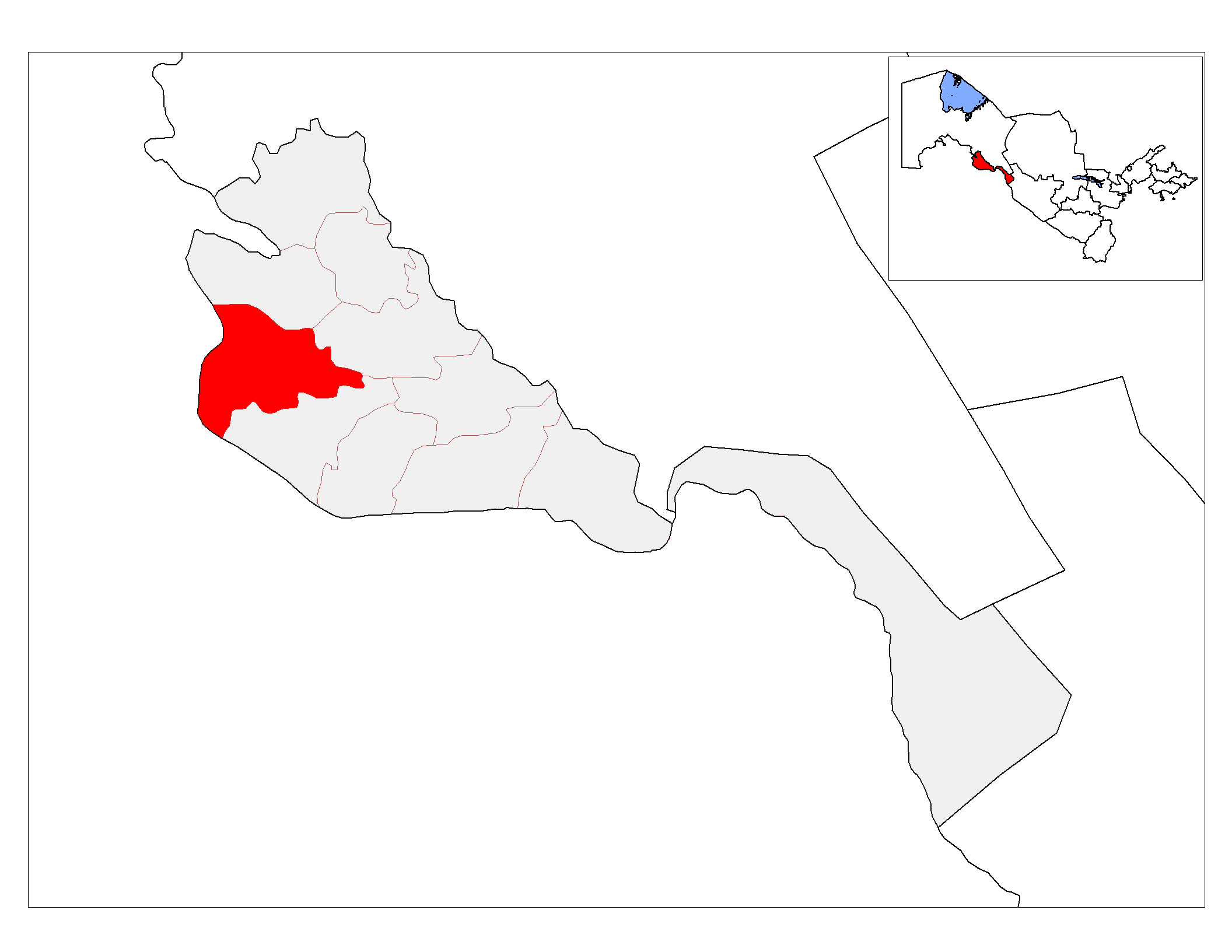
- Country: Uzbekistan
- Region: Xorazm Region
- Capital: Qoʻshkoʻpir

Area
  - Total: 540 km^{2} (210 sq mi)

Population (2021)
  - Total: 173,700
  - Density: 320/km^{2} (830/sq mi)
- Time zone: UTC+5 (UZT)

Qoʻshkoʻpir District (Uzbek: Qoʻshkoʻpir tumani, Қўшкўпир тумани, قۉش‌كۉپیر تومنى) is a district of Xorazm Region in Uzbekistan. The capital lies at the town Qoʻshkoʻpir. It has an area of 540 km^{2} (210 sq mi) and it had 173,700 inhabitants in 2021. The district consists of 6 urban-type settlements (Qoʻshkoʻpir, Qoromon, Oʻrta qishloq, Xonbod, Shixmashhad, Sherobod) and 12 rural communities.
