= Urganch District =

Coordinates: 41°33′00″N 60°38′24″E

Urganch District Urganch tumani
- District
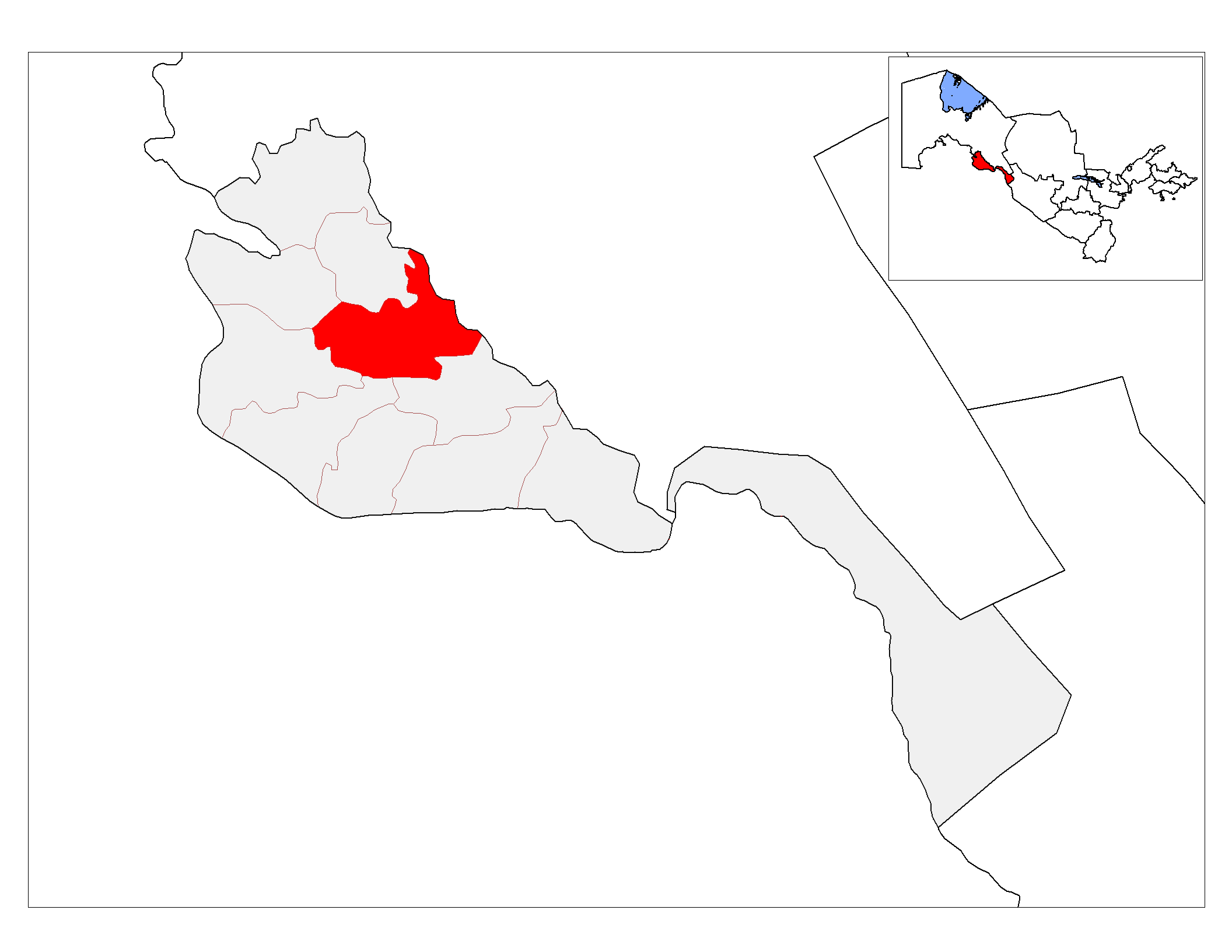
- Country: Uzbekistan
- Region: Xorazm Region
- Capital: Qorovul

Area
  - Total: 450 km^{2} (170 sq mi)

Population (2021)
  - Total: 201,200
  - Density: 450/km^{2} (1,200/sq mi)
- Time zone: UTC+5 (UZT)

Urganch District (Uzbek: Urganch tumani, Урганч тумани, اورگنچ تومنى) is a district of Xorazm Region in Uzbekistan. The capital lies at the village Qorovul. It has an area of 450 km^{2} (170 sq mi) and it had 201,200 inhabitants in 2021. The district consists of 5 urban-type settlements (Cholish, Oq oltin, Chandir, Koʻpalik, Gardonlar) and 10 rural communities (incl. Qorovul).
