= Shovot District =

Coordinates: 41°39′36″N 60°17′24″E

- District
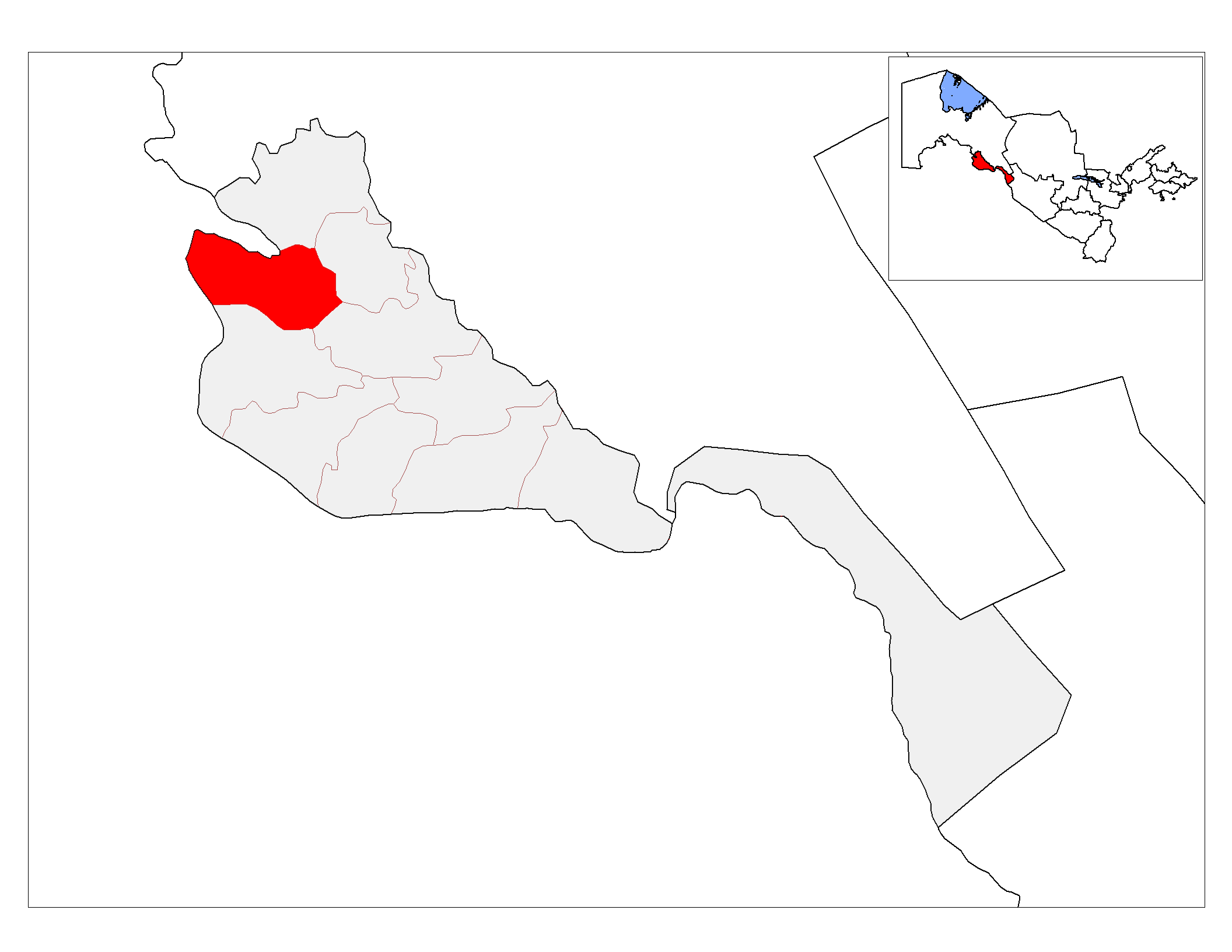
- Country: Uzbekistan
- Region: Xorazm Region
- Capital: Shovot

Area
  - Total: 460 km^{2} (180 sq mi)

Population (2021)
  - Total: 171,700
  - Density: 370/km^{2} (970/sq mi)
- Time zone: UTC+5 (UZT)
- Postal code: 211000

Shovot District (Uzbek: Shovot tumani/Шовот тумани, شاوات تومنى) is a district of Xorazm Region in Uzbekistan. The capital lies in the town Shovot. It has an area of 460 km^{2} (180 sq mi) and it had 171,700 inhabitants in 2021. The district consists of 5 urban-type settlements (Shovot, Boʻyrochi, Ipakchi, Kangli, Qat-qalʻa, Monoq, Chigʻatoy) and 11 rural communities.
