= Ivan Matveyevich Zaitsev =

Ivan Matveevich Zaitsev
- Иван Матвеевич Зайцев
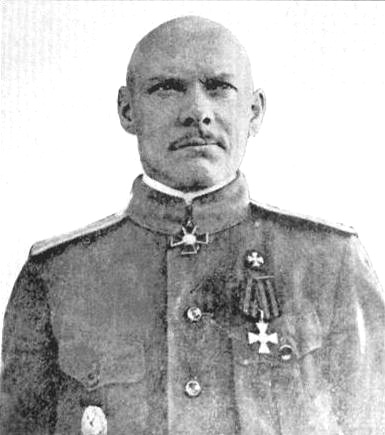
- Born: 1 September 1879; Karagaysky, Verkhneuralsky District, Chelyabinsk Oblast
- Died: 22 November 1934 (aged 55); Shanghai, Republic of China
- Military career
- Allegiance: Russian Empire; White movement
- Branch: Cossack Troops; Cavalry
- Service years: 1892–1918
- Rank: Colonel (1917); Major General (1919)
- Commands: 4th Isetsk–Stavropol Regiment of the Orenburg Cossack Army; Russian Troops in Khiva; Commissar of the Provisional Government in the Khiva Possessions; Civil War: Acting Chief of Staff of the Turkestan Military Organization
- Awards: Order of Saint George; Order of Saint Vladimir; Order of Saint Anna; Order of Saint Stanislaus; Golden Weapon "For Bravery"

Ivan Matveyevich Zaitsev (Russian: Иван Матвеевич Зайцев; 1 September 1879 – 22 November 1934) was an Orenburg Cossack, Major General (1919), a participant in the First World War, Commander of the 4th Isetsk–Stavropol Regiment of the Orenburg Cossack Army and Commander of Russian Troops in Khiva, Commissar of the Provisional Government in Khiva Possessions, Acting Chief of Staff of the Turkestan Military Organization, a participant in the Civil War on the side of the White movement.

== Biography ==
Ivan Matveyevich Zaitsev was born in September 1879 (according to other sources – 21 September 1877) in the village of Karagaysky of the 2nd (Verkhneuralsky) Military Department (Orenburg Cossack Army), in the family of a village teacher. In 1894, he graduated from a four–grade city school in Verkhneuralsk and became a teacher of the Fominsk United Cossack school.

In 1895, Zaitsev passed the exam for a second category volunteer and a year later, on 1 September 1896, he was enrolled as a cadet in the Orenburg Cossack Cadet School. In the school he was in charge of the armory. He graduated from college in 1898, the first in his graduation, for which he was awarded the prize of Prince Eugene Romanovsky, Duke of Leuchtenberg, in the amount of 100 rubles. Upon graduation, he was promoted to the rank of corpsman and was assigned to the 2nd Orenburg Cossack Voivode of the Nagoy Regiment, stationed in Warsaw. After serving in this regiment for more than a year and a half, in the rank of cornet he was assigned to Helsingfors and served in the Separate Orenburg Cossack Division.

In 1906, with the rank of sotnik, Zaitsev successfully passed the entrance exams and entered the Nikolaevsky Academy of the General Staff. Studying at the academy at the same time, but a course above him, were several of his future colleagues: the future Military Ataman of the Orenburg Cossack Army Alexander Dutov, the future Chief of Staff of the Southern Army Ivan Tonkikh and the future Chief of Supply of the Southern Army Sergei Schepikhin. Zaitsev graduated from the academy in the second category and was not assigned to the General Staff. He passed additional exams at the academy for the right to teach military administration and geodesy in military schools and, returning to his native land in the summer of 1909, entered the service as an officer–educator in the Orenburg Neplyuevsky Cadet Corps, by the beginning of the First World War – with the rank of lieutenant colonel.

=== Participation in the First World War ===
Lieutenant Colonel Ivan Zaitsev went to the front of the First World War voluntarily, having requested permission from Emperor Nicholas II and received the Highest Permission, although, being an officer–educator of the Orenburg Neplyuevsky Cadet Corps, he was not obliged to serve at the front. He was appointed to the staff of the 1st Orenburg Cossack His Imperial Highness the Heir to the Tsarevich Regiment. During the years of the Great War, he served as a senior staff officer of the regiment, assistant regiment commander in combat units, then temporarily Commander of the 7th Don Cossack Regiment, first assistant Commander of the 11th Orenburg Cossack Regiment, Chairman of the Regimental Court in the 12th Orenburg Cossack Regiment. Zaitsev suffered from shell shock during the war. During the war, he was awarded the Order of Saint George, 4th Degree, Saint George's Arms, the Order of Saint Stanislav, 2nd Degree With Swords, the Order of Saint Anna, 2nd Degree With Swords, the Order of Saint Vladimir, 4th Degree, with Swords and a Bow. The end of the First World War was met by the regiment commander with the rank of colonel.

=== Service in Turkestan and participation in the Turkestan Military Organization ===
Since July 1917 – the Commander of the 4th Isetsk–Stavropol Regiment of the Orenburg Cossack Army, as well as the Commander of the Russian Troops in Khiva and the Commissar of the Provisional Government in the Khiva Possessions.

With his regiment he participated in hostilities on the territory of Persia, in September 1917, he pacified the detachments of Dzhunaid Khan. Here Zaitsev had an opportunity to show his diplomatic abilities: Dzhunaid Khan became an ally from an enemy – and helped to bring the insurgent detachments of the Aral Turkmens into submission. Commissar Zaitsev was actively supported by the so–called "Aral Uralites" – exiled Old Believers Cossacks. Of these, equestrian teams of the Amu Darya Cossack Army were formed, which took part in the fight against banditry.

In October 1917, Ivan Zaitsev opposed the seizure of power by the Bolsheviks. In January 1918, at the head of his detachment, which consisted of seven hundred Cossacks (the six hundredth 4th Isetsk–Stavropol Cossack Regiment and a hundred of the Uralians), left Khiva for the city of Chardzhui. Zaitsev's detachment occupied the city, arrested members of the local Council of Workers' and Soldiers' Deputies and members of the Revolutionary Committee, and handed over the administration of the city to the body of the Provisional Government. In Chardzhui, Colonel Zaitsev met with the ministers of the Provisional Government of the Kokand Autonomy Mustafa Chokaev and Usman Khojaev to conclude an agreement on a joint fight against the Red detachments. The agreement provided for a joint action against the Bolsheviks. At the same time, another Cossack detachment (seven hundred Orenburg, Semirechye and Siberian Cossacks) arrived in the city by rail.

From Chardzhui, leaving a garrison in the city, Zaitsev with his detachment moved to Samarkand to go further to Tashkent. The second Cossack detachment moved separately. In Samarkand, Zaitsev hoped to use the Cossack units returning from Persia, where during the First World War they participated in hostilities under the command of General Nikolai Baratov, to fight the Soviet regime. In Turkestan, under the influence of officers' agitation, the Cossacks refused to surrender their weapons.

After receiving news of the offensive of Zaitsev's detachments on Tashkent, the revolutionary government in Tashkent and the Council of People's Commissars of the Turkestan Territory demanded that the loyal Red units stop Zaitsev's troops, and the demobilized Cossack units were asked to disarm. The Central Asian Railway was declared a state of siege. In total, up to 3,000 bayonets and sabers were thrown into the fight against Zaitsev. The Red Guards detachment, which left Tashkent, was headed by the Chairman of the Government of the Turkestan Republic Fedor Kolesov.

Zaitsev's detachment managed to occupy the city of Samarkand. The garrison of the Samarkand Fortress, in which the 7th Siberian Reserve Regiment was stationed, declared neutrality and at a garrison meeting decided to let the Cossacks go towards Tashkent. On 13 February, Kolesov's echelon arrived from Tashkent to Samarkand, thereby blocking the path of the Cossack units. By this time, at a new rally in the Samarkand Fortress, the garrison, under the influence of the Bolshevik agitation (Stepan Chechevichkin, Stefanyuk, Galimkhanov), decided to carry out all orders of the Turkestan Government. Patrols were sent to the city. At the same time, there was agitation among the rank–and–file Cossacks of the Zaitsev's detachment. After the news of the last meeting in the garrison, Kolesov decided to take active steps. The Rostovtsevo Station near Samarkand was occupied with a battle, the echelons of Zaitsev's detachments that were there withdrew to Samarkand. After the arrival of reinforcements from Tashkent, the Red Guards occupied Samarkand. There were no more clashes between the Cossacks of Zaitsev's detachments and the Red Guards. Under the influence of the first military clashes and agitation, the Cossacks agreed to disarm and hand over the organizers of the action, including Zaitsev. The Cossacks were left with personal horses and equipment. As trophies, the Red Guards captured several cannons, dozens of machine guns, rifles, ammunition, artillery and officer horses, and carts.

A significant role in these events was played by the commander of the Red Guard detachments, ensign Konstantin Osipov, who after that became the Minister of War of the Turkestan Republic.

Upon learning of this decision of the committee, Colonel Zaitsev was forced to flee, but five days later he was found in Askhabad and arrested. On 21 February 1918, a revolutionary court sentenced him to death, but the execution was replaced by ten years of solitary confinement in the Tashkent Fortress, where he was imprisoned on 26 February. Zaitsev fled from the fortress four and a half months later – on 1 July 1918. The escape was organized with the help of the Turkestan Military Organization, which, according to Zaitsev himself, "had connections and people everywhere". By the way, the Turkestan Military Organization also took care of Zaitsev's wife, sending her to Chimkent with a reliable guide on the day of her husband's escape. Once free, Zaitsev immediately became a member of this underground officers' organization as the acting chief of staff. After the defeat of the main structures of the Turkestan Military Organization by the bodies of the Turkestan Extraordinary Commission, Zaitsev, while trying to get to the ataman Dutov, was arrested, but not identified, and on 24 December 1918, was released under police supervision.

In April 1919, under the guise of a simple worker, he crossed the line of the Orenburg Front in the Bokhachevo Area and went to the location of the Separate Orenburg Army of Lieutenant General Alexander Dutov. Soon he became Chief of Staff of the Orenburg Military District, then – acting Chief of Staff of Ataman Dutov, from October 1919 – Chief of Staff of the Dutov's Orenburg Army. By order of the Supreme Ruler and Supreme Commander–in–Chief Admiral Alexander Kolchak of 20 September 1919, he was promoted to the rank of Major general.

On 6 January 1920, after being defeated in battles with the Red Army, Dutov's Orenburg Army was officially disbanded. In early February 1920, Ivan Zaitsev was sent to China as Dutov's plenipotentiary representative in Beijing and Shanghai.

=== Soviet period of life ===
At the end of 1923, Ivan Zaitsev received a personal amnesty from the Soviet government and at the beginning of 1924 returned to Russia, arrived in Moscow and was enrolled in the Reserve of the Top Commanding Staff of the Red Army. After a while he became chief of staff of a rifle division. At the end of September 1924, he was dismissed "on indefinite leave from the post of chief of staff" of a rifle division.

On 28 October 1924, Ivan Zaitsev was arrested by the Joint State Political Directorate and spent 7 months in Butyrskaya Prison. On 2 January 1925, by the decision of a Special Meeting at the Collegium of the Joint State Political Directorate, he was sentenced to three years in camps. In June 1925, he was sent in a convoy to Solovetsky Camp and on 16 June he arrived at the Kemsky Transit Point, and then on 18 June with a group of prisoners he was sent to Bolshoy Solovetsky Island. Here he began working as a forestry overseer during cleaning operations, later worked on unloading icebreakers in the White Sea, on watch at the Solovetsky Mayak, and also got on "general work" for refusing the offer of the camp leadership to write a note about the civil war for the magazine "Solovetsky Islands". In September 1926, he first ended up in a punishment cell, and then for three months in an isolation cell. He is one of the few surviving eyewitnesses who visited the "Sekirka" – in the punishment cell in the temple on Sekirnaya Gora.

In April 1926, excerpts from Zaitsev's memoirs "From the Recently Experienced" were published in No. 4 and No. 5 of the journal "Solovetsky Islands" (the monthly journal of the Joint State Political Directorate).

On 3 February 1928, after serving his main sentence, Ivan Zaitsev was sent into exile in the Komi ASSR for three years.

On 3 August 1928, he fled from under the supervision of the State Political Administration from the transfer point in the city of Ust–Sysolsk and wandered around the country for more than seven months.

On 17 September 1928, Ivan Zaitsev, using forged documents of land surveyor Pavel Golubev, got a job in the district land administration of the Amur District. On 26 February 1929, he crossed the Soviet–Chinese border near the Poyarkovo Railway Station and came to live in Shanghai.

==== Alternative version ====
In 2017, Vladimir Markovchin, a Senior Researcher at the Research Institute of the Military Academy of the General Staff of the Armed Forces of the Russian Federation, said that, according to declassified documents, after arriving in the Soviet Union, Zaitsev began to cooperate with the Joint State Political Directorate in carrying out an operation to withdraw from Shanghai to Soviet Union of ships of the Kolchak Military Squadron. This operation was successfully carried out.

According to Markovchin, Zaitsev's arrest was a cover story, as was his escape from exile to China. In reality Zaitsev was sent to China as an agent of Soviet intelligence.

This version was refuted the same year by Zaitsev's biographer, Doctor of Historical Sciences, Andrei Ganin, in a special article as inconsistent with the cited documents. According to Ganin, General Zaitsev made the decision to fight Bolshevism "from within", infiltrating the leadership of the Red Army.

=== Chinese period of life ===
Ivan Zaitsev lived in Shanghai from 1929, and was actively involved in journalism and writing books. In May 1931 he wrote and published a book of memoirs entitled Solovki about the time spent in the camp on Solovki.

His life in Shanghai was complicated by the extremely hostile attitude of part of the Russian public living in Shanghai. On 15 June 1930, Ivan Zaitsev tried to contact the head of the department of the Russian All-Military Union in Shanghai, Lieutenant General Mikhail Diterikhs, and filed a report in his name about the true goals of his trip to the Soviet Union, but Diterikhs told him "about the loss of the report with documents". Thus, it became almost impossible for Zaitsev to secure his official rehabilitation.

By order of the leading center of the Russian All–People's Party of Nationalists, he was appointed head of its Far Eastern Department. On 22 November 1934, Ivan Zaitsev committed suicide.

On 8 October 1993, he was posthumously rehabilitated.

== Family ==
He married Alexandra Semyonovna Zaitseva (née Metneva). They did not have children.

== Awards ==
- Order of Saint Stanislaus, 3rd Class;
- Order of Saint Anna, 3rd Class;
- Order of Saint Stanislaus, 2nd Class With Swords;
- Order of Saint Anna, 2nd Class With Swords;
- Order of Saint Vladimir, 4th Class With Swords And Bow;
- Order of Saint George, 4th Class;
- Saint George Weapon.

== Works ==
- Ivan Zaitsev. Kerim–Ali. Holy War in Turkestan – Morning of Siberia (Chelyabinsk), No. 92, 1919;
- Ivan Zaitsev. From the Recent Past – Solovetsky Islands, No. 4, 1925;
- Ivan Zaitsev. Solovki. Communist Hard Labor or a Place of Torture and Death – Shanghai, Publishing House "Slovo", 1931 – 165 Pages;
- Ivan Zaitsev. Four Years in the Land of Death – Shanghai, 1936 – 144 Pages.

== Sources ==
- "Ivan Matveyevich Zaitsev" (in Russian). «Russian army in a Great war» project.
- Zaitsev Ivan Matveevich. Computer Database "Memories of the Main Administration of Camps and Their Authors", Compiled by the Museum and Public Center "Peace, Progress, Human Rights" Named After Andrei Sakharov
- Volkov Sergey – The Tragedy of the Russian Officers
- Andrey Ganin (2014). Solovki by Ivan Matveevich Zaitsev (PDF) (Collection). Vol. 2 (Memoirs of the Solovetsky Prisoners (1923–1939) ed.). Solovki: Edition of the Solovetsky Monastery. pp. 162–171. ISBN 978-5-91942-027-9.
- Andrey Ganin (2005). "Major General Ivan Zaitsev's Big Game" (PDF) (Almanac) (8) (White Guard ed.): 193–207.
- Ganin, Andrey (2017). ""I Gave an Oath Promise to Tirelessly, Vigilantly Fight the Executioners and Tyrants of the Russian People...". New Materials About General Ivan Zaitsev" (PDF). Izvestija Laboratorii Drevnich Technologij = Reports of the Laboratory of Ancient Technologies. 13 (3) (Bulletin of the Laboratory of Ancient Technologies ed.). Irkutsk: 109–121. ISSN 2500-1566.
