= Qoʻshkoʻpir =

- urban-type settlement
- Location in Uzbekistan
- Coordinates: 41°32′N 60°21′E
- Country: Uzbekistan
- Region: Xorazm Region
- District: Qoʻshkoʻpir District
- Urban-type settlement status: 1992

Population (2016)
  - Total: 18,700
- Time zone: UTC+5 (UZT)

Qoʻshkoʻpir (Uzbek: Qoʻshkoʻpir, Қўшкўпир, قۉش‌كۉپیر; Russian: Кошкупыр, romanized: Koshkupyr) is an urban-type settlement and seat of Qoʻshkoʻpir District in Xorazm Region in Uzbekistan. Its population is 18,700 (2016).
