= Bogʻot =

- Town
- Location in Uzbekistan
- Coordinates: 41°21′N 60°49′E
- Country: Uzbekistan
- Region: Xorazm Region
- District: Bogʻot District

Population (2016)
  - Total: 10,700
- Time zone: UTC+5 (UZT)

Bogʻot (Uzbek: Bogʻot, Боғот, باغات; Russian: Багат) is an urban-type settlement and seat of Bogʻot District in Xorazm Region in Uzbekistan. Its population was 4,524 people in 1989, and 10,700 in 2016.
