= Yangiariq District =

Coordinates: 41.327°N 60.552°E

- District
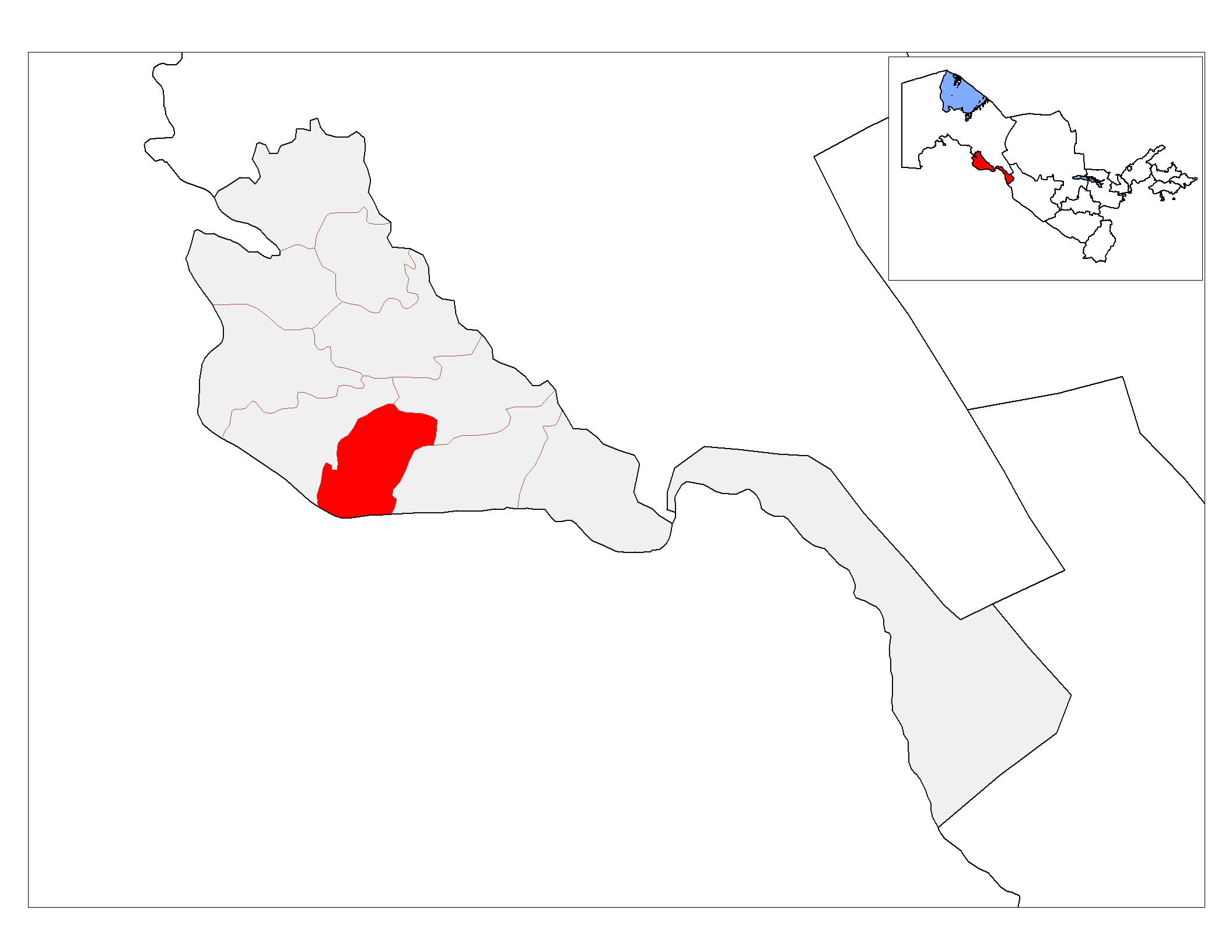
- Country: Uzbekistan
- Region: Xorazm Region
- Capital: Yangiariq

Area
  - Total: 400 km^{2} (150 sq mi)

Population (2021)
  - Total: 117,200
  - Density: 290/km^{2} (760/sq mi)
- Time zone: UTC+5 (UZT)

Yangiariq District (Uzbek: Yangiariq tumani, Янгиариқ тумани, ينگی اریق تومنى) is a district of Xorazm Region in Uzbekistan. The capital lies at the town Yangiariq. It has an area of 400 km^{2} (150 sq mi) and it had 117,200 inhabitants in 2021. The district consists of 6 urban-type settlements (Yangiariq, Gulbogʻ, Soburzon, Suvgan, Tagan, Qoʻshloq) and 8 rural communities.
