= Junaid Khan (Basmachi leader) =

Turkmen leader of Khiva from 1918 to 1920

De facto (last) ruler of the State of Khorezm
- In office March 1918 – February 1920
- Monarch: Sayid Abdullah

Personal details
- Born: 1857 or 1862 Badirkent, Dashoguz, Khanate of Khiva
- Died: 1938 (aged 76 or 81) near Herat, Afghanistan
- Parent: Khojibay (father)

Military service
- Years of service: 1912–1938
- Rank: General, Chief of the Armed forces
- Battles/wars: Basmachi Movement (surrendered); Siege of Khiva (1920); Siege of Khiva (1922)

Junaid Khan (Turkmen: Jüneýit han; full name: Muhammet Gurban); (b.1857/62–1938) was a Turkmen tribal leader who became the Chief of the Armed Forces and later the de facto and last ruler of the Khanate of Khiva.

Born into the Turkmen tribe of Yomut, Muhammet Gurban was the son of a tribal chieftain Khojibay, after whose death he assumed the leadership of the tribe. Gaining authority during the Turkmen uprisings of 1912-1916, Junaid was granted enormous power within the Khanate by the then Khan of Khiva Isfandiyar, who sought to lessen the growing Turkmen threat. However, after a short period of time Junaid arranged Isfandiyar's assassination and later enthroned the murdered Khan's uncle Sayid Abdullah as a puppet ruler, while himself becoming the real master of the Khanate.

Disillusioned with his ineffective policies that ultimately led to a new revolt, a number of influential leaders of other Turkmen tribes and Uzbek population appealed to the Bolsheviks, who were gaining a foothold in Russian Turkestan after the October Revolution. In 1919, under the pretext of assisting rebels, Bolsheviks invaded the Khanate and soon captured its capital Khiva. Junaid fled to the Karakum Desert with the remnants of his troops from where he organized active resistance to the emerging Soviet government.

== Biography before 1917 ==
Born in 1857 (according to other sources in 1862), Junaid Khan was the son of Khojibay, a powerful leader of the Yomut (Turkmen) tribe of Junaids and a wealthy man. Muhammet-Kurban himself, despite his illiteracy, also enjoyed relevant authority among his tribesmen, which allowed him to become first kazi (judge) in the village, and later a water distributor (mirab).

== Rise to power in Khiva ==
Flag used by the Khanate of Khiva during the civil war (1917–1922)

In September 1917, after the overthrow of the government of the Young (revolutionary) Khivans, who had advocated reform and wished to limit the power of the Khan of Khiva Asfandiyar Khan, Muhammet-Kurban Serdar arrived to the capital. By uniting previously warring Turkmen tribes and establishing close relations with Colonel Ivan Zaitsev, the head of the detachment sent to Khiva by the Provisional Government of Russia, he became one of the most influential people in the Khanate.

In January 1918, Asfandiyar Khan appointed Muhammet-Kurban as the commander of the armed forces of the Khanate, bestowing on him the title "Serdar-Karim" ("noble commander"). After Zaitsev's detachment from Khiva recaptured Tashkent from Bolsheviks and Left Social Revolutionaries, the Junaid Khan's detachment, numbering about 1,600 horsemen, became the main military force in the Khanate.

Dissatisfaction with Asfandiyar’s policy greatly increased in Khiva and in the spring of 1918, Junaid Khan organized a military coup, which overthrew and put to death Asfandiyar. Later he seized power for himself almost without resistance. An uncle of Asfandiyar Khan, Sayyid Abdullah became a new (puppet) Khan.

Having defeated and expelled by mid-September 1918 his main adversaries in the Khanate – the Turkmen leaders of Koshmammet Khan, Gulam-ali, Shamyrat-Bakhshi – Muhammed-Kurban actually became the ruler of Khiva.

== Clashes with the Red Army ==
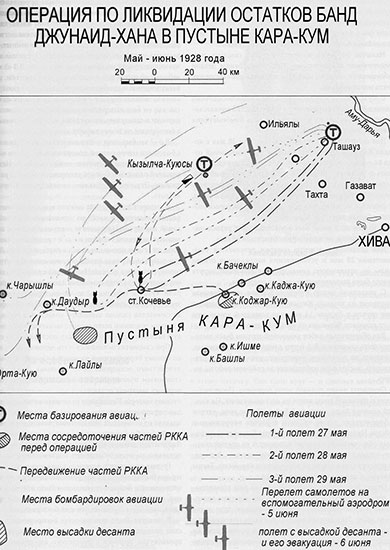
Operation to liquidate the remnants of Dzhunaid Khan's gangs in the Kara-Kum desert. May–June 1928

After the 1917 Bolshevik seizure of power in the October Revolution, and Junaid's failed attack against the Boshevik stronghold in Petro-Aleksandrovsk, anti-monarchists and Turkmen tribesmen joined forces with the Bolsheviks at the end of 1919 to depose the Khan.
By early February 1920, the Khivan army under Junaid Khan was completely defeated and Junaid Khan retreated to Karakum desert. On 2 February 1920, Khiva's last Khan, Sayyid Abdullah, abdicated and a short-lived Khorezm People's Soviet Republic (later the Khorezm SSR) was created out of the territory of the old Khanate of Khiva, before it was finally incorporated into the Soviet Union in 1924. The former Khanate was divided between the new Turkmen SSR and Uzbek SSR.

In early months of 1922 during the height of Basmachi movement, Enver Pasha sent convoys and letters to Junaid Khan who was offering strong resistance to the Bolsheviks in the Karakum desert. In addition, Turkmen tribes also joined Junaid khan, who had the title of "Commander of the Army of Islam" Thus the area under the control of the Khiva Basmachis was significantly expanded. In April 1922, Junaid Khan captured The Boldumsaz District. In April 12, Junaid Khan attacked the Turkmen tribes of Chavodurs who were close with Soviets and reflected heavy casualties.

There were Basmachi uprisings against the Soviet government in Khiva in 1922 and the Russians also suffered a heavy defeat against Junaid Khan in Khiva. Which led to Khiva and Khorezm being finally seized by Junaid Khan. However, even though Junaid Khan lost in May 1922, he did not lose any of his soldiers; in fact, new volunteers started joining his army. Although he did not lose any of his soldiers, some of his troops began to negotiate with the Red Army and eventually 150 basmachis surrendered.

Junaid Khan later waged numerous wars for several years with the emerging Soviet Turkestan and later with constituent republics of Soviet Central Asia for different reasons: to keep Khiva independent from Soviet rule, to recapture lost territories of the Khanate during the years as Russian protectorate, as well as to accumulate wealth. Though initially some of his battles were successful, he lost the most important ones and finally fled first to Persia and then to Afghanistan where he eventually died in 1938.

== See also ==
- Yomuds
- Turkmens
- Asfandiyar Khan
- Khanate of Khiva
- Russian conquest of Central Asia
- The Great Game
- Khorezm People's Soviet Republic
- Soviet Turkestan
- Khorezm
- Basmachi movement

== Literature ==
- D. M. Abdullahanov: Tarki Dunyo, Tashkent 2009.
