= Shovot =

- Town
- Location in Uzbekistan
- Coordinates: 41°39′21″N 60°18′9″E
- Country: Uzbekistan
- Region: Xorazm Region
- District: Shovot District

Population (2016)
  - Total: 19,000
- Time zone: UTC+5 (UZT)

Shovot, also Shavat, (Uzbek: Shovot/Шовот, شاوات; Russian: Шават, romanized: Shavat) is a town and seat of Shovot District in Xorazm Region in Uzbekistan. The town is located 37 km north-west of Urgench. It has a railway station on the line Turkmenabad - Beineu. The population was 20,600 in 1991, and 19,000 in 2016. It attained city status in 1981. It contains an Asphalt concrete plant.
