= Young Khivans =

The Young Khivans were a political movement that emerged in 1905-1907 among the Uzbeks of the Khiva Khanate within the framework of Jadidism, a cultural movement of Muslim modernist reformers.

== History ==
At first, the Young Khivans were engaged in cultural and educational activities only.

On 5 (18) April 1917, they persuaded Isfandiyar Khan of Khiva to issue a manifesto on the establishment of a constitutional monarchy in the territory of the Khanate. The post of chairman in the newly created Majlis (Assembly) was taken by Bobohun Salimov, one of the most prominent Young Khivans. However, in the summer of that year, the Khan of Khiva, with the participation of the Russian Provisional Government in Petrograd, regained absolute power, arresting and executing some of the Young Khivans. Other participants in the movement hid in Turkestan, where they received guarantees of support from the Bolsheviks.

After the conquest of Khiva by the Turkmen feudal lord Junaid Khan in January 1918, representatives of the Young Khivan movement led the fight against him and from December 1919, together with the Soviet troops, opposed his troops.

With the dissolution of the Khanate in February 1920, the Young Khivans became the leaders of the Communist Party of Khorezm (with Dzhumaniyaz Sultanmuradov as Chairman of the Central Committee) and the Khorezm People's Soviet Republic (with Palvanniyaz Khodja Yusupov as Chairman of the Council of Ministers).

In September 1920, they tried to achieve the disarmament of the Turkmen volunteer detachments, pushing the Turkmen tribes in the Republic to a general uprising.

In March 1921, with the assistance of the Political Directorate of the Khorezm Red Army, they were deprived of power; some of them were arrested, others joined the ranks of the Basmachi.

== See also ==
- Young Bukharans
- Young Kashgar Party
