= Xonqa =

- urban-type settlement
- Location in Uzbekistan
- Coordinates: 41°28′27″N 60°46′56″E
- Country: Uzbekistan
- Region: Xorazm Region
- District: Xonqa District

Population (2016)
  - Total: 39,400
- Time zone: UTC+5 (UZT)
- Postal code: 220800

Xonqa (Uzbek: Xonqa/Хонқа, خانقه; Russian: Ханка) is an urban-type settlement and seat of Xonqa District in Xorazm Region in Uzbekistan. Its population was 28,981 people in 1989, and 39,400 in 2016.
