= Hazorasp =

- Town
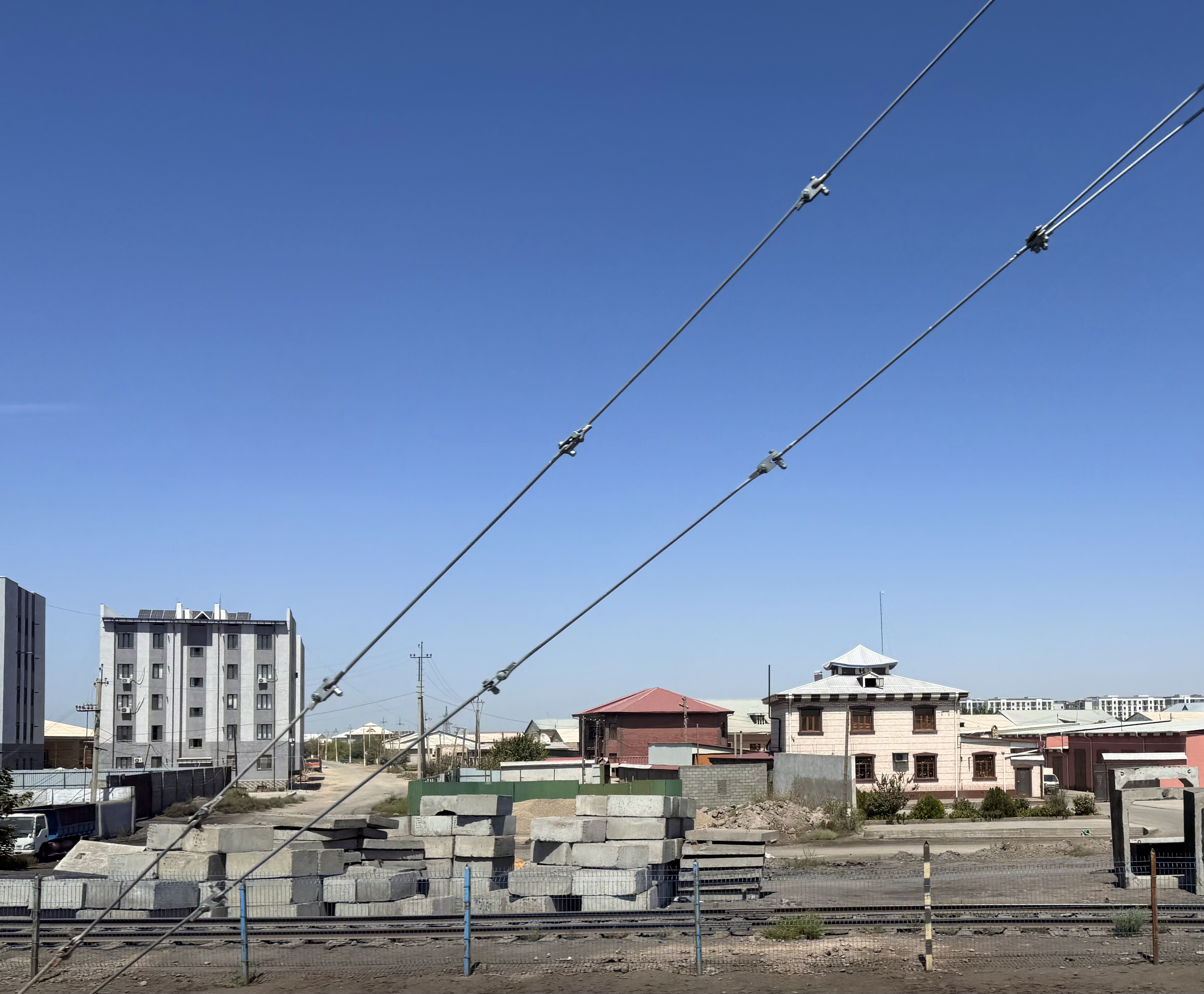

- Location in Uzbekistan
- Coordinates: 41°19′N 61°04′E
- Country: Uzbekistan
- Region: Xorazm Region
- District: Hazorasp District

Population (2016)
  - Total: 18,800
- Time zone: UTC+5 (UZT)

Hazorasp (Uzbek: Hazorasp, Ҳазорасп), also known as Khazarasp (Russian: Хазарасп), or by its more ancient name Hazarasp (Persian: هزار اسپ, meaning "thousand horses"), is an urban-type settlement in Uzbekistan, administrative centre of the Hazorasp District. Its population is 18,800 (2016). It lies at the head of the Amu Darya delta south of the Aral Sea.

== History ==
It was an important trading center during the medieval period. During its history, the town has been subject to various battles; between the Ghaznavid Sultan Mahmud of Ghazni and the Ma'munid ruler Abu'l-Harith Muhammad in 1017; between the Seljuq Sultan Ahmad Sanjar and the Khwarazmian ruler Atsiz in 1147; and between the Khwarazmian ruler Muhammad II and the Ghurid ruler Mu'izz al-Din Muhammad. The town was finally destroyed during the Mongol invasions.

The town was later rebuilt, and only retained some of its importance. It was later a stronghold under the Mongol Arabshahids, and was also used as a residence by the Arabshahid princes. It was captured by the Russians during the Khivan campaign of 1873. The city has survived to present day, and is today a part of Uzbekistan. It was added to the UNESCO World Heritage Tentative List in January 2008, in the Cultural category.

== Sources ==
- Luzac, & Co (1986). "The Encyclopedia of Islam". The Encyclopaedia of Islam, Vol. III. London: E.J. Brill. pp. 1–1304.
