= Communist Party of Khorezm =

Ruling political party of the Khorezm SSR (1920–24)

Communist Party of Khorezm حزب کمونیست خوارزم
- Founded: 4 April 1920
- Dissolved: 27 October 1924
- Preceded by: Young Khivan Party
- Ideology: Communism; Marxism–Leninism
- Political position: Far-left
- National affiliation: Russian Communist Party (Bolsheviks) (1922–1924)

Party flag

The Communist Party of Khorezm (Persian: حزب کمونیست خوارزم; Uzbek: Xorazm Kommunistik partiyasi) was a political party that existed in the final months of the Khanate of Khiva, and after 26 April 1920, in the Khorezm People's Soviet Republic.

In 1922, the party became affiliated to the Russian Communist Party (Bolsheviks). During the spring of 1924, when proposals for reorganization of Soviet Central Asia were discussed the leadership of the Communist Party of Khorezm declined to take any firm position on the issue. Only in July the same year did the party formally approve of the plans to form Soviet republics on nationality-based boundaries. The official Soviet histography at the time claimed that the Communist Party of Khorezm had been a nest of "bourgeois-and-nationalistic and Trotskyist elements, who hampered the forming of new Republics". Later, in 1924, the party was dissolved as the boundaries of Soviet Central Asia were redrawn, with the Khorezm SSR being split between the Uzbek and Turkmen SSRs and the Karakalpak Autonomous Oblast.

== Party leaders ==
There were nine leaders of the party during its four-year existence:

Denotes Acting leader

Name	Took office	Left office	Notes
Chairmen of the Communist Party of Khorezm
Alimdzhan Akchurin	4 April 1920	3 June 1920	
Mulla Dzhumaniyaz Sultanmuradov	4 June 1920	December 1920	
Makhmud Musayev	December 1920	29 May 1921	Head of Political Administration of Khorezmian Red Army
Executive Secretaries of the Communist Party of Khorezm
Mukhamedzhan Tazetdinov	29 May 1921	12 November 1921	
Berdi Gadzhiev	12 November 1921	17 December 1921	
Gaifi Sharafutdinov	17 December 1921	22 July 1923	
Mukhamed Sharipov	22 July 1923	22 September 1923	
Karimzhan Adinaev	22 September 1923	15 June 1924	
Iskhak Khansuvarov	15 June 1924	27 October 1924	
