= Pitnak =

- Location in Uzbekistan
- Coordinates: 41°13′20″N 61°18′24″E
- Country: Uzbekistan
- Region: Xorazm Region
- District: Tuproqqalʼa District

Population (2016)
  - Total: 16,800
- Time zone: UTC+5 (UZT)

Pitnak (Uzbek: Pitnak / Питнак) is a city in Xorazm Region, Uzbekistan. It is the seat of Tuproqqalʼa District. The town population was 12,411 people in 1989, and 16,800 in 2016.
