= Khorazm Region =

Region of Uzbekistan

Xorazm Viloyati Xorazm viloyati
- Region
- Khorezm Region
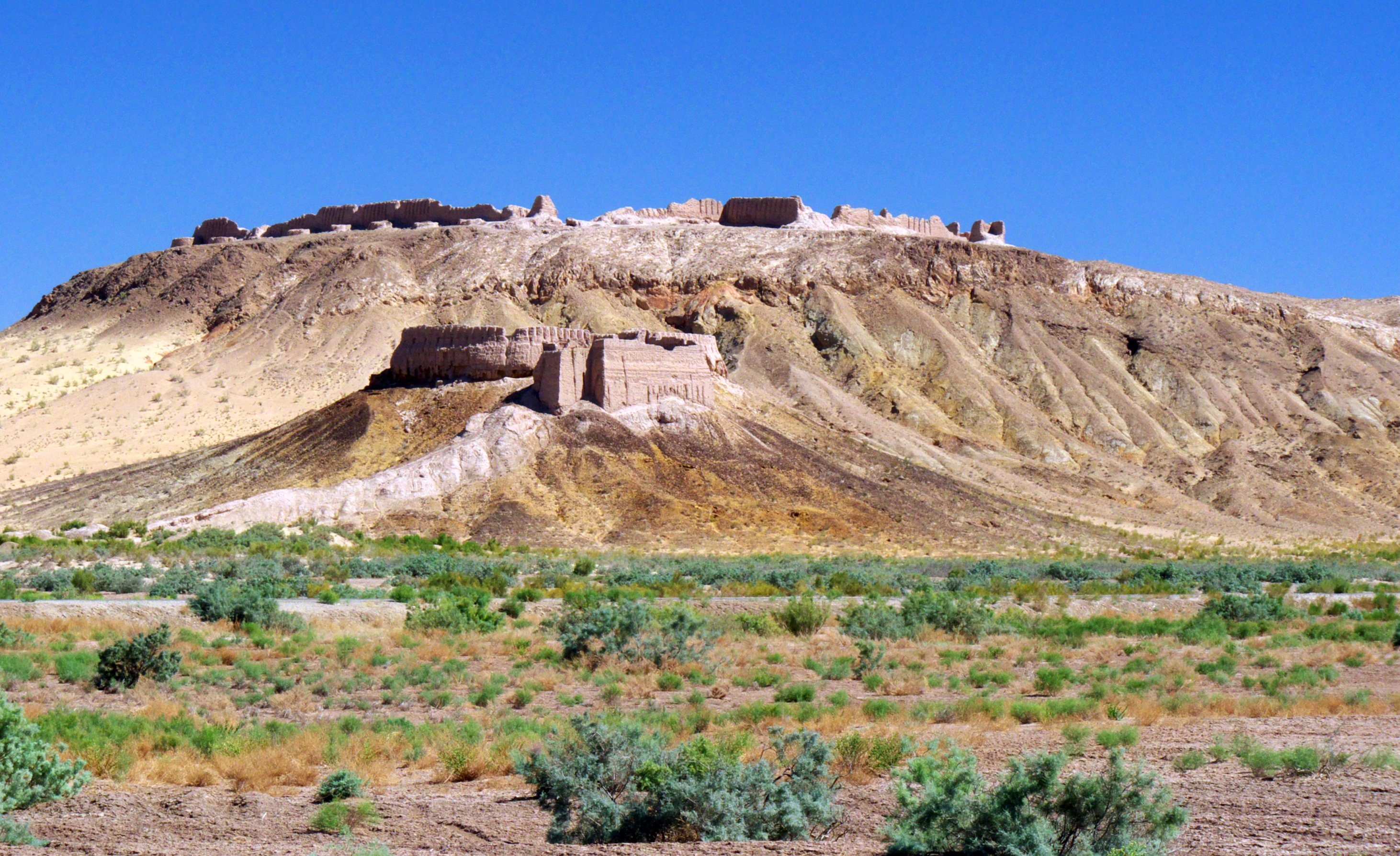
- Ayaz Kala

- Khorazm in Uzbekistan
- Coordinates: 41°20′N 61°0′E
- Country: Uzbekistan
- Established: 1938
- Capital: Urgench

Government
  - Hokim: Jo'rabek Raximov

Area
  - Total: 6,050 km^{2} (2,340 sq mi)
- Elevation: 98 m (322 ft)

Population (2023)
  - Total: 1,958,200
  - Density: 324/km^{2} (838/sq mi)
- Time zone: UTC+5 (East)
- Postal code: 220100
- Area code: +998
- ISO 3166 code: UZ-XO
- Districts: 11
- Cities: 3
- Towns: 56
- Villages: 550
- Website: www.xorazm.uz

The Khorazm Region, also known as the Khorezm or Xorazm Region, (Uzbek: Xorazm viloyati, Хоразм вилояти, خوارزم ولایتی) is a viloyat (region) of Uzbekistan located in the northwest of the country in the lower reaches of the Amu Darya River. It borders Turkmenistan, Karakalpakstan, and the Bukhara Region. It covers an area of 6,050 square kilometres (2,340 mi^{2}). The population was estimated at 1,959,300 (2023), with 67% living in rural areas. The capital is Urgench (pop. est. 147 300). Other major towns include Xonqa, Khiva, Shovot, and Pitnak.

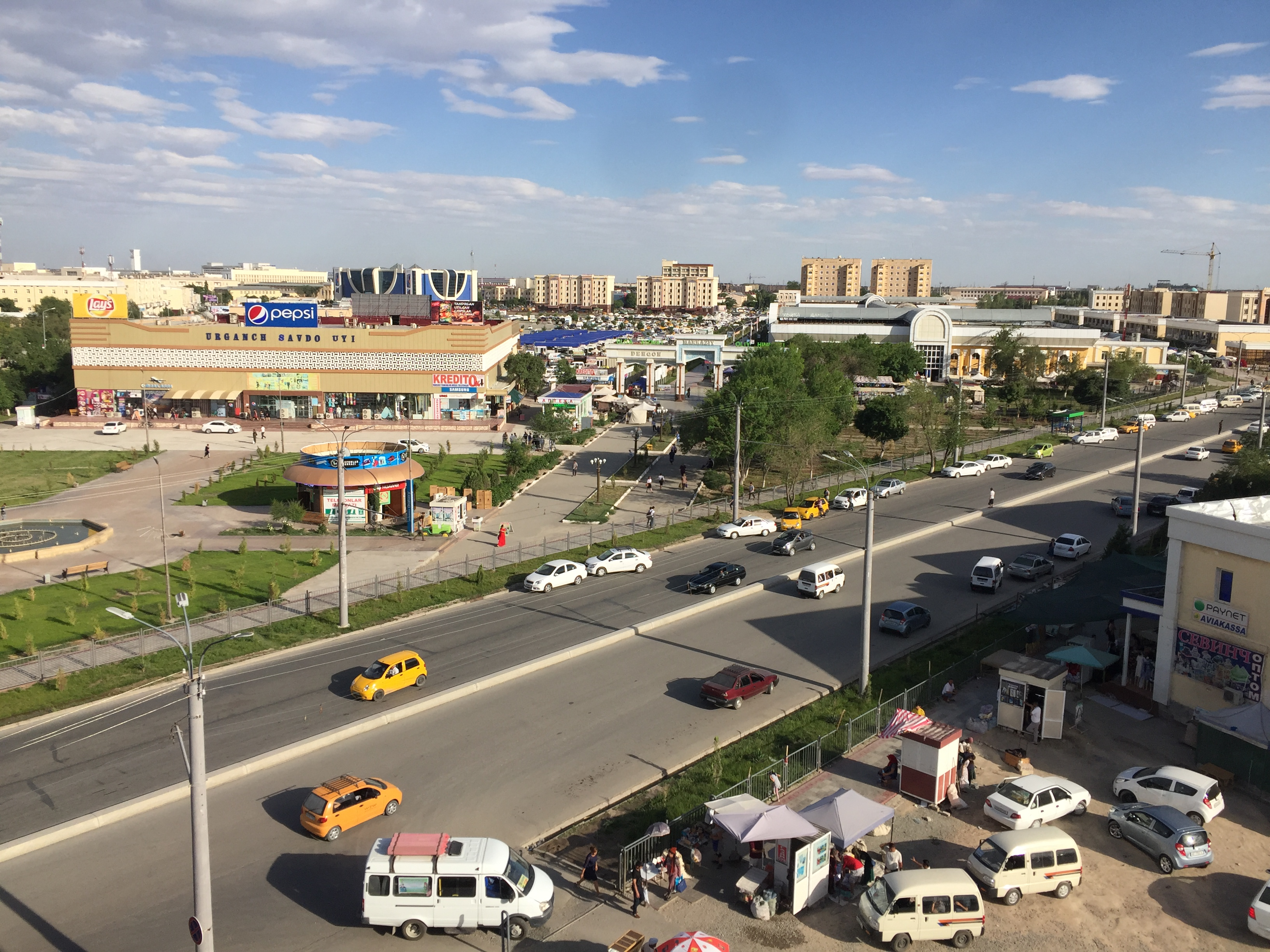
View of the central market area of Urgench from the fifth floor of the Hamkor Bank building. In the background the blue and white building of the "Gipermarket", the largest shopping centre in the town.

The climate is a typically arid continental climate, with cold winters and extremely hot, dry summers.

The city of Khiva in Khorezm Region is a UNESCO World Heritage Site with world-famous architectural monuments, making Khiva one of the main centers for international tourism in the country.

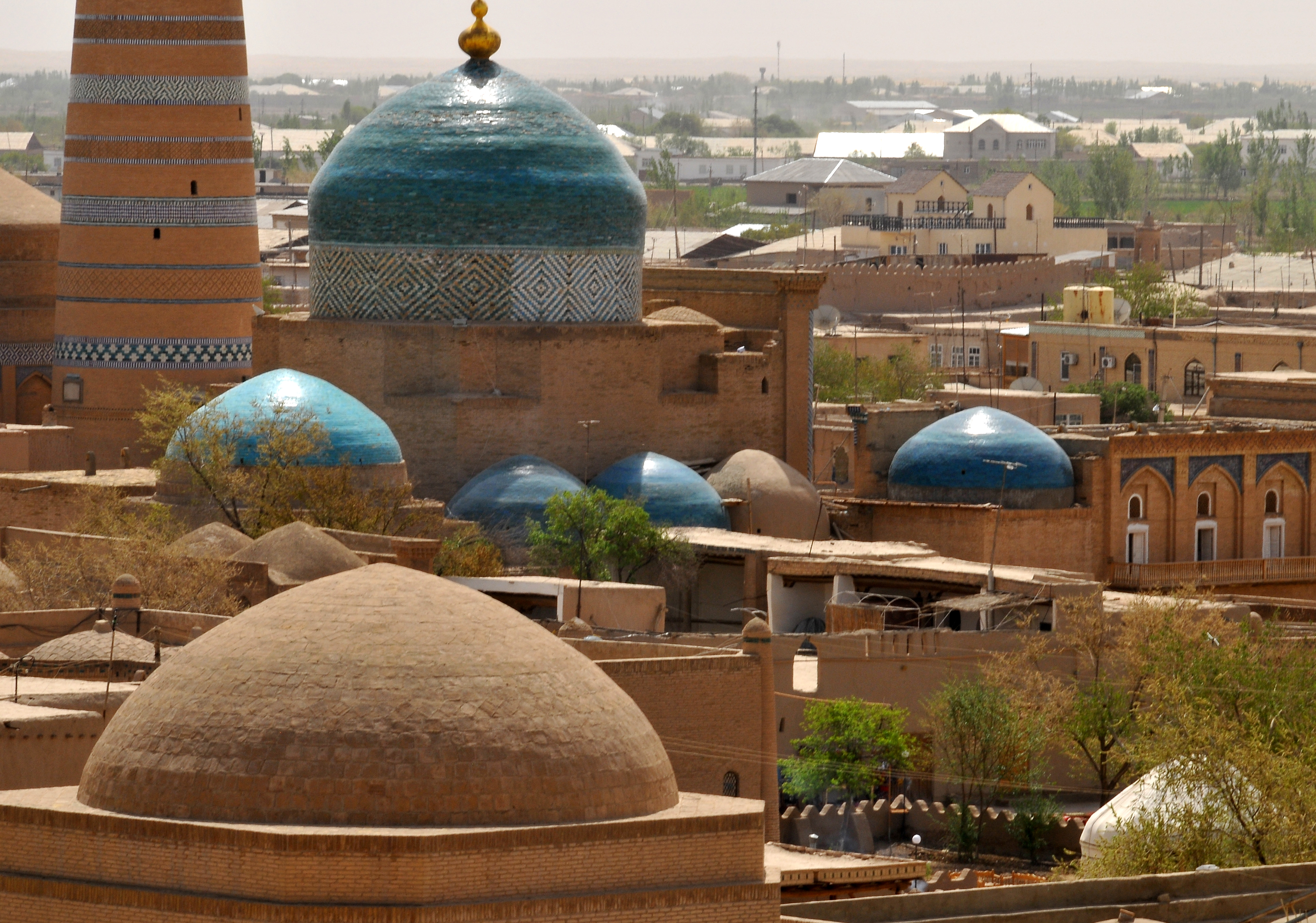
Khiva

The economy of Khorezm Region is primarily based on cotton. Cotton is by far the main crop, although rice production has increased significantly in the last several years. (though the Uzbek government discourages rice production near to deserts, over water usage concerns) There are also many orchards and vineyards, melon and gourd plantations and potato fields. Khorezm Region is famous for its "gurvak" melon in Uzbekistan. Industry is also heavily oriented to cotton, with cotton refining, cottonseed oil extraction and textiles predominating. Khorezm is a place where many famous scholars were born, such as Abu Rayhan Biruni and al-Khwārizmī. The region has a well-developed transportation infrastructure, with over 130 km of railways and 2000 km of surfaced roads. The region is connected by rail to European Russia and the Caucasus. People in Khorezm speak in Khorezmian, which is an Oghuz dialect of Turkic Languages that is different from Karluk (in which most of other Uzbek regions' people speak).

== Administrative divisions ==
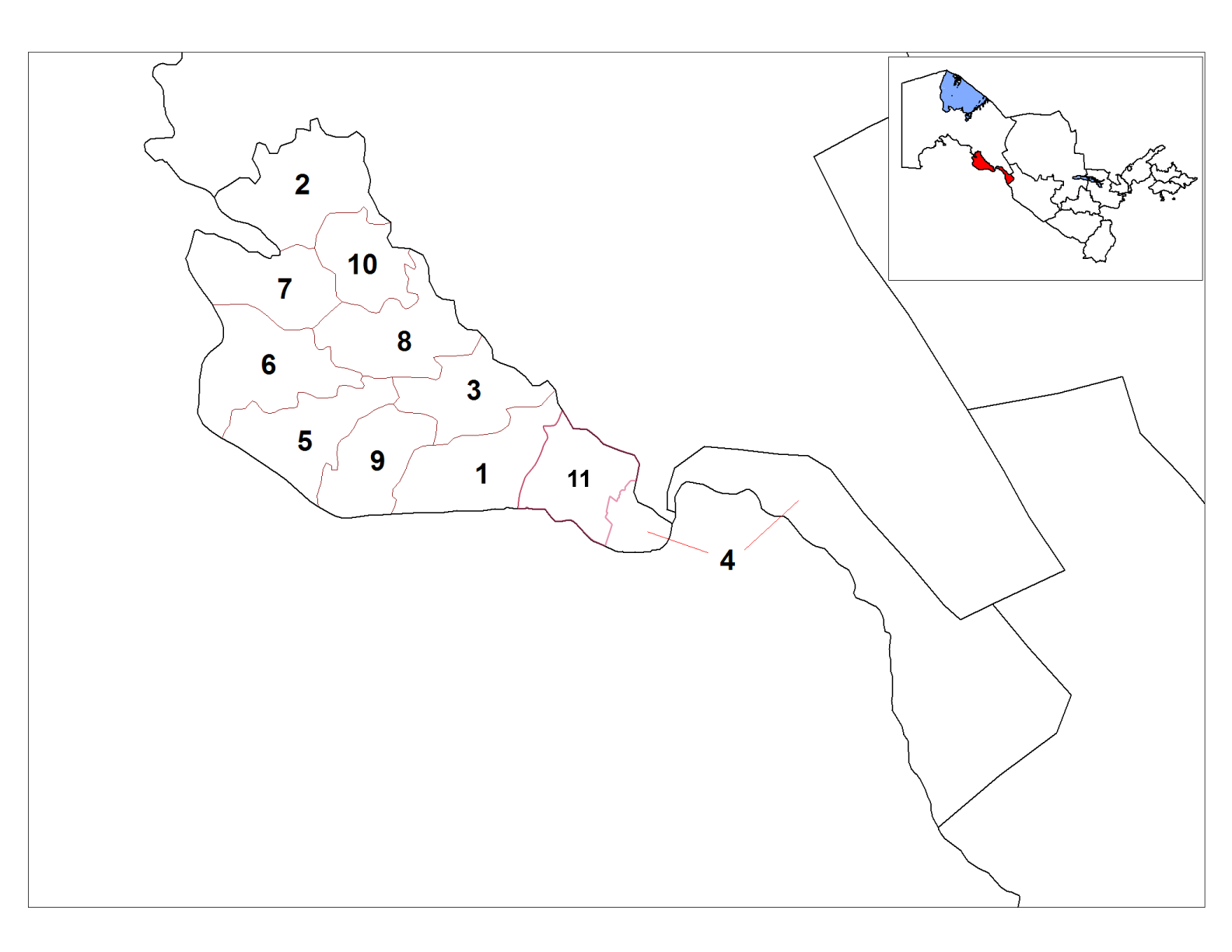
Districts of Khorazm Region before 2020.

The Region consists of 11 districts (listed below) and two district-level cities: Urgench and Khiva.

Key	District name	District capital
1	Bogʻot District	Bogʻot
2	Gurlan District	Gurlan
3	Xonqa District	Xonqa
4	Tuproqqal'a District	Pitnak
5	Khiva District	Khiva
6	Qoʻshkoʻpir District	Qoʻshkoʻpir
7	Shovot District	Shovot
8	Urganch District	Khiva
9	Yangiariq District	Yangiariq
10	Yangibozor District	Yangibozor
11	Hazorasp District	Hazorasp

There are 3 cities (Urgench, Khiva, Pitnak) and 56 urban-type settlements in the Khorazm Region. In March 2020 the new Tuproqqalʼa District was created out of the larger, eastern part of Hazorasp District. Gurlen is one of the most unique districts in the region.

== See also ==
- Khwarazm
- Khwarezmian language
