= Toʻrtkoʻl =

Toʻrtkoʻl: Tórtkúl/Төрткүл (Karakalpak); Toʻrtkoʻl/Тўрткўл (Uzbek); Турткуль (Russian)
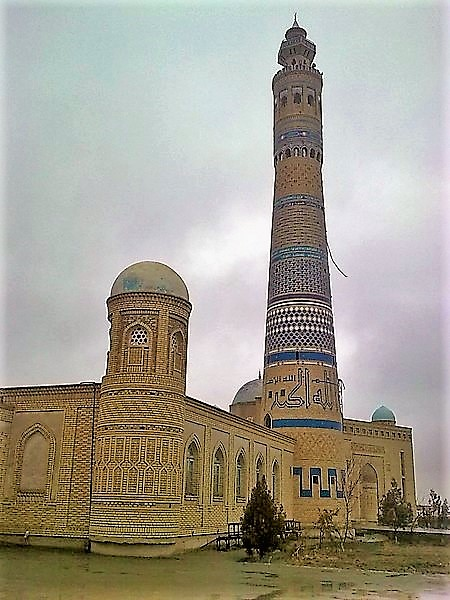
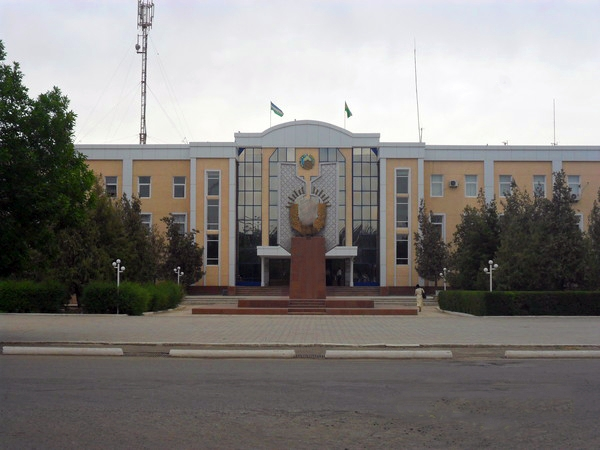
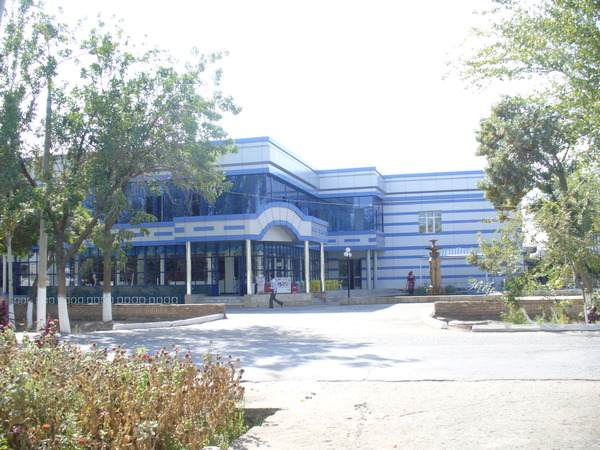

- Location in Karakalpakstan Toʻrtkoʻl (Uzbekistan)
- Coordinates: 41°33′N 61°00′E
- Country: Uzbekistan
- Autonomous Republic: Karakalpakstan
- District: Toʻrtkoʻl District
- Elevation: 85 m (279 ft)

Population (2023)
  - City: 225,635
  - Urban: 84,841
- Postal codes: 231200, 231201, 231202, 231203, 231204

Toʻrtkoʻl (Uzbek: Toʻrtkoʻl/Тўрткўл, [tort.'kol]; Karakalpak: Tórtkúl/Төрткүл, also spelled as Turtkul (Russian: Турткуль, [turt.kulʲ]), is a city in Karakalpakstan, Uzbekistan and the administrative center of the Toʻrtkoʻl District. Its population is 58,200 (2016).

== History ==
The city was founded as a Russian garrison after the Khivan campaign of 1873 and before 1920 was known as Petroaleksandrovsk (Russian: Петро-Александровск). It was then a major jewelry producing center of Uzbekistan, and was equipped with telegraph in 1913 and with a radio station in 1922; the station began regular translations in 1930.

In 1932, the city was renamed to Turtkul (from Turkish törtkül meaning square) and between 1932 and 1939 was the capital of the newly formed autonomous republic of Karakalpakstan. The city was located near the major Amu Darya River, which is known for having significantly altered its flow path several times in its history. In 1932, the Amu Darya once more changed direction and flooded Turtkul. This and past damage by the Amu Darya prompted the authorities to move the capital of Karakalpakstan over 170 km to Nukus in 1939. The river banks were reinforced, stopping further flooding. However, in 1942, the river suddenly flowed towards Turtkul, destroying it overnight. Consequently, in 1949 Turtkul was relocated.

Historical population
Year	Pop.	±% p.a.
1959	10,500	—
1970	18,300	+5.18%
1975	22,000	+3.75%
1990	40,000	+4.07%
1995	45,000	+2.38%
2000	48,600	+1.55%
2016	58,200	+1.13%

== Climate ==
Toʻrtkoʻl has a cold desert climate (Köppen climate classification BWk). The climate is continental, arid and hot. The coldest month is January with the average temperature of −25 °C (−13 °F) and the hottest month is July with an average temperature of 45 °C (113 °F). The annual average is 12.4 °C (54.3 °F). Annual precipitation is 97 mm; it is the highest in March at about 20 mm and is nearly zero between July and September. The evaporation exceeds precipitation on average by 36 times and sometimes up to 270 times.

== Economy ==
The city has a cotton processing factory, a reinforced concrete plant, an asphalt plant and an external section of Nukus Medical School.

== Notable person ==
- Tuti Yusupova, longevity claimant, died in 2015, possibly 134 years old.
