= Khorezm People's Soviet Republic =

1920–1924 Soviet republic in Central Asia

Khorezm People's Soviet Republic (1920–1924) خوارزم خلق شورالر جمهوریتی خارەزم خەلق شورالەر جۇمھۇرییەتى Xorazm xalq sho'ro jumhuriyati (Uzbek) Хорезмская Народная Советская Республика (Russian) Khorezm Socialist Soviet Republic (1923–1924) خارەزم ئیجتیماعیی شورالەر جۇمھۇرییەتى Xorazm ijtimoiy sho'ro jumhuriyati (Uzbek) Хорезмская Социалистическая Советская Республика (Russian)
- 1920–1924
- Flag Emblem (1922–23) Emblem (1923–24)
- Motto: Butun dunyo proletarlari, birlashingiz! "Proletarians of all countries, unite!"
- The Khorezm People's Soviet Republic in 1922
- Capital: Khiva
- Common languages: Russian, Uzbek, Turkmen, Karakalpak
- Religion: Sunni Islam; Sufism (Naqshbandi); Judaism; Atheism (promoted by the Communist Party of Khorezm)
- Government: Soviet republic
- Chairman
  - 1920–1921 (first): Palvanniyaz Khodja Yusupov
  - 1924 (last): Sultan-Kary Dzhumaniyazov
- Historical era: Interwar period
  - Monarchy overthrown: 2 February 1920
  - Republic established: 26 April 1920
  - Brief capture of Khorezm by Junaid Khan: April 1922
  - Part of USSR: 27 October 1924
Preceded by
Khanate of Khiva
Succeeded by
Uzbek SSR
Turkmen SSR
Karakalpak AO
- Today part of: Turkmenistan; Uzbekistan; Kazakhstan

The Khorezm People's Soviet Republic (Note: pre-1921 orthography: خوارزم خلق شورالر جمھوریتی 1921–1926 orthography:Uzbek: خارەزم خەلق شورالەر جۇمھۇرىيەتى, romanized: Xorazm xalq sho'ro jumhuriyati; Russian: Хорезмская Народная Советская Республика, romanized: Khorezmskaya Narodnaya Sovetskaya Respublika) was the state created as the successor to the Khanate of Khiva in February 1920, when the Khan abdicated in response to pressure. It was officially declared by the First Khorezm Kurultay (Assembly) on 26 April 1920. On 20 October 1923, it was transformed into the Khorezm Socialist Soviet Republic. (Note: 1921–1926 orthography:Uzbek: خارەزم ئیجتیماعیی شورالەر جۇمھۇرىيەتى, romanized: Xorazm ijtimoiy sho'ro jumhuriyati; Russian: Хорезмская Социалистическая Советская Республика, romanized: Khorezmskaya Sotsialisticheskaya Sovetskaya Respublika).

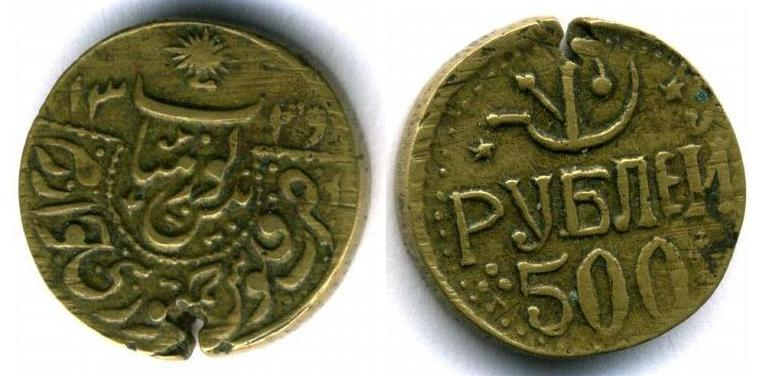
500-roubles coin of 1920–21

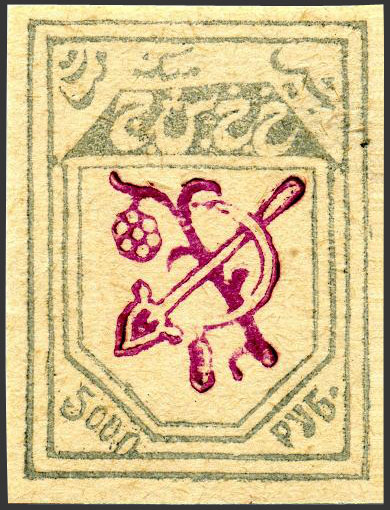
Postage stamp of 1922

On 27 October 1924 the Khorezm SSR was divided between the Uzbek and Turkmen SSRs and the Karakalpak Autonomous Oblast as part of the delimitation of Central Asia according to nationalities. The history of this short-lived republic remains murky and the way its government functioned is not largely clear. The government officials fervently opposed the delimitation plans of the Khorezmian Republic (which had to be carried out under Stalin’s orders) but in the end they were forced to concede.

== Politics ==
=== Political leaders ===
Denotes Acting leader

Name	Took office	Left office	Party	Notes
Chairman of the Revolutionary Committee
Mulla Dzhumaniyaz Sultanmuradov	2 February 1920	26 April 1920	Communist Party of Khorezm	
Chairmen of the Presidium of the Assembly (Kurultoy) of People's Representatives
Palvanniyaz Khodja Yusupov	26 April 1920	6 March 1921	Communist Party of Khorezm	
Dzhabbarbergen Kuchkarov	6 March 1921	15 May 1921	Communist Party of Khorezm	Continued as supreme authority to 23 May 1921
Khudaybergen Divanov	15 May 1921	23 May 1921	Communist Party of Khorezm	
Chairmen of the Presidium of the Central Executive Committee
Madrakhim Allabergenov	23 May 1921	5 September 1921	Communist Party of Khorezm	
Mulla Ata-Maksum Madrakhimov	5 September 1921	27 November 1921	Communist Party of Khorezm	
Yangibay Muradov	27 November 1921	23 July 1922	Communist Party of Khorezm	
Abdulla Khodzhayev "Khadzhi Baba"	23 July 1922	20 October 1922	Communist Party of Khorezm	1st term
Atadzhan Safayev	20 October 1922	26 March 1923	Communist Party of Khorezm	
Abdulla Khodzhayev "Khadzhi Baba"	March 1923	20 October 1923	Communist Party of Khorezm	2nd term
Karim Safayev	20 October 1923	26 March 1924	Communist Party of Khorezm	
Mukhamed Abdusalyamov	17 January 1924	19 February 1924	Communist Party of Khorezm	
Sultan-Kary Dzhumaniyazov	26 March 1924	17 September 1924	Communist Party of Khorezm	1st term
Nedirbay Aytakov	17 September 1924	27 October 1924	Communist Party of Khorezm	
Sultan-Kary Dzhumaniyazov	October 1924	23 November 1924	Communist Party of Khorezm	2nd term

== Geography ==
The Khorezm People's National Republic bordered on the Turkestan Autonomous Soviet Socialist Republic to the north and to the south, and on the Bukharan People's Soviet Republic to the east. Its western border was a rough continuation of the western coast of Aral Sea, bordering on what was then the Kirghiz ASSR (today's western Kazakhstan). It had an area of 62,200 km^{2} (24,000 sq mi) and a population of more than 600,000 people, mainly Uzbeks (62.5%), Turkmens (28.6%), Kazakhs (3.5%), and Karakalpaks (3.0%). Its capital was Khiva.

== See also ==
- Khwarazm
- Khanate of Khiva
- Bukharan People's Soviet Republic
