= 2021 in Uzbekistan =

Coordinates: 42°N 63°E

- Decades: 2000s; 2010s; 2020s
- See also: Other events of 2021; Timeline of Uzbek history

Individuals and events related to Uzbekistan in 2021.

== Incumbents ==
Photo	Post	Name
	President of Uzbekistan	Shavkat Mirziyoyev
	Prime Minister of Uzbekistan	Abdulla Aripov

== Events ==
=== Ongoing ===
- COVID-19 pandemic in Uzbekistan

=== August ===
- 8 August - Ruling Uzbekistan Liberal Democratic Party nominates incumbent Uzbek President Shavkat Mirziyoyev as presidential candidate for the country's presidential election in October.

=== December ===
- 7 December - An explosion in a two-storey shopping mall in Denau district of Uzbekistans Surkhandarya region has killed two people and injured nine others. Two victims were found under the rubble of the ruined building after the firefighters extinguished the fire. A preliminary investigation is underway, the Uzbek Emergency Ministry said.

== Deaths ==
- 3 February - Alijan Ibragimov, 67, mining executive
- 12 March - Stahan Rakhimov, 83, singer
- 21 March - Xudoyberdi To'xtaboyev, 88, children's author
- 31 March - Tamara Chikunova, 72, human rights activist
- 3 May - Surat Ikramov, 76, human rights activist
- 15 August - Usmankhan Alimov, 71, Islamic cleric
- 13 October - Viktor Bryukhanov, 85, engineer
- 21 November - Bakhtiyor Ikhtiyarov, 81 actor
- 17 December - Sa'dulla Begaliyev, 66/67 politician
- 28 December - Nikolay Shirshov, 47, footballer

== See also ==
- Outline of Uzbekistan
- List of Uzbekistan-related topics
- History of Uzbekistan
