= 2005 in Uzbekistan =

- Decades: 1980s; 1990s; 2000s; 2010s; 2020s
- See also: Other events of 2005; Timeline of Uzbek history

This article is a list of events in the year 2005 in Uzbekistan.

== Incumbents ==
- President: Islam Karimov
- Prime Minister: Shavkat Mirziyoyev

== Events ==
=== May ===
- May 13 - Andijan Massacre
  - Thousands of Uzbeks take over a high security jail in Andijan freeing thousands in protest against the jail sentence of 23 businessmen accused of being Islamic extremists.
  - Violence erupts in Andijan with demands from the rally for the government to resign.
  - Over 500 protesters have been shot dead by riot police.
  - A man with mental illness is shot fatally outside the Israeli embassy in the capital of Tashkent, with government sources alleging him to be a suicide bomber.
- May 14 - Thousands of Uzbeks return to the streets in protests despite the massacre yesterday.
- May 15 - Andijan is sealed shut by the government with British Foreign Secretary Jack Straw telling the BBC that there has been a "clear abuse of human rights" in Uzbekistan.
- May 16 - Uzbek authorities seal another city shut. This time, it is Qorasuv near the border to Kyrgyzstan where many have fled the violence.
- May 18 - The border town of Qorasuv is claimed to be under control of a new Islamic administration led by Baxtiyor Rahimov.
- May 19 - Qorasuv is retaken by the Uzbek military and arrest Rahimov. Officials claim 169 were killed in the unrest but many sources claim over 500 have been killed.

=== June ===
- June 7 - Human Rights Watch demands an investigation into the unrest and accuses the government of covering up a massacre.
