= 2018 in Uzbekistan =

- Decades: 1990s; 2000s; 2010s; 2020s
- See also: Other events of 2018; Timeline of Uzbek history

Events in the year 2018 in Uzbekistan.

== Incumbents ==
- President: Shavkat Mirziyoyev
- Prime Minister: Abdulla Aripov

== Events ==
=== Sports ===
- 9 to 25 February – Uzbekistan participated at the 2018 Winter Olympics in PyeongChang, South Korea, with 2 competitors in 2 sports, alpine skiing and figure skating.
- 9 to 18 March – Uzbekistan participated at the 2018 Winter Paralympics in PyeongChang, South Korea

== Deaths ==
- 20 March – Dilbar Abdurahmonova, musician, People's Artist of the USSR (b. 1936).
- 25 April – Shuhrat Abbosov, actor, film director, screenwriter and film producer (b. 1931)
- 17 August – Halima Xudoyberdiyeva, writer and poet (b. 1947).
