= 2020 in Uzbekistan =

- Decades: 2000s; 2010s; 2020s
- See also: Other events of 2020; Timeline of Uzbek history

Events in the year 2020 in Uzbekistan.

== Incumbents ==
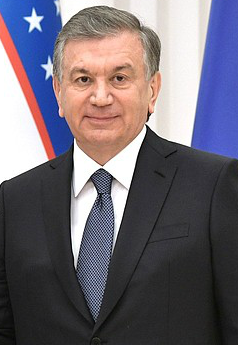
Mirziyoyev in 2018

- President: Shavkat Mirziyoyev
- Prime Minister: Abdulla Aripov
- Chairman of the Senate: Tanzila Norbaeva
- Speaker of the Legislative Chamber: Nurdinjon Ismoilov

== Events ==
=== January ===
- January 5 – 2nd round of the 2019–20 Uzbek parliamentary election.

=== March ===
- March 15 – The first COVID-19 case in the country is confirmed, resulting in kindergartens, schools, and borders being closed.
- Since March 16 – Uzbekistan have been banned from gathering mass events gather with the participation of more than 10,000 participants.
- March 22 – The country ordered companies in Tashkent to do remote working, as well as making protective masks mandatory.
- March 27 – The first COVID-19 death was reported in the country.

== Deaths ==
=== March ===
- March 9 – Azim Suyun, poet (b. 1948).

== See also ==
=== Country overviews ===
- Uzbekistan
- History of Uzbekistan
- Outline of Uzbekistan
- Government of Uzbekistan
- Politics of Uzbekistan
- List of years in Uzbekistan

=== Related timelines for current period ===
- 2020
- 2020 in politics and government
- 2020s
