= 2004 in Uzbekistan =

- Decades: 1980s; 1990s; 2000s; 2010s; 2020s
- See also: Other events of 2004; Timeline of Uzbek history

This article is a list of events in the year 2004 in Uzbekistan.

== Incumbents ==
- President: Islam Karimov
- Prime Minister: Shavkat Mirziyoyev

== Events ==
=== January ===
- January 13 - Uzbekistan Airways Flight 1154 crashes in the capital, Tashkent, killing all 37 people on board.
