= 2015 in Uzbekistan =

- Decades: 1990s; 2000s; 2010s; 2020s
- See also: Other events of 2015; Timeline of Uzbek history

The following lists events that happened during 2015 in Uzbekistan.

== Incumbents ==
- President: Islam Karimov
- Prime Minister: Shavkat Mirziyoyev

== Events ==
=== January ===
- January 4 - Parliamentary elections were held with a second round.

=== March ===
- March 29 - Voters go to the polls for a presidential election with incumbent President Islam Karimov winning the election with 90% of the vote.
