= 2006 in Uzbekistan =

- Decades: 1980s; 1990s; 2000s; 2010s; 2020s
- See also: Other events of 2006; Timeline of Uzbek history

The following lists events that happened during 2006 in Uzbekistan.

== Incumbents ==
- President: Islam Karimov
- Prime Minister: Shavkat Mirziyoyev

== Events ==
=== March ===
- March 20 - The UN's refugee agency, the UNHCR, says it has been ordered to leave Uzbekistan within one month.

=== September ===
- September 21 - Komiljon Usmanov is on trial for "threatening Uzbekistan's constitutional order and public security," and is accused of allegedly leading the banned Hizb ut-Tahrir organization. Usmanov was sentenced in 2001 to 10 years in jail on similar charges, but was freed under an amnesty. He maintains his innocence.

=== October ===
- October 16 - President Islam Karimov fires Saidullo Begaliev, Governor of Andijan, for "short-sighted policies" and "lack of attention to the people's needs" that led to the Andijan massacre in 2005. Karimov appoints Ahmad Usmonov as Begaliev's replacement.
- October 19 - An Uzbek military Antonov An-2 aircraft crashes near Tashkent killing all of the 15 people on board. The Uzbek Emergency Ministry says the pilots lost control of the plane while trying to land.
- October 23 - The Initiative Group of Independent Rights Defenders in Uzbekistan demands the Karimov administration release political opposition leader Sanjar Umarov, calling the case against him "entirely fabricated." Uzbek authorities arrested Umarov in 2005.

=== November ===
- November 13 - The European Union has renewed diplomatic sanctions for Uzbekistan. The sanctions, which have been violated repeatedly by the governments of Britain and Germany, prohibit the sale of weapons to the Uzbek government and visits from EU officials to Uzbekistan or vice versa. The sanctions were originally implemented after the Uzbek government would not allow an international investigation into the terrorist uprising in Andijan.

=== December ===
- December 14 - Uzbekistan nearly doubles the price of natural gas it sells to Kyrgyzstan from US$55 to US$100 (£51) per 1,000 cubic meters of gas amid growing tension between the two nations over alleged spying.
