= Abu Hafs Kabir Bukhari Memorial Complex =

Abu Hafs Kabir mausoleum
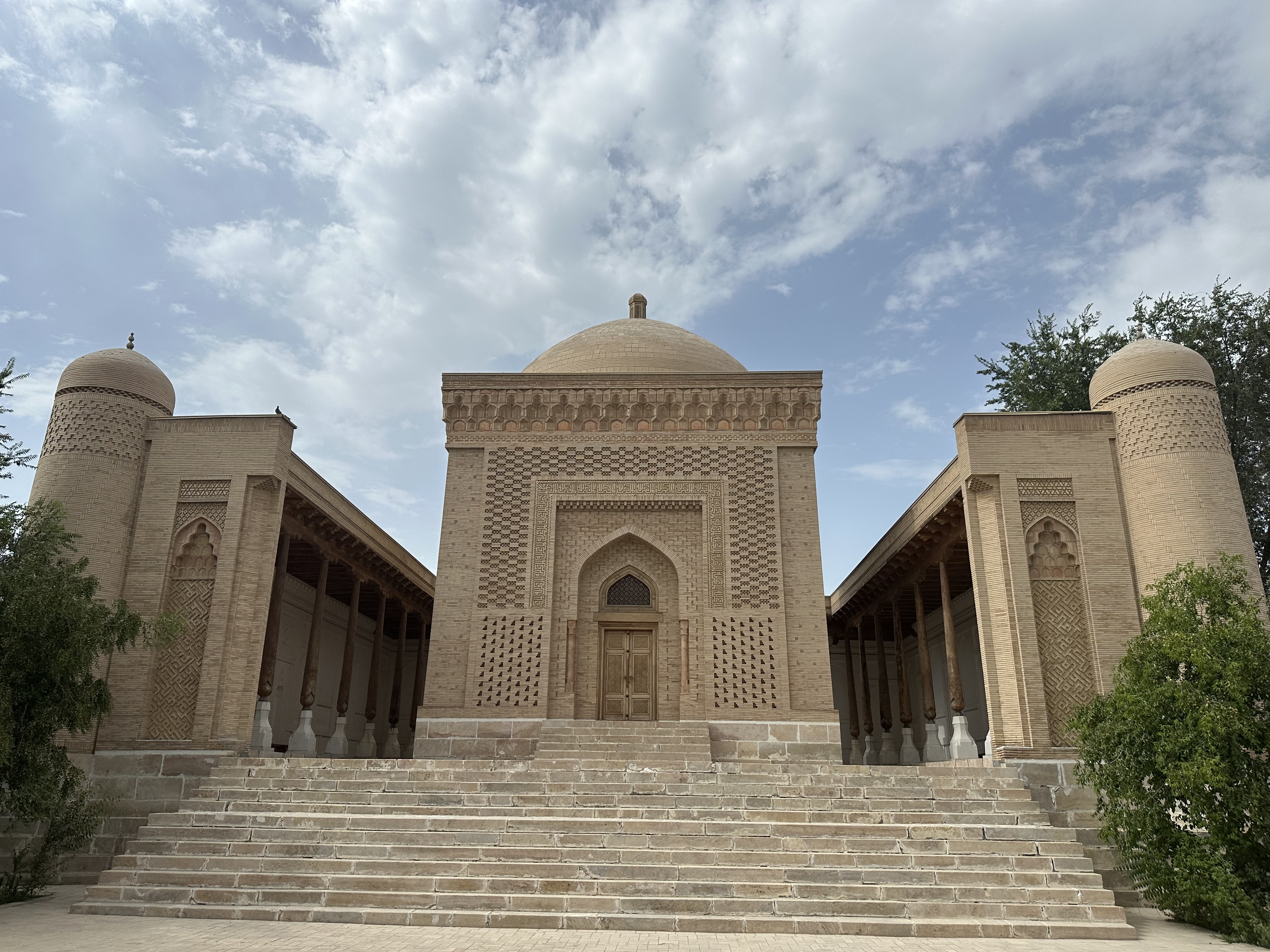
- Abu Hafs Kabir mausoleum
- Type: Mausoleum
- Location: Bukhara, Uzbekistan
- Coordinates: 39°47′07″N 64°24′37″E
- Built: 2009–2010
- Architect: Mahmud Akhmedov

Abu Hafs Kabir Bukhari Memorial Complex is an architectural monument located in Bukhara. The complex consists of Abu Hafs Kabir Bukhari Mausoleum, Hazrat Imam's cemetery, a mosque, a minaret, a pool and a shrine. The mausoleum is included in the national list of real estate objects of the material and cultural heritage of Uzbekistan.

== History ==
The mausoleum and memorial complex were built in 2009–2010. The Abu Hafs Kabir Bukhari complex was rebuilt in 2009–2010. The mausoleum built for Abu Hafs Kabir Bukhari in the 9th century was demolished during the Soviet rule, and the pool in the complex was buried. At the beginning of the 20th century, there were Abu Hafs Kabir grave and three graves on the north side of Hazrat Imam's cemetery. In this cemetery, there was an inscription in the book "Teacher of the scholars in Movarounnahr".

The architectural complex had a large pool, a minaret, a palace and a mausoleum. The complex mosque was built in the 16th century, and the Surah "Ikhlas" of the Quran is written in white letters on a blue background on the mihrab on the qibla wall. During the years of Uzbekistan's independence, the complex was beautified and a monument erected around the mausoleum at the initiative of the governor of Bukhara Region, Samoyiddin Husenov. A gate decorated with walls with domed patterns was built in the architectural complex. There are four tombstones decorated with inscriptions inside the mausoleum in the complex. The architect of the mausoleum was Mahmud Akhmedov, and the tombstones in the mausoleum are made of marble. Gravestones were found in the tomb of Hazrat Imam during archaeological work and studied. These tombstones belong to the 8th–10th centuries and are written in script.

== Sources ==
- Ражабов Қ, Иноятов С. (2016). Бухоро тарихи. Tошкент: Тафаккур нашриёти. p. 460. ISBN 978-9943-24-119-0.
- Абдухолиқов Ф; Ртвиладзе Э; Раззоқов А; Раҳимов К; Ҳакимов А; Абдуҳалимов Б; Мансуров А; Маннонов А; Муҳамедов Н (2016). Ўзбекистон обидаларидаги битиклар: Бухоро. Тошкент: Uzbekistan Today. p. 560. ISBN 978-9943-4510-5-6.
