= 2012 in Uzbekistan =

- Decades: 1990s; 2000s; 2010s; 2020s
- See also: Other events of 2012; Timeline of Uzbek history

The following lists events that happened during 2012 in Uzbekistan.

== Incumbents ==
- President: Islam Karimov
- Prime Minister: Shavkat Mirziyoyev

== Events ==
=== April ===
- April 3 - Tajikistan accuses Uzbekistan of imposing an economic blockade.

=== June ===
- June 29 - Uzbekistan quits the Russian-led Collective Security Treaty Organization.
