= 2022 in Uzbekistan =

Coordinates: 42°N 63°E

- Decades: 2000s; 2010s; 2020s
- See also: Other events of 2022; Timeline of Uzbek history

Individuals and events related to Uzbekistan in 2022.

== Incumbents ==
Photo	Post	Name
	President of Uzbekistan	Shavkat Mirziyoyev
	Prime Minister of Uzbekistan	Abdulla Aripov

== Events ==
Ongoing: COVID-19 pandemic in Uzbekistan

- 25 January – Millions of people are left without electricity after a major power outage affects Kazakhstan, Kyrgyzstan and Uzbekistan. Uzbekistan's energy ministry reports that the power outage had been triggered by an "energy imbalance" in Kazakhstan's power grid.
- 1 July – Protests occur in the autonomous region of Karakalpakstan against a proposed constitutional change that would strip the region of its autonomy.
- 2 July – 2022 Karakalpak protests: The government of Uzbekistan drops plans to strip Karakalpakstan of its autonomy amid widespread protests in the region. Internet access is restricted as regional protests continue for a second day, with the government accusing a "criminal gang" of trying to seize government buildings in Karakalpakstan.
- 3 July – Five people are killed and thousands are injured after mass protests in Nukus, Karakalpakstan, Uzbekistan. President of Uzbekistan Shavkat Mirziyoyev accuses "rioters" of violence.
- 4 July – The government of Uzbekistan says 18 people have been killed and 243 others injured as protests appear to stabilise in Karakalpakstan, though concerns over the possibility of ethnic conflict remain.
- 5 July – Five rockets are fired into Uzbekistan from Afghanistan, landing in the city of Termez. Government officials report that none of the missiles exploded and that minor damage occurred to four homes.
- 9 August – Uzbek chess grandmaster Nodirbek Abdusattorov wins the 44th Chess Olympiad.
- 10 August – Uzbekistan's embassy in Russia warns its citizens not to join Russian forces invading Ukraine, saying that those who do so will be criminally liable for mercenaryism upon returning to Uzbekistan.
- 25 September – Uzbekistan suspends the use of Russia's card payment system Mir. The move was supposedly warranted by the need "to carry out the necessary technical procedures" and was not related to sanctions.
- 2022 Russian mobilization: Uzbekistan says that it will not deport Russians fleeing conscription.
- 29 December – Eighteen children die in Uzbekistan after drinking a cough syrup manufactured by Indian drug maker Marion Biotech.

== Deaths ==
- 15 February – Rustam Akramov, 73, football manager

== See also ==
- History of Uzbekistan
- Outline of Uzbekistan
- List of Uzbekistan-related topics
