= 2019 in Uzbekistan =

- Decades: 1990s; 2000s; 2010s; 2020s
- See also: Other events of 2019; Timeline of Uzbek history

Events in the year 2019 in Uzbekistan.

== Incumbents ==
- President: Shavkat Mirziyoyev
- Prime Minister: Abdulla Aripov

== Events ==
- 2019 Uzbekistan Super League
- 2 February – The Agency for Information and Mass Communication is established
- 11 February – President Mirziyoyev fired SNB head Ikhtiyor Abdullayev after he was accused of conducting surveillance on President Mirziyoyev's personal phone.
- 18 to 21 April – South Korean President Moon Jae In conducts a state visit to Tashkent
- 23 to 28 April – 2019 Asian Cycling Championships in Tashkent
- 2019 FC Bunyodkor season
- 12 April – President Mirziyoyev names his daughter Saida, as the deputy director of the Agency for Information and Mass Communication.
- 10 June – the 14th annual edition of AgroExpo Uzbekistan will take place
