= Surat Ikramov =

Uzbek activist (1945–2021)

Surat Khatamovich Ikramov (1945 – 3 May 2021) was an Uzbek human rights activist and a critic of Uzbekistan’s authoritarian government. Ikramov was the chair of the Initiative Group of Independent Human Rights Defenders. Since its founding in 2002, the group became one of the most prolific chroniclers of human rights abuses in Uzbekistan, Central Asia's most populous state and an important Western ally in the Afghanistan war.

== Biography ==
Ikramov was born in Tashkent in 1945. He studied radio technology and worked in a printing house, a photographic studio, and a college as a teacher, and later headed a company that produced educational materials.

In 2003, Ikramov was kidnapped, severely beaten, bound in a sack, and thrown into a secluded ditch. Given his background, Human Rights Watch stated that "we suspect that there may be more to this incident than mere criminal thuggery." Ikramov regularly attended trials, spoke with victims, and compiled dispatches that he emailed to diplomats, journalists, and government officials. In a country with no independent media, his dispatches provided a rare window into the workings of Uzbekistan's repressive legal and political system. An archive of his dispatches is available at www.ignpu.net.

Much of Ikramov's work focused on exposing mistreatment, the alleged fabrication of evidence, and the torture of detainees, particularly those accused of religious extremism. An engineer by training, Ikramov became a human rights defender by accident. In the 1990s, he set up a small printing business. When a state‑owned factory broke his equipment, he sued and lost. He then got in touch with other human rights defenders and eventually became one himself. Ikramov was unstinting in his criticism of the ruling regime of the long‑time President Islam Karimov. In a May 2010 dispatch marking the fifth anniversary of a government crackdown on protesters in Andijan, Ikramov called it "one of the most horrible crimes of the Karimov regime" that remained "uninvestigated and unpunished". The government claims it was fighting terrorists.

Ikramov was sued in a case involving the suspicious death of a famous Uzbek singer. According to the official version, she had hanged herself. But Ikramov suggested that she might have been murdered and implicated the relatives of the singer's boyfriend, who was a brother of Uzbekistan's interior minister. A court ruled against Ikramov and ordered him to pay a fine to the plaintiffs. Ikramov appealed.

Ikramov died in Tashkent on 3 May 2021.
