= Baxtiyor Rahimov =

Uzbekistani politician

Baxtiyor Rahimov (Russified form Bakhtiyar Rahimov is also used; Russian: Бахтия́р Раги́мов) (born c. 1963) is a rebel leader in Uzbekistan who advocates an Islamic republic. He is currently being held by the Uzbek government.

== Background ==
Little is known of Rahimov's background prior to the protests and government attacks in Uzbekistan in May 2005. He had apparently been a farmer and resident of Qorasuv, a small town on the border with Kyrgyzstan. After a series of protests and reprisals centered in Andijan, a provincial capital some 50 km (31 mi) from Qorasuv, thousands of Uzbeks stormed the border town in attempt to flee the country. On approximately May 13, 2005, Rahimov and persons loyal to him seized control of Qorasuv.

Rahimov announced plans to form an Islamic state in place of what are now Central Asian countries. He gave an interview with the Associated Press while seated on horseback, during which he was quoted saying "We will be building an Islamic state here in accordance with the Quran" and citing his goals of reaching Kyrgyzstan, Tajikistan, Turkmenistan, "and the rest of the world". The AP report indicated that, as of May 17, no Uzbek military forces were present in the area, but contained only speculation as to the numbers of Rahimov's followers. Rahimov stated, "We don't have weapons, but if they come and attack us we will fight even with knives."

On May 18, 2005, Rahimov was captured by government forces after minimal resistance. Also arrested were Rahimov's 14-year-old son and around twenty other people who may or may not have ties to him. The occupation of Qorasuv appears to have eliminated the last pocket of resistance stemming from the May, 2005 protests. Despite the release of most of those arrested, protests demanding freedom for Rahimov continued on May 19 and 20 alongside a heavy military presence.
