= Dilbar Abdurahmonova =

Russian-born Uzbekistani violinist and conductor

- Born: May 1, 1956; Moscow, Russian SFSR, Soviet Union
- Died: March 20, 2018 (aged 61) Tashkent, Uzbekistan
- Occupations: Conductor, violinist, educator

Dilbar Gʻulomovna Abdurahmonova (Uzbek: Dilbar Gʻulomovna Abdurahmonova; May 1, 1936 – March 20, 2018) was a Soviet and Uzbek conductor, violinist, educator, and People's Artist of the USSR (1977). She was born on May 1, 1936, in Moscow and died on March 20, 2018, in Tashkent. She was the first female conductor in Uzbekistan.

== Early life ==
She was born on May 1, 1936, in Moscow. From 1948 to 1955, she studied at the R. Gliere Tashkent Music School (now the Republican Special Music Academic Lyceum named after R. Gliere) in the violin class (simultaneously attending the 110th Mathematical School). She graduated from the Tashkent State Conservatory (now the State Conservatory of Uzbekistan) in the violin class under the guidance of B. Titel in 1959, and the Department of Opera-symphonic Conducting (M. Ashrafi's class) in 1960.

== Career ==
During her studies, from 1957 to 1960, she worked as a violinist in the State Theater of Opera and Ballet named after Navoiy(now the State Academic Bolshoi Theater named after Navoiy).

In 1957, as a student conductor, she participated in the World Festival of Youth and Students in Moscow.

Starting in 1960, she worked as a conductor at the State Theater of Opera and Ballet named after Navoi

From 1974 to 1990, she served as the chief conductor and artistic director of the theater, and later as a conductor and director.

From 1959, she participated in cultural and artistic events representing Uzbekistan abroad. She toured in cities across the USSR and also in Egypt (1966), Germany, Romania, Thailand, and Singapore.

In 1982, she completed her studies in the Department of Economics and Theatrical Planning at the A. N. Ostrovsky Tashkent Theater and Art Institute (now the State Institute of Arts and Culture of Uzbekistan) through distance learning. She taught opera performance at the State Conservatory of Uzbekistan as a professor. She was a member of the Communist Party of the Soviet Union (CPSU) from 1965.

Abdurahmonova last performed in December 2017, and was sent to hospital in February 2018. She died on March 20, 2018 in Tashkent, aged 81. Buried in cemetery «Minor».

== Family ==
Father – Gyulam Abdurakhmanov (1910–1987), an opera singer and People's Artist of the Uzbek SSR (1950). Mother – Zuhra Fayzieva, an opera singer. Husband (since 1960) – Utkur Abdullaevich Shamuratov (born 1934), an engineer. Daughters – Lola and Rano.

== Awards ==
=== Soviet ===
- People's Artist of the Uzbek SSR (1969).
- State Prize of the Uzbek SSR Named After Hamza (1973) – for the staging of the ballet "Tanovar" by A. Kozlovsky.
- People's Artist of the USSR (30 December 1977)
- Order of Friendship of Peoples (1986).

=== Uzbekistani ===
- Order of Labor Glory (2001).
- Order "For Selfless Service" (2012).

== Works ==
The conductor's repertoire includes over 60 operatic and ballet productions, including:

=== Operas ===
- "Aida" by G. Verdi
- "The Pranks of Maysara" by S. Yudakov
- "Rigoletto" by G. Verdi
- "Samson and Delilah" by C. Saint-Saëns
- "The Heart of a Mother" by Kh. Rakhimov
- "The Telephone" by G. Menotti
- "La Traviata" by G. Verdi
- "Il Trovatore" by G. Verdi
- "Faust" by C. F. Gounod
- "The Khivin Order" by R. Abdullaev
- "The Human Voice" by F. Poulenc
- "The Hat with Ears" by E. Khagagortyan
- "Scheherazade" (suite) by N. Rimsky-Korsakov
- "The Barber of Seville" by G. Rossini
- "The Elixir of Love" by G. Donizetti
- "Masked Ball" by G. Verdi
- "Buran" by M. Ashrafi and S. Vasilenko
- "Return" by Ya. Sabzanov
- "Dreadful Days" by B. Brovtsyn
- "The Pearl Fishers" by G. Bizet
- "Layli and Majnun" by R. Gliere and T. Sadykov
- "The Fiery Angel" by S. Prokofiev
- "Omar Khayyam" by M. Bafoyev
- "Optimistic Tragedy" by A. Kholminov
- "Othello" by G. Verdi
- "Pagliacci" by R. Leoncavallo
- "Peter the Great" by A. Petrov
- "The Queen of Spades" by P. Tchaikovsky

=== Ballets ===
- "The Fountain of Bakhchisarai" by B. Asafyev
- "The Amulet of Love" by M. Ashrafi
- "Love and the Sword" by M. Ashrafi
- "Anna Karenina" by R. Shchedrin
- "The Young Lady and the Hooligan" by D. Shostakovich
- "La Bayadère" to the music of L. Minkus
- "Bolero" by M. Ravel
- "Doctor Aybolit" by I. Morozov
- "Don Juan" by L. Feigin
- "Giselle" by A. Adan
- "The Golden Key" by B. Zeydman
- "Cinderella" by S. Prokofiev
- "Spanish Miniatures" folk music
- "Coppélia" by L. Delibes
- "Carmen Suite" by G. Bizet-R. Shchedrin
- "The Corsair" by A. Adan
- "Kyrk-Kyz" (Forty Girls) by L. Feigin
- "Swan Lake" by P. Tchaikovsky
