= Sa'dulla Begaliyev =

Uzbek politician (1954–2021)

Hokim of Andijan Region
- In office 25 May 2004 – 13 October 2006
- Preceded by: Qobiljon Obidov
- Succeeded by: Ahmadjon Usmonov

Minister of Agriculture and Water Resources
- In office 25 May 2003 – 25 May 2004

Personal details
- Born: 1954 Oltinkoʻl District, Uzbek SSR, Soviet Union
- Died: 17 December 2021 (aged 66–67) Tashkent, Uzbekistan

Saʼdulla Begaliyevich Begaliyev (1954 – 17 December 2021) was an Uzbek politician. He served as Minister of Agriculture and Water Resources from 2003 to 2004 and was hokim of Andijan Region from 2004 to 2006.

He died on 17 December 2021 in the city of Tashkent.
