= 2026 in Uzbekistan =

- Decades: 2000s; 2010s; 2020s
- See also: Other events of 2026; Timeline of Uzbek history

Individuals and events related to Uzbekistan in 2026.

== Events ==
=== February ===
- 6–22 February – Uzbekistan at the 2026 Winter Olympics

=== March ===
- 3 March – President Mirziyoyev signs a decree to increase protection against women and children and apply harsher penalties against harassment, violence and pedophilia.
- 26 March – Tajikistani President Emomali Rahmon arrives in Uzbekistan for a state visit, during which the Tajikistan embassy is officially inaugurated in Tashkent.

=== April ===
- 28 April – A court in Switzerland dismisses graft charges against former president Islam Karimov's daughter, Gulnara Karimova, citing her continued house arrest and inability to take part in the trial.

=== June ===
- 8 June – A gas explosion occurs at a filling station in Qashqadaryo Region, killing six people.
- 11 June–19 July – Uzbekistan participates at the 2026 FIFA World Cup.

=== July ===
- 26 July – Ten modernist structures in Tashkent are designated as UNESCO World Heritage Sites.

=== September ===
- 10 September – Two workers are dead after a vehicle tire explodes at Navoi Mining and Metallurgical Company mine.

== Holidays ==
- 1 January – New Year's Day
- 14 January – Day of Defenders of the Native land
- 8 March – International Women's Day
- 20 March – Eid al-Fitr
- 21 March – Nowruz
- 9 May – Day of Memory and Honour
- 27 May – Eid al-Adha
- 1 September – Independence Day
- 1 October – Teachers' Day
- 8 December – Constitution Day

== Art and entertainment ==
- List of Uzbekistani submissions for the Academy Award for Best International Feature Film

== Deaths ==
- 11 February – Qallibek Kamolov, 99, Soviet politician, first secretary of the Karakalpak Regional Committee of the Communist Party of Uzbekistan (1963–1984)
- 12 February – Mirakbar Rahmonqulov, 74, senator (since 2020)
- 20 April – Rim Giniyatullin, 82, minister of land reclamation and water management (1989–1996)
- 4 June – Amin Tojiyev, 79, chairman of the Council of Ministers of Karakalpakstan (1989–1992, 1998–2002)
- 22 August – Sabirzhan Ruziyev, 73, fencer, Olympic silver medallist (1980)

== See also ==
- Outline of Uzbekistan
- List of Uzbekistan-related topics
- History of Uzbekistan
