= 2023 in Uzbekistan =

Coordinates: 42°N 63°E

- Decades: 2000s; 2010s; 2020s
- See also: Other events of 2023; Timeline of Uzbek history

Individuals and events related to Uzbekistan in 2023.

== Incumbents ==
Photo	Post	Name
	President of Uzbekistan	Shavkat Mirziyoyev
	Prime Minister of Uzbekistan	Abdulla Aripov

== Events ==
- 1 January – Uzbekistan's Latin alphabet transition is completed.
- 6 January – State security police in Uzbekistan arrest four people over the deaths of 19 children who consumed a cough syrup product manufactured by Indian drug manufacturer Marion Biotech last week.
- 10 July – 2023 Uzbek presidential election: Uzbek authorities announce that incumbent president Shavkat Mirziyoyev has been re-elected with 87.1% of the votes.
- 28 September – Tashkent explosion: One person is killed and 162 others are injured in an explosion at a warehouse near the airport in Tashkent.

=== Ongoing events ===
- COVID-19 pandemic in Uzbekistan

=== Politics ===
- The number of ministries and government agencies in Uzbekistan are expected to be halved in 2023.

== Deaths ==
- 18 January – Hakim Zaripov, 98, circus performer, trick rider and horse trainer.

== See also ==
- Outline of Uzbekistan
- List of Uzbekistan-related topics
- History of Uzbekistan
