= 2027 in Uzbekistan =

- Decades: 2000s; 2010s; 2020s
- See also: Other events of 2027; Timeline of Uzbek history

Individuals and events related to Uzbekistan in 2027.

== Events ==
=== Predicted and scheduled events ===
- 17 September – 9 October – 2027 FIFA U-20 World Cup in Azerbaijan and Uzbekistan

== Holidays ==
- 1 January – New Year's Day
- 14 January – Day of Defenders of the Native land
- 8 March – International Women's Day
- 9 March – Eid al-Fitr
- 21 March – Nowruz
- 9 May – Day of Memory and Honour
- 16 May – Eid al-Adha
- 1 September – Independence Day
- 1 October – Teachers' Day
- 8 December – Constitution Day

== Art and entertainment ==
- List of Uzbekistani submissions for the Academy Award for Best International Feature Film

== See also ==
- Outline of Uzbekistan
- List of Uzbekistan-related topics
- History of Uzbekistan
