= Human trafficking in Uzbekistan =

Uzbekistan ratified the 2000 UN TIP Protocol in August 2008.

Uzbekistan is a source country for women and girls who are trafficked to the United Arab Emirates (U.A.E.), Kazakhstan, Russia, Thailand, Turkey, India, Indonesia, Israel, Malaysia, South Korea, Japan and Costa Rica for the purpose of commercial sexual exploitation. Men are trafficked to Kazakhstan and Russia for purposes of forced labor in the construction, cotton and tobacco industries. Men and women are also trafficked internally for the purposes of domestic servitude, forced labor in the agricultural and construction industries, and for commercial sexual exploitation. Many school-age children are forced to work in the cotton harvest each year.

In 2008 the government did not take steps to end forced child labor, during the annual cotton harvest. However, in March 2008 Uzbekistan adopted ILO Conventions 138 (on minimum age of employment) and 182 (on elimination of the worst forms of child labor) and is working with ILO on implementation. The Government of Uzbekistan also demonstrated its increasing commitment to combat trafficking in March 2008, by adopting a comprehensive anti-trafficking law. The law establishes a coordination mechanism for government ministries, responsible for various anti-trafficking efforts. The law promises that state funding will be used to provide victim protection and assistance, ensuring that victims will not be punished for acts committed as a result of being trafficked.

The U.S. State Department's Office to Monitor and Combat Trafficking in Persons placed the country in "Tier 3" in 2017.

In 2020, the Government of Uzbekistan did not fully comply with the minimum standards for the elimination of trafficking, though it made significant efforts to do so. Uzbekistan was placed on the Tier 2 Watch List for its failure to provide evidence of increasing efforts to combat severe forms of trafficking over the previous year. Specifically, the government did not amend its criminal code to increase penalties for convicted traffickers, and did not provide financial or in-kind assistance to NGOs, providing assistance to victims during the reporting period.

The country was placed on Tier 2 in 2023.

In 2023, the Organised Crime Index gave the country a score of 7.5 out of 10 for human trafficking, noting that the government has made progress in protecting people.

== Prosecution ==
Uzbekistan reported that improved law enforcement efforts to combat trafficking were effective, but many traffickers served no time in prison during the reporting period. Uzbekistan's current laws do not criminalize all forms of trafficking in persons. Some articles of the government's criminal code are used to prosecute sex trafficking cases and some labor trafficking cases, though current laws do not adequately criminalize all forms of forced labor. Penalties prescribed under the trafficking-related statutes of the criminal code range from five to eight years. However, convicted persons who are given sentences of less than 10 years are often amnestied, and may not serve time in prison. This practice is commensurate with punishments prescribed for others grave crimes, such as rape. Also, first-time female traffickers are more likely to be amnestied than male traffickers due to Uzbek cultural beliefs. Many trafficking offenders are therefore not adequately punished.

In 2007, the police reported 273 trafficking investigations involving 303 suspects, compared with 250 investigations involving 268 suspects reported in 2005, the most recent year available for trafficking data. Authorities prosecuted and convicted 185 suspects for trafficking in 2007, compared to 148 convictions in 2005. As of January 2008, at least 66 traffickers were serving sentences of six months’ to three years’ imprisonment. There were 272 police officers dedicated to combat trafficking in persons, including 118 who worked exclusively on the issue. Anti-trafficking training was added to the curriculum for young officers at the Ministry of Interior training academy in 2007. There were unconfirmed reports of government officials who were involved in trafficking-related bribery and fraud. In March 2008, a member of the lower house of parliament resigned over sex trafficking allegations. There was no government investigation into the allegations at the time of this report.

The Uzbekistan authorities stated that in 2015 they processed 696 investigations, 372 criminal cases and 460 individuals for human trafficking. In 2016, security services in Uzbekistan shut down a criminal group that was engaged in trafficking girls into Turkey, as well as freeing 17 Uzbekistan born girls from sex slavery in Malaysia.

During the 2018 reporting period, the government made significant improvements, but still did not meet the minimum standards for the elimination of trafficking. During the 2017 year, 336,000 workers of the 2.6 million cotton pickers were forced laborers. The country reported a decrease in the identification of victims, and the investigation and prosecution of suspected traffickers. 405 people were convicted for related trafficking crimes, compared to the 451 in 2016.

2019 showed a decrease in the number of investigations, prosecutions, and convictions although the government had provided a more detailed law enforcement report than in previous reporting years. The ILO reported in its 2019 third-party monitoring of child labour and forced labour in the cotton harvest that the numbers of forced pickers had declined by 40% from the previous year.

== Protection ==
The government demonstrated modest improvement in its victim assistance and protection efforts during the reporting period. NGOs reported that growing trafficking awareness and sensitivity towards victims among law enforcement officials. Police, consular officials, and border guards referred women returning from abroad who appeared to be trafficking victims to IOM for assistance. NGOs reported a need for additional victims’ shelters in two other regions of the country. The two existing trafficking shelters in Uzbekistan were funded by foreign donors, but the shelters received no financial or in-kind assistance from the government during the reporting period.

In 2007, NGOs reported assisting 497 victims trafficked for sexual and labor exploitation, compared to 681 reported victims in 2006. While 40 victims assisted law enforcement in trafficking investigations in 2007, many victims remain afraid to provide testimony or information for fear of retribution by their traffickers, and the government provided no victim-witness protection. The new comprehensive anti-trafficking law requires increased protection for victims who are cooperating with investigations. Repatriated victims are asked to sign documentation confessing to their illegal departure from Uzbekistan; however, NGOs reported that identified victims of trafficking were not punished for acts committed as a result of being trafficked.

The government provides funds to the Tashkent Rehabilitation Center for men, women and children that have an official victim status. In the 2015 reporting year the Center assisted 503 victims, more than the 369 reported the previous year.

In 2017, the government identified 440 victims, which was a decrease from the previous years. NGO's and an international organization also had identified and assisted 676 trafficking victims. The number of identified victims fell again in 2018, reporting only 208 victims.

In 2019, the number of identified victims declined once again, but the government increase the funding for victim protection. Approximately 1.2 billion soum (US$126,320) was invested into the operation of the Tashkent-based rehabilitation center, an increase of 475 million soum (US$50,000) compared to 2018.

== Prevention ==
The government continued its prevention efforts during the reporting period. In 2007, the government provided free office space to an anti-trafficking NGO in Jizzakh. More than 200 Uzbek law enforcement officials in all 12 provinces received anti-trafficking training conducted by NGOs in 2007, increasing awareness about the issue among lower-level officers. The government's inter-agency working group on trafficking met five times in 2007 and drafted comprehensive anti-trafficking legislation, which was adopted by Parliament in March 2008 and signed into law by President Islam Karimov.

In order to inform the public about the consequences of human trafficking, the government implemented information boards, presented films and supported theatrical plays, as well as demanding all women under 35 to have an official permission from their parents of husband when traveling abroad.

In 2007, the government reported that there were 360 anti-trafficking articles printed in newspapers and magazines, police officers participated in 184 radio speeches, and 793 television segments on trafficking were aired throughout the country. Most items in the media addressed trafficking for sexual exploitation, although there was limited coverage of labor trafficking as well. The government gave extra scrutiny to unaccompanied young women traveling to recognized trafficking destination countries. Uzbekistan has not ratified the 2000 UN TIP Protocol. Various international campaigns were launched against the Uzbek cotton in 2013, which forced the Uzbekistan government to put a ban on children working that are under the age of 16, although many school children between the ages of 15 and 17 are still forced to leave school to work the cotton harvest.

In 2014, mobile providers began sending out text messages across Uzbekistan warning the public against human trafficking.

Prevention efforts were increased in 2017, and it was also the fourth consecutive year that the government continued to conduct a nationwide campaign to raise awareness about child labour in the cotton harvest. 2017 was also the third year in a row that the government agreed to allow the International Labour Office (ILO) to monitor the cotton harvest.

In April 2018, the government allocated 714 billion soum (US$85.92 million) to a special fund under the Ministry of Employment and Labour Relations to assist in the employment of individuals for public works and put an end to forced labour in those projects. And in September of that same year, the Cabinet of Ministers passed a resolution which was to allow additional support to labour migrants abroad with a budget of 200 billion soum (US$24.07 million). The President of Uzbekistan created the National Commission on Trafficking Persons and Forced Labor (the Commission) in July 2019. It was composed of two high-level sub-committees, one for trafficking in persons chaired by the Minister of Internal Affairs, and one for forced labor chaired by the Minister of Employment and Labor Relations.

In February 2020, representatives of the Cotton Campaigns international coalition held a meeting at the Ministry of Investments and Foreign Trade to discuss and establish a cooperation to form sustainable mechanisms for the prevention of labor offenses in Uzbekistan. At the meeting a close cooperation agreement was reached in order to minimize and prevent specific case violations in the future and to establish a cooperation with the general public and international and non-international government organisations.

On 18 August 2020, President Shavkat Mirziyoyev approved the new version of the "on combating human trafficking" law which forbids the disclosure of information on those victimized and the circumstances of the crimes.

The International Organization for Migration, Istiqbolli Avlod organized the “30 Days in Partnership against Human Trafficking” in 2020, together with over 200 organizations to raise awareness across the Uzbekistan society.
