= Akrom =

Akrom is a given name. Notable people with the name include:

- Akrom Yoʻldoshev (1963–2010/2011), Uzbekistani Islamist
- Akrom Yusupov (1905-1975), Soviet, Uzbek artist

== See also ==
- Mohammad Akrom (born 2003), Indonesian footballer
