= Committee for Family and Women's Affairs of the Republic of Uzbekistan =

- O‘zbekiston Respublikasi Oila va xotin-qizlar qo‘mitasi
- Building of the Committee for Family and Women's Affairs of the Republic of Uzbekistan

Agency overview
- Formed: March 1, 2022
- Preceding agency: Women's Committee of Uzbekistan
- Jurisdiction: Government of Uzbekistan
- Headquarters: 1G Mirzakalon Ismoiliy Street, Tashkent
- Agency executive: Dilnozaxon Kattaxonova, Chairperson
- Parent agency: Cabinet of Ministers of Uzbekistan
- Website: gov.uz/en/wcu

The Committee for Family and Women's Affairs of the Republic of Uzbekistan is a republican executive authority responsible for implementing state policy on family and women's affairs in Uzbekistan. Its activities are aimed at developing the institution of the family, ensuring the rights and interests of women, supporting gender equality, and providing social protection for women. The Committee operates under the leadership of the Cabinet of Ministers of the Republic of Uzbekistan.

== History ==
On 27 December 1991, a conference of women of Uzbekistan was held in the city of Termez. At the conference, the public organization Women's Committee of Uzbekistan was established. The poet Halima Xudoyberdiyeva was elected as its head.

== Activities ==
The Committee operates in the following main areas:

- protecting the rights, freedoms and legitimate interests of women;
- implementing state policy aimed at ensuring gender equality;
- supporting the employment and entrepreneurship of women;
- providing social protection for families and women in need;
- strengthening family values;
- preventing family conflicts, divorces, and cases of coercion and violence within families;
- supporting women's education and the development of their professional skills;
- increasing women's participation in public life and state administration.

== Structure ==
The Committee's work is carried out through its central office, the Committee for Family and Women's Affairs of the Republic of Karakalpakstan, regional and Tashkent city territorial administrations, and district (city) departments.
