= Cabinet of Ministers (Uzbekistan) =

Cabinet of Ministers of Uzbekistan
- Özbekiston Respublikasi Vazirlar Mahkamasi
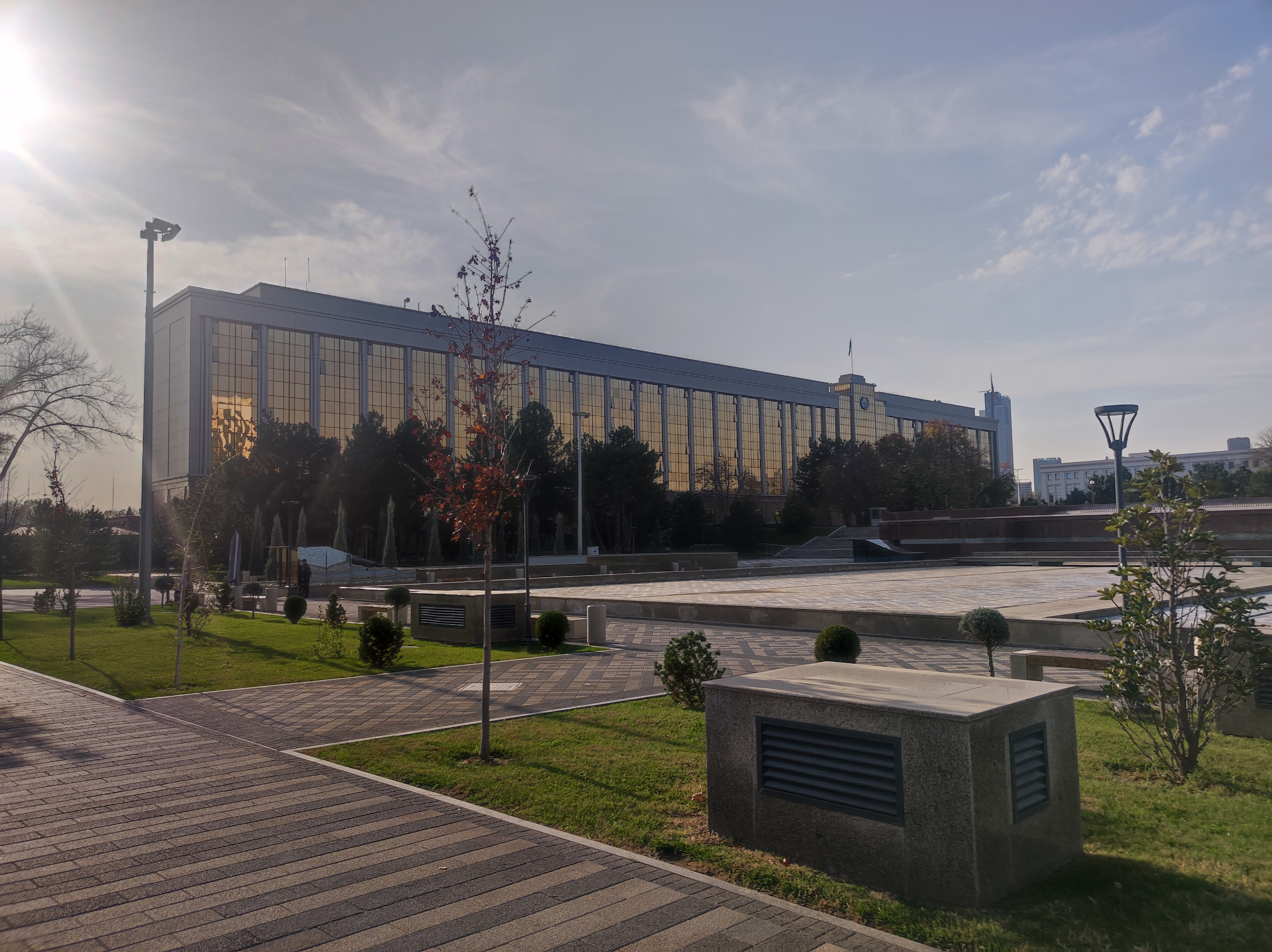
- Government headquarters in Tashkent

Overview
- Established: July 1991
- State: Uzbekistan
- Leader: Prime Minister
- Appointed by: President
- Responsible to: President
- Headquarters: House of the Government, 5 Mustaqillik Maydoni, Tashkent
- Website: gov.uz

Cabinet of Ministers of Uzbekistan (Uzbek: Özbekiston Respublikasi Vazirlar Mahkamasi) is the country's executive body, ensuring the effective functioning of the economy, social and spiritual spheres, and the implementation of laws, other decisions of the Oliy Majlis, and presidential decrees and orders. The Cabinet of Ministers operates on the basis of the Law "On the Cabinet of Ministers of the Republic of Uzbekistan" adopted on September 30, 2019 (latest version; the original version was adopted on August 29, 2003).

The Cabinet of Ministers heads the system of state administration bodies and the economic management bodies it creates, ensuring their coordinated activities. The Cabinet of Ministers is accountable to the President and the Oliy Majlis (the bicameral parliament) of Uzbekistan. Resolutions and orders of the Cabinet of Ministers are personally signed by the Prime Minister of Uzbekistan, as the head of government.

== History ==
The Cabinet of Ministers as Uzbekistan's executive branch of the government was created in 1992 following the dissolution of the Soviet Union and the adoption of the Constitution of Uzbekistan. On June 12, 2017, the President of Uzbekistan issued a decree reducing the number of deputy prime ministers by one.

On January 20, 2020, the government of Uzbekistan resigned before the new parliament.

In October 2026, President Mirziyoyev signed a decree combining the Ministries of Preschool and School Education and Higher Education, Science and Innovations into a single Ministry of Education and Science.

== Composition ==
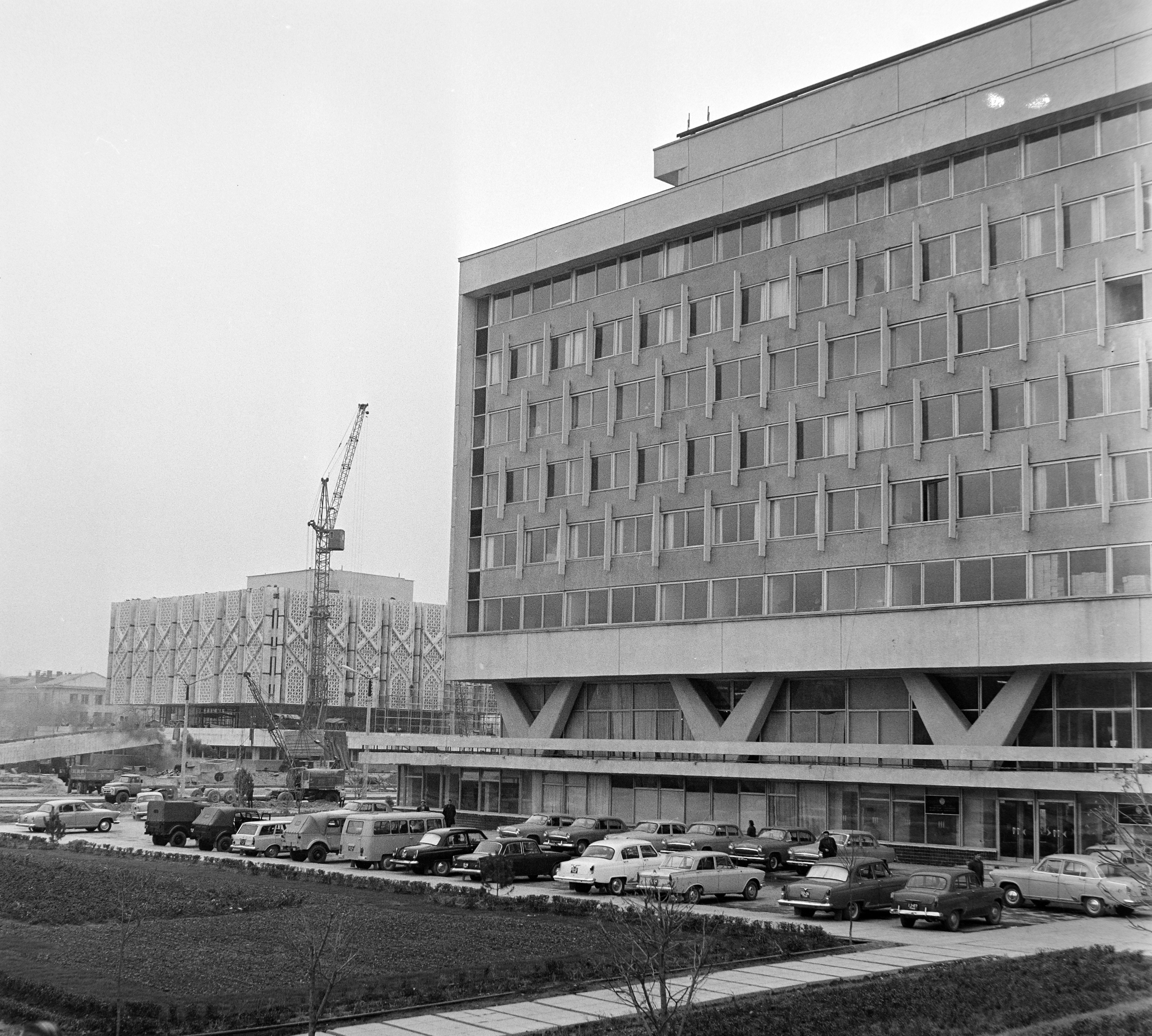
Government Building, 1952-1991

The Cabinet of Ministers consists of the Prime Minister of Uzbekistan, his deputies, ministers, and chairmen of state committees. The head of the government of the Republic of Karakalpakstan is part of the Cabinet of Ministers by virtue of his position. The composition of the Cabinet of Ministers is formed by the President of Uzbekistan. The candidate for the Prime Minister of Uzbekistan is considered and approved by the Chambers of the Oliy Majlis of Uzbekistan based on the presentation of the President of Uzbekistan. Members of the Cabinet of Ministers are approved by the President of Uzbekistan upon the submission of the Prime Minister of Uzbekistan.

== Responsibilities and power ==
=== Role of the Prime Minister ===
The Prime Minister of Uzbekistan organizes and directs the activities of the Cabinet of Ministers, is personally responsible for its effective operation, presides over meetings of the Cabinet of Ministers, and signs its decisions. The Cabinet of Ministers has the right of legislative initiative. The President of Uzbekistan has the right to make decisions on issues within the competence of the Cabinet of Ministers, preside over its meetings, cancel the decisions and orders of the Cabinet of Ministers and orders of the Prime Minister. The Cabinet of Ministers is responsible in its activities to the President of Uzbekistan and the Oliy Majlis. The Cabinet of Ministers assumes its powers in the same manner as the newly elected Oliy Majlis.

=== Procedure ===
The procedure for organizing the activities of the Cabinet of Ministers is defined in the Regulations of the Cabinet of Ministers approved by the decision of the Cabinet of Ministers of Uzbekistan No. 62 dated February 14, 2005. The work of the Cabinet of Ministers is carried out according to quarterly plans. At the meetings of the Cabinet of Ministers, the most important issues of state administration, economy and socio-cultural development are resolved. Meetings of the Cabinet of Ministers are held at least once every quarter of the year. The Presidium of the Cabinet, consisting of the Prime Minister and his deputies, functions as a permanent body of the Cabinet of Ministers. According to the Prime Minister's decision, other members of the Government of Uzbekistan may be included in the Cabinet of Ministers. Extraordinary meetings of the Cabinet of Ministers and its Presidium may be held when there is a need to discuss urgent issues. Every week, the Prime Minister of Uzbekistan holds councils with the participation of the Deputy Prime Minister, the Head of the Information and Analytical Department and the Head of the Apparatus, where the issues of organizing the execution of the tasks of the President of Uzbekistan, the daily activities of the government apparatus are discussed. Provisional commissions of the Cabinet of Ministers and other working bodies may be established to prepare proposals on some issues of state and economic management, develop draft decisions of the Cabinet of Ministers, as well as to carry out some tasks of the Cabinet of Ministers.

=== Responsibilities ===
The responsibilities of the Cabinet of Ministers are as follows:

- Takes measures to ensure sustainable economic growth, macroeconomic balance, reform, and structural transformation of the economy;
- Organizes the development and execution of the State Budget of the Republic of Uzbekistan and the budgets of state target funds, as well as the main areas of tax and budgetary policy, taking into account forecasts and the most important programs for the economic and social development of the Republic of Uzbekistan;
- Develops and ensures the implementation of programs for the development, technical and technological modernization, and diversification of priority sectors of the economy, as well as programs for the comprehensive socio-economic development of territories;
- Creates conditions for free enterprise, primarily through the development of private property, reducing the level of state presence in the economy to strategically and economically justified levels, and widespread privatization. Takes measures to eliminate all barriers and restrictions on the development of small and private entrepreneurship, create a favorable business climate and investment conditions, and demonopolize the economy;
- Promotes the implementation of measures to strengthen the monetary and credit system in the Republic of Uzbekistan and ensure the stability of banking and other financial institutions;
- Takes measures to develop market relations and introduce modern technologies in the agricultural sector, develop drainage and irrigation networks, preserve and improve the quality of land and rationally use water resources, and improve the agricultural management system;
- Improves public administration methods, including those based on e-government principles, and stimulates the introduction of modern principles and methods of economic and corporate management based on market principles;
- Develops proposals to improve the structure of public administration, and to establish, reorganize, and abolish ministries, state committees, departments, and other bodies of state and economic governance in the Republic of Uzbekistan;
- Ensures the development, improvement of the quality, and effectiveness of the education system, creates conditions for broad access to lifelong learning, and implements measures to advance priority areas for the development of science and technology;
- Implements measures to develop the healthcare system, improve the level of medical care, preserve and improve public health, implement healthy lifestyle principles, and ensure sanitary and epidemiological well-being;
- Promotes the development of culture, art, physical education, and sports, ensures broad access to cultural values, and enables citizens to participate fully in public and cultural life;
- Develops and implements programs to create jobs and ensure employment, ensures the functioning of social protection systems, social and pension provision for citizens, promotes the protection of families, motherhood, and childhood, and takes measures to implement state youth policy;
- Implements measures for the rational use of natural resources, conducts environmental protection measures, and implements major environmental programs of national and international significance, takes measures to eliminate the consequences of major accidents and disasters, as well as natural disasters;
- Facilitates the implementation of measures to ensure state security and defense, protect the state borders of the Republic of Uzbekistan, protect state interests, and maintain public order;

Ensures the representation of the Republic of Uzbekistan in foreign states and international organizations, concludes intergovernmental agreements, and takes measures to implement them;

- Manages foreign economic activity, scientific, technical, and cultural cooperation.

== Cabinet members ==
Cabinet of Ministers of Uzbekistan
Office	Name	Political party
Prime Minister	Abdulla Aripov	Liberal Democratic
First Deputy Prime Minister	Ochilboy Ramatov	
Deputy Prime Minister	Jamshid Kuchkarov	
Deputy Prime Minister	Jamshid Khodjayev	
Deputy Prime Minister	Dilnozaxon Kattaxonova	
Ministries
Minister for Agriculture Resources	Ibrokhim Abdurakhmonov	
Minister for Construction, Housing and Communal Services	Botir Zakirov	
Minister for Culture	Ozodbek Nazarbekov	National Revival Democratic
Minister for Defence	Lieutenant-General Shukhrat Kholmukhamedov	
Minister for Digital Technologies	Sherzod Shermatov	People's Democratic
Minister for Economy and Finance	Jamshid Qoʻchqorov	
Minister for Ecology, Environment Protection, Climate Change	Aziz Abduxakimov	Ecological
Minister for Emergency Situations	Azizbek Ikramov	
Minister for Education and Science	- (Hilola Umarova, Minister for Preschool and School Education; Kongratbay Sharipov, Minister for Higher Education, Science and Innovations)	(Liberal Democratic)
Ministry of Energy	Jurabek Mirzamahmudov	
Minister of Foreign Affairs	Bakhtiyor Saidov	
Minister for Health	Eldor Odilov	
Minister of Internal Affairs	Lieutenant General Aziz Tashpulatov	
Minister for Innovations, Industry and Trade	Laziz Kudratov	
Minister for Justice	Akbar Tashkulov	Justice Social Democratic
Minister for Mining Industry and Geology	Bobur Islomov	
Minister for Poverty Reduction and Employment	Botir Zohidov	
Minister for Sport	Adkham Ikramov	
Minister for Transport	Ilhom Maxkamov	
Minister for Water Resources	Shavkat Xamrayev	
Chairmen of State Committees
State Veterinary Committee	Bahrom Norqobilov	
National Committee for Ecology and Climate Change	Aziz Abduhakimov	
Tourism Committee	Umid Shodiev	
State Tax Committee	Sherzod Kudbiyev	
State Committee for Industrial Safety	Bakhtiyor Gulyamov	
State Committee for the Defense Industry	Oybek Ismailov	
State Committee for Forestry	Nizomiddin Bakirov	
Ex officio members
Council of Ministers of Karakalpakstan	Kakhraman Sariyev	

== Institutions under the Cabinet ==
- State Inspectorate for Control of Drinking Water Use
- State Inspectorate for Education Quality Control
- State Plant Quarantine Inspectorate
- State Inspectorate for Sanitary and Epidemiological Supervision
- "Ozarkhiv" agency
- Agency for Standardization, Metrology and Certification
- Capital Market Development Agency of Uzbekistan
- National Agency "Uzbekkino"
- Pharmaceutical Industry Development Agency
- State Asset Management Agency
- Presidential, Creative and Specialized Schools Development Agency
- Antimonopoly Committee
- Committee on Religious Affairs
- State Reserves Management Committee
- Committee on Interethnic Relations and Friendship with Foreign Countries
- Main Department of Hydrometeorology
- National Information and Analytical Center for Drug Control
- Knowledge and Skills Assessment Agency
- Center for the Study of Cultural Treasures of Uzbekistan Abroad
- Academy of Sciences of Uzbekistan
- Higher Attestation Commission
- Inspection for Control over the Agro-Industrial Complex
- Alcohol and Tobacco Market Regulation Inspectorate
- Youth Affairs Agency
