= Outline of Uzbekistan =

Landlocked country in Central Asia

The Flag of Uzbekistan

The Emblem of Uzbekistan

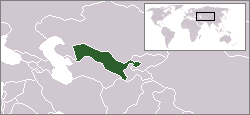
The location of Uzbekistan

An enlargeable map of Uzbekistan

The following outline is provided as an overview of and topical guide to Uzbekistan:

Uzbekistan – doubly landlocked sovereign country located in Central Asia. It borders Kazakhstan to the west and to the north, Kyrgyzstan and Tajikistan to the east, and Afghanistan and Turkmenistan to the south.

== General reference ==
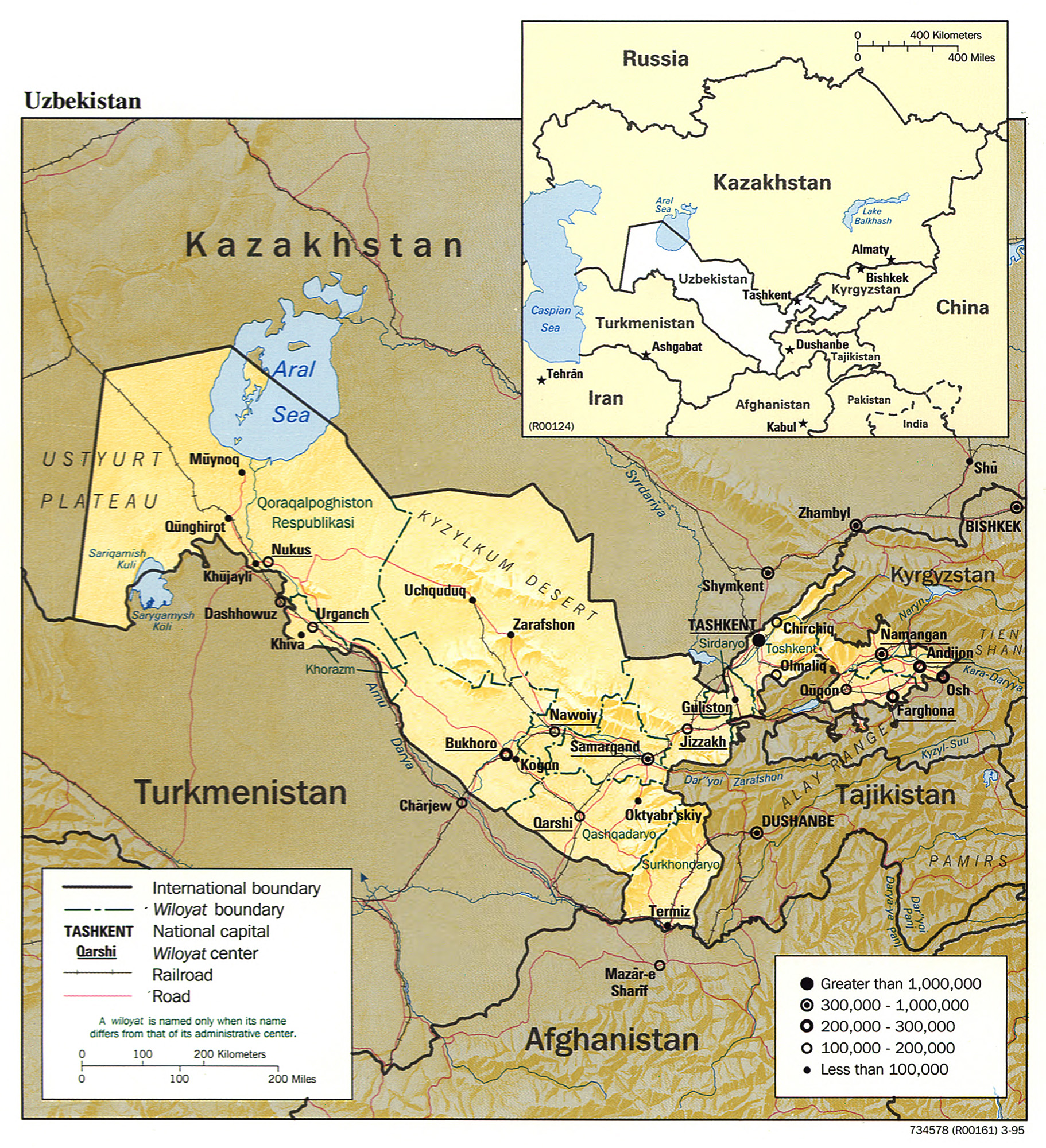
An enlargeable relief map of Uzbekistan

- Pronunciation:
- Common English country name: Uzbekistan
- Official English country name: The Republic of Uzbekistan
- Common endonym(s): O'zbekiston
- Official endonym(s): O‘zbekiston Respublikasi
- Adjectival(s): Uzbekistani, Uzbek
- Demonym(s): Uzbekistani, Uzbek
- International rankings of Uzbekistan
- ISO country codes: UZ, UZB, 860
- ISO region codes: See ISO 3166-2:UZ
- Internet country code top-level domain: .uz
- Currency: Uzbekistani sum, UZS

== Geography of Uzbekistan ==
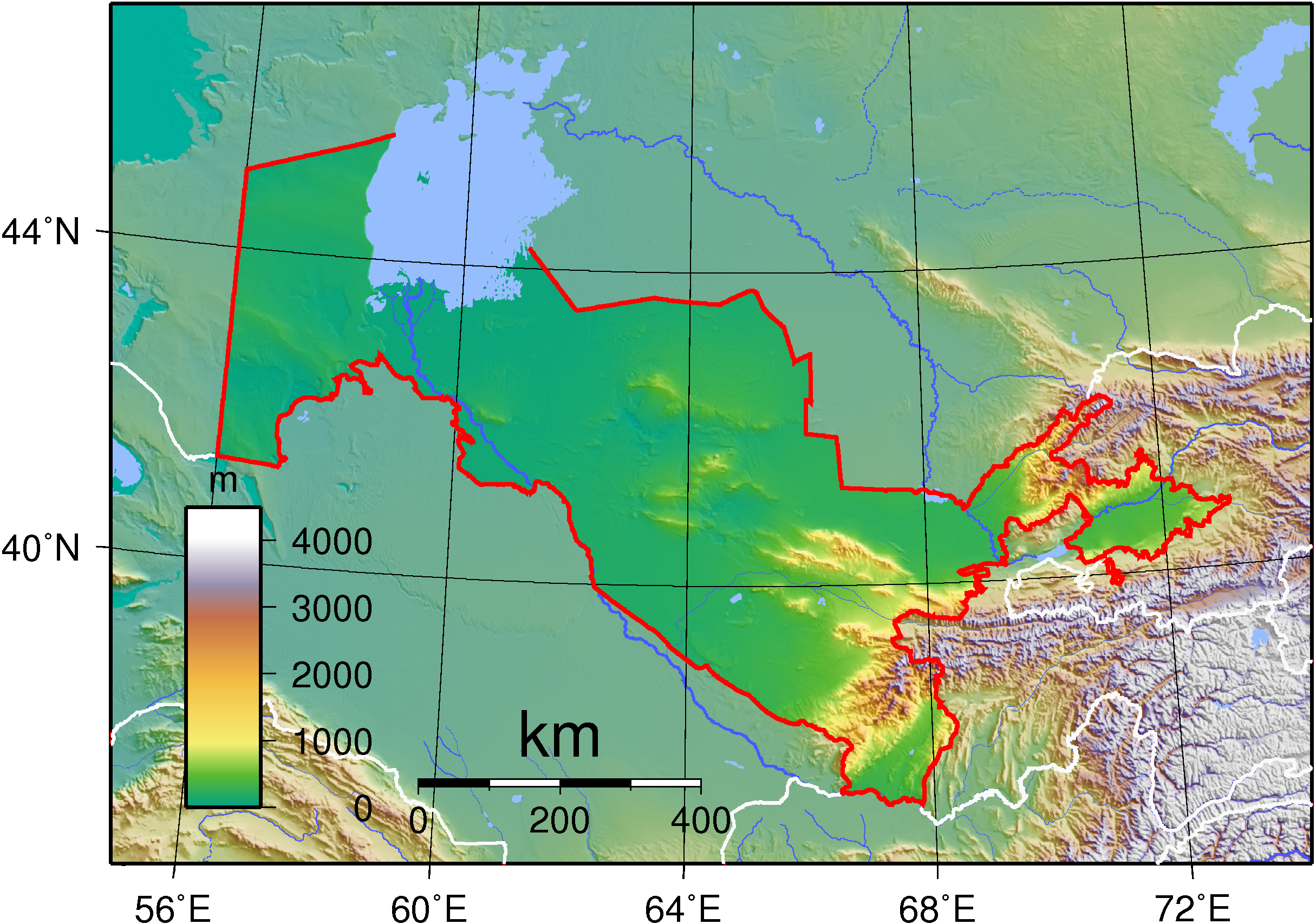
An enlargeable topographic map of Uzbekistan

- Uzbekistan is: a doubly landlocked country
- Location:
  - Northern Hemisphere and Eastern Hemisphere
  - Eurasia
    - Asia
      - Central Asia
  - Time zone: Uzbekistan Time (UTC+05)
  - Extreme points of Uzbekistan
    - High: Alpomish Peak 4,668 m (15,315 ft)
    - Low: Sariqamish Kuli −12 m (−39 ft)
  - Land boundaries: 6,221 km

Kazakhstan 2,203 km
Turkmenistan 1,621 km
Tajikistan 1,161 km
Kyrgyzstan 1,099 km
Afghanistan 137 km

- Coastline: none

- Population of Uzbekistan: 27,372,000 – 39th most populous country
- Area of Uzbekistan: 447,400 km^{2} – 56th in the world by area
- Atlas of Uzbekistan

=== Environment of Uzbekistan ===
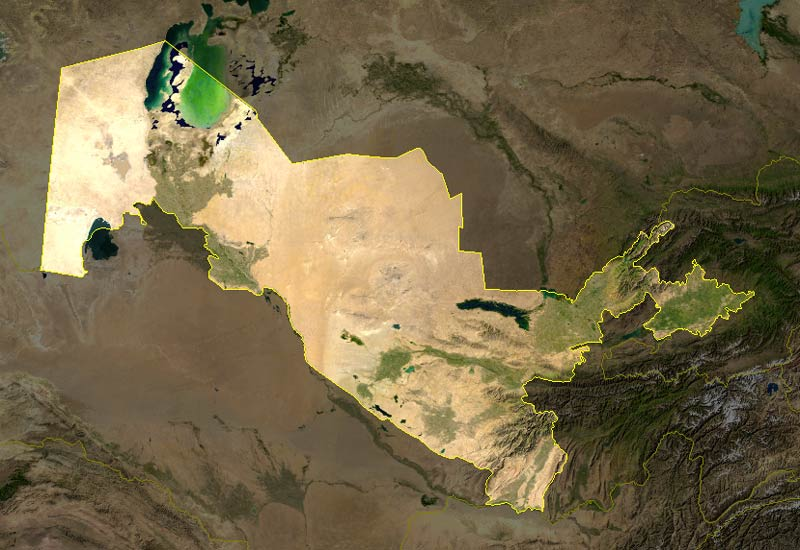
An enlargeable satellite image of Uzbekistan

- Climate of Uzbekistan
- Wildlife of Uzbekistan
  - Fauna of Uzbekistan
    - Birds of Uzbekistan
    - Mammals of Uzbekistan

==== Natural geographic features of Uzbekistan ====
- Glaciers of Uzbekistan: None
- Islands of Uzbekistan: None
- Lakes of Uzbekistan
- Mountains of Uzbekistan
  - Volcanoes in Uzbekistan: None
- Rivers of Uzbekistan
- List of World Heritage Sites in Uzbekistan

==== Ecoregions of Uzbekistan ====
List of ecoregions in Uzbekistan

==== Administrative divisions of Uzbekistan ====
Administrative divisions of Uzbekistan

- Regions of Uzbekistan
  - Districts of Uzbekistan

Regions of Uzbekistan

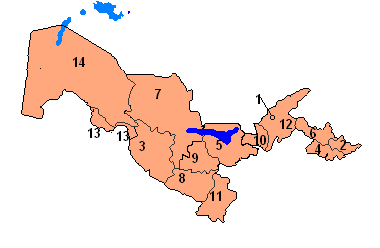
Political Map of Uzbekistan

| Key | Name | Capital city |
|---|---|---|
| 1 | Tashkent | — |
| 2 | Andijan Region | Andijan |
| 3 | Bukhara Region | Bukhara |
| 4 | Fergana Region | Fergana |
| 5 | Jizzakh Region | Jizzakh |
| 6 | Namangan Region | Namangan |
| 7 | Navoiy Region | Navoiy |
| 8 | Qashqadaryo Region | Qarshi |
| 9 | Samarqand Region | Samarkand |
| 10 | Sirdaryo Region | Guliston |
| 11 | Surxondaryo Region | Termez |
| 12 | Tashkent Region | Nurafshon |
| 13 | Xorazm Region | Urgench |
| 14 | Republic of Karakalpakstan | Nukus |

=== Demography of Uzbekistan ===
Demographics of Uzbekistan

== Government and politics of Uzbekistan ==
- Form of government: Presidential republic
- Capital of Uzbekistan: Tashkent
- Elections in Uzbekistan
- Political parties in Uzbekistan

=== Branches of the government of Uzbekistan ===
Government of Uzbekistan

==== Executive branch of the government of Uzbekistan ====
- Head of state: President of Uzbekistan,Shavkat Mirziyoyev
- Head of government: Prime Minister of Uzbekistan, Abdulla Aripov
- Cabinet of Uzbekistan

==== Legislative branch of the government of Uzbekistan ====
- Parliament of Uzbekistan (bicameral)
  - Upper house: Senate of Uzbekistan
  - Lower house: Legislative Chamber of Uzbekistan

==== Judicial branch of the government of Uzbekistan ====
Court system of Uzbekistan

- Supreme Court of Uzbekistan

=== Foreign relations of Uzbekistan ===
- Diplomatic missions in Uzbekistan
- Diplomatic missions of Uzbekistan

==== International organization membership ====
The Republic of Uzbekistan is a member of:

- Asian Development Bank (ADB)
- Collective Security Treaty Organization (CSTO)
- Commonwealth of Independent States (CIS)
- Economic Cooperation Organization (ECO)
- Eurasian Economic Community (EAEC)
- Euro-Atlantic Partnership Council (EAPC)
- European Bank for Reconstruction and Development (EBRD)
- Food and Agriculture Organization (FAO)
- General Confederation of Trade Unions (GCTU)
- International Atomic Energy Agency (IAEA)
- International Bank for Reconstruction and Development (IBRD)
- International Civil Aviation Organization (ICAO)
- International Criminal Court (ICCt) (signatory)
- International Criminal Police Organization (Interpol)
- International Development Association (IDA)
- International Federation of Red Cross and Red Crescent Societies (IFRCS)
- International Finance Corporation (IFC)
- International Labour Organization (ILO)
- International Monetary Fund (IMF)
- International Olympic Committee (IOC)
- International Organization for Standardization (ISO)
- International Red Cross and Red Crescent Movement (ICRM)
- International Telecommunication Union (ITU)
- International Telecommunications Satellite Organization (ITSO)
- Islamic Development Bank (IDB)
- Multilateral Investment Guarantee Agency (MIGA)
- Nonaligned Movement (NAM)
- Organisation of Islamic Cooperation (OIC)
- Organization for Security and Cooperation in Europe (OSCE)
- Organisation for the Prohibition of Chemical Weapons (OPCW)
- Partnership for Peace (PFP)
- Shanghai Cooperation Organisation (SCO)
- United Nations (UN)
- United Nations Conference on Trade and Development (UNCTAD)
- United Nations Educational, Scientific, and Cultural Organization (UNESCO)
- United Nations Industrial Development Organization (UNIDO)
- Universal Postal Union (UPU)
- World Customs Organization (WCO)
- World Federation of Trade Unions (WFTU)
- World Health Organization (WHO)
- World Intellectual Property Organization (WIPO)
- World Meteorological Organization (WMO)
- World Tourism Organization (UNWTO)
- World Trade Organization (WTO) (observer)

=== Law and order in Uzbekistan ===
- Constitution of Uzbekistan
- Human rights in Uzbekistan
  - LGBT rights in Uzbekistan
  - Freedom of religion in Uzbekistan
- Law enforcement in Uzbekistan

=== Military of Uzbekistan ===
Military of Uzbekistan

- Command
  - Commander-in-chief:
    - Ministry of Defence of Uzbekistan
- Forces
  - Army of Uzbekistan
  - Air Force of Uzbekistan
  - Border Troops of Uzbekistan
- Military history of Uzbekistan

== History of Uzbekistan ==
- Timeline of the history of Uzbekistan
- Current events of Uzbekistan
- Military history of Uzbekistan

== Culture of Uzbekistan ==
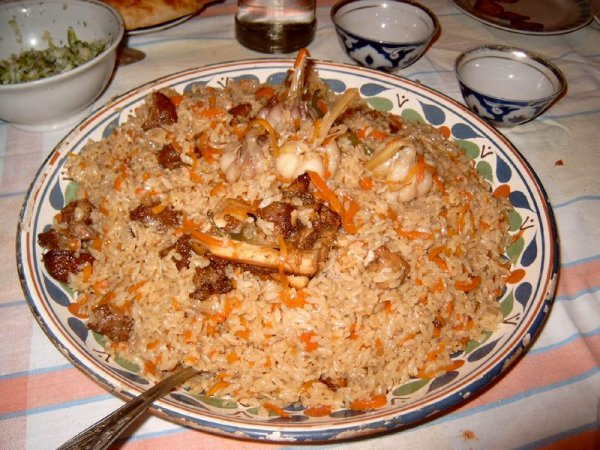
Palov, the national dish in Uzbekistan

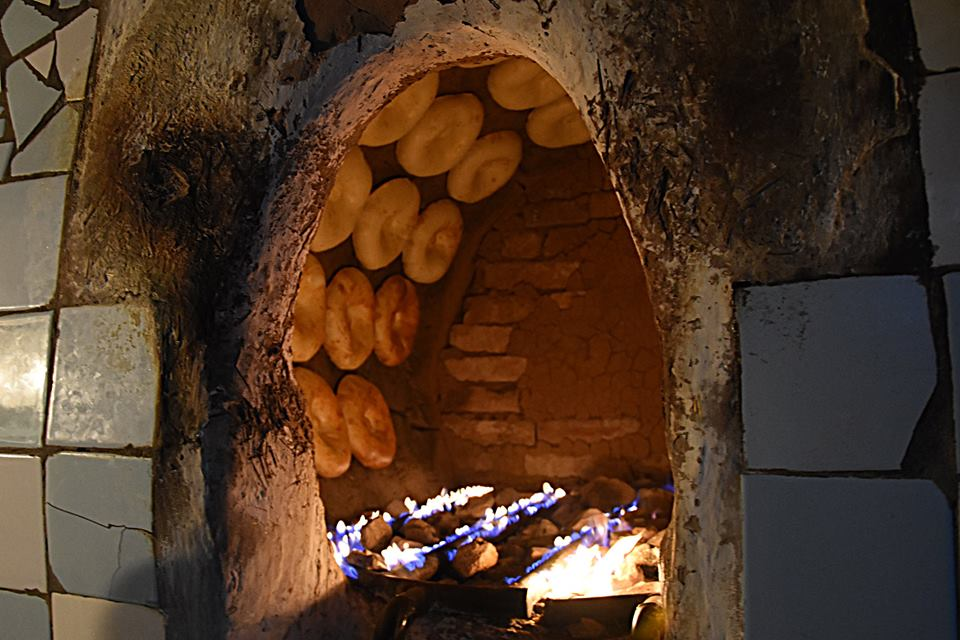
A traditional tandyr oven being used to bake flatbread

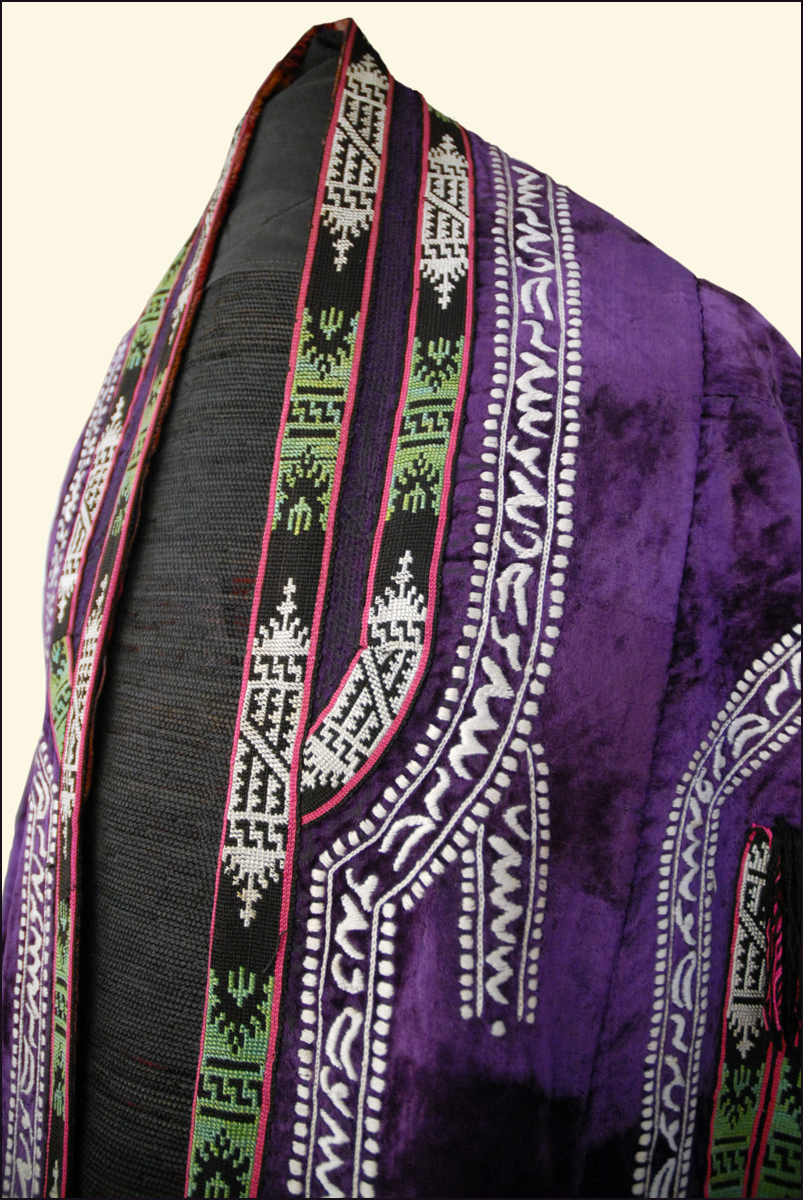
A parandja, a robe worn by women until it was banned in 1927. This example is made of velvet, silk threads, and handmade embroidery. Displayed at the Museum of Applied Arts in Tashkent
- Architecture of Uzbekistan
- Cuisine of Uzbekistan
  - List of Uzbek dishes
- Languages of Uzbekistan
- Media in Uzbekistan
- National symbols of Uzbekistan
  - Coat of arms of Uzbekistan
  - Flag of Uzbekistan
  - National anthem of Uzbekistan
- People of Uzbekistan
- Prostitution in Uzbekistan
- Public holidays in Uzbekistan
- Religion in Uzbekistan
  - Buddhism in Uzbekistan
  - Christianity in Uzbekistan
  - Islam in Uzbekistan
  - Judaism in Uzbekistan
- List of World Heritage Sites in Uzbekistan

=== Art in Uzbekistan ===
- Cinema of Uzbekistan
- Music of Uzbekistan

=== Sports in Uzbekistan ===
Sports in Uzbekistan

- Football in Uzbekistan
- Uzbekistan at the Olympics

== Economy and infrastructure of Uzbekistan ==
- Economic rank, by nominal GDP (2007): 87th (eighty-seventh)
- Agriculture in Uzbekistan
- Banking in Uzbekistan
  - National Bank of Uzbekistan
- Communications in Uzbekistan
  - Internet in Uzbekistan
- Companies of Uzbekistan
- Currency of Uzbekistan: Soum
  - ISO 4217: UZS
- Energy in Uzbekistan
  - Energy policy of Uzbekistan
  - Oil industry in Uzbekistan
- Mining in Uzbekistan
- Uzbekistan Stock Exchange
- Tourism in Uzbekistan
- Transportation in Uzbekistan
  - Airports in Uzbekistan
  - Rail transport in Uzbekistan

== Education in Uzbekistan ==
Education in Uzbekistan

== Health in Uzbekistan ==
Health in Uzbekistan

== See also ==
- Uzbekistan
- List of international rankings
- List of Uzbekistan-related topics
- Member state of the United Nations
- Outline of Asia
- Outline of geography
