= Ministry of Justice (Uzbekistan) =

Government ministry of Uzbekistan

Ministry of Justice of the Republic of Uzbekistan
- O'zbekiston Respublikasi Adliya vazirligi
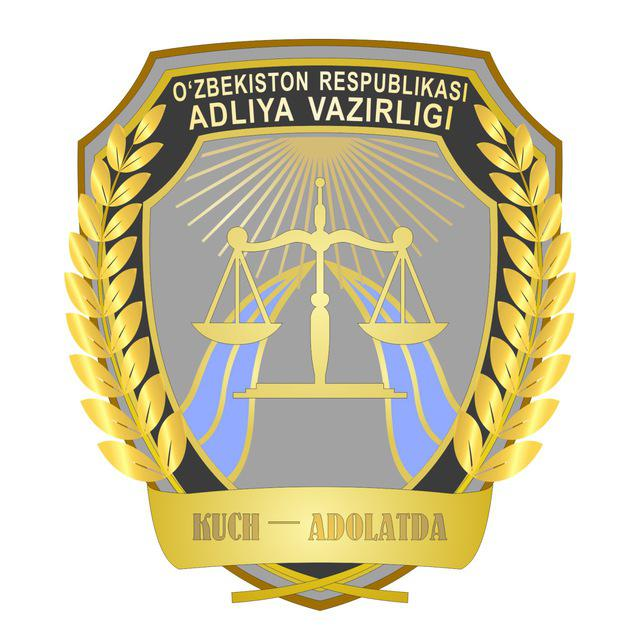
- The official emblem of the Ministry of Justice of the Republic of Uzbekistan

Agency overview
- Formed: September 28, 1990
- Jurisdiction: Government of Uzbekistan
- Headquarters: 5 Saylgokh St Tashkent, Uzbekistan
- Minister responsible: Akbar Tashkulov, Minister of Justice
- Website: www.minjust.uz

The Ministry of Justice of the Republic of Uzbekistan (Uzbek: O'zbekiston Respublikasi Adliya vazirligi) is the central government body responsible for ensuring the consistent implementation of a unified state policy in the areas of lawmaking and law enforcement in Uzbekistan.

== History ==
The Ministry of Justice was tasked with organizational leadership of the Supreme Court of the Karakalpakstan Autonomous Republic, regional courts, Tashkent city courts, and district (city) people's courts. Its responsibilities included organizing and preparing proposals for the codification of legislation in the Uzbek SSR, providing methodological guidance for legal work in the national economy, and coordinating public bodies and organizations to promote legal knowledge and clarify the law for the population. Additionally, it oversaw notaries, the Tashkent Research Institute of Forensics, and the general management of civil status bodies and the legal profession in the Uzbek SSR. On September 9, 2020, the Ministry of Justice of the Republic of Uzbekistan became the first government body in Uzbekistan that complied with the international standard ISO 37001:2016 "Anti-corruption Management System" in all areas of activity, and therefore, was added to the international rating and received a certificate.

== List of ministers (1970-present) ==
- Mamlakat Vasikova (1970-1984)
- Naman Burikhodzhaev (1984-1985)
- Bakhodir Alimjanov (1985-1990)
- Muhamed-Babir Malikov (1991-1993)
- Alisher Mardiev (1993-1995)
- Sirojiddin Mirsafoev (1995-2000)
- Abdusamat Polvon-Zoda (2000-2005)
- Buritosh Mustafaev (2005-2006)
- Foziljon Otakhonov (2006-2007)
- Ravshan Mukhitdinov (2007-2011)
- Nigmatilla Yuldashev (2011-2015)
- Muzrob Ikromov (2015-2017)
- Ruslanbek Davletov (2017–2022)
- Akbar Tashkulov (2022–present)

== Current Administration ==
Position	Name
Minister of Justice of the Republic of Uzbekistan	Akbar Tashkulov
Deputy Minister of Justice of the Republic of Uzbekistan	Alisher Karimov
Deputy Minister of Justice of the Republic of Uzbekistan	Muzraf Ikramov
Deputy Minister of Justice of the Republic of Uzbekistan	Hudayor Meliev
Deputy Minister of Justice of the Republic of Uzbekistan	Sherzad Rabiev

== See also ==
- Justice ministry
- Politics of Uzbekistan
