= 2025 in Uzbekistan =

Coordinates: 42°N 63°E

- Decades: 2000s; 2010s; 2020s
- See also: Other events of 2025; Timeline of Uzbek history

Individuals and events related to Uzbekistan in 2025.

== Incumbents ==
Post	Photo	Name
President of Uzbekistan		Shavkat Mirziyoyev
Prime Minister of Uzbekistan		Abdulla Aripov

== Events ==
=== January ===
- 24 January – The Oliy Majlis passes a law banning e-cigarettes nationwide.

=== March ===
- 13 March – Uzbekistan signs a $5 million mineral deal with France to develop its geological sector.
- 31 March – Uzbekistan, Kyrgyzstan and Tajikistan sign an agreement fixing their common border's tripoint.

=== April ===
- 3–4 April – The first European Union–Central Asia summit is held in Samarkand.

=== June ===
- 5 June – Uzbekistan qualifies for its first FIFA World Cup after drawing 0-0 with the United Arab Emirates at the 2026 FIFA World Cup qualification in Abu Dhabi.
- 24 June – Saida Mirziyoyeva, daughter of President Shavkat Mirziyoyev, is appointed chief of staff of the presidential administration following the post’s reestablishment by presidential decree.

=== July ===
- 1 July – Azerbaijan, Kazakhstan, and Uzbekistan sign an agreement to establish the Green Corridor Union, a joint venture to promote regional green energy cooperation.
- 17 July – Uzbekistan, Pakistan, and Afghanistan sign a tripartite framework agreement in Kabul to conduct a feasibility study for the Trans-Afghan railway project.

=== September ===
- 2 September – Uzbekistan sends a diplomatic note to Russia in protest over a video of an Uzbek taxi driver being subjected to verbal abuse while working outside Moscow.
- 24 September – Former Afghan MP Abbas Ibrahim Zada is arrested in Tashkent following multiple business-related complaints.

== Holidays ==
- 1 January – New Year's Day
- 14 January – Day of Defenders of the Native land
- 8 March – International Women's Day
- 21 March – Nowruz
- 30 March – Eid al-Fitr
- 9 May – Day of Memory and Honour
- 6 June – Eid al-Adha
- 1 September – Independence Day
- 1 October – Teachers' Day
- 8 December – Constitution Day

== Deaths ==
- 12 October – Rustam Akhmedov, 81, first minister of defense of Uzbekistan (1991–1997)
- 30 October – Yoqub Ahmedov, 87, Uzbek actor (The Mischievous Boy, Adventures of Ali-Baba and the Forty Thieves, The Battle of the Three Kings).

== Art and entertainment ==
- List of Uzbekistani submissions for the Academy Award for Best International Feature Film

== See also ==
- Outline of Uzbekistan
- List of Uzbekistan-related topics
- History of Uzbekistan
