= Rim Giniyatullin =

Uzbek politician (1943–2026)

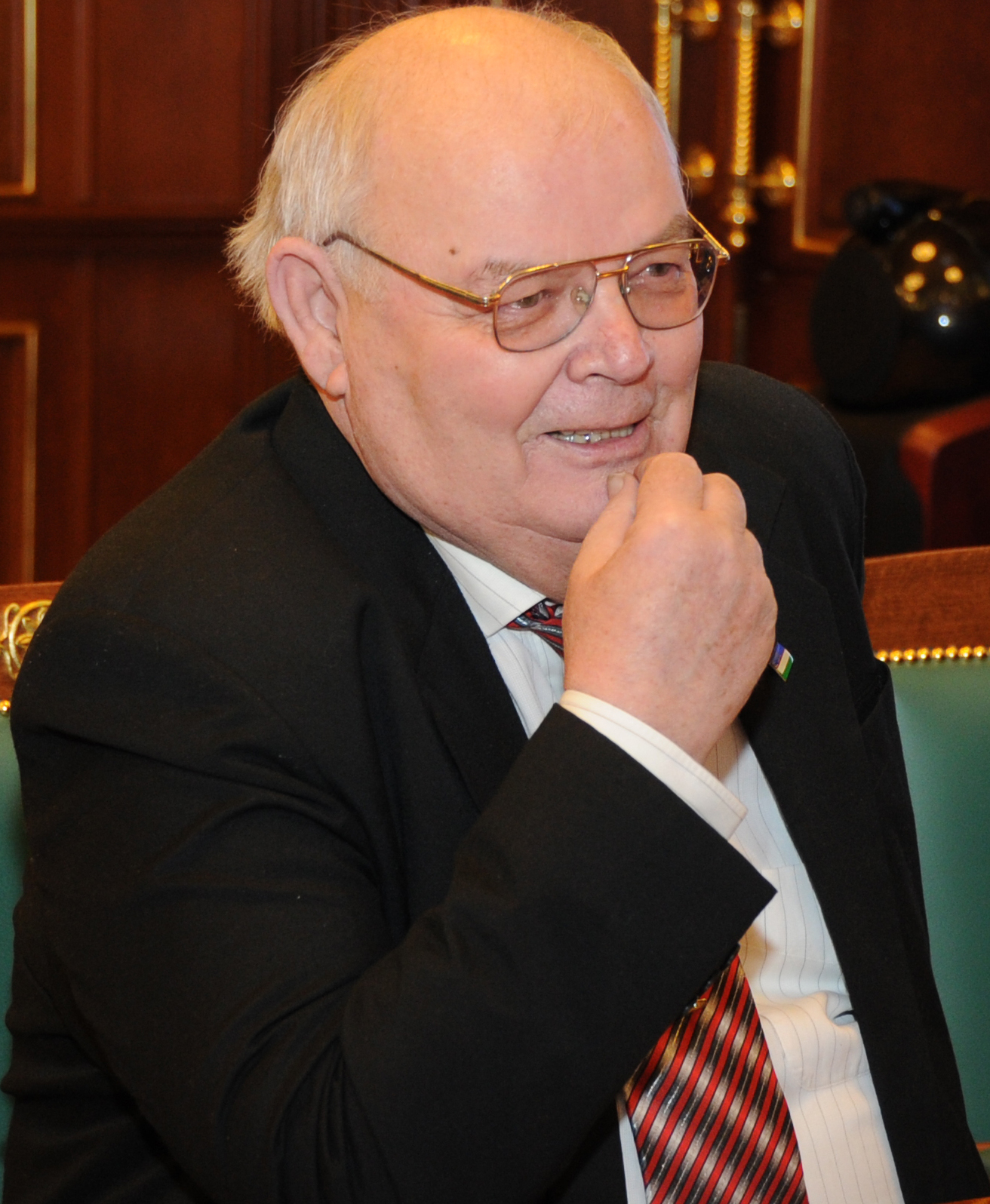
- Giniyatullin in 2012

Minister of Land Reclamation and Water Management
- In office 1989–1996
- Preceded by: Position established
- Succeeded by: Nosirjon Yusupov (as Minister of Agriculture and Water Resources)

Personal details
- Born: 18 September 1943 Dashtobod, Uzbek SSR, Soviet Union
- Died: 20 April 2026 (aged 82)
- Education: Tashkent Institute of Irrigation and Melioration
- Occupation: Engineer

Rim Abdulovich Giniyatullin (18 September 1943 – 20 April 2026) was an Uzbek politician. He served as Minister of Land Reclamation and Water Management from 1989 to 1996.

Giniyatullin died on 20 April 2026, at the age of 82.
