= Hakim Zaripov =

Uzbek-Soviet actor (1924–2023)

- Born: Hakim Karimovich Zaripov; September 17, 1924 (age 101); Tashkent, Turkestan ASSR, Soviet Union
- Died: January 18, 2023 (aged 98); Tashkent, Uzbekistan
- Occupation: artist
- Awards: "Oʻzbekiston SSRda xizmat koʻrsatgan artist"(Honored artist of the Uzbekistan SSR); "Oʻzbekiston SSR xalq artisti" (People's Artist of the Uzbek SSR); "SSR xalq artisti" (People's Artist of the USSR)

Hakim Karimovich Zaripov (Uzbek: Hakim Karimovich Zaripov; September 17, 1924 – January 18, 2023) was an Uzbek and Soviet circus artist, and a horse trainer. He was awarded the title of People's Artist of the USSR in 1980. Until his death, he held the distinction of being the oldest living People's Artist of the USSR.

== Biography ==
Hakim Zaripov was born on September 17, 1924, in Tashkent, in the family of Karim Zaripov, a circus artist. In 1938, under the leadership of his father Karim Zaripov, he began his circus activities as a tightrope walker in the "Uzbekistan Tightrope Walkers" ensemble. He led this ensemble from 1952 to 2006. With this ensemble, he traveled on service trips to various cities and foreign countries, including Bulgaria, Poland, Czechoslovakia, Germany, Romania, Mongolia, Hungary, and Finland.

He completed his education at the Tashkent School of Music named after Glier (later the Republic Special Music Academic Lyceum named after Glier) and subsequently at the Tashkent Conservatory (now the Uzbekistan State Conservatory), where he completed the conducting faculty (symphonic department). He was actively involved in the activities of circus groups, and programs, and served as the artistic director of various circuses. Additionally, he was recognized as the author of new circus construction projects. In 1952, he became the editor-in-chief of the newspaper "Uzbekiston Zhigitlari". He trained many circus artists, reorganized the "Uzbekistan Tightrope Walkers" ensemble, and taught his students the art of tightrope walking and the secrets of the circus. Throughout this time, he shared his knowledge with numerous circus artists and acted as a mentor.

Zaripov died on January 18, 2023, at the age of 99.

== Family ==
- His father was Karim Zaripov (1883–1960).
- His mother was Muborak Zaripova (1906–1992).
- His spouse was Nina Dimitriyevna Zaripova (1924–2018).
- His daughter is Gavhar Zaripova (born in 1949).
- His son is Anvar Zaripov (born in 1956)

== Awards ==
- "Oʻzbekiston SSRda xizmat koʻrsatgan artist" (1954) (Honored artist of the Uzbekistan SSR)
- "Oʻzbekiston SSR xalq artisti" (1964) (People's Artist of the Uzbek SSR)
- "SSR xalq artisti" (1980) (People's Artist of the USSR)

== Acting work ==
- In 1955 – "Nesterka" – epizod
- In 1956 – "Dohunda" – epizod
- In 1957 – "Choʻldagi voqea"
- In 1961 – "Muhabbat haqida qissa" – episode
- In 1967 – "Sovet sirki amerikalik Diana Shoor bilan"
- In 1978 – "Jigits Zaripovlar"
- In 1979 – "Havo piyodalari"
- "Tirik Afsona va Nurota qadamjolari" (Documentary film)

== See also ==
- Akrom Yusupov
