= Ministry of Employment and Poverty Reduction (Uzbekistan) =

Government ministry of Uzbekistan

Ministry of Employment and Poverty Reduction of the Republic of Uzbekistan
- O‘zbekiston Respublikasi Kambag‘allikni Qisqartirish va Bandlik Vazirligi

Employment and Poverty Reduction Ministry overview
- Jurisdiction: Government of Uzbekistan
- Headquarters: Tashkent
- Minister responsible: Botir Zohidov, Minister of Employment and Poverty Reduction
- Website: gov.uz/oz/bv

The Ministry of Employment and Poverty Reduction of the Republic of Uzbekistan (Uzbek: O‘zbekiston Respublikasi Kambag‘allikni Qisqartirish va Bandlik Vazirligi) is the administrative body of the Government of Uzbekistan which is responsible for implementing state policies with respect to employment, labor migration and labor relations. It reports to the Cabinet of Ministers of the Republic of Uzbekistan.

== History ==
On October 10, 1991, the State Committee of the Uzbek SSR for Labor and Social Issues was transformed into the Ministry of Labor. In 1992, Uzbekistan was admitted to the International Labour Organization. On July 14, 1993, the Republican Agency for Labor Migrants was established. On February 13, 2001, the Ministry of Labor and the Ministry of Social Security were merged, and on its basis the Ministry of Labor and Social Protection was established. The main tasks of the ministry were to develop measures for social protection of the population and monitor their implementation, pursue a unified state policy in the field of labor remuneration, implement social support for the unemployed and their family members, and establish and develop relations with the International Labor Organization and labor bodies of other countries on the use of labor force in the development of the republic. On April 6, 2001, the Republican Agency for Labor Migrants was transformed into the Agency for External Labor Migration Issue.

On 24 May 2017, the Ministry of Labor and Social Protection was transformed into the Ministry of Employment and Labor Relations. On November 27, 2018, Uzbekistan became a member of the International Organization for Migration.

On December 21, 2022, the Ministry of Employment and Labor Relations was reorganized into the Ministry of Poverty Reduction and Employment.

== Ministers ==
Ministers from 1991 to the present:

- Alikhan Atajanov (1991-1995)
- Akiljon Obidov (1995-1999)
- Shavkatbek Ibragimov (1999-2001)
- Aqiljon Obidov (2001-2006)
- Oktam Haitov (2006-2014)
- Aziz Abdukhakimov (2014-2017)
- Oktam Haitov (2017-2018)
- Sherzod Kudbiyev (2018-2019)
- Nozim Khusanov (September 12, 2019-September 23, 2024)
- Botir Zohidov (since September 23, 2024)
