= 2024 in Uzbekistan =

Coordinates: 42°N 63°E

- Decades: 2000s; 2010s; 2020s
- See also: Other events of 2024; Timeline of Uzbek history

Individuals and events related to Uzbekistan in 2024.

== Incumbents ==
Post	Photo	Name
President of Uzbekistan		Shavkat Mirziyoyev
Prime Minister of Uzbekistan		Abdulla Aripov

== Events ==
- 27 May – Russia and Uzbekistan sign an agreement for Rosatom to build a nuclear power plant in the latter country.
- 14 September – 6 October – 2024 FIFA Futsal World Cup
- October – Archaeologists announce the discovery of the Silk Road-era cities of Tugunbulak and Tashbulak.
- 27 October – 2024 Uzbek parliamentary election

== Holidays ==
- 1 January - New Year's Day
- 14 January – Day of Defenders of the Native land
- 8 March - International Women's Day
- 21 March - Nowruz
- 10 April – Eid al-Fitr
- 9 May - Day of Memory and Honour
- 16 June – Eid al-Adha
- 1 September – Independence Day
- 1 October – Teachers' Day
- 8 December – Constitution Day

== Art and entertainment ==
- List of Uzbekistani submissions for the Academy Award for Best International Feature Film

== Deaths ==
- 22 January – Turgʻun Azizov, 89, actor (Maftuningman, Fiery Roads).
- 7 February – Abror Tursunov, Uzbek actor (Suyunchi, Abdullajon).
- 23 October – Shamshad Abdullaev, 66, poet and writer.

== See also ==
- Uzbekistan at the 2024 Summer Olympics
- Outline of Uzbekistan
- List of Uzbekistan-related topics
- History of Uzbekistan
