= National symbols of Uzbekistan =

Symbol	Name	Image	Ref.
National flag	Flag of Uzbekistan		
National emblem	Emblem of Uzbekistan		
National anthem	State Anthem of Uzbekistan		
Father of the Nation	Emir Timur		
National animal	Sand cat		
National bird	Huma Bird		
National dog	Central Asian Shepherd Dog		
National flower	Tulip		
National tree	Chinar		
National fruit	Pomegranate		
National sport	Kurash		
National dance	Lazgi		
National instrument	Dutar and doyra		
National poet	Alisher Navai		
National dish	Osh palov		
