= 2025 European Union–Central Asia summit =

2025 EU–Central Asia summit

- Host country: Uzbekistan
- Date: 3–4 April 2025
- Participants: European Union, Central Asian states

Key points
- New EU–Central Asia Strategic Partnership adopted, US$13.2 billion EU investment package, calls for human rights progress

The 2025 European Union–Central Asia summit was a summit held on 3–4 April 2025 in Samarkand, Uzbekistan. It was the first summit meeting between the European Union and the Central Asian nations of Kazakhstan, Kyrgyzstan, Tajikistan, Turkmenistan and Uzbekistan. The summit increased cooperation in areas of shared interest such as economic development, human rights, and political repression in Central Asia.

== Participants ==
- Serdar Berdimuhamedow (Turkmen: Serdar Berdimuhamedow) (Turkmenistan, President)
- António Costa (Portuguese: António Luís Santos da Costa) – (European Council, President)
- Sadyr Japarov (Kyrgyz: Садыр Жапаров) (Kyrgyzstan, President)
- Shavkat Mirziyoyev (Uzbek: Shavkat Miromonovich Mirziyoyev) (Uzbekistan, President)
- Ursula von der Leyen (German: Ursula von der Leyen) – (European Commission, President)
- Emomali Rahmon (Tajik: Эмомалӣ Раҳмон) (Tajikistan, President)
- Odile Renaud-Basso (French: Odile Renaud-Basso) – (European Bank for Reconstruction and Development, President)
- Kassym-Jomart Tokayev (Kazakh: Қасым-Жомарт Тоқаев) (Kazakhstan, President)

The event was hosted by Uzbek President Shavkat Mirziyoyev on 3–4 April 2025 in Samarkand, Uzbekistan.

== Outcomes ==
The summit ended with the launch of the EU–Central Asia Strategic Partnership, a plan for political and economic cooperation. The European Union pledged $13.2 billion to support infrastructure development, green energy, and technology projects designed to promote regional growth. The European Union urged Central Asian countries to improve political freedoms, human rights, and judicial fairness.

The summit showed some tensions among Turkic states over Northern Cyprus because the Central Asian countries established diplomatic relations with Cyprus and Turkey was against it.

European leaders called the summit the beginning of a new phase of cooperation between Europe and Central Asia. Central Asian leaders welcomed closer ties, and opportunities for cultural exchanges as well as new investment and growth.

== See also ==
- Foreign relations of the European Union
- Human rights in Central Asia
- Organization of Turkic States
