= Mirakbar Rahmonqulov =

Uzbek statesman and legal scholar (1952–2026)

- Mirakbar Hojiakbarovich Rahmonqulov

Member of the Senate of Uzbekistan
- In office January 2015 – 11 February 2026
- Appointed by: Islam Karimov and Shavkat Mirziyoyev

Personal details
- Born: 5 October 1952 Tashkent, Uzbek SSR, Soviet Union
- Died: 11 February 2026 (aged 73) Tashkent, Uzbekistan
- Education: Tashkent State University
- Occupation: Statesman, jurist, legal scholar
- Profession: Law
- Awards: Order of Fidokorona Xizmatlari Uchun; Order of Shon-Sharaf, 2nd Class; Honoured Lawyer of Uzbekistan

Mirakbar Hojiakbarovich Rahmonqulov (Uzbek: Mirakbar Hojiakbarovich Rahmonqulov; also rendered in English-language Uzbek sources as Mir-Akbar Rakhmankulov or Mir-Akbar Rakhmonkulov; 5 October 1952 – 11 February 2026) was an Uzbekistani statesman, jurist and legal scholar. He held the degree of Doctor of Law and the academic title of professor.

Rahmonqulov served as a State Adviser to the President of Uzbekistan, secretary and first deputy secretary of the National Security Council, director of the Institute for Strategic and Regional Studies and director of the Institute of Legislation and Legal Policy under the President of Uzbekistan. He was appointed to the Senate of Uzbekistan in 2015 and reappointed in 2020 and 2024.

At the time of his death, he was director of the Institute of Legislation and Legal Policy, a senator, and deputy chairman of the Senate Committee on Judicial and Legal Issues and Anti-Corruption.

== Early life and education ==
Rahmonqulov was born on 5 October 1952 in Tashkent, then part of the Uzbek Soviet Socialist Republic. In 1975, he graduated in law from Tashkent State University, now the National University of Uzbekistan. He later undertook postgraduate studies at the Sverdlovsk Law Institute. His areas of specialisation included civil law and constitutional law.

He began his professional career as a junior researcher at the Research Institute of Economics under the State Planning Committee of the Uzbek SSR. He subsequently held positions in the Central Committee of the Uzbek youth organisation, the Academy of Sciences of the Uzbek SSR and the Presidium of the Supreme Soviet of the Uzbek SSR.

== Academic and government career ==
From 1992 to 1994, Rahmonqulov served as first vice-rector of the University of World Economy and Diplomacy. In that position, he participated in the development of professional education in international relations, foreign policy and law.

He later worked in the Presidential Administration and headed the Institute for Strategic and Regional Studies under the President of Uzbekistan. A government resolution issued in June 1995 identified him as director of the institute.

Rahmonqulov subsequently held senior positions in the National Security Council under the President of Uzbekistan. An official act adopted in 2000 listed him as secretary of the Security Council.

Official documents from 2003, 2005 and 2007 identified him as first deputy secretary of the National Security Council.

He also served as a State Adviser to the President. His work covered national and regional security, state administration, domestic and foreign policy and the preparation of government programmes, policy concepts and draft legislation.

Rahmonqulov later became deputy director of the Institute for Monitoring Current Legislation under the President of Uzbekistan. By January 2020, he was serving as first deputy director of the Institute for Strategic and Regional Studies.

On 6 May 2022, he was appointed deputy adviser to the President of Uzbekistan for civil service and cooperation with representative bodies of government.

In December 2022, he left that position after being appointed director of the Institute of Legislation and Legal Policy under the President of Uzbekistan.

As director, he oversaw legal and policy research on legislation, constitutional development, public administration, legal policy and strategic planning.

== Parliamentary career ==
In January 2015, President Islam Karimov appointed Rahmonqulov as a member of the Senate of the Oliy Majlis. At the time, he was deputy director of the Institute for Monitoring Current Legislation.

On 18 January 2020, President Shavkat Mirziyoyev reappointed him to the Senate. The presidential decree described him as first deputy director of the Institute for Strategic and Regional Studies.

In May 2022, Rahmonqulov was appointed to the Constitutional Commission established to prepare proposals for amendments to the Constitution of Uzbekistan. He was then a member of the Senate Committee on Defence and Security.

On 16 November 2024, Mirziyoyev again appointed him to the Senate. The decree identified him as director of the Institute of Legislation and Legal Policy.

At the first plenary session of the newly constituted Senate on 19 November 2024, he was elected deputy chairman of the Committee on Judicial and Legal Issues and Anti-Corruption.

== Constitutional and legal-policy work ==
Rahmonqulov participated in the development of state programmes, policy concepts and draft legislation concerning the constitutional system, public administration, foreign policy and national security.

Following the adoption of the revised Constitution of Uzbekistan in 2023, he chaired the editorial council responsible for preparing an article-by-article scholarly and practical commentary on the Constitution. The Institute of Legislation and Legal Policy was designated as the council's working body.

The same presidential decree assigned the institute, under Rahmonqulov's leadership, responsibilities connected with launching the national portal “Constitution of New Uzbekistan”, reviewing subordinate legislation and identifying provisions that required alignment with the revised Constitution.

== Scholarship ==
Rahmonqulov was a Doctor of Law and professor. His research covered civil law, international law, constitutional law, parliamentarism, state power and administration, and national and regional security.

According to the Institute of Legislation and Legal Policy, he authored hundreds of academic publications, including research papers, monographs and methodological works. His publications addressed the development of Uzbekistan's legal system, legal aspects of foreign policy, regional security and cooperation with foreign states.

He also participated in academic supervision and the training of legal researchers and specialists. His political and legal studies were used in work on government programmes, institutional reforms and draft legislation.

== International cooperation ==
As director of the Institute of Legislation and Legal Policy, Rahmonqulov represented the institute in international academic and legal-policy cooperation. In 2024, he headed institutional delegations that met universities, research institutions, parliamentary representatives and legal organisations in the United Kingdom, Russia, Slovenia and France.

In January 2025, Rahmonqulov and the International Organization for Migration's chief of mission in Uzbekistan signed a memorandum of understanding on migration research, policy development, legal analysis and professional training.

== Awards ==
Rahmonqulov received several state awards and honours, including:

- the honorary title of Honoured Lawyer of the Republic of Uzbekistan;
- the Order of Fidokorona Xizmatlari Uchun;
- the Order of Shon-Sharaf, 2nd Class.

== Death ==
Rahmonqulov died in Tashkent on 11 February 2026.

The official presidential condolence described him as a statesman, legal scholar, senator and public servant who had worked on strategic research, national security, legislation and legal policy.

On 27 February 2026, the Council of the Senate formally relieved him of the position of deputy chairman of the Committee on Judicial and Legal Issues and Anti-Corruption and recorded the termination of his committee membership due to his death.
