= Tashkent explosion =

2023 fatal blast in Uzbekistan

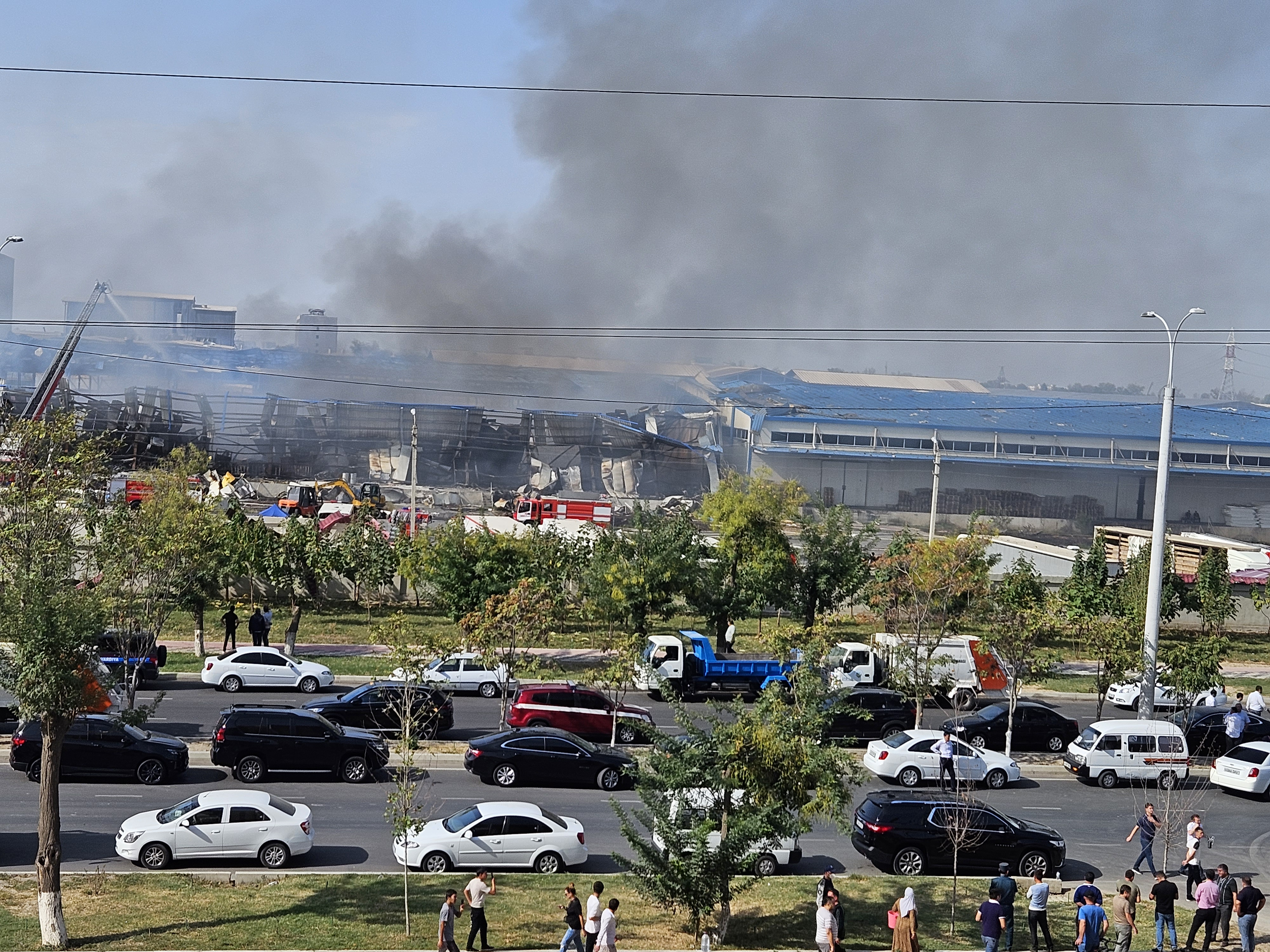
- Image of exploded warehouse after fire was tamed

- Tashkent explosion (Uzbekistan)
- Date: 28 September 2023
- Location: Tashkent, Uzbekistan; 41°15′28.3″N 69°16′52.27″E
- Type: Explosion
- Deaths: 1
- Injuries: 162

The Tashkent explosion was an explosion that occurred in a warehouse in Sergeli District of Tashkent, the capital of Uzbekistan, on 28 September 2023, killing one person and injuring 162.

== Explosion ==
Around 3:00 a.m. of 28 September 2023, a large explosion in the Sergeli district, near the airport in Tashkent, Uzbekistan killed one person and injured 162 people. According to local media, the shock wave was felt 30 kilometers away. Sixteen teams of firemen worked to contain the fire resulting from the explosion, which was contained by 5:02 a.m. The Ministry of Emergency Situations said the explosion was probably caused by a lightning strike in a warehouse containing flammable objects.

== Aftermath ==
The one confirmed death from the explosion was a teenage boy who was killed after a window frame fell on him, and 24 people who were injured were subsequently admitted to hospitals for treatment. The majority of injuries came from flying glass that broke apart from buildings following the explosion.

A special field laboratory has been ordered to investigate how the explosion could have occurred.
