= International rankings of Uzbekistan =

Rankings of Uzbekistan in country surveys

These are the international rankings of Uzbekistan.

== International rankings ==
Organization	Survey	Ranking
Institute for Economics and Peace	Global Peace Index	106 out of 144
United Nations Development Programme	Human Development Index	119 out of 182
Transparency International	Corruption Perceptions Index	174 out of 180
World Intellectual Property Organization	Global Innovation Index, 2026	77 out of 139
