= Akbar Tashkulov =

Uzbek politician

Minister of Justice
- Incumbent
- Assumed office November 16, 2022
- President: Shavkat Mirziyoyev
- Prime Minister: Abdulla Aripov
- Preceded by: Ruslanbek Davletov

Personal details
- Born: Akbar Djurabayevich Tashkulov; September 21, 1971 (age 54) Jizzakh Region, Uzbek SSR, USSR
- Education: Tashkent State University of Law
- Occupation: Minister of Justice of the Republic of Uzbekistan

Akbar Djurabayevich Tashkulov (Uzbek: Акбар Жўрабоевич Тошқулов, Akbar Joʻraboyevich Toshqulov; Russian: Акбар Джурабаевич Ташкулов, born September 21, 1971, in Jizzakh region) is the Minister of Justice of Uzbekistan, a legal expert, and a senior justice advisor.

== Career ==
In 1994, he graduated from the Tashkent State Institute of Law. He began his career in 1994-1995 as a senior justice advisor at the International Legal Department of the Ministry of Justice of the Republic of Uzbekistan.

From 1995 to 1997, he worked as the head of the department for preparing legislative and regulatory legal acts and conducting legal expertise at the Ministry of Justice of the Republic of Uzbekistan.

He held leadership positions within the ministry from 1997 to 2000.
