= Mohammad Akrom =

Indonesian professional footballer

Personal information
- Full name: Mohammad Akrom
- Date of birth: 28 February 2003 (age 23)
- Place of birth: Surabaya, Indonesia
- Height: 1.77 m (5 ft 10 in)
- Position: Forward

Team information
- Current team: Sylva Kalteng
- Number: 11

Youth career
- 2012–2015: SSB Academy WCP
- 2016–2020: Bintang Timur
- 2021: KSA Academy
- 2022: Persebaya Surabaya

Senior career*
Years	Team	Apps	(Gls)
2022–2023	Persikab Bandung	1	(0)
2023–2024	PSIS Semarang	1	(0)
2026–	Sylva Kalteng	1	(0)
- * Club domestic league appearances and goals as of 5 August 2023

Mohammad Akrom (born 28 February 2003) is an Indonesian professional footballer who plays as a forward for Liga 4 club Sylva Kalteng.

== Early life ==
Born in 2003, Akrom was born in Surabaya, East Java, Indonesia.

== Club career ==
=== Youth career ===
As a youth player, Akrom joined SSB Academy WCP until the last time he was with Persebaya Surabaya.

=== Persikab Bandung ===
In May 2022, Akrom is contracted by Persikab Bandung to sail in Liga 2.

=== PSIS Semarang ===
In May 2023, Akrom recruited by PSIS Semarang. Akrom made his debut on 5 August 2023 in a match against Madura United at the Gelora Bangkalan Stadium, Bangkalan.

== International career ==
In August 2022 Akrom was called up the Indonesia U20 for the training centre in preparation for 2023 AFC U-20 Asian Cup qualification.

== Career statistics ==
=== Club ===
As of 5 August 2023

Club	Season	League			Cup		Continental		Other		Total	
Club	Season	Division	Apps	Goals	Apps	Goals	Apps	Goals	Apps	Goals	Apps	Goals
Persikab Bandung	2022–23	Liga 2	1	0	0	0	–		0	0	1	0
PSIS Semarang	2023–24	Liga 1	1	0	0	0	–		0	0	1	0
Career total			2	0	0	0	0	0	0	0	2	0
