= List of birds of Uzbekistan =

This is a list of the bird species recorded in Uzbekistan. The avifauna of Uzbekistan include a total of 483 species.

This list's taxonomic treatment (designation and sequence of orders, families and species) and nomenclature (common and scientific names) follow the conventions of The Clements Checklist of Birds of the World, 2022 edition. The family accounts at the beginning of each heading reflect this taxonomy, as do the species counts found in each family account. Accidental species are included in the total species count for Uzbekistan.

The following tag has been used to highlight accidental species.

- (A) Accidental - a species that rarely or accidentally occurs in Uzbekistan

== Ducks, geese, and waterfowl ==
Order: Anseriformes Family: Anatidae

Anatidae includes the ducks and most duck-like waterfowl, such as geese and swans. These birds are adapted to an aquatic existence with webbed feet, flattened bills, and feathers that are excellent at shedding water due to an oily coating.

- Bar-headed goose, Anser indicus (A)
- Snow goose, Anser caerulescens (A)
- Graylag goose, Anser anser
- Swan goose, Anser cygnoides (A)
- Greater white-fronted goose, Anser albifrons
- Lesser white-fronted goose, Anser erythropus (A)
- Taiga bean-goose, Anser fabalis (A)
- Brant, Branta bernicla (A)
- Red-breasted goose, Branta ruficollis (A)
- Mute swan, Cygnus olor
- Tundra swan, Cygnus columbianus (A)
- Whooper swan, Cygnus cygnus
- Ruddy shelduck, Tadorna ferruginea
- Common shelduck, Tadorna tadorna
- Baikal teal, Sibirionetta formosa (A)
- Garganey, Spatula querquedula
- Northern shoveler, Spatula clypeata
- Gadwall, Mareca strepera
- Falcated duck, Mareca falcata (A)
- Eurasian wigeon, Mareca penelope
- Eastern spot-billed duck, Anas zonorhyncha (A)
- Mallard, Anas platyrhynchos
- Northern pintail, Anas acuta
- Green-winged teal, Anas crecca
- Marbled teal, Marmaronetta angustirostris
- Red-crested pochard, Netta rufina
- Common pochard, Aythya ferina
- Ferruginous duck, Aythya nyroca
- Tufted duck, Aythya fuligula
- Greater scaup, Aythya marila
- Velvet scoter, Melanitta fusca (A)
- Common scoter, Melanitta nigra (A)
- Long-tailed duck, Clangula hyemalis
- Common goldeneye, Bucephala clangula
- Smew, Mergellus albellus
- Common merganser, Mergus merganser
- Red-breasted merganser, Mergus serrator
- White-headed duck, Oxyura leucocephala

== Pheasants, grouse, and allies ==
Order: Galliformes Family: Phasianidae

The Phasianidae are a family of terrestrial birds which consists of quails, partridges, snowcocks, francolins, spurfowls, tragopans, monals, pheasants, peafowls and jungle fowls. In general, they are plump (although they vary in size) and have broad, relatively short wings.

- Gray partridge, Perdix perdix
- Daurian partridge, Perdix dauurica
- Ring-necked pheasant, Phasianus colchicus
- Himalayan snowcock, Tetraogallus himalayensis
- See-see partridge, Ammoperdix griseogularis
- Common quail, Coturnix coturnix
- Chukar, Alectoris chukar

== Flamingos ==
Order: Phoenicopteriformes Family: Phoenicopteridae

Flamingos are gregarious wading birds, usually 3 to 5 feet (0.9 to 1.5 m) tall, found in both the Western and Eastern Hemispheres. Flamingos filter-feed on shellfish and algae. Their oddly shaped beaks are specially adapted to separate mud and silt from the food they consume and, uniquely, are used upside-down.

- Greater flamingo, Phoenicopterus roseus (A)

== Grebes ==
Order: Podicipediformes Family: Podicipedidae

Grebes are small to medium-large freshwater diving birds. They have lobed toes and are excellent swimmers and divers. However, they have their feet placed far back on the body, making them quite ungainly on land.

- Little grebe, Tachybaptus ruficollis
- Horned grebe, Podiceps auritus
- Red-necked grebe, Podiceps grisegena
- Great crested grebe, Podiceps cristatus
- Eared grebe, Podiceps nigricollis

== Pigeons and doves ==
Order: Columbiformes Family: Columbidae

Pigeons and doves are stout-bodied birds with short necks and short slender bills with a fleshy cere.

- Rock pigeon, Columba livia
- Hill pigeon, Columba rupestris
- Stock dove, Columba oenas
- Yellow-eyed pigeon, Columba eversmanni (A)
- Common wood-pigeon, Columba palumbus
- European turtle-dove, Streptopelia turtur
- Oriental turtle-dove, Streptopelia orientalis
- Eurasian collared-dove, Streptopelia decaocto
- Laughing dove, Streptopelia senegalensis
- Namaqua dove, Oena capensis (A)

== Sandgrouse ==
Order: Pterocliformes Family: Pteroclidae

Sandgrouse have small, pigeon like heads and necks, but sturdy compact bodies. They have long pointed wings and sometimes tails and a fast direct flight. Flocks fly to watering holes at dawn and dusk. Their legs are feathered down to the toes.

- Pallas's sandgrouse, Syrrhaptes paradoxus
- Pin-tailed sandgrouse, Pterocles alchata
- Black-bellied sandgrouse, Pterocles orientalis

== Bustards ==
Order: Otidiformes Family: Otididae

Bustards are large terrestrial birds mainly associated with dry open country and steppes in the Old World. They are omnivorous and nest on the ground. They walk steadily on strong legs and big toes, pecking for food as they go. They have long broad wings with "fingered" wingtips and striking patterns in flight. Many have interesting mating displays.

- Great bustard, Otis tarda (A)
- MacQueen's bustard, Chlamydotis macqueenii
- Little bustard, Tetrax tetrax

== Cuckoos ==
Order: Cuculiformes Family: Cuculidae

The family Cuculidae includes cuckoos, roadrunners and anis. These birds are of variable size with slender bodies, long tails and strong legs. The Old World cuckoos are brood parasites.

- Lesser cuckoo, Cuculus poliocephalus
- Common cuckoo, Cuculus canorus
- Oriental cuckoo, Cuculus optatus

== Nightjars and allies ==
Order: Caprimulgiformes Family: Caprimulgidae

Nightjars are medium-sized nocturnal birds that usually nest on the ground. They have long wings, short legs and very short bills. Most have small feet, of little use for walking, and long pointed wings. Their soft plumage is camouflaged to resemble bark or leaves.

- Eurasian nightjar, Caprimulgus europaeus
- Egyptian nightjar, Caprimulgus aegyptius

== Swifts ==
Order: Caprimulgiformes Family: Apodidae

Swifts are small birds which spend the majority of their lives flying. These birds have very short legs and never settle voluntarily on the ground, perching instead only on vertical surfaces. Many swifts have long swept-back wings which resemble a crescent or boomerang.

- White-throated needletail, Hirundapus caudacutus (A)
- Alpine swift, Apus melba
- Common swift, Apus apus
- Pacific swift, Apus pacificus (A)
- Little swift, Apus affinis (A)

== Rails, gallinules, and coots ==
Order: Gruiformes Family: Rallidae

Rallidae is a large family of small to medium-sized birds which includes the rails, crakes, coots and gallinules. Typically they inhabit dense vegetation in damp environments near lakes, swamps or rivers. In general they are shy and secretive birds, making them difficult to observe. Most species have strong legs and long toes which are well adapted to soft uneven surfaces. They tend to have short, rounded wings and to be weak fliers.

- Water rail, Rallus aquaticus
- Corn crake, Crex crex
- Spotted crake, Porzana porzana
- Eurasian moorhen, Gallinula chloropus
- Eurasian coot, Fulica atra
- Gray-headed swamphen, Porphyrio poliocephalus
- Little crake, Zapornia parva
- Baillon's crake, Zapornia pusilla

== Cranes ==
Order: Gruiformes Family: Gruidae

Cranes are large, long-legged and long-necked birds. Unlike the similar-looking but unrelated herons, cranes fly with necks outstretched, not pulled back. Most have elaborate and noisy courting displays or "dances".

- Demoiselle crane, Anthropoides virgo
- Siberian crane, Leucogeranus leucogeranus (A)
- Common crane, Grus grus

== Thick-knees ==
Order: Charadriiformes Family: Burhinidae

The thick-knees are a group of largely tropical waders in the family Burhinidae. They are found worldwide within the tropical zone, with some species also breeding in temperate Europe and Australia. They are medium to large waders with strong black or yellow-black bills, large yellow eyes and cryptic plumage. Despite being classed as waders, most species have a preference for arid or semi-arid habitats.

- Eurasian thick-knee, Burhinus oedicnemus

== Stilts and avocets ==
Order: Charadriiformes Family: Recurvirostridae

Recurvirostridae is a family of large wading birds, which includes the avocets and stilts. The avocets have long legs and long up-curved bills. The stilts have extremely long legs and long, thin, straight bills.

- Black-winged stilt, Himantopus himantopus
- Pied avocet, Recurvirostra avosetta

== Ibisbill ==
Order: Charadriiformes Family: Ibidorhynchidae

The ibisbill is related to the waders, but is sufficiently distinctive to be a family unto itself. The adult is grey with a white belly, red legs, a long down curved bill, and a black face and breast band.

- Ibisbill, Ibidorhyncha struthersii (A)

== Oystercatchers ==
Order: Charadriiformes Family: Haematopodidae

The oystercatchers are large and noisy plover-like birds, with strong bills used for smashing or prising open molluscs.

- Eurasian oystercatcher, Haematopus ostralegus

== Plovers and lapwings ==
Order: Charadriiformes Family: Charadriidae

The family Charadriidae includes the plovers, dotterels and lapwings. They are small to medium-sized birds with compact bodies, short, thick necks and long, usually pointed, wings. They are found in open country worldwide, mostly in habitats near water.

- Black-bellied plover, Pluvialis squatarola
- European golden-plover, Pluvialis apricaria (A)
- Pacific golden-plover, Pluvialis fulva (A)
- Northern lapwing, Vanellus vanellus
- Red-wattled lapwing, Vanellus indicus (A)
- Sociable lapwing, Vanellus gregarius (A)
- White-tailed lapwing, Vanellus leucurus
- Greater sand-plover, Charadrius leschenaultii
- Caspian plover, Charadrius asiaticus
- Kentish plover, Charadrius alexandrinus
- Common ringed plover, Charadrius hiaticula
- Little ringed plover, Charadrius dubius
- Oriental plover, Charadrius veredus (A)
- Eurasian dotterel, Charadrius morinellus (A)

== Sandpipers and allies ==
Order: Charadriiformes Family: Scolopacidae

Scolopacidae is a large diverse family of small to medium-sized shorebirds including the sandpipers, curlews, godwits, shanks, tattlers, woodcocks, snipes, dowitchers and phalaropes. The majority of these species eat small invertebrates picked out of the mud or soil. Variation in length of legs and bills enables multiple species to feed in the same habitat, particularly on the coast, without direct competition for food.

- Whimbrel, Numenius phaeopus
- Slender-billed curlew, Numenius tenuirostris (A)
- Eurasian curlew, Numenius arquata
- Bar-tailed godwit, Limosa lapponica
- Black-tailed godwit, Limosa limosa
- Ruddy turnstone, Arenaria interpres
- Ruff, Calidris pugnax
- Broad-billed sandpiper, Calidris falcinellus
- Curlew sandpiper, Calidris ferruginea
- Temminck's stint, Calidris temminckii
- Long-toed stint, Calidris subminuta (A)
- Sanderling, Calidris alba
- Dunlin, Calidris alpina
- Little stint, Calidris minuta
- Asian dowitcher, Limnodromus semipalmatus (A)
- Jack snipe, Lymnocryptes minimus
- Eurasian woodcock, Scolopax rusticola
- Solitary snipe, Gallinago solitaria (A)
- Great snipe, Gallinago media (A)
- Common snipe, Gallinago gallinago
- Pin-tailed snipe, Gallinago stenura (A)
- Swinhoe's snipe, Gallinago megala (A)
- Terek sandpiper, Xenus cinereus
- Red-necked phalarope, Phalaropus lobatus
- Red phalarope, Phalaropus fulicarius (A)
- Common sandpiper, Actitis hypoleucos
- Green sandpiper, Tringa ochropus
- Spotted redshank, Tringa erythropus
- Common greenshank, Tringa nebularia
- Marsh sandpiper, Tringa stagnatilis
- Wood sandpiper, Tringa glareola
- Common redshank, Tringa totanus

== Pratincoles and coursers ==
Order: Charadriiformes Family: Glareolidae

Glareolidae is a family of wading birds comprising the pratincoles, which have short legs, long pointed wings and long forked tails, and the coursers, which have long legs, short wings and long, pointed bills which curve downwards.

- Cream-colored courser, Cursorius cursor (A)
- Collared pratincole, Glareola pratincola
- Oriental pratincole, Glareola maldivarum (A)
- Black-winged pratincole, Glareola nordmanni (A)

== Skuas and jaegers ==
Order: Charadriiformes Family: Stercorariidae

The family Stercorariidae are, in general, medium to large birds, typically with gray or brown plumage, often with white markings on the wings. They nest on the ground in temperate and arctic regions and are long-distance migrants.

- Pomarine jaeger, Stercorarius pomarinus (A)
- Parasitic jaeger, Stercorarius parasiticus (A)
- Long-tailed jaeger, Stercorarius longicaudus (A)

== Gulls, terns, and skimmers ==
Order: Charadriiformes Family: Laridae

Laridae is a family of medium to large seabirds, the gulls, terns, and skimmers. Gulls are typically grey or white, often with black markings on the head or wings. They have stout, longish bills and webbed feet. Terns are a group of generally medium to large seabirds typically with grey or white plumage, often with black markings on the head. Most terns hunt fish by diving but some pick insects off the surface of fresh water. Terns are generally long-lived birds, with several species known to live in excess of 30 years.

- Black-legged kittiwake, Rissa tridactyla (A)
- Slender-billed gull, Chroicocephalus genei
- Black-headed gull, Chroicocephalus ridibundus
- Brown-headed gull, Chroicocephalus brunnicephalus (A)
- Little gull, Hydrocoloeus minutus (A)
- Relict gull, Ichthyaetus relictus (A)
- Pallas's gull, Ichthyaetus ichthyaetus
- Common gull, Larus canus
- Caspian gull, Larus cachinnans
- Lesser black-backed gull, Larus fuscus
- Little tern, Sternula albifrons
- Gull-billed tern, Gelochelidon nilotica
- Caspian tern, Hydroprogne caspia
- Black tern, Chlidonias niger
- White-winged tern, Chlidonias leucopterus
- Whiskered tern, Chlidonias hybrida
- Common tern, Sterna hirundo
- Sandwich tern, Thalasseus sandvicensis (A)

== Loons ==
Order: Gaviiformes Family: Gaviidae

Loons, known as divers in Europe, are a group of aquatic birds found in many parts of North America and northern Europe. They are the size of a large duck or small goose, which they somewhat resemble when swimming, but to which they are completely unrelated.

- Red-throated loon, Gavia stellata
- Arctic loon, Gavia arctica (A)

== Storks ==
Order: Ciconiiformes Family: Ciconiidae

Storks are large, long-legged, long-necked, wading birds with long, stout bills. Storks are mute, but bill-clattering is an important mode of communication at the nest. Their nests can be large and may be reused for many years. Many species are migratory.

- Black stork, Ciconia nigra
- White stork, Ciconia ciconia

== Anhingas ==
Order: Suliformes Family: Anhingidae

Anhingas or darters are often called "snake-birds" because of their long thin neck, which gives a snake-like appearance when they swim with their bodies submerged. The males have black and dark-brown plumage, an erectile crest on the nape and a larger bill than the female. The females have much paler plumage especially on the neck and underparts. The darters have completely webbed feet and their legs are short and set far back on the body. Their plumage is somewhat permeable, like that of cormorants, and they spread their wings to dry after diving.

- Oriental darter, Anhinga melanogaster (A)

== Cormorants and shags ==
Order: Suliformes Family: Phalacrocoracidae

Phalacrocoracidae is a family of medium to large coastal, fish-eating seabirds that includes cormorants and shags. Plumage colouration varies, with the majority having mainly dark plumage, some species being black-and-white and a few being colourful.

- Pygmy cormorant, Microcarbo pygmeus
- Great cormorant, Phalacrocorax carbo

== Pelicans ==
Order: Pelecaniformes Family: Pelecanidae

Pelicans are large water birds with a distinctive pouch under their beak. As with other members of the order Pelecaniformes, they have webbed feet with four toes.

- Great white pelican, Pelecanus onocrotalus
- Dalmatian pelican, Pelecanus crispus

== Herons, egrets, and bitterns ==
Order: Pelecaniformes Family: Ardeidae

The family Ardeidae contains the bitterns, herons, and egrets. Herons and egrets are medium to large wading birds with long necks and legs. Bitterns tend to be shorter necked and more wary. Members of Ardeidae fly with their necks retracted, unlike other long-necked birds such as storks, ibises and spoonbills.

- Great bittern, Botaurus stellaris
- Little bittern, Ixobrychus minutus
- Gray heron, Ardea cinerea
- Purple heron, Ardea purpurea
- Great egret, Ardea alba
- Little egret, Egretta garzetta
- Cattle egret, Bubulcus ibis
- Squacco heron, Ardeola ralloides
- Indian pond-heron, Ardeola grayii (A)
- Black-crowned night-heron, Nycticorax nycticorax

== Ibises and spoonbills ==
Order: Pelecaniformes Family: Threskiornithidae

Threskiornithidae is a family of large terrestrial and wading birds which includes the ibises and spoonbills. They have long, broad wings with 11 primary and about 20 secondary feathers. They are strong fliers and despite their size and weight, very capable soarers.

- Glossy ibis, Plegadis falcinellus
- Black-headed ibis, Threskiornis melanocephalus (A)
- Eurasian spoonbill, Platalea leucorodia (A)

== Osprey ==
Order: Accipitriformes Family: Pandionidae

The family Pandionidae contains only one species, the osprey. The osprey is a medium-large raptor which is a specialist fish-eater with a worldwide distribution.

- Osprey, Pandion haliaetus

== Hawks, eagles, and kites ==
Order: Accipitriformes Family: Accipitridae

Accipitridae is a family of birds of prey, which includes hawks, eagles, kites, harriers and Old World vultures. These birds have powerful hooked beaks for tearing flesh from their prey, strong legs, powerful talons and keen eyesight.

- Black-winged kite, Elanus caeruleus (A)
- Bearded vulture, Gypaetus barbatus (A)
- Egyptian vulture, Neophron percnopterus
- European honey-buzzard, Pernis apivorus
- Oriental honey-buzzard, Pernis ptilorhynchus
- Cinereous vulture, Aegypius monachus
- Himalayan griffon, Gyps himalayensis
- Eurasian griffon, Gyps fulvus
- Short-toed snake-eagle, Circaetus gallicus
- Greater spotted eagle, Clanga clanga (A) (possibly extirpated)
- Booted eagle, Hieraaetus pennatus
- Tawny eagle, Aquila rapax (A)
- Steppe eagle, Aquila nipalensis
- Imperial eagle, Aquila heliaca
- Golden eagle, Aquila chrysaetos
- Bonelli's eagle, Aquila fasciata (A)
- Eurasian marsh-harrier, Circus aeruginosus
- Hen harrier, Circus cyaneus
- Pallid harrier, Circus macrourus
- Montagu's harrier, Circus pygargus
- Shikra, Accipiter badius
- Levant sparrowhawk, Accipiter brevipes (A)
- Eurasian sparrowhawk, Accipiter nisus
- Northern goshawk, Accipiter gentilis (A)
- Black kite, Milvus migrans (A)
- White-tailed eagle, Haliaeetus albicilla
- Pallas's fish-eagle, Haliaeetus leucoryphus (A)
- Rough-legged hawk, Buteo lagopus
- Common buzzard, Buteo buteo
- Eastern buzzard, Buteo japonicus
- Long-legged buzzard, Buteo rufinus
- Upland buzzard, Buteo hemilasius (A)

== Owls ==
Order: Strigiformes Family: Strigidae

The typical owls are small to large solitary nocturnal birds of prey. They have large forward-facing eyes and ears, a hawk-like beak and a conspicuous circle of feathers around each eye called a facial disk.

- Eurasian scops-owl, Otus scops
- Pallid scops-owl, Otus brucei (A)
- Eurasian eagle-owl, Bubo bubo (A)
- Snowy owl, Bubo scandiacus (A)
- Little owl, Athene noctua
- Tawny owl, Strix aluco
- Long-eared owl, Asio otus
- Short-eared owl, Asio flammeus

== Hoopoes ==
Order: Bucerotiformes Family: Upupidae

Hoopoes have black, white and orangey-pink colouring with a large erectile crest on their head.

- Eurasian hoopoe, Upupa epops

== Kingfishers ==
Order: Coraciiformes Family: Alcedinidae

Kingfishers are medium-sized birds with large heads, long, pointed bills, short legs and stubby tails.

- Common kingfisher, Alcedo atthis

== Bee-eaters ==
Order: Coraciiformes Family: Meropidae

The bee-eaters are a group of near passerine birds in the family Meropidae. Most species are found in Africa but others occur in southern Europe, Madagascar, Australia and New Guinea. They are characterised by richly coloured plumage, slender bodies and usually elongated central tail feathers. All are colourful and have long downturned bills and pointed wings, which give them a swallow-like appearance when seen from afar.

- Blue-cheeked bee-eater, Merops persicus
- European bee-eater, Merops apiaster

== Rollers ==
Order: Coraciiformes Family: Coraciidae

Rollers resemble crows in size and build, but are more closely related to the kingfishers and bee-eaters. They share the colourful appearance of those groups with blues and browns predominating. The two inner front toes are connected, but the outer toe is not.

- European roller, Coracias garrulus

== Woodpeckers ==
Order: Piciformes Family: Picidae

Woodpeckers are small to medium-sized birds with chisel-like beaks, short legs, stiff tails and long tongues used for capturing insects. Some species have feet with two toes pointing forward and two backward, while several species have only three toes. Many woodpeckers have the habit of tapping noisily on tree trunks with their beaks.

- Eurasian wryneck, Jynx torquilla
- White-winged woodpecker, Dendrocopos leucopterus
- Lesser spotted woodpecker, Dryobates minor (A)

== Falcons and caracaras ==
Order: Falconiformes Family: Falconidae

Falconidae is a family of diurnal birds of prey. They differ from hawks, eagles and kites in that they kill with their beaks instead of their talons.

- Lesser kestrel, Falco naumanni
- Eurasian kestrel, Falco tinnunculus
- Red-footed falcon, Falco vespertinus (A)
- Merlin, Falco columbarius
- Eurasian hobby, Falco subbuteo
- Laggar falcon, Falco jugger (A)
- Saker falcon, Falco cherrug
- Peregrine falcon, Falco peregrinus

== Old world parrots ==
Order: Psittaciformes Family: Psittaculidae

Characteristic features of parrots include a strong curved bill, an upright stance, strong legs, and clawed zygodactyl feet. Many parrots are vividly coloured, and some are multi-coloured. In size they range from 8 cm (3.1 in) to 1 m (3.3 ft) in length. Old World parrots are found from Africa east across south and southeast Asia and Oceania to Australia and New Zealand.

- Rose-ringed parakeet, Psittacula krameri

== Old World orioles ==
Order: Passeriformes Family: Oriolidae

The Old World orioles are colourful passerine birds. They are not related to the New World orioles.

- Eurasian golden oriole, Oriolus oriolus
- Indian golden oriole, Oriolus kundoo

== Drongos ==
Order: Passeriformes Family: Dicruridae

The drongos are mostly black or dark gray in color, sometimes with metallic tints. They have long forked tails, and some Asian species have elaborate tail decorations. They have short legs and sit very upright when perched, like a shrike. They flycatch or take prey from the ground.

- Black drongo, Dicrurus macrocercus (A)

== Monarch flycatchers ==
Order: Passeriformes Family: Monarchidae

The monarch flycatchers are small to medium-sized insectivorous passerines which hunt by flycatching.

- Indian paradise-flycatcher, Terpsiphone paradisi

== Shrikes ==
Order: Passeriformes Family: Laniidae

Shrikes are passerine birds known for their habit of catching other birds and small animals and impaling the uneaten portions of their bodies on thorns. A typical shrike's beak is hooked, like a bird of prey.

- Red-backed shrike, Lanius collurio
- Red-tailed shrike, Lanius phoenicuroides
- Isabelline shrike, Lanius isabellinus
- Brown shrike, Lanius cristatus (A)
- Long-tailed shrike, Lanius schach
- Northern shrike, Lanius borealis
- Great gray shrike, Lanius excubitor
- Lesser gray shrike, Lanius minor
- Woodchat shrike, Lanius senator (A)

== Crows, jays, and magpies ==
Order: Passeriformes Family: Corvidae

The family Corvidae includes crows, ravens, jays, choughs, magpies, treepies, nutcrackers and ground jays. Corvids are above average in size among the Passeriformes, and some of the larger species show high levels of intelligence.

- Eurasian magpie, Pica pica
- Turkestan ground-jay, Podoces panderi
- Red-billed chough, Pyrrhocorax pyrrhocorax
- Yellow-billed chough, Pyrrhocorax graculus
- Eurasian jackdaw, Corvus monedula
- Daurian jackdaw, Corvus dauuricus
- Rook, Corvus frugilegus
- Carrion crow, Corvus corone
- Hooded crow, Corvus cornix
- Large-billed crow, Corvus macrorhynchos (A)
- Brown-necked raven, Corvus ruficollis
- Common raven, Corvus corax

== Tits, chickadees, and titmice ==
Order: Passeriformes Family: Paridae

The Paridae are mainly small stocky woodland species with short stout bills. Some have crests. They are adaptable birds, with a mixed diet including seeds and insects.

- Rufous-naped tit, Periparus rufonuchalis
- Willow tit, Poecile montanus (A)
- Eurasian blue tit, Cyanistes caeruleus (A)
- Azure tit, Cyanistes cyanus
- Great tit, Parus major

== Penduline-tits ==
Order: Passeriformes Family: Remizidae

The penduline-tits are a group of small passerine birds related to the true tits. They are insectivores.

- Eurasian penduline-tit, Remiz pendulinus (A)
- Black-headed penduline-tit, Remiz macronyx (A)
- White-crowned penduline-tit, Remiz coronatus

== Larks ==
Order: Passeriformes Family: Alaudidae

Larks are small terrestrial birds with often extravagant songs and display flights. Most larks are fairly dull in appearance. Their food is insects and seeds.

- Greater hoopoe-lark, Alaemon alaudipes (A)
- Desert lark, Ammomanes deserti (A)
- Horned lark, Eremophila alpestris (A)
- Greater short-toed lark, Calandrella brachydactyla
- Hume's lark, Calandrella acutirostris
- Bimaculated lark, Melanocorypha bimaculata
- Calandra lark, Melanocorypha calandra
- Black lark, Melanocorypha yeltoniensis (A)
- Asian short-toed lark, Alaudala cheleensis (A)
- Turkestan short-toed lark, Alaudala heinei (A)
- White-winged lark, Alauda leucoptera (A)
- Eurasian skylark, Alauda arvensis
- Oriental skylark, Alauda gulgula
- Crested lark, Galerida cristata

== Bearded reedling ==
Order: Passeriformes Family: Panuridae

This species, the only one in its family, is found in reed beds throughout temperate Europe and Asia.

- Bearded reedling, Panurus biarmicus

== Reed warblers and allies ==
Order: Passeriformes Family: Acrocephalidae

The members of this family are usually rather large for "warblers". Most are rather plain olivaceous brown above with much yellow to beige below. They are usually found in open woodland, reedbeds, or tall grass. The family occurs mostly in southern to western Eurasia and surroundings, but it also ranges far into the Pacific, with some species in Africa.

- Booted warbler, Iduna caligata
- Sykes's warbler, Iduna rama
- Eastern olivaceous warbler, Iduna pallida
- Upcher's warbler, Hippolais languida
- Moustached warbler, Acrocephalus melanopogon
- Sedge warbler, Acrocephalus schoenobaenus (A)
- Paddyfield warbler, Acrocephalus agricola
- Blyth's reed warbler, Acrocephalus dumetorum
- Large-billed reed warbler, Acrocephalus orinus (A)
- Marsh warbler, Acrocephalus palustris (A)
- Eurasian reed warbler, Acrocephalus scirpaceus
- Great reed warbler, Acrocephalus arundinaceus
- Clamorous reed warbler, Acrocephalus stentoreus

== Grassbirds and allies ==
Order: Passeriformes Family: Locustellidae

Locustellidae are a family of small insectivorous songbirds found mainly in Eurasia, Africa, and the Australian region. They are smallish birds with tails that are usually long and pointed, and tend to be drab brownish or buffy all over.

- Pallas's grasshopper warbler, Helopsaltes certhiola (A)
- Lanceolated warbler, Locustella lanceolata (A)
- River warbler, Locustella fluviatilis (A)
- Savi's warbler, Locustella luscinioides
- Common grasshopper-warbler, Locustella naevia
- Long-billed bush warbler, Locustella major

== Swallows ==
Order: Passeriformes Family: Hirundinidae

The family Hirundinidae is adapted to aerial feeding. They have a slender streamlined body, long pointed wings and a short bill with a wide gape. The feet are adapted to perching rather than walking, and the front toes are partially joined at the base.

- Gray-throated martin, Riparia chinensis (A)
- Bank swallow, Riparia riparia
- Pale sand martin, Riparia diluta
- Eurasian crag-martin, Ptyonoprogne rupestris
- Barn swallow, Hirundo rustica
- Wire-tailed swallow, Hirundo smithii (A)
- Red-rumped swallow, Cecropis daurica
- Common house-martin, Delichon urbicum

== Leaf warblers ==
Order: Passeriformes Family: Phylloscopidae

Leaf warblers are a family of small insectivorous birds found mostly in Eurasia and ranging into Wallacea and Africa. The species are of various sizes, often green-plumaged above and yellow below, or more subdued with greyish-green to greyish-brown colours.

- Wood warbler, Phylloscopus sibilatrix (A)
- Hume's warbler, Phylloscopus humei
- Pallas's leaf warbler, Phylloscopus proregulus (A)
- Sulphur-bellied warbler, Phylloscopus griseolus
- Dusky warbler, Phylloscopus fuscatus (A)
- Plain leaf warbler, Phylloscopus neglectus (A)
- Willow warbler, Phylloscopus trochilus (A)
- Common chiffchaff, Phylloscopus collybita
- Green warbler, Phylloscopus nitidus (A)
- Greenish warbler, Phylloscopus trochiloides
- Arctic warbler, Phylloscopus borealis (A)
- Western crowned warbler, Phylloscopus occipitalis

== Bush warblers and allies ==
Order: Passeriformes Family: Scotocercidae

The members of this family are found throughout Africa, Asia, and Polynesia. Their taxonomy is in flux, and some authorities place some genera in other families.

- Scrub warbler, Scotocerca inquieta
- Cetti's warbler, Cettia cetti

== Long-tailed tits ==
Order: Passeriformes Family: Aegithalidae

Long-tailed tits are a group of small passerine birds with medium to long tails. They make woven bag nests in trees. Most eat a mixed diet which includes insects.

- White-browed tit-warbler, Leptopoecile sophiae
- Long-tailed tit, Aegithalos caudatus (A)

== Sylviid warblers, parrotbills, and allies ==
Order: Passeriformes Family: Sylviidae

The family Sylviidae is a group of small insectivorous passerine birds. They mainly occur as breeding species, as the common name implies, in Europe, Asia and, to a lesser extent, Africa. Most are of generally undistinguished appearance, but many have distinctive songs.

- Eurasian blackcap, Sylvia atricapilla (A)
- Garden warbler, Sylvia borin (A)
- Barred warbler, Curruca nisoria
- Lesser whitethroat, Curruca curruca
- Eastern Orphean warbler, Curruca crassirostris
- Asian desert warbler, Curruca nana
- Menetries's warbler, Curruca mystacea
- Rüppell's warbler, Curruca ruppeli (A)
- Greater whitethroat, Curruca communis

== Laughingthrushes and allies ==
Order: Passeriformes Family: Leiothrichidae

The members of this family are diverse in size and colouration, though those of genus Turdoides tend to be brown or greyish. The family is found in Africa, India, and southeast Asia.

- Streaked laughingthrush, Trochalopteron lineatum (A)

== Kinglets ==
Order: Passeriformes Family: Regulidae

The kinglets, also called crests, are a small group of birds often included in the Old World warblers, but frequently given family status because they also resemble the titmice.

- Goldcrest, Regulus regulus

== Wallcreeper ==
Order: Passeriformes Family: Tichodromidae

The wallcreeper is a small bird related to the nuthatch family, which has stunning crimson, grey and black plumage.

- Wallcreeper, Tichodroma muraria (A)

== Nuthatches ==
Order: Passeriformes Family: Sittidae

Nuthatches are small woodland birds. They have the unusual ability to climb down trees head first, unlike other birds which can only go upwards. Nuthatches have big heads, short tails and powerful bills and feet.

- Eastern rock nuthatch, Sitta tephronota

== Treecreepers ==
Order: Passeriformes Family: Certhiidae

Treecreepers are small woodland birds, brown above and white below. They have thin pointed down-curved bills, which they use to extricate insects from bark. They have stiff tail feathers, like woodpeckers, which they use to support themselves on vertical trees.

- Eurasian treecreeper, Certhia familiaris
- Bar-tailed treecreeper, Certhia himalayana (A)

== Wrens ==
Order: Passeriformes Family: Troglodytidae

The wrens are mainly small and inconspicuous except for their loud songs. These birds have short wings and thin down-turned bills. Several species often hold their tails upright. All are insectivorous.

- Eurasian wren, Troglodytes troglodytes

== Dippers ==
Order: Passeriformes Family: Cinclidae

Dippers are a group of perching birds whose habitat includes aquatic environments in the Americas, Europe and Asia. They are named for their bobbing or dipping movements.

- White-throated dipper, Cinclus cinclus (A)
- Brown dipper, Cinclus pallasii (A)

== Starlings ==
Order: Passeriformes Family: Sturnidae

Starlings are small to medium-sized passerine birds. Their flight is strong and direct and they are very gregarious. Their preferred habitat is fairly open country. They eat insects and fruit. Plumage is typically dark with a metallic sheen.

- European starling, Sturnus vulgaris
- Rosy starling, Pastor roseus
- Common myna, Acridotheres tristis

== Thrushes and allies ==
Order: Passeriformes Family: Turdidae

The thrushes are a group of passerine birds that occur mainly in the Old World. They are plump, soft plumaged, small to medium-sized insectivores or sometimes omnivores, often feeding on the ground. Many have attractive songs.

- White's thrush, Zoothera aurea (A)
- Mistle thrush, Turdus viscivorus
- Song thrush, Turdus philomelos
- Redwing, Turdus iliacus
- Eurasian blackbird, Turdus merula
- Eyebrowed thrush, Turdus obscurus (A)
- Fieldfare, Turdus pilaris
- Black-throated thrush, Turdus atrogularis
- Red-throated thrush, Turdus ruficollis (A)
- Naumann's thrush, Turdus naumanni (A)

== Old World flycatchers ==
Order: Passeriformes Family: Muscicapidae

Old World flycatchers are a large group of small passerine birds native to the Old World. They are mainly small arboreal insectivores. The appearance of these birds is highly varied, but they mostly have weak songs and harsh calls.

- Asian brown flycatcher, Muscicapa dauurica (A)
- Spotted flycatcher, Muscicapa striata
- Rufous-tailed scrub-robin, Cercotrichas galactotes
- European robin, Erithacus rubecula
- White-throated robin, Irania gutturalis
- Thrush nightingale, Luscinia luscinia (A)
- Common nightingale, Luscinia megarhynchos
- Bluethroat, Luscinia svecica
- Blue whistling-thrush, Myophonus caeruleus
- Little forktail, Enicurus scouleri (A)
- Siberian rubythroat, Calliope calliope
- Himalayan rubythroat, Calliope pectoralis
- Red-flanked bluetail, Tarsiger cyanurus (A)
- Rusty-tailed flycatcher, Ficedula ruficauda (A)
- Taiga flycatcher, Ficedula albicilla
- Red-breasted flycatcher, Ficedula parva (A)
- European pied flycatcher, Ficedula hypoleuca (A)
- Rufous-backed redstart, Phoenicurus erythronotus
- White-capped redstart, Phoenicurus leucocephalus (A)
- Blue-capped redstart, Phoenicurus coeruleocephala
- Common redstart, Phoenicurus phoenicurus
- White-winged redstart, Phoenicurus erythrogastrus
- Black redstart, Phoenicurus ochruros
- Daurian redstart, Phoenicurus auroreus (A)
- Rufous-tailed rock-thrush, Monticola saxatilis
- Blue rock-thrush, Monticola solitarius
- Whinchat, Saxicola rubetra
- White-throated bushchat, Saxicola insignis
- Siberian stonechat, Saxicola maurus
- Pied bushchat, Saxicola caprata
- Northern wheatear, Oenanthe oenanthe
- Isabelline wheatear, Oenanthe isabellina
- Desert wheatear, Oenanthe deserti
- Eastern black-eared wheatear, Oenanthe melanoleuca (A)
- Pied wheatear, Oenanthe pleschanka
- Variable wheatear, Oenanthe picata (A)
- Finsch's wheatear, Oenanthe finschii
- Kurdish wheatear, Oenanthe xanthoprymna (A)
- Persian wheatear, Oenanthe chrysopygia (A)

== Waxwings ==
Order: Passeriformes Family: Bombycillidae

The waxwings are a group of birds with soft silky plumage and unique red tips to some of the wing feathers. In the Bohemian and cedar waxwings, these tips look like sealing wax and give the group its name. These are arboreal birds of northern forests. They live on insects in summer and berries in winter.

- Bohemian waxwing, Bombycilla garrulus

== Accentors ==
Order: Passeriformes Family: Prunellidae

The accentors are in the only bird family, Prunellidae, which is completely endemic to the Palearctic. They are small, fairly drab species superficially similar to sparrows.

- Alpine accentor, Prunella collaris
- Altai accentor, Prunella himalayana
- Siberian accentor, Prunella montanella (A)
- Brown accentor, Prunella fulvescens
- Black-throated accentor, Prunella atrogularis
- Dunnock, Prunella modularis (A)

== Old World sparrows ==
Order: Passeriformes Family: Passeridae

Old World sparrows are small passerine birds. In general, sparrows tend to be small, plump, brown or grey birds with short tails and short powerful beaks. Sparrows are seed eaters, but they also consume small insects.

- Saxaul sparrow, Passer ammodendri (A)
- House sparrow, Passer domesticus
- Spanish sparrow, Passer hispaniolensis
- Zarudny's sparrow, Passer zarudnyi (A)
- Eurasian tree sparrow, Passer montanus
- Rock sparrow, Petronia petronia
- Pale rockfinch, Carpospiza brachydactyla (A)
- White-winged snowfinch, Montifringilla nivalis
- Afghan snowfinch, Montifringilla theresae

== Wagtails and pipits ==
Order: Passeriformes Family: Motacillidae

Motacillidae is a family of small passerine birds with medium to long tails. They include the wagtails, longclaws and pipits. They are slender, ground feeding insectivores of open country.

- Gray wagtail, Motacilla cinerea
- Western yellow wagtail, Motacilla flava
- Citrine wagtail, Motacilla citreola
- White wagtail, Motacilla alba
- Richard's pipit, Anthus richardi (A)
- Tawny pipit, Anthus campestris
- Meadow pipit, Anthus pratensis (A)
- Tree pipit, Anthus trivialis
- Olive-backed pipit, Anthus hodgsoni (A)
- Pechora pipit, Anthus gustavi (A)
- Red-throated pipit, Anthus cervinus
- Water pipit, Anthus spinoletta
- American pipit, Anthus rubescens (A)

== Finches, euphonias, and allies ==
Order: Passeriformes Family: Fringillidae

Finches are seed-eating passerine birds, that are small to moderately large and have a strong beak, usually conical and in some species very large. All have twelve tail feathers and nine primaries. These birds have a bouncing flight with alternating bouts of flapping and gliding on closed wings, and most sing well.

- Common chaffinch, Fringilla coelebs
- Brambling, Fringilla montifringilla
- White-winged grosbeak, Mycerobas carnipes
- Hawfinch, Coccothraustes coccothraustes
- Common rosefinch, Carpodacus erythrinus
- Red-mantled rosefinch, Carpodacus rhodochlamys (A)
- Blyth's rosefinch, Carpodacus grandis (A)
- Great rosefinch, Carpodacus rubicilla
- Long-tailed rosefinch, Carpodacus sibiricus (A)
- Red-fronted rosefinch, Carpodacus puniceus
- Pallas's rosefinch, Carpodacus roseus (A)
- Eurasian bullfinch, Pyrrhula pyrrhula (A)
- Crimson-winged finch, Rhodopechys sanguineus
- Trumpeter finch, Bucanetes githagineus
- Mongolian finch, Bucanetes mongolicus
- Plain mountain finch, Leucosticte nemoricola
- Black-headed mountain finch, Leucosticte brandti
- Desert finch, Rhodospiza obsoleta
- European greenfinch, Chloris chloris
- Twite, Linaria flavirostris
- Eurasian linnet, Linaria cannabina
- Common redpoll, Acanthis flammea
- Red crossbill, Loxia curvirostra (A)
- European goldfinch, Carduelis carduelis
- Fire-fronted serin, Serinus pusillus
- Eurasian siskin, Spinus spinus (A)

== Longspurs and snow buntings ==
Order: Passeriformes Family: Calcariidae

The Calcariidae are a group of passerine birds which had been traditionally grouped with the New World sparrows, but differ in a number of respects and are usually found in open grassy areas.

- Snow bunting, Plectrophenax nivalis (A)

== Old World buntings ==
Order: Passeriformes Family: Emberizidae

The emberizids are a large family of passerine birds. They are seed-eating birds with distinctively shaped bills. Many emberizid species have distinctive head patterns.

- Black-headed bunting, Emberiza melanocephala
- Red-headed bunting, Emberiza bruniceps
- Corn bunting, Emberiza calandra
- Chestnut-eared bunting, Emberiza fucata (A)
- Rock bunting, Emberiza cia
- Godlewski's bunting, Emberiza godlewskii (A)
- Meadow bunting, Emberiza cioides (A)
- White-capped bunting, Emberiza stewarti
- Yellowhammer, Emberiza citrinella (A)
- Pine bunting, Emberiza leucocephalos
- Gray-necked bunting, Emberiza buchanani
- Cinereous bunting, Emberiza cineracea (A)
- Ortolan bunting, Emberiza hortulana
- Pallas's bunting, Emberiza pallasi (A)
- Reed bunting, Emberiza schoeniclus
- Yellow-breasted bunting, Emberiza aureola (A)
- Little bunting, Emberiza pusilla (A)
- Rustic bunting, Emberiza rustica (A)
- Black-faced bunting, Emberiza spodocephala (A)

== See also ==
- List of birds
- Lists of birds by region
