= Ministry of Agriculture and Water Resources (Uzbekistan) =

Government ministry of Uzbekistan

Ministry of Water Resources of the Republic of Uzbekistan
- Oʻzbekiston Respublikasi Suv xo'jaligi vazirligi

Agriculture overview
- Formed: November 1996
- Jurisdiction: Government of Uzbekistan
- Headquarters: Tashkent, Karasuu str.100140 Tashkent
- Minister responsible: Shavkat Xamrayev
- Website: gov.uz/en/suvchi

The Ministry of Water Resources of the Republic of Uzbekistan Oʻzbekiston Respublikasi Suv xoʻjaligi vazirligi is a national executive body responsible for water resource management, water accounting and reporting, preparation of water balances, and oversight of compliance with rules governing water use in Uzbekistan.

The separate ministry was established on 12 February 2018 through the reorganization of the Ministry of Agriculture and Water Management. As of October 2026, the ministry is headed by Shavkat Khamrayev. Its headquarters are at 11 Qorasuv-4, Mirzo Ulugbek District, Tashkent.

== History ==
=== Predecessor institutions and the combined ministry ===
The ministry's institutional history includes the state bodies that previously administered agriculture, land reclamation and water management. On 1 November 1996, Presidential Decree No. PF-1617 established the Ministry of Agriculture and Water Management by combining the Ministry of Agriculture and the Ministry of Land Reclamation and Water Management.

The decree assigned the combined ministry responsibility for improving the productivity of irrigated land, drawing on the resources of water management organizations and research and design institutions, and pursuing a common science and technology policy for agriculture and water management. Agricultural production, irrigation and land reclamation were consequently administered within a single ministry.

Cabinet of Ministers Resolution No. 419 of 26 November 1996 set out the organizational arrangements for the combined ministry, including its central administration and institutional structure.

=== Basin-based administration ===
On 21 July 2003, Cabinet of Ministers Resolution No. 320 introduced an organizational framework based on the basin principle. It approved irrigation system basin administrations, main canal administrations and model regulations governing their activities.

The resolution listed ten irrigation system basin administrations: Norin–Qoradaryo, Norin–Sirdaryo, Sirdaryo–Soʻx, Lower Syr Darya, Chirchiq–Ohangaron, Amu–Surxon, Amu–Qashqadaryo, Amu–Buxoro, Lower Amu Darya and Zarafshon. These bodies organized water management and distribution across irrigation systems and basins.

=== Establishment of a separate ministry in 2018 ===
Presidential Decree No. PF-5330 of 12 February 2018 reorganized the Ministry of Agriculture and Water Management into two separate institutions: the Ministry of Agriculture and the Ministry of Water Resources. Responsibility for agricultural administration and water management was therefore divided between the two ministries.

Presidential Decree No. PF-5418 of 17 April 2018 provided for subsequent organizational changes. Its first paragraph expressly referred to the establishment of the two ministries under the decree of 12 February. Presidential Resolution No. PQ-3672, also adopted on 17 April, established arrangements for the operation and structure of the Ministry of Water Resources.

Reporting on the reforms, Gazeta.uz also described the establishment of a Water Management Development Fund.

=== Water Sector Development Concept, 2020–2030 ===
Presidential Decree No. PF-6024 of 10 July 2020 approved Uzbekistan's Water Sector Development Concept for 2020–2030. It set out priorities for modernizing irrigation infrastructure, improving the reclamation condition of irrigated land, expanding water-saving technologies and reforming water resource management.

The concept included targets to increase irrigation system efficiency from 0.63 to 0.73 and to expand the area using water-saving irrigation technologies to 2 million hectares by 2030. These figures were planning targets specified in the concept.

=== Administrative reforms in 2023–2024 ===
Presidential Decree No. PF-101 of 20 June 2023 set out organizational changes and priorities for the ministry within wider administrative reforms. It addressed the safety of water management facilities, oversight of water use and the financing of organizations in the ministry's system.

Presidential Decree No. PF-74 of 7 May 2024 designated the ministry as the state body responsible for maintaining a unified water balance covering all sources and coordinating work on the State Water Cadastre. The decree established a management framework comprising upper, intermediate and local levels, with responsibilities assigned to each.

The Agency for the Operation of Water Management Facilities and the Department for the Implementation of Water Management Projects were established within the ministry's structure as separate legal entities.

Cabinet of Ministers Resolution No. 645 of 7 October 2024 approved regulations governing the ministry and organizations within its system. The regulations on the ministry appear in Annex 1, and those governing the agency in Annex 2.

=== Water Code and digitalization ===
Law No. O‘RQ-1076 of 30 July 2025 approved Uzbekistan's Water Code. The law entered into force on 31 October 2025, replacing the earlier Law on Water and Water Use as the principal legislation governing water relations.

Presidential Decree No. PF-183 of 13 October 2025 addressed digitalization and sustainable development in the water sector. It established the Center for Sustainable Development in the Water Sector and abolished the Center for Reforms in Water Management.

The decree recorded the development and introduction of the water management situation center and the Suv hisobi, Nasos stansiyalari, Tomchi Yer, Smartwater and Raqamli suv xoʻjaligi systems. It assigned the Digitalization and Monitoring Center responsibilities for integrating sector information systems and digitalizing water and electricity accounting.

== Legal status and responsibilities ==
The ministry operates under Uzbekistan's Constitution, legislation, presidential and government acts, and its institutional regulations. The regulations approved in 2024 define its powers, responsibilities, management arrangements and reporting procedures.

Its main areas of responsibility include:

- managing water resources and preparing water accounts and balances;
- taking account of water demand from economic sectors, the population and the environment;
- developing irrigation and land reclamation infrastructure;
- ensuring the safety and reliable operation of hydraulic structures;
- introducing water-saving technologies and digital accounting systems;
- improving electricity efficiency in the water sector;
- developing public–private partnerships and market mechanisms;
- cooperating internationally on transboundary water resources; and
- supporting professional training and the practical application of research.

The ministry also prepares a unified water balance, sets water abstraction limits and develops sector programs. Its functions include reviewing water management projects, supporting water-saving technologies and facilitating cooperation between water management organizations and research and educational institutions.

== Organizational structure ==
As of October 2026, the ministry's website listed the following subordinate organizations:

- Agency for the Operation of Water Management Facilities;
- Department for the Implementation of Water Management Projects;
- Inspectorate for the Safety of Water Management Facilities and Control of Water Use;
- Center for Digitalization and Monitoring of Water Management;
- Center for Sustainable Development in the Water Sector;
- Center for the Implementation of Foreign Investment Projects in Water Management;
- state institution for the introduction of market mechanisms in water management; and
- Research Institute of Irrigation and Water Problems.

Within the management framework, the ministry's central administration handles policy and coordination, while the agency is responsible for water delivery and the operation of facilities. Local state institutions known as water delivery services supply water to consumers, maintain irrigation networks and keep water accounts.

== Leadership ==
Shavkat Khamrayev has headed the separate Ministry of Water Resources since February 2018. As of October 2026, the ministry's official website listed the following leadership:

Position	Officeholder
Minister	Shavkat Khamrayev
First deputy minister and director of the Agency for the Operation of Water Management Facilities	Zokir Ishpulatov
Deputy minister	Oʻtkir Sheraliyev
Deputy minister	Rustam Qarshiyev
Deputy minister	Mirolimjon Karimov

In October 2025, the appointments of Zokir Ishpulatov as first deputy minister and agency director, and Mirolimjon Karimov as deputy minister, were announced.

== International cooperation and projects ==
The ministry participates in transboundary water resource management, coordination with neighboring countries on water use, and irrigation projects undertaken with international financial institutions.

In May 2025, the World Bank announced approval of US$200 million in concessional financing to modernize irrigation and drainage infrastructure in Uzbekistan and improve irrigation services. The project aims to reduce water losses and improve energy efficiency.

A World Bank feature published on 2 September 2026 described the second phase of the Ferghana Valley Water Resources Management Project, implemented by the ministry. It reported that the Avval–Logon pumping station was commissioned in 2025 and that 13 pumping facilities were modernized under the project. Financing included a US$131.4 million credit from the International Development Association, a US$18 million grant from the Government of Uzbekistan, and a €12.9 million grant from the European Union.
