= Akrom Yusupov =

People's Artist of the Uzbek SSR

Akrom Mamat oʻgʻli Yusupov
- Born: May 1, 1905; Kuva, Uzbekistan
- Died: November 26, 1975 (aged 70); Tashkent, Uzbek SSR
- Occupations: Circus artist, clown
- Years active: 1919-1975
- Known for: His comic talent and his performances with trained animals
- Notable work: Films: ISH-421, Diplomaed Donkey, Money or Wisdom, Student, Barber, Inspection, Boxing, Smart Creature. Pantomimes: The Mysterious Crystal, Akrom, Bad-Khan and Rabbit.

Akrom Mamatovich Yusupov (May 1, 1905, Kuva — November 26, 1975, Tashkent) - Soviet, Uzbek circus artist, clown. He was awarded the title People's Artist of the Uzbek SSR in 1961.

== Biography ==
He was born in a poor family of a baker Mamat Yusupov. It was hard for his father to feed nine children, and at the age of 8 Akram became an assistant to his uncle, a tightrope walker Khatam Madaliev. Dorvoz Khatam Mamadaliyev earned money with this ancient art ("dorvoz" - tightrope walker), until one day he fell from a height and broke. Akram Yusupov recalled that in the old days, unfortunately, tightrope walkers did not use any insurance.

Before the revolution of 1917, Akrom Yusupov could not even dream of studying, only after the establishment of Soviet power in Central Asia the boy got the opportunity to study.

From the age of 14, Akrom Yusupov worked in a troupe of folk circus artists. In 1920-30 he participated in comedy acrobatics, exercises on the horizontal bar, horse riding. Since 1942 he participated in the program of the Uzbek circus collective "Tashkenbaevs" and was widely known as a clown. In the field of clowning, he worked since 1953, continuing and developing the ancient traditions of clowning, creating the best examples of modern Uzbek clowning. Yusupov’s performances involved trained donkeys and sheep.

Circus building in Tashkent

The circus building in Tashkent Yusupov embodied the image of a modern Khodja Nasreddin, and in the image of a cheerful and witty hero, he showed his comic talent in the films "ISH-421", "Diplomaed Donkey", "Money or Wisdom", "Student", "Barber", "Inspection", "Boxing", "Smart Creature". He starred in circus pantomimes, such as "The Mysterious Crystal", "Akrom, Bad-Khan and Rabbit". Since the 1970s, he worked with the creative team "Circus on Stage" in Tashkent. The audience admired his skill as a parodist and a dashing rider. Akrom Yusupov was a master of words and mimicry. He created the image of a simple and sincere person, quick, but calm, when it was necessary to quickly assess the situation. His characters were distinguished by ingenuity, although they made people laugh.

In 1958, for his great labor merits, Akrom Yusupov was awarded the Order of the "Badge of Honor".

His son Mahmud Yusupov (December 11, 1930, Tashkent) - tightrope walker and acrobat. Honored Artist of Uzbekistan (1964), participant of the famous program of the circus dynasty Tashkenbaevs since 1951.

He died on November 26, 1975, buried in the cemetery "Minor" in the city of Tashkent.

One of the streets of the city of Markhamat Andijan region of Uzbekistan is named after Akrom Yusupov.

== Awards ==
- Order of the Badge of Honour (9 October 1958)
- Honored artist of Uzbek SSR (1954)
- People's artist of Uzbek SSR (1961)
