= Government of Uzbekistan =

Government of the Republic of Uzbekistan
- Emblem of Uzbekistan

Government overview
- Formed: 1 September 1991
- Preceding Government: Council of Minister of the Republic of Uzbekistan
- Jurisdiction: Uzbekistan
- Employees: approx: 6, 300, 000
- Annual budget: $33.7 billion
- Minister responsible: Abdulla Aripov, Prime Minister
- Website: gov.uz

The Government of the Republic of Uzbekistan (Uzbek: Özbekiston Respublikasining Hukumati) exercises executive power in the Republic of Uzbekistan. The members of the government are the President of Uzbekistan, Prime Minister of Uzbekistan, Ministers, and Deputy Ministers. It has its legal basis in the Constitution of Uzbekistan. The Cabinet of Ministers of Uzbekistan is the executive power body of the Republic of Uzbekistan, ensuring guidance over effective functioning of the economy, social and cultural development, execution of the laws, and other decisions of the Oliy Majlis, the Uzbek parliament, as well as decrees and resolutions issued by the President of the Republic of Uzbekistan.

== Overview ==
The Republic of Uzbekistan is a presidential constitutional republic, whereby the President of Uzbekistan is both head of state and head of government. Executive power is exercised by the government. Legislative power is vested in the two chambers of the Supreme Assembly, the Senate and the Legislative Chamber. The judicial branch (or judiciary), is composed of the Supreme Court, Constitutional Court, and Higher Economic Court that exercises judicial power.

The movement toward economic reform in Uzbekistan has not been matched by movement toward political reform. The government of Uzbekistan has instead tightened its grip since independence (September 1, 1991), cracking down increasingly on opposition groups. Although the names have changed, the institutions of government remain similar to those that existed before the breakup of the Soviet Union. The government has justified its restraint of public assembly, opposition parties, and the media by emphasizing the need for stability and a gradual approach to change during the transitional period, citing the conflict and chaos in the other former republics (most convincingly, neighboring Tajikistan). This approach has found credence among a large share of Uzbekistan's population, although such a position may not be sustainable in the long run.

Despite the trappings of institutional change, the first years of independence saw more resistance than acceptance of the institutional changes required for democratic reform to take hold. Whatever initial movement toward democracy existed in Uzbekistan in the early days of independence seems to have been overcome by the inertia of the remaining Soviet-style strong centralized leadership.

== The Cabinet ==
The Cabinet of Ministers of Uzbekistan (Uzbek: Özbekiston Respublikasi Vazirlar Mahkamasi) is the country's executive body, ensuring the effective functioning of the economy, social and spiritual spheres, and the implementation of laws, other decisions of the Oliy Majlis, and presidential decrees and orders. The Cabinet of Ministers operates on the basis of the Law "On the Cabinet of Ministers of the Republic of Uzbekistan" adopted on September 30, 2019 (latest version; the original version was adopted on August 29, 2003).

The Cabinet of Ministers heads the system of state administration bodies and the economic management bodies it creates, ensuring their coordinated activities. The Cabinet of Ministers is accountable to the President and the Oliy Majlis (the bicameral parliament) of Uzbekistan. Resolutions and orders of the Cabinet of Ministers are personally signed by the Prime Minister of Uzbekistan, as the head of government.
