= List of Uzbek dishes =

This is a list of notable Uzbek dishes and foods. Uzbek cuisine is the cuisine of Uzbekistan. The cuisine is influenced by local agriculture such as grain farming. Breads and noodles are a significant part of the cuisine, and Uzbek cuisine has been characterized as "noodle-rich". Mutton is a popular variety of meat due to the abundance of sheep in the country, and it is used in various Uzbek dishes. The ingredients used vary by season. For example, in the winter, dried abdimueed jamas, fruits and vegetables, noodles and preserves are prominent, while in the summer vegetables, fruits (particularly melon) and nuts are more prominent. Bread (nan, obi non) has a prominent role in Uzbek cuisine, and is influenced by pre-Islamic traditions. In Uzbek culture, elders are typically served food first, as a sign of respect towards them.

== Uzbek dishes and foods ==
- Plov (also spelled palov and sometimes called osh) is a traditional rice dish considered the national dish of Uzbekistan.
- Mastava (Cyrillic: Мастава) is a type of soup, a traditional Uzbek dish. Sometimes it is also called liquid pilaf.
- Nisholda, also spelled as nishallo, nishaldo, or nisholda (Persian: نشلا; Bukharian dialect: Нишалло; Tajik: Нишолло; Uzbek: Nisholda) is a sweet dish that resembles white jam, only thicker.
- Ijjon – An Uzbek dish made with raw meat, similar to steak tartare, and widely consumed in Khiva, Khorazm Region.
- Dimlama – An Uzbek stew prepared with various combinations of meat, potatoes, onions, vegetables, and sometimes fruits. Meat (mutton or beef) and vegetables are cut into large pieces and placed in layers in a tightly sealed pot to simmer slowly in their own juices.
- Meats include mutton, beef, poultry, goat meat, camel meat and horse meat (such as horse meat sausage)
- Melons (qovun), such as watermelon, are a prominent part of Uzbek cuisine. Qovun means "melon", and may refer to a melon that has an elongated shape, which has been described as "exceptionally sweet and succulent." Melons are often served as a dessert.
- Naryn – a pasta dish made with fresh hand-rolled noodles and horse meat.
- Noodle-based dishes
- Fried nuts and almonds
- Obi non – also called patyr; and nan, a bread that is a staple food in Uzbek cuisine. It is formed into large discs and cooked. Tradition holds that the bread is always placed flat side up (rather than upside-down), and never cut with a knife. Non is a significant part of Uzbek cuisine, and is influenced by pre-Islamic traditions. It is typically prepared in tandir ovens. Styles of non can vary by region.
- Oshi toki – stuffed grape leaves
- Rice dishes
- Shakarap – a salad prepared with tomato, onion, salt and pepper Some versions use a pumpkin filling during autumn.
- Sumalak – sweet paste made entirely from germinated wheat (young wheatgrass)
- Suzma – clotted milk that is strained, forming curds
- Tirit – prepared to avoid wasting dry bread, it is prepared with the broth of offal and cutting dry bread and adding ground pepper and onion.
- Yogurt soup – yogurt soup cooked with a variety of herbs, rice and sometimes chickpeas.
- Manty is a popular steamed dumpling filled with meat. Beef, lamb and potatoes are the most common fillings.

== Beverages ==
- Green tea (kok choy) is typically served without sugar or milk, and is often consumed in teahouses, known as choyxonas.
- Soft drinks

=== Alcoholic beverages ===
- Beer
- Champagne
- Cognac
- Vodka – is the most popular alcoholic beverage, and is typically drunk straight (sans dilution or mixer).
- Wine

== Desserts ==
- Candies
- Fresh or dried fruit

- Melons

- Halvah (lavz) – in Uzbekistan and Tajikistan, soft sesame halva is made from sugar syrup, egg whites, and sesame seeds. Solid sesame halva is made from pulled sugar, repeatedly stretched to give a white color, and prepared sesame is added to the warm sugar and formed on trays.

== See also ==
- Agriculture in Uzbekistan
- Central Asian cuisine
- Kazan (cookware)
- Outline of Uzbekistan
- Soviet cuisine
