= Culture of Uzbekistan =

The culture of Uzbekistan has a wide mix of ethnic groups and cultures, with the Uzbeks being the majority group. In 1995, approximately 71.5% of Uzbekistan's population was Uzbek. The chief minority groups were Russians (8.4%), Tajiks (officially 5%, but believed to be 10%), Kazakhs (4.1%), Tatars (2.4%), and Karakalpaks (2.1%). Other minority groups include Armenians and the Koryo-saram. It is said, however, that the number of non‑indigenous people living in Uzbekistan is decreasing, as Russians and other minority groups slowly leave and Uzbeks return from other parts of the former Soviet Union.

== Heritage ==
Cultural heritage sites in Uzbekistan inscribed on the UNESCO World Heritage List include:

- Historic Centre of Bukhara (1993)
- Historic Centre of Shakhrisabz (2000)
- Itchan Kala (1990)
- Samarkand – Crossroads of Cultures (2001)
- Silk Roads: Zarafshan-Karakum Corridor (2023)

== Religion ==
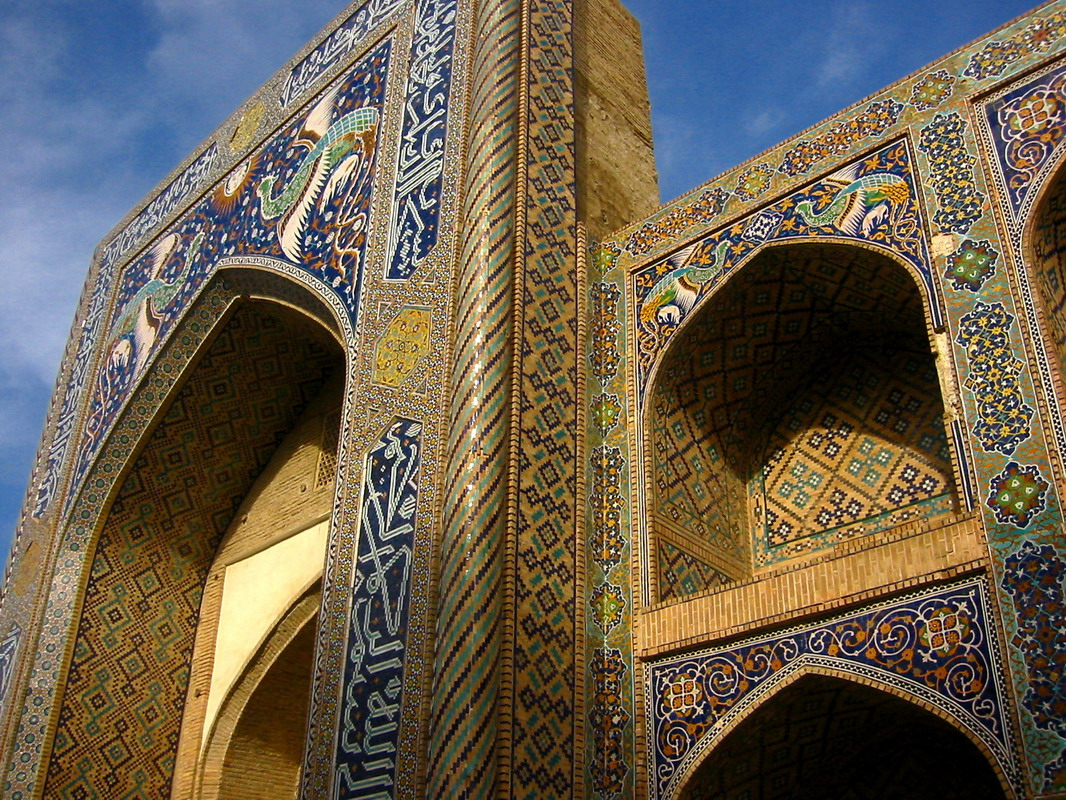
Nadir Devanbegi Madrasah, Bukhara, Uzbekistan

When Uzbekistan gained independence in 1991, it was widely believed that Muslim fundamentalism would spread across the region. The expectation was that an Islamic country long denied freedom of religious practice would undergo a very rapid increase in the expression of its dominant faith. In 1994, more than half of Uzbeks were said to belong to Islam, though in an official survey few of that number had any real knowledge of the religion or knew how to practise it.

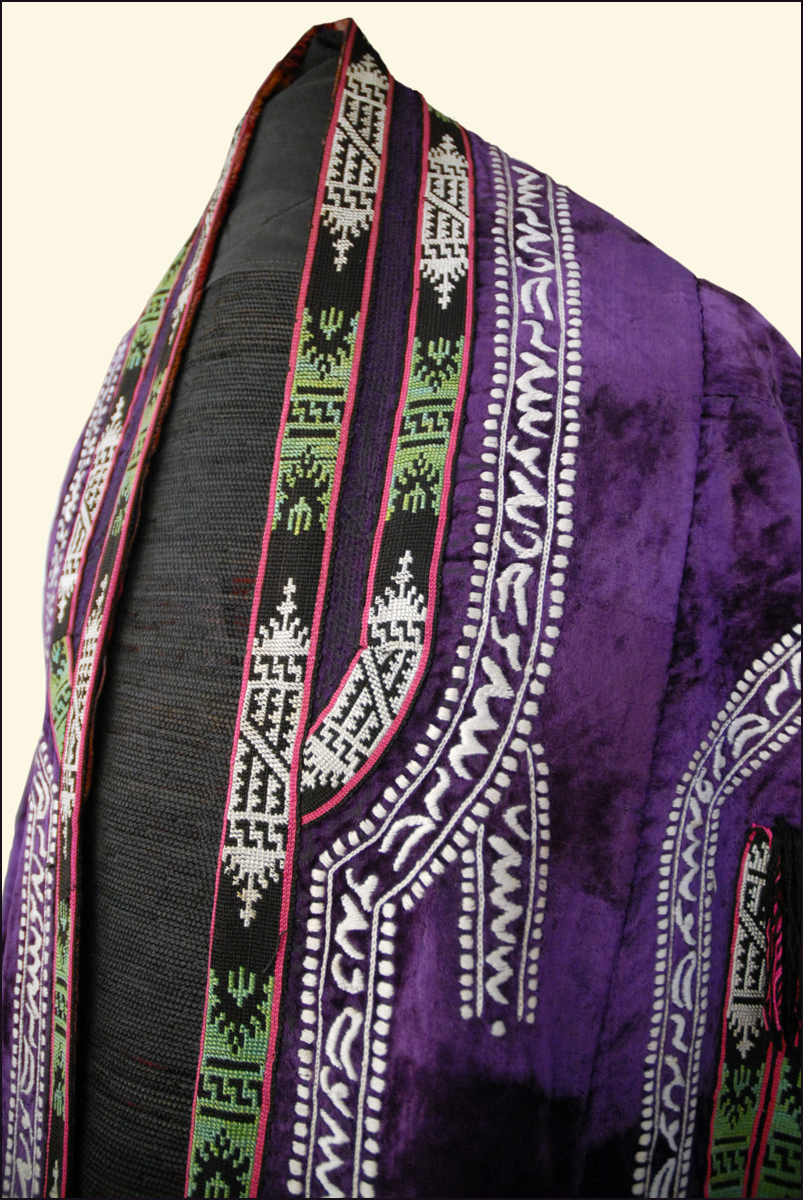
A parandja, a robe worn by women until it was banned in 1927. This example is made of velvet, silk threads, and handmade embroidery. Displayed at the Museum of Applied Arts in Tashkent, Uzbekistan.

== Education ==
Uzbekistan has a high literacy rate, with approximately 98% of adults over the age of 15 able to read and write. However, with only 76% of the under‑15 population currently enrolled in education, this figure may decline in the future. Uzbekistan has encountered severe budgetary shortfalls in its education programme. The Education Law of 1992 began the process of theoretical reform, but the physical infrastructure has deteriorated, and curriculum revision has been slow.

== Traditions ==
Uzbeks celebrate the New Year in a celebration called Yangi Yil. They decorate a New Year tree, celebrate New Year's Eve, and exchange gifts. They sing and listen to traditional Uzbek music while having dinner, after which a man dressed as Santa Claus and Father Time arrives and continues the celebration. At midnight, they sing the State Anthem of Uzbekistan to welcome the new year and continue celebrating. Moreover, the most popular holiday for Uzbeks is Nowruz, which is considered the most historically significant. Colourful traditional costumes and a variety of dishes on the laid table form the main pattern of the holiday. However, the main course is Sumalak, which must be boiled throughout the night.

== Cuisine ==
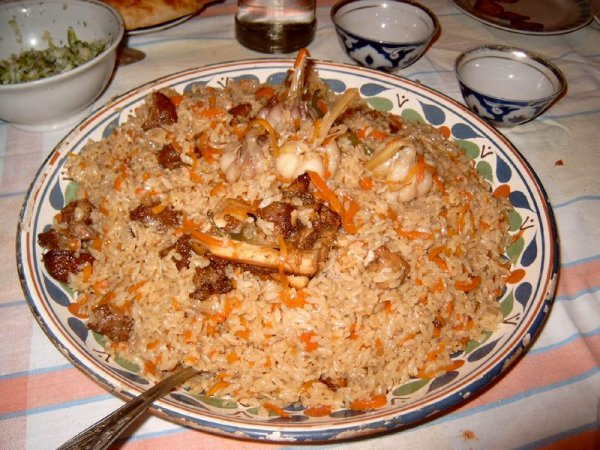
Palov, the national dish in Uzbekistan

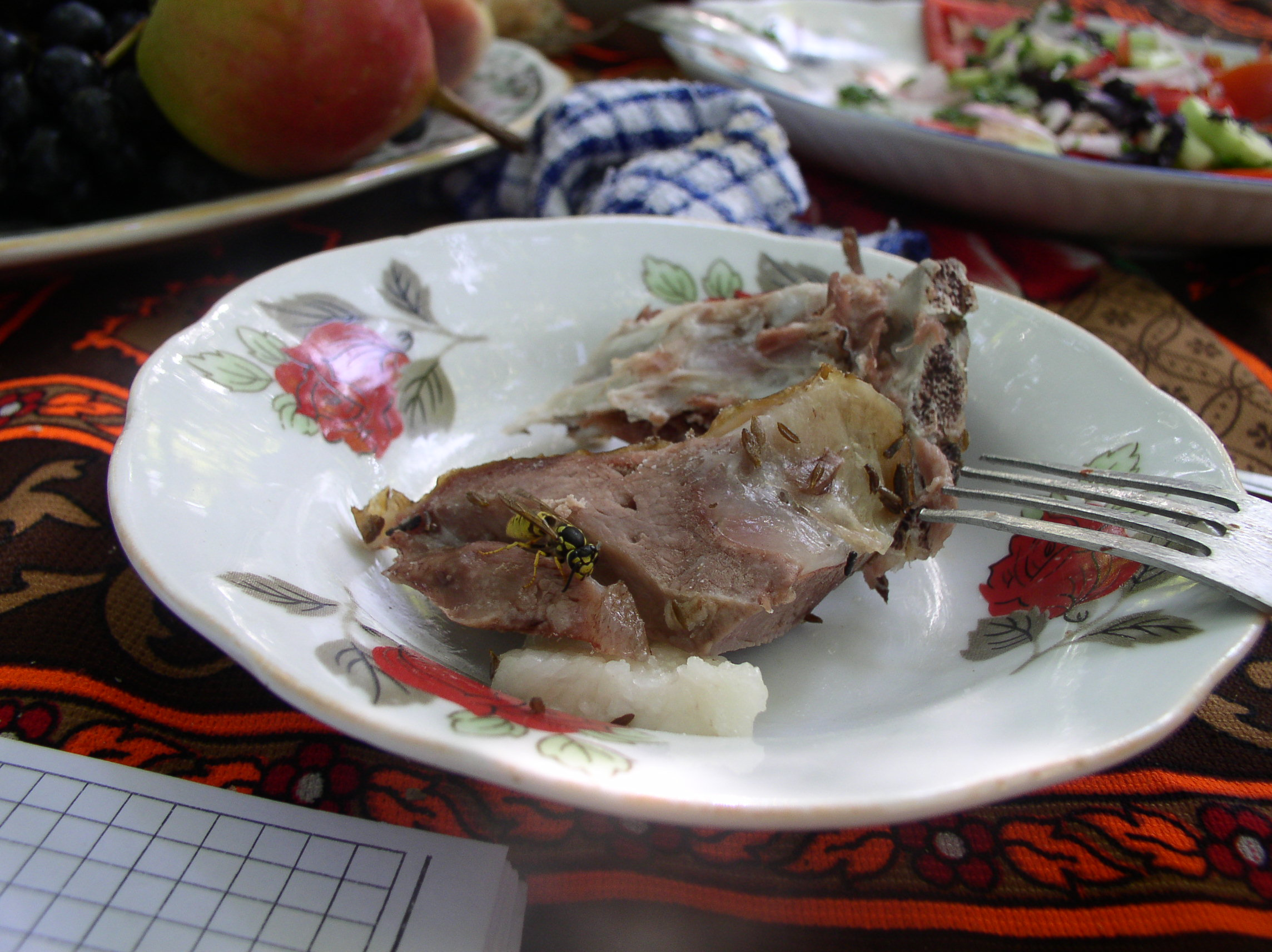
Tandir Kabob – Mutton prepared in the tandir oven

Uzbek cuisine is influenced by local agriculture, as in most nations. There is a great deal of grain farming in Uzbekistan, so breads and noodles are of importance, and Uzbek cuisine has been characterised as 'noodle‑rich'. Mutton is a popular meat owing to the abundance of sheep in the country, and it features in various Uzbek dishes.

Uzbekistan's signature dish is palov (plov or osh), a main course typically made with rice, pieces of meat, and grated carrots and onions. Oshi Nahor, or 'Morning Plov', is served in the early morning (between 6 and 9 am) to large gatherings of guests, typically as part of an ongoing wedding celebration. Other notable national dishes include: shurpa (shurva or shorva), a soup made of large pieces of fatty meat (usually mutton) and vegetables; norin and lagman, noodle‑based dishes that may be served as a soup or a main course; manti, chuchvara, and somsa, stuffed pockets of dough served as an appetiser or a main course; dimlama (a meat and vegetable stew); and various kebabs, usually served as a main course.

Green tea is the national hot beverage, consumed throughout the day; teahouses (chaikhanas) are of cultural importance. The more usual black tea is preferred in Tashkent. Both green and black teas are typically taken without milk or sugar. Tea always accompanies a meal, but it is also a drink of hospitality, automatically offered to every guest. Ayran, a chilled yoghurt drink, is popular in summer, but it does not replace hot tea.

The use of alcohol is less widespread than in the West, but wine is comparatively popular for a Muslim nation, as Uzbekistan is largely secular. Uzbekistan has 14 wineries, the oldest and most famous being the Khovrenko Winery in Samarkand (est. 1927). The Samarkand Winery produces a range of dessert wines from local grape varieties: Gulyakandoz, Shirin, Aleatiko, and Kabernet likernoe (literally 'Cabernet dessert wine' in Russian). Uzbek wines have received international awards and are exported to Russia and other countries in Central Asia.

The choice of desserts in Bukharan Jewish and Uzbek cuisines is limited. A typical festive meal ends with fruit or a compote of fresh or dried fruit, followed by nuts and halva with green tea. A Bukharan Jewish speciality for guests on a Shabbat afternoon is Chai Kaymoki – green tea mixed, contrary to standard Uzbek practice, with a generous measure of milk (in 1:1 proportions) and a tablespoon of butter in the teapot. Before serving, the tea is sometimes sprinkled with chopped almonds or walnuts.

== Sport ==
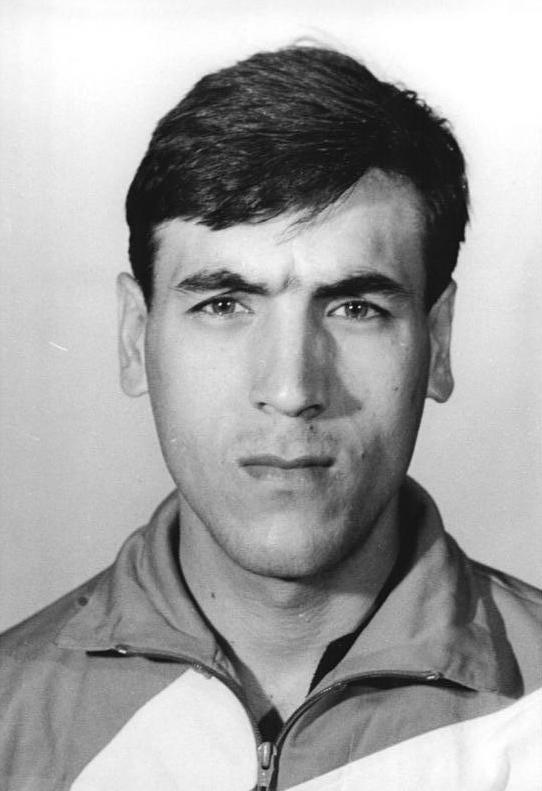
Djamolidine Abdoujaparov is the most famous cyclist in Uzbekistan, having won three Tour de France points classifications. Abdoujaparov is also one of the world's fastest cyclists.

Uzbekistan is home to former racing cyclist Djamolidine Abdoujaparov. Abdoujaparov has won the points classification in the Tour de France three times, each time claiming the coveted green jersey, which is second only to the yellow jersey. Abdoujaparov was a specialist at winning stages in tours or one‑day races when the bunch or peloton would finish together. He would often sprint in the final kilometre and had a reputation for being dangerous in these bunch sprints, as he would weave side to side. This reputation earned him the nickname 'The Terror of Tashkent'. Artur Taymazov won Uzbekistan's first wrestling medal at the 2000 Summer Olympics, as well as two gold medals at both the 2004 and 2008 Summer Olympics in the men's 120 kg event.

Ruslan Chagaev is a professional boxer representing Uzbekistan in the WBA. He won the WBA champion title in 2007 after defeating the Russian Nikolai Valuev. Chagaev defended his title twice before losing it to Wladimir Klitschko in 2009.

Uzbekistan is the home of the International Kurash Association. Kurash is an internationalised and modernised form of the traditional Uzbek fighting art of Kurash.

Football is the most popular sport in Uzbekistan. Uzbekistan's premier football league is the Uzbek League, which features 16 teams. The current champions are FC Bunyodkor, and the team with the most championships is FC Pakhtakor Tashkent with eight. The current player of the year (2010) is Server Djeparov. Uzbekistan regularly participates in the AFC Champions League and the AFC Cup. Nasaf won the AFC Cup in 2011, which was the first international club cup for Uzbek football.

Before Uzbekistan's independence in 1991, the country was part of the Soviet Union's football, rugby union, ice hockey, basketball, and handball national teams. After gaining independence, Uzbekistan established its own football, rugby union, and futsal national teams.

Other popular sports in Uzbekistan include rugby union, handball, baseball, ice hockey, basketball, and futsal.

== See also ==
- Islam in Uzbekistan
- Christianity in Uzbekistan
- Cinema of Uzbekistan
- Music of Uzbekistan
- Scout Association of Uzbekistan
- Public holidays in Uzbekistan
- Zarlik and Munglik (Uzbek folktale)
- Chötiktscha (Uzbek folktale)
- Oʻzbek xalq ijodi
