= Uzbek cuisine =

Culinary traditions of Uzbekistan

The cuisine of Uzbekistan, also known as Uzbek cuisine, encompasses all traditional and modern cuisines of Uzbekistan. It shares the culinary traditions of peoples across Central Asia. Grain farming is widespread in Uzbekistan, making breads and noodles an important part of the cuisine, which has been described as 'noodle‑rich'.

== Description ==
Bread (nan or non) is baked in a tandur, which is frequently a pot rather than the deep pit or oven of India and Afghanistan. Many varieties of rice are eaten. Potatoes were introduced by the Soviets, and some elder Uzbeks still refuse to eat them.

The most popular meat is mutton. Beef is common, and goat is eaten only rarely. Horse meat is used as well; there are sausages made of horse meat, as is the case with many other Turkic peoples. Karakul sheep provide meat but also fat, particularly the fat from the tail end, called qurdiuq.

Uzbekistan's signature dish is plov (or osh or palov, "pilaf"), a main course consisting of rice, chunks of meat, grated carrots and onions. It is cooked in a kazan (or deghi) over an open fire. Chickpeas, raisins, barberries, or fruit may be added for variation.

Although often prepared at home for family and guests by the head of household or the housewife, palov is made on special occasions by the oshpaz, or the osh master chef, who cooks the dish over an open flame, sometimes serving up to 1,000 people from a single cauldron on holidays or occasions such as weddings. Nahor oshi, or "morning plov", is served in the early morning (between 6 and 9 am) to large gatherings of guests, typically as part of a wedding celebration.

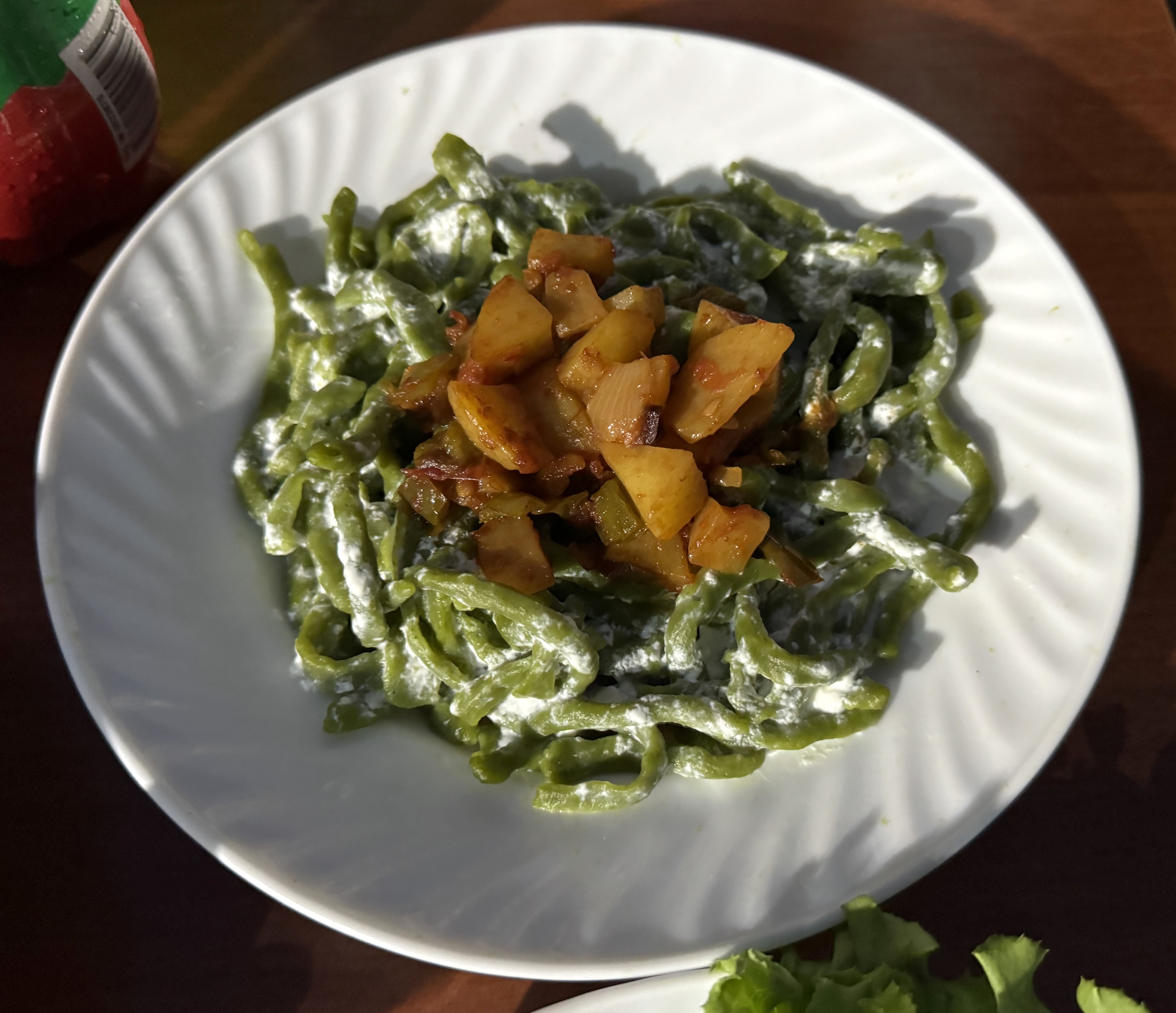
Shivit oshi

Other national dishes include shurpa (shurva or shorva), a soup made of large pieces of fatty meat (usually mutton) and fresh vegetables; norin and lagman, noodle-based dishes that may be served as a soup or a main course; manti (also called qasqoni), chuchvara, and somsa, stuffed pockets of dough served as an appetizer or a main course (ranging from "wonderfully flaky and rich" to "heavy, stodgy"); dimlama (a meat and vegetable stew) and various kebabs, usually served as a main course.

Green tea is the national hot beverage taken throughout the day; teahouses (chaikhanas) are of cultural importance. Black tea is preferred in Tashkent. Both are taken without milk or sugar. Tea always accompanies a meal, but it is also a drink of hospitality, automatically offered green or black to every guest. Ayran, a chilled yogurt drink, is popular in the summer.

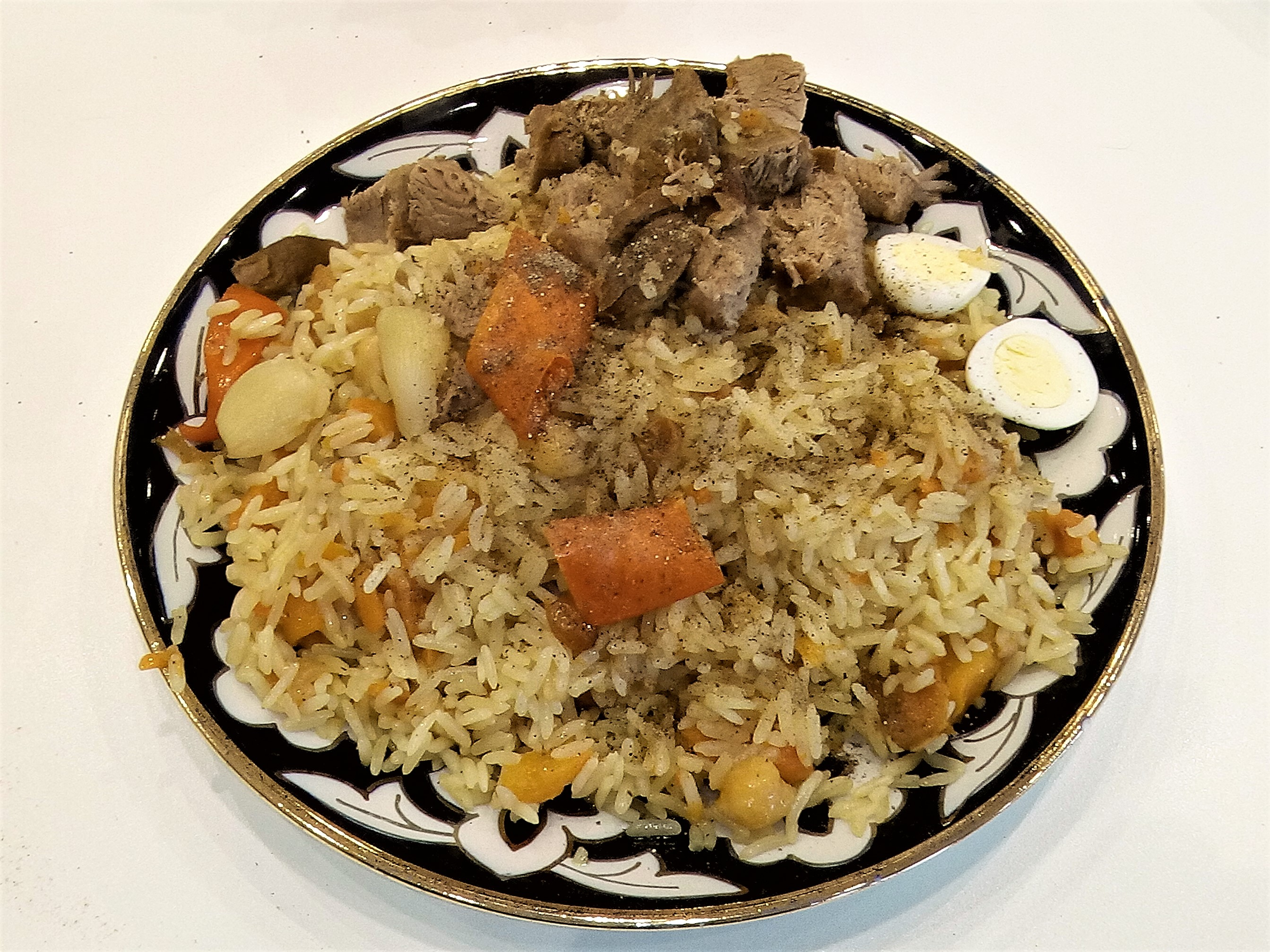
Palov (or osh)

The use of alcohol is less widespread than in the West. Uzbekistan has 14 wineries, the oldest and most famous being the Khovrenko Winery in Samarkand (est. 1927). The Samarkand Winery produces a range of dessert wines from local grape varieties: Gulyakandoz, Shirin, Aleatiko, and Kabernet likernoe (literally Cabernet dessert wine in Russian). Uzbek wines have received international awards and are exported to Russia and other countries in Central Asia.

A festive meal ends with fruit or a compote of fresh or dried fruit, followed by nuts and halvah with green tea.

== Dishes and foods ==
=== Plov ===
Plov (also known as palov or osh) is considered to be the national dish of Uzbekistan, with numerous variations across the country. Its tradition and culture are recognized by UNESCO on the Representative List of the Intangible Cultural Heritage of Humanity. According to UNESCO, large-scale communal plov that are cooked in oversized kazan cauldrons, are typically prepared by men, while the women tend to only cook plov at home for their families. Specialists that prepare this dish are called "oshpaz", and their skills are passed down from masters to apprentices, over generations. There is a tradition where elders start to eat first, before others follow.

The basis is meat, usually mutton, with vegetables (carrots and onions), fried in qurdiuq (fat from the fat-tailed sheep). The mixture of onion and thinly cut carrot is called zirvak, and it is compared to European soffrito. Often garbanzos and raisins are added, and instead of mutton all kinds of other basic ingredients can be used, including stuffed grape leaves or poultry.

The meat is either boiled or fried with the zirvak. The rice is cooked by being soaked and then placed on top of the other ingredients, so it steams—in contrast to other popular ways of making pilaf, where rice is fried, and the other ingredients added, and then the entire dish being cooked in water.

- Oshi toki – stuffed grape leaves, similar to dolma, usually served as a cold appetizer.

=== Breads ===
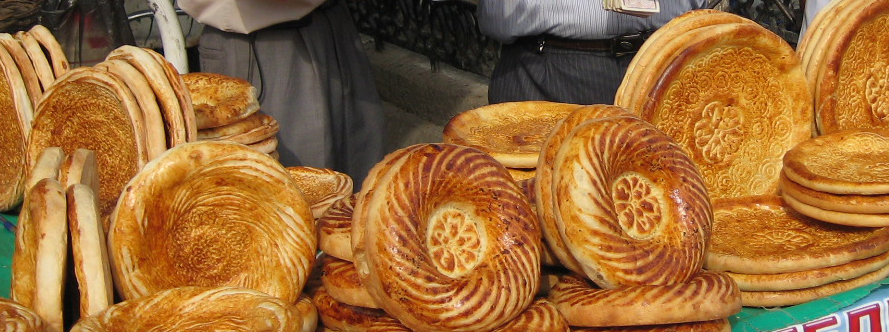
A selection of non

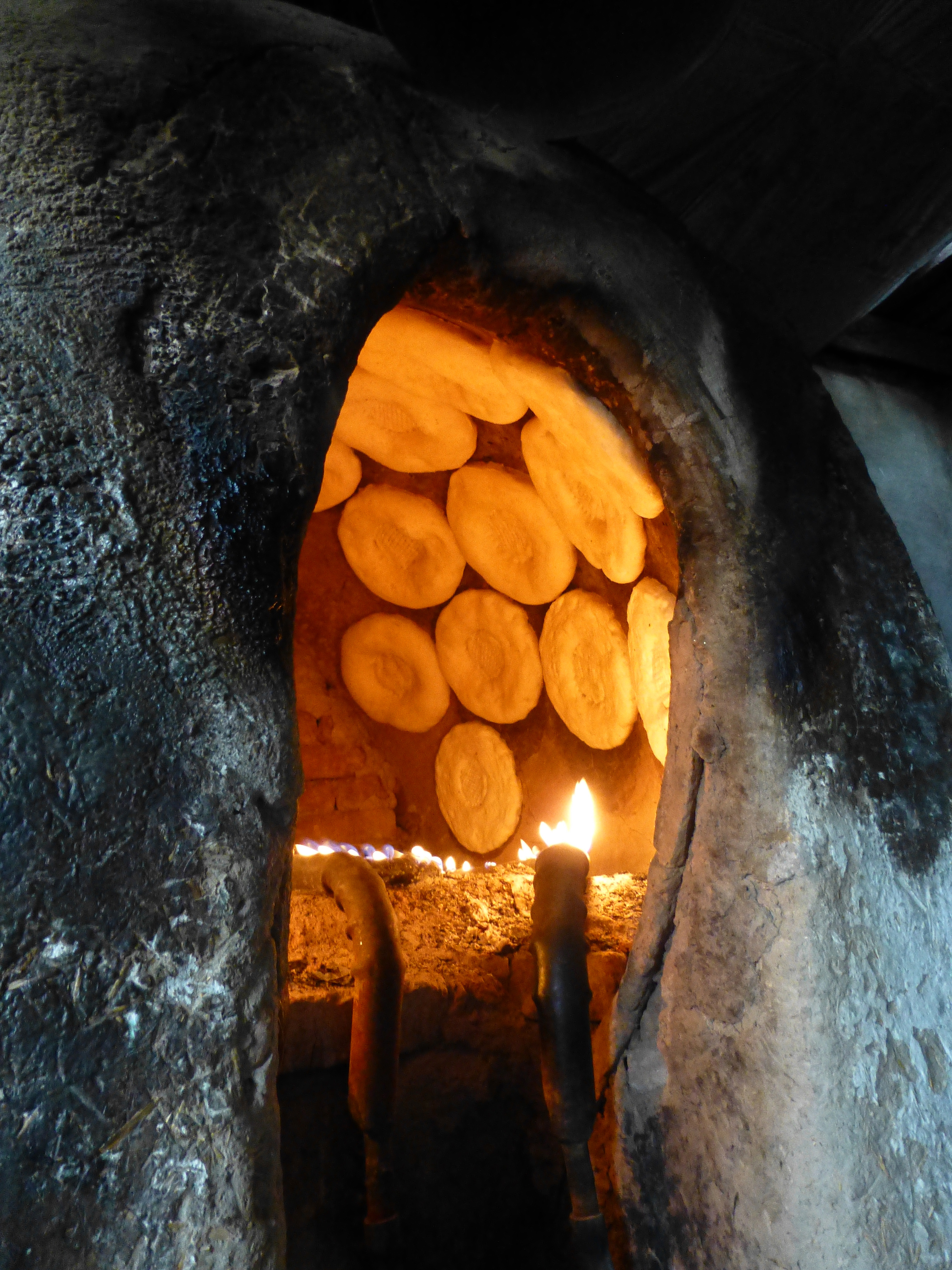
Bread baking in Samarkand

Traditional Uzbek bread, called generically non or patir, is baked in the form of circular flat loaves (flatbread) with a thin decorated depression at the center and a thicker rim all around. The decoration is made with a special round stamp called by the Turkish word çekiç (chekich). It is made of wood and the pattern is usually made of nails. Nons are brought to the table with the decorated side up, then torn into irregular chunks which are stacked on the bread plate. In Uzbek society, bread is an important cultural element, associated with various elements of etiquette, hospitality culture, practices, and beliefs.

Every region has different varieties of non, most prominent are:

- Obi non is the staple bread of Uzbek cuisine. Obi nons are mentioned in one of the oldest written works, the Epic of Gilgamesh. Obi nons are baked in clay ovens called tandir.
- Samarkand non. In different areas of Uzbekistan, obi non is baked in different ways. In Samarkand, small thick obi nons, the shirma nons are the most popular.
- Bukhara obi non sprinkled with sesame or nigella, making a delicate aroma.
- Wedding patir (flaky obi non) from Andijon and Qashqadaryo. According to ancient traditions, this aromatic bread prepared with cream and butter was served during matchmaking meetings.
- Tashkent lochira, plate-formed obi non, baked from short pastry (milk, butter, and sugar). Jirish non is specially prepared bread from flour mixed with wheat. Nomadic tribes did not make tandirs because of their way of living, but cooked bread on butter in kazans (cauldrons), preparing the dough on a milk base.

=== Bukharan Jewish cuisine ===
The cooking of Bukharan Jews forms a distinct cuisine within Uzbekistan, subject to the restrictions of Jewish dietary laws. The most typical Bukharan Jewish dish is oshi sabo (also osh savo or osovoh), a "meal in a pot" slowly cooked overnight and eaten hot for Shabbat lunch. Oshi sabo is made with meat, rice, vegetables, and fruit added for a unique sweet and sour taste. By virtue of its culinary function (a hot Shabbat meal in Jewish homes) and ingredients (rice, meat, vegetables cooked together overnight), oshi sabo is a Bukharan version of cholent or hamin.

In addition to oshi sabo, authentic Bukharian Jewish dishes include:

- Osh palov – a Bukharian Jewish version of palov for weekdays, includes both beef and chicken.
- Bakhsh – "green palov", rice with meat or chicken and green herbs (coriander, parsley, dill), exists in two varieties; bakhshi khaltagi cooked Jewish-style in a small bag immersed in a pot with boiling water or soup and bakhshi degi cooked like regular palov in a cauldron; bakhshi khaltagi is precooked and therefore can be served on Shabbat.
- Khalta savo – food cooked in a bag (usually rice and meat, possibly with the addition of dried fruit).
- Yakhni – a dish consisting of two kinds of boiled meat (beef and chicken), brought whole to the table and sliced before serving with a little broth and a garnish of boiled vegetables; a main course for Friday night dinner.
- Kov roghan – fried pieces of chicken with fried potatoes piled on top.
- Serkaniz (sirkoniz) – garlic rice dish; another variation of palov.
- Oshi piyozi – stuffed onion.
- Shulah – a Bukharian-style risotto.
- Boyjon – eggplant puree mixed only with salt and garlic, the traditional starter for the Friday-night meal in Bukharan Jewish homes.
- Slotah Bukhori – a salad made with tomato, cucumber, green onion, cilantro, salt, pepper, and lemon juice. Some also put in lettuce and chili pepper.
- Noni toki – a crispy flat bread that is baked on the back of a wok. This method creates a bowl-shaped bread.
- Fried fish with garlic sauce (for Friday night dinner): "Every Bukharian Sabbath ... is greeted with a dish of fried fish covered with a pounded sauce of garlic and cilantro". In the Bukharan dialect, the dish is called mai birion or in full mai birion ovi sir, where mai birion is fried fish and ovi sir is garlic sauce (literally "garlic water"). Bread is sometimes fried and then dipped in the remaining garlic water and is called noni-sir.

== Beverages ==
Beverages in Uzbek cuisine reflect the nation's Central Asian nomadic roots and its historical role along the Silk Road, offering a diverse array of traditional drinks. Tea holds a central place, with kok choy (green tea) being the most popular, typically served unsweetened in small ceramic piyola bowls to pair with dishes such as plov or shashlik. Black tea, or qora choy, is also widely consumed, sometimes enhanced with herbs like mint or thyme. Dairy-based options include ayran, a cold, salted yogurt drink that complements the cuisine's rich, spiced flavors, and common fermented drinks like qatiq and kumis (fermented mare’s milk), tied to pastoral traditions. Sharbat, a sweet, non-alcoholic fruit drink made by boiling dried fruits such as apricots, raisins, or apples, highlights Uzbekistan’s abundant fruit harvests. Another distinctive offering is chalop, a chilled mixture of yogurt, dill, cilantro, and vegetables, functioning as both a beverage and a light dish. For festive occasions, shirchoy, a salty milk tea prepared with butter, underscores the region’s steppe heritage.

== Gallery ==
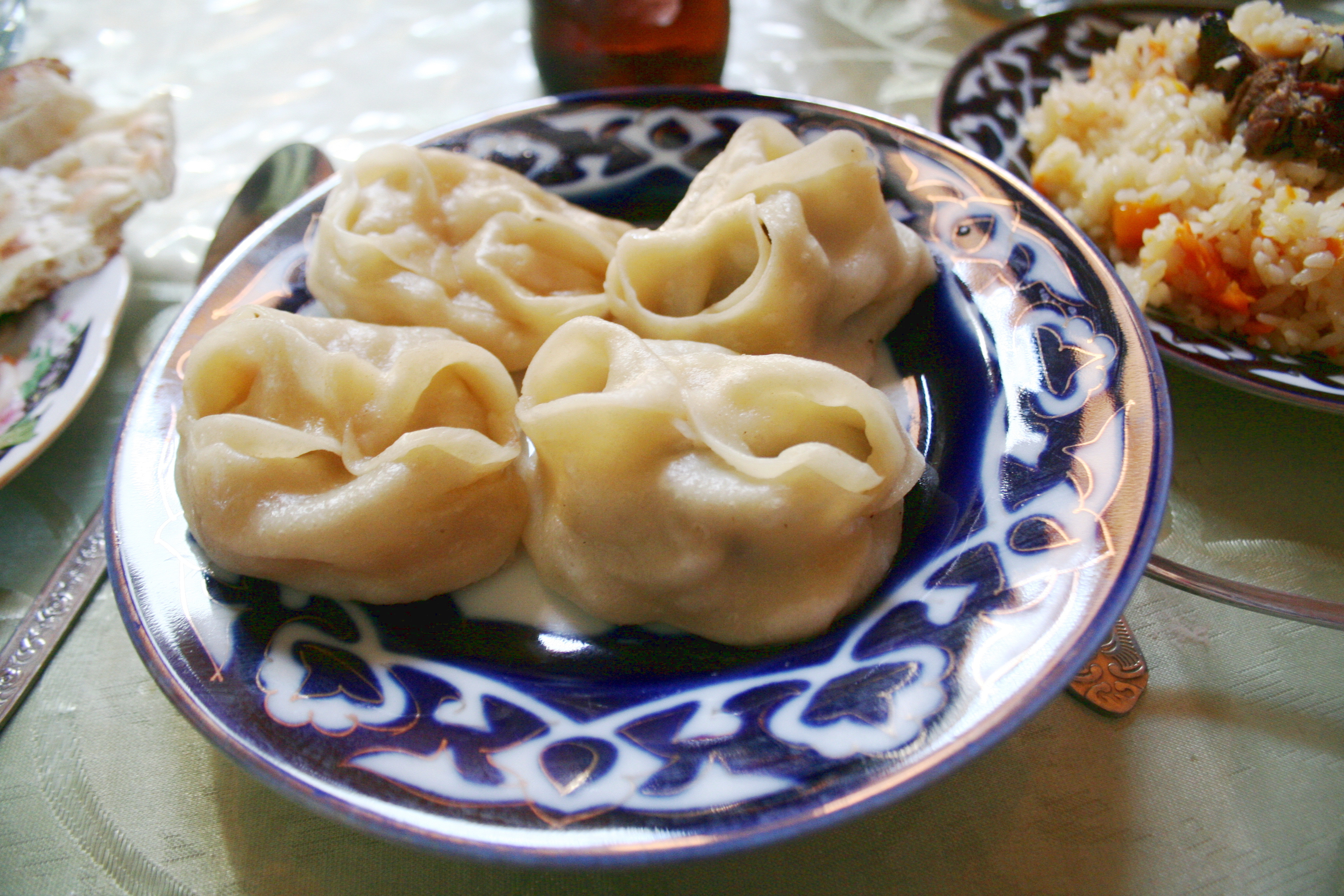
Manti – steamed dough filled with meat or vegetables

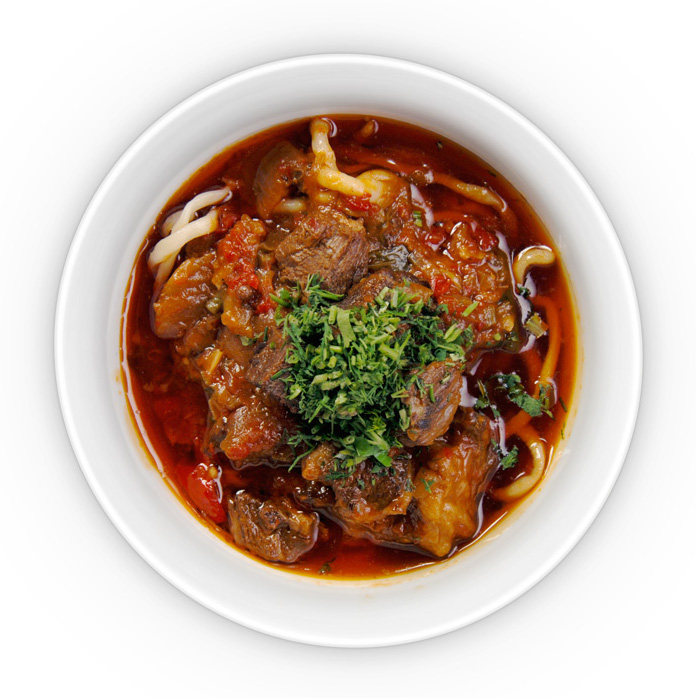
Lag'mon noodle

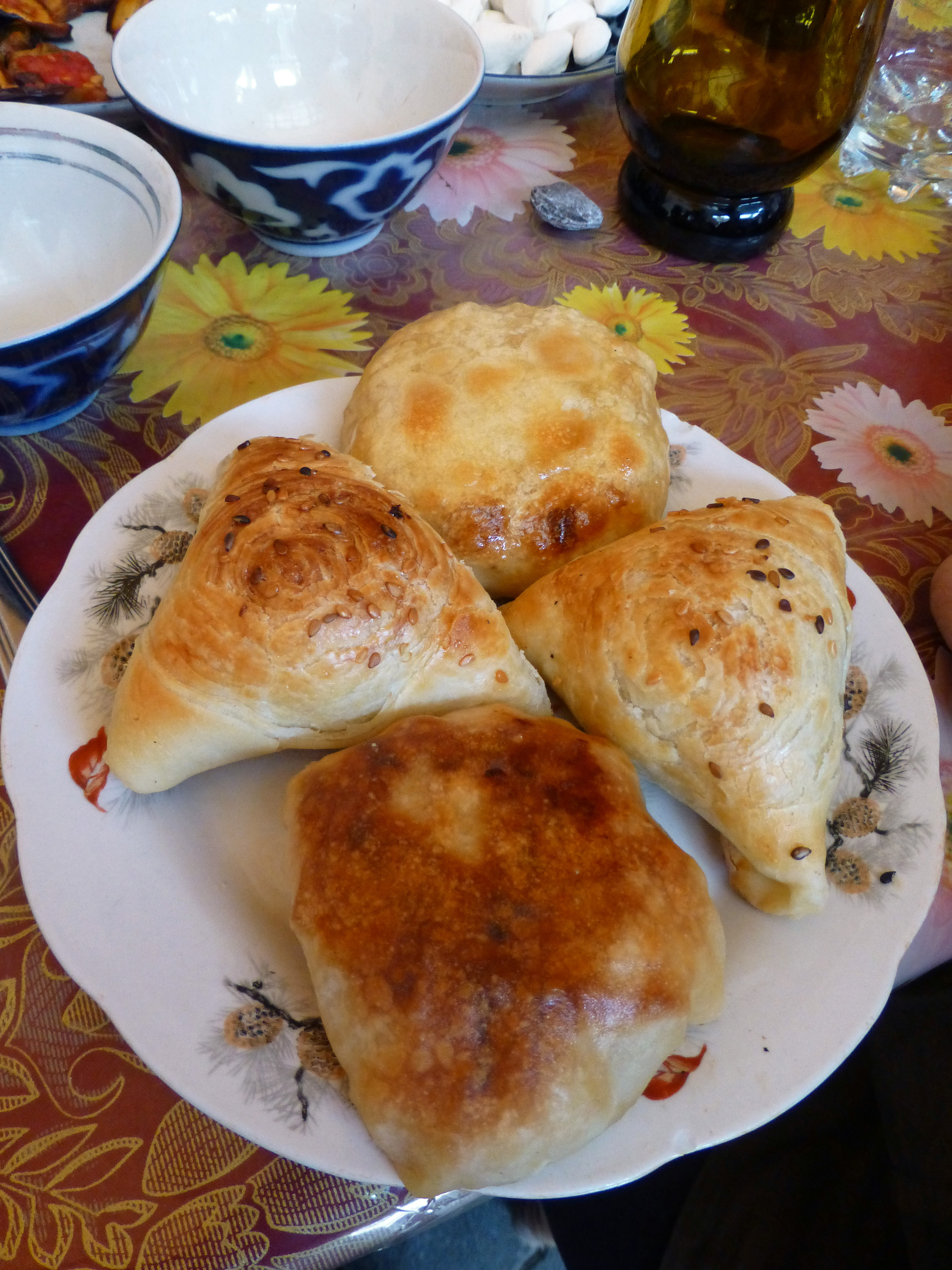
Uzbek somsa – baked pastry stuffed with meat and/or vegetables

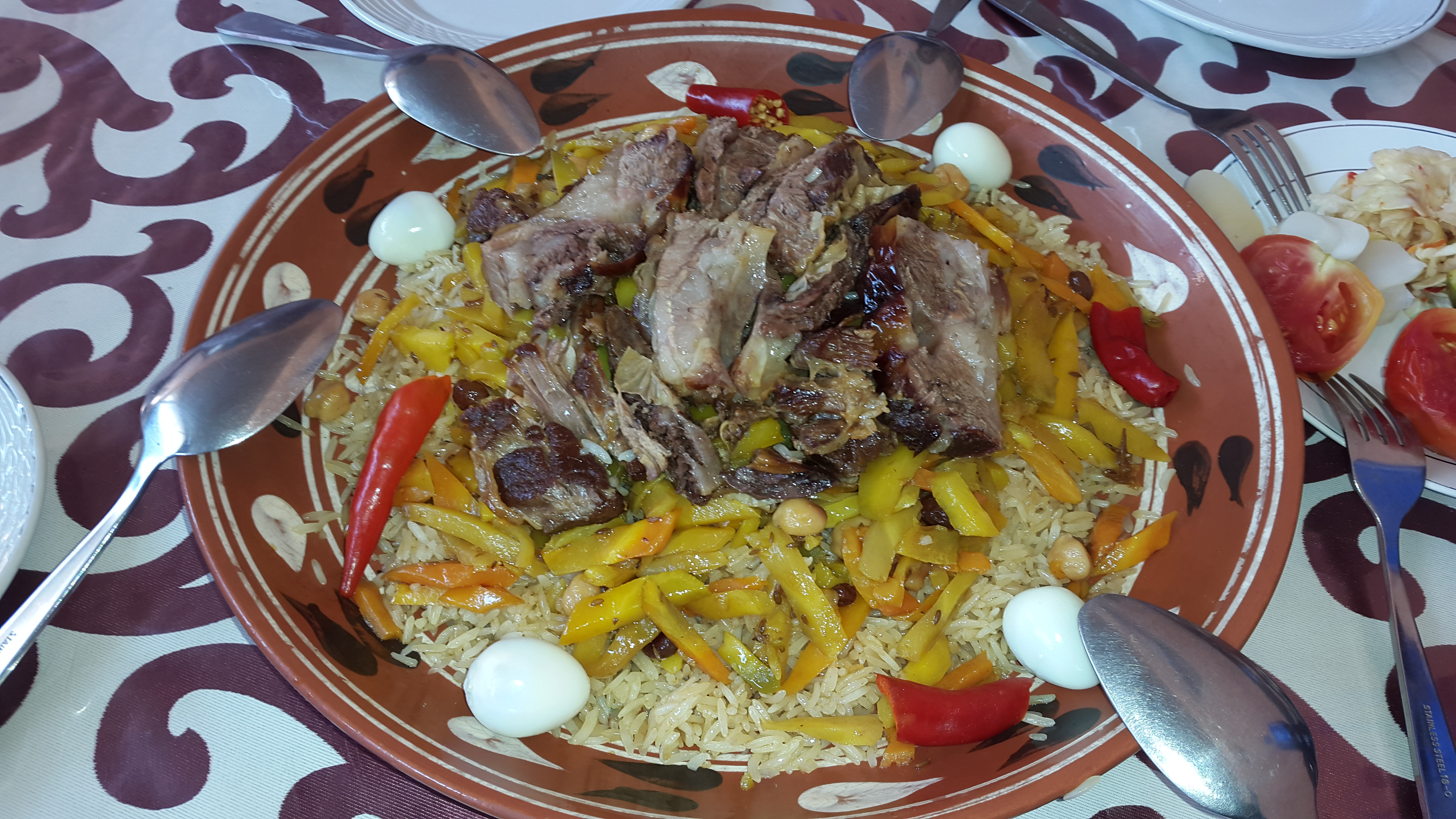
Plov (also pilaf, palov, osh) – a symbol of Uzbek cuisine, made with onion, carrot and rice; it can also include meat, boiled eggs, and qazi (sausage made of horse meat)

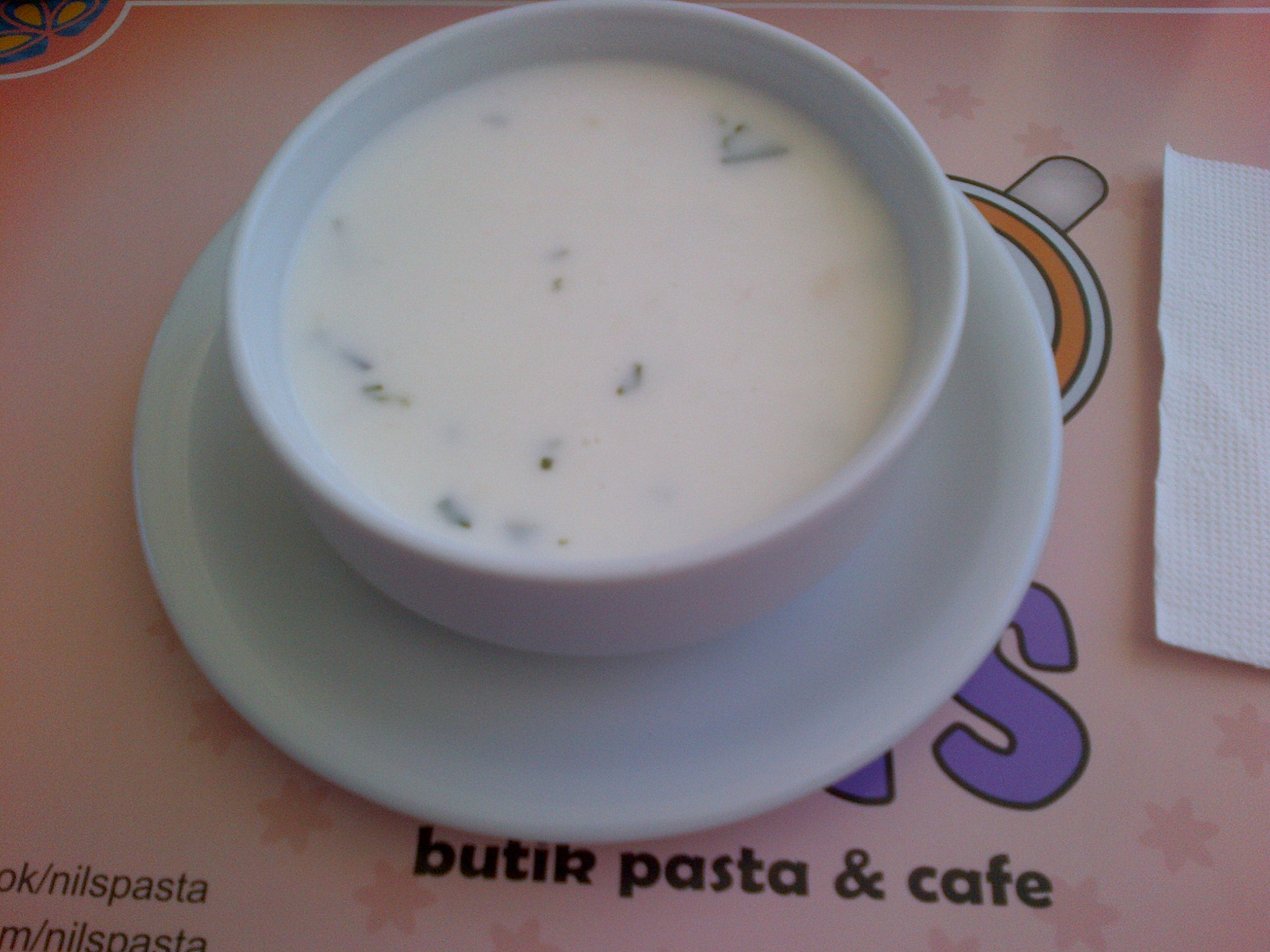
Ayran (also ayron, chalop) – beverage

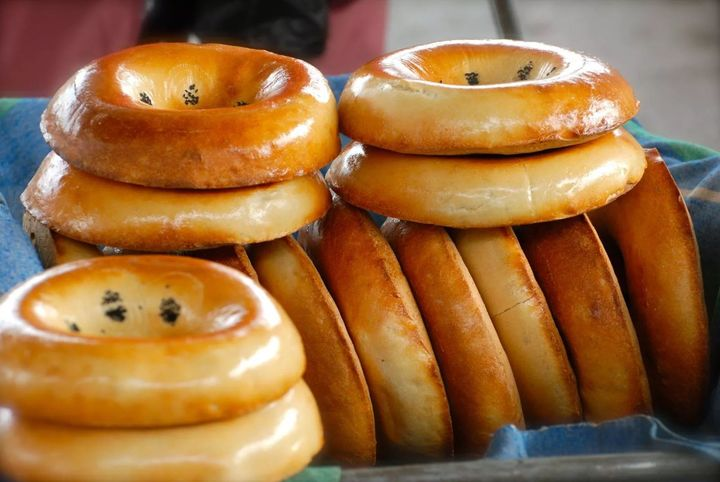
Non (bread) is an important part of Uzbek cuisine

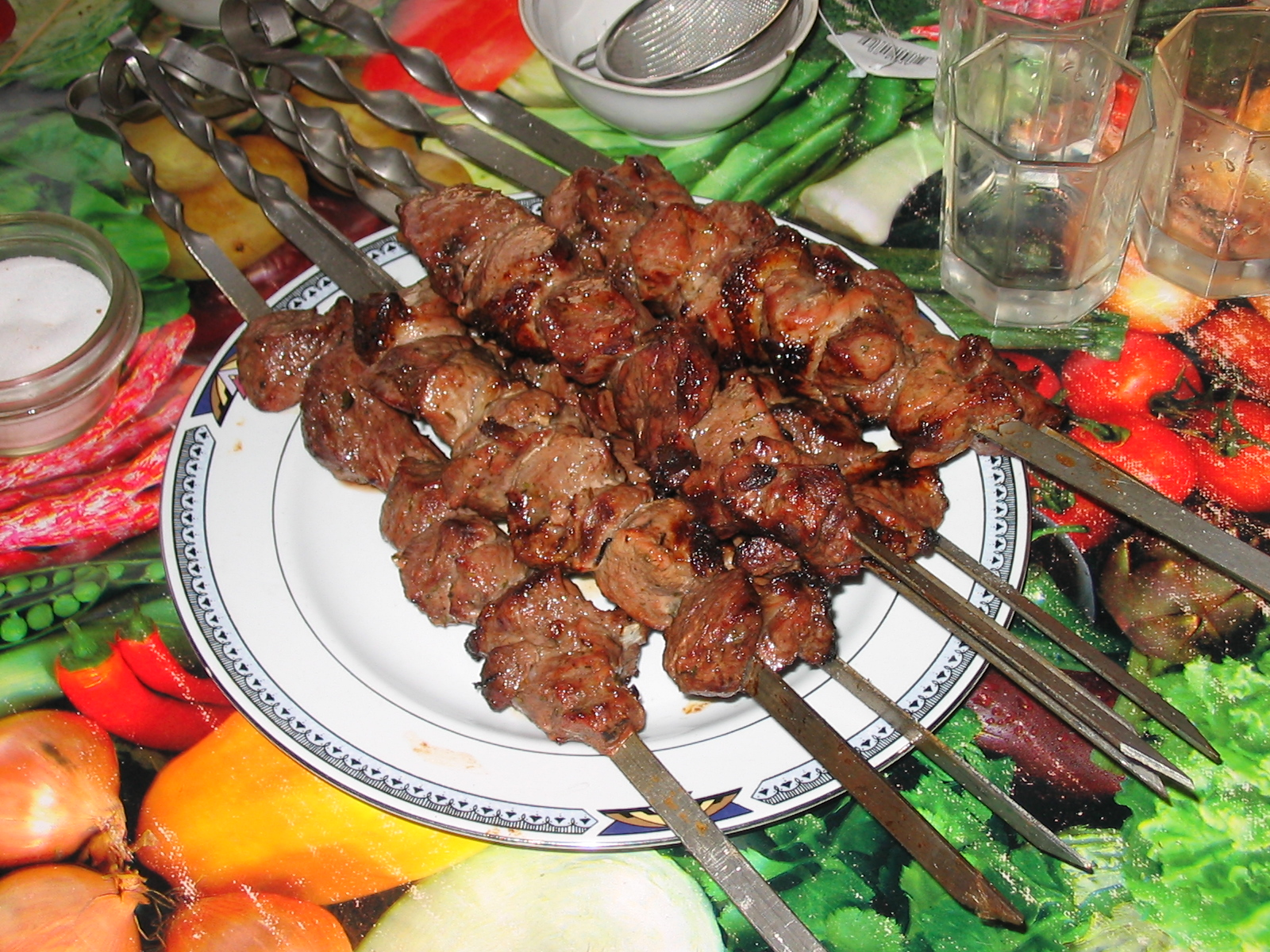
Kabob (also shashlik, kebab, kebap) – grilled meat, usually lamb, beef or chicken

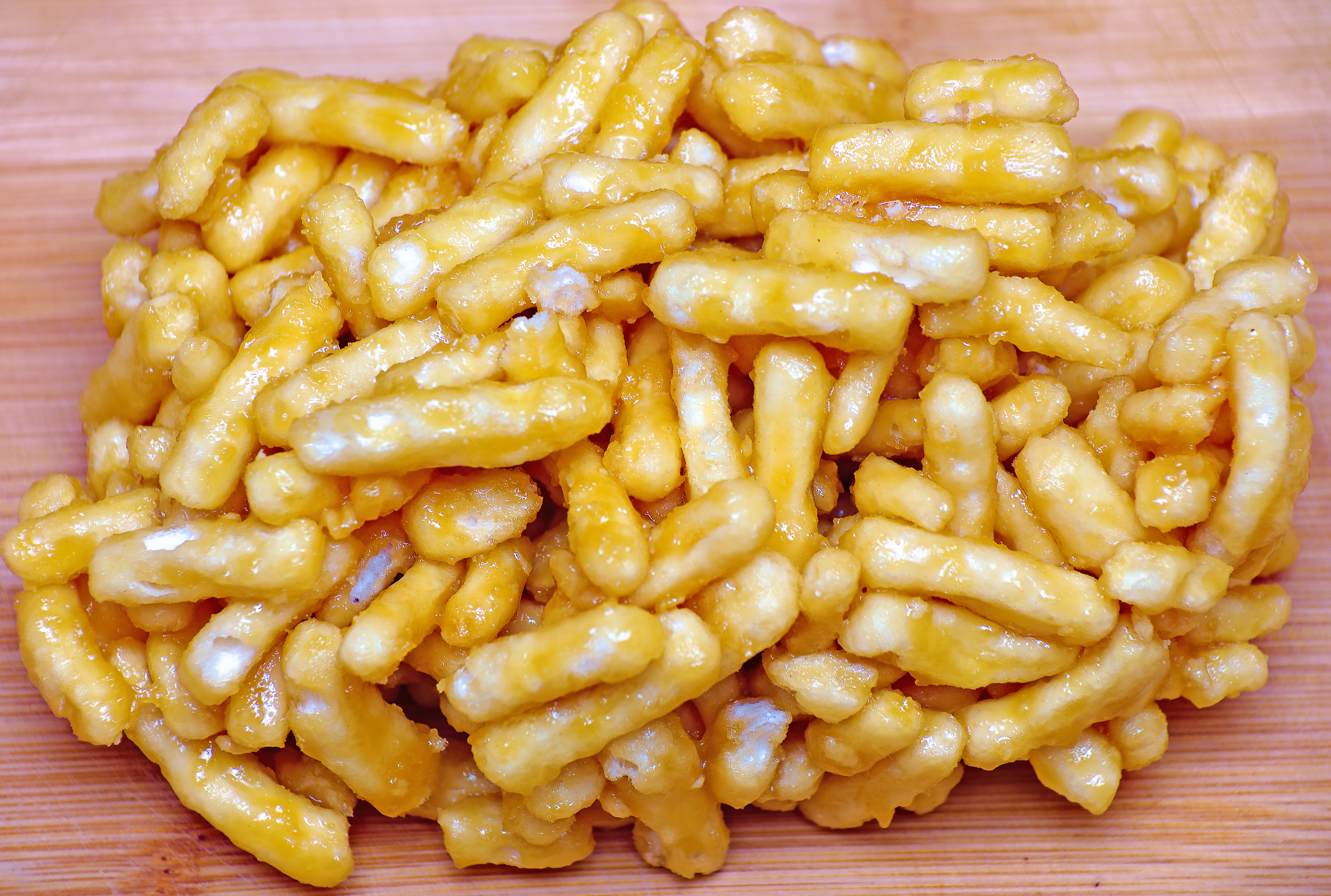
Chakchak (also chak chak, chak-chak) – fried dough usually mixed with honey or syrup, or sometimes with condensed milk

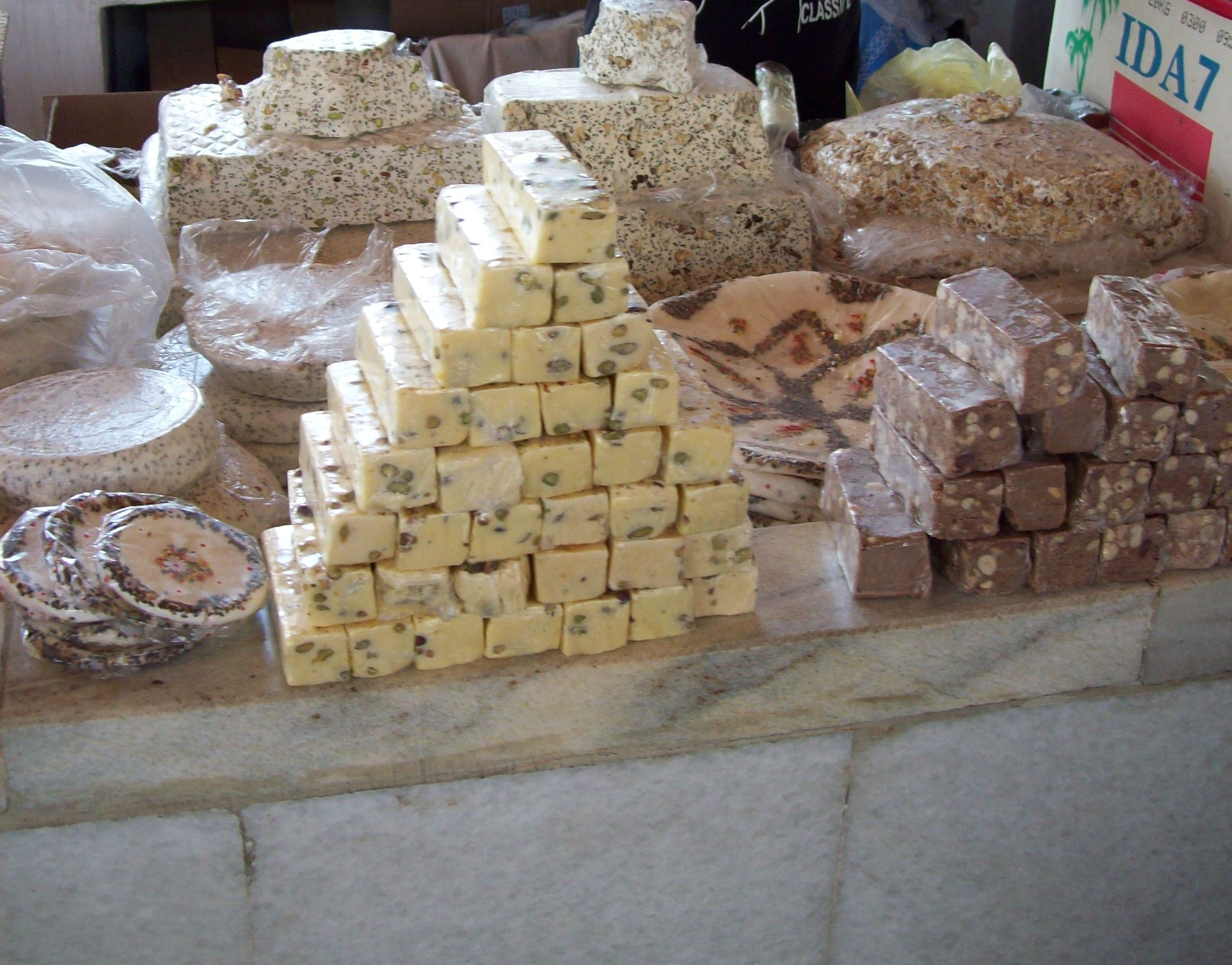
Holva (also halva, halvo) – national dessert

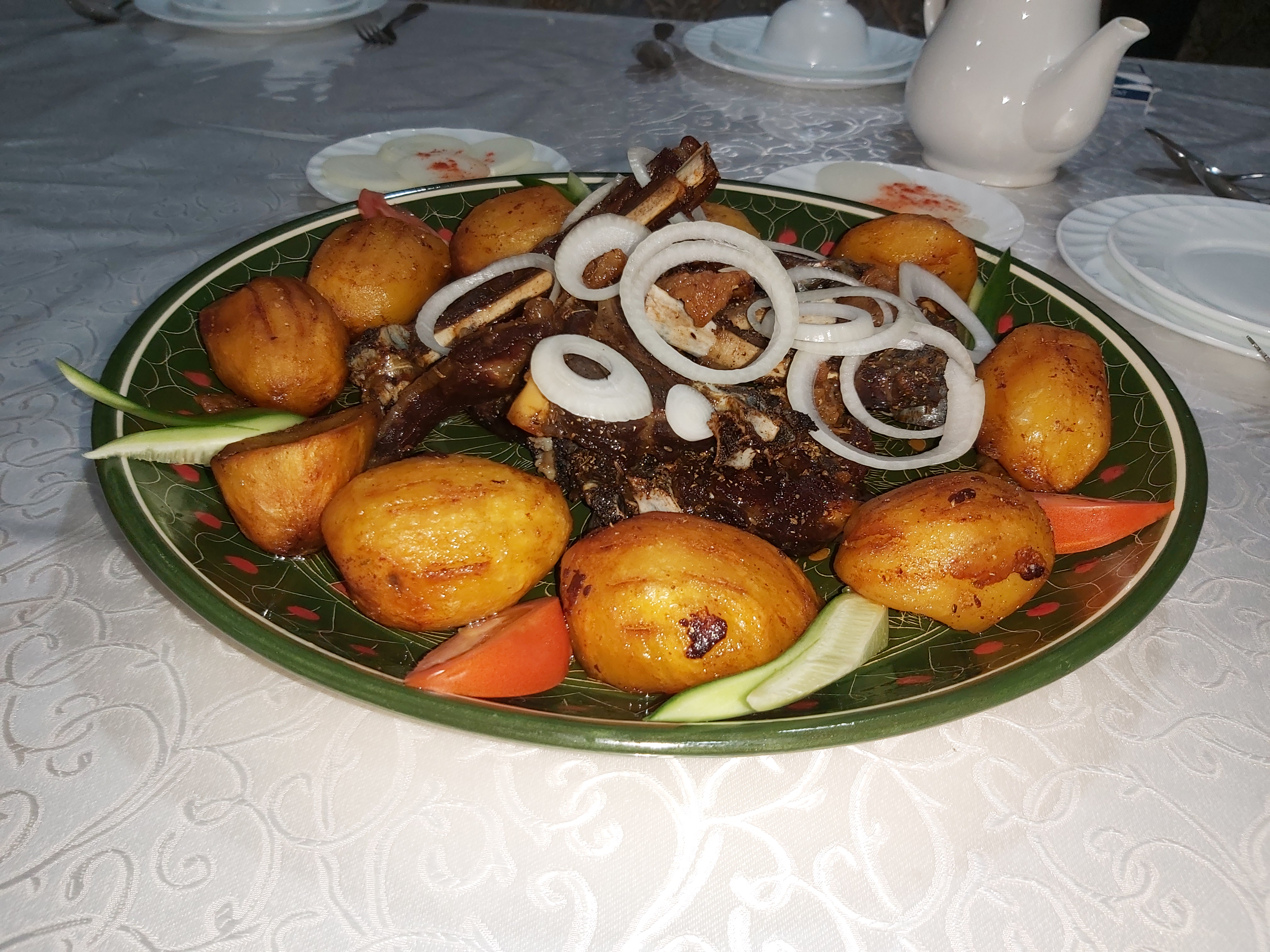
Qozon kabob – steamed potatoes in qozon (type of wok) usually with beef or lamb, sometimes with chicken

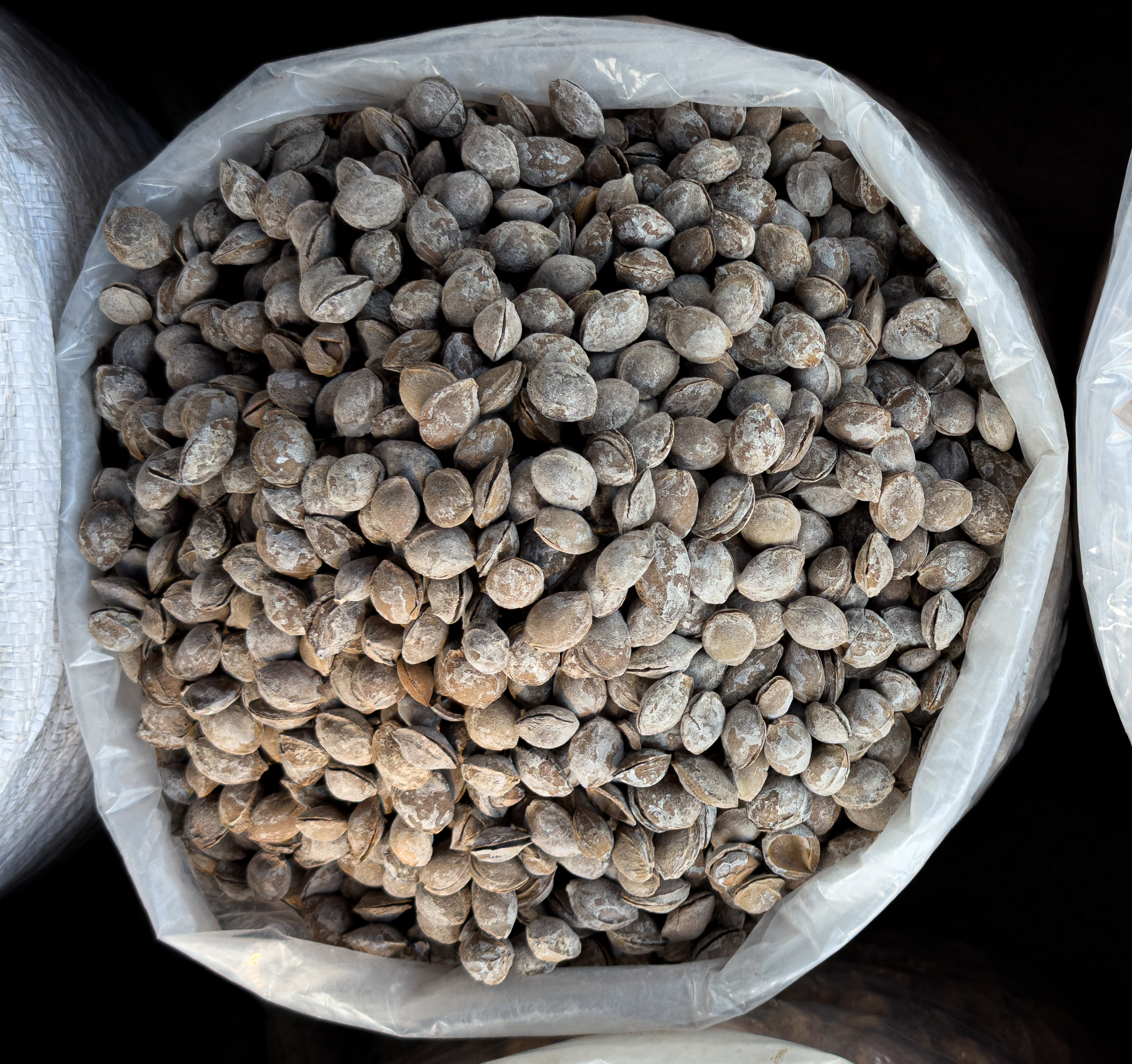
Sho'rdanak – a type of snack

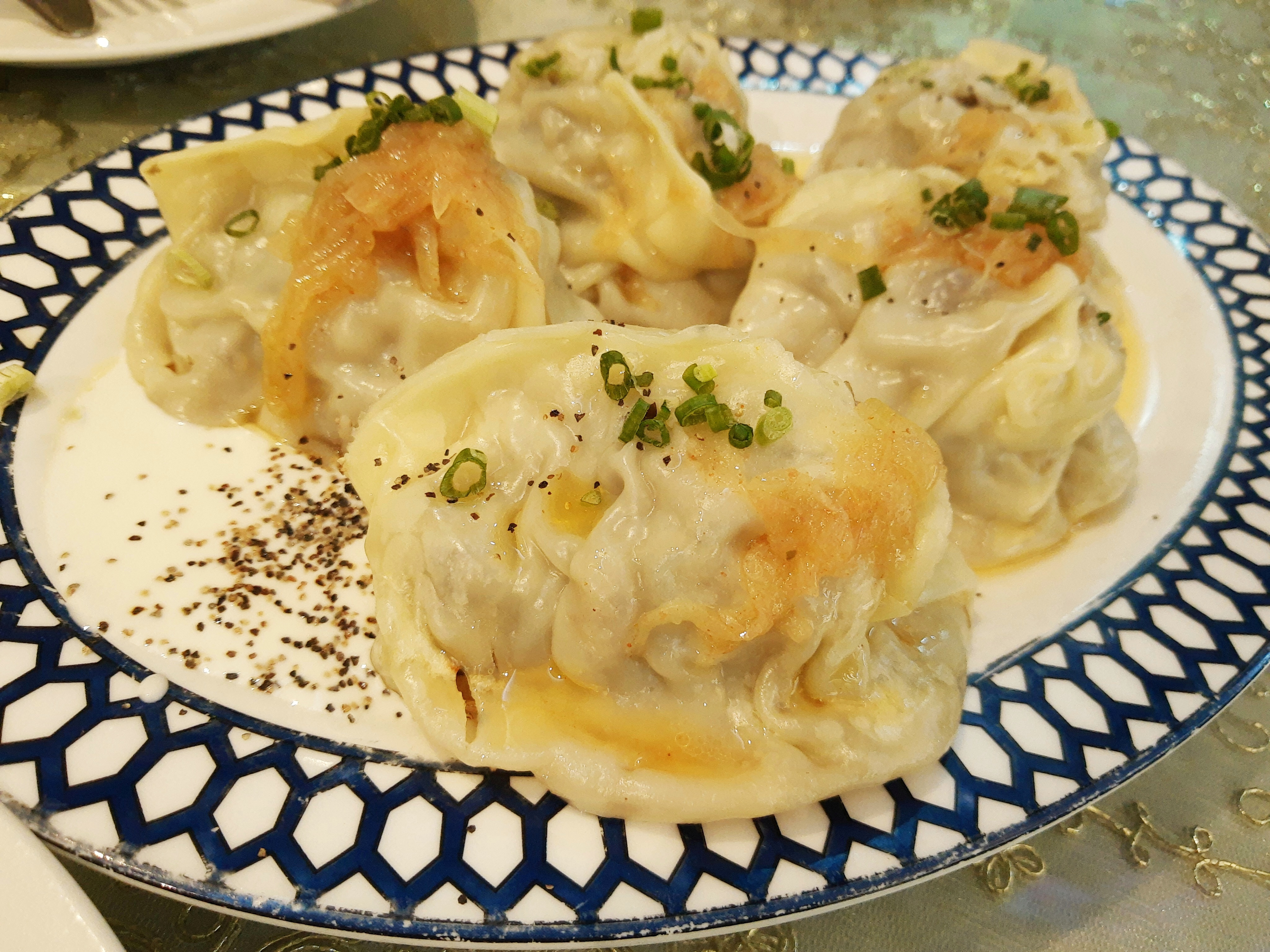
Manti

== See also ==
- List of Uzbek dishes
- Soviet cuisine
