= Nisholda =

Sweet food native to Central Asia

- Alternative names: Nishallo, nishaldo, nisholda
- Type: Dessert
- Place of origin: Central Asia
- Associated cuisine: Afghan, Iranian, Tajik, Uzbek, Bukharan Jewish
- Serving temperature: Cold
- Main ingredients: Egg whites, sugar, soap root or licorice syrup
- Ingredients generally used: Citric acid, vanilla, anise powder
- Food energy (per 100 g serving): 200 kcal (840 kJ)
Nutritional value
(per 100 g serving)
- Protein: 5 g
- Fat: 0 g
- Carbohydrate: 50 g

Nisholda, also spelled as nishallo, nishaldo, or nisholda (Persian: نشلا; Bukharian dialect: Нишалло; Tajik: Нишолло; Uzbek: Nisholda) is a sweet dish that resembles white jam, only thicker. It is popular in Afghan, Iranian, Tajik, and Uzbek cuisines. Nisholda is also a traditional dish among the Bukharan (Central Asian, Samarkand) Jews.

The people who make nisholda in Iran, Afghanistan, Tajikistan, and Uzbekistan are called nishallopaz.

Nisholda is traditionally prepared during the month of Ramadan (Ramazan) and consumed by those who fast during iftar, along with breads, and washed down with hot tea (usually green).

== Preparation ==
Raw egg whites from four eggs are whipped until they increase in volume several times, to the state where thick foam stays on the spoon. After that, the soap root is peeled, cut into pieces and boiled in water for 25 minutes. Some people replace the soap root with licorice syrup. The ready-made broth is cooled and added to the whipped egg whites and whipped again.

Meanwhile, a syrup is boiled from sugar, citric acid and water. After that, this cooled syrup is added to the whipped egg white foam and continuously stirred until the whole mass becomes homogeneous, similar to thick sour cream.

Nisholda is stirred with a special wooden spoon. The ready-made nisholda is served in a bowl or a large plate. Traditionally, a pinch of anise powder is sprinkled over the nisholda, some people add vanilla.

In Tashkent, and in the other regions of the Republic of Uzbekistan, the delicacy is sold at bazaars right in huge pots, cauldrons. Since the eggs are not heat-treated during the preparation, it is best to use pasteurized whites or well-washed fresh eggs from a trusted manufacturer.

The syrup should not separate from the foam and settle to the bottom of well-whipped nisholda. For flavor, citric acid and vanilla are added to the nisholda when whipping. Served in bowls, cups, or vases with tea, at festive receptions.

== Bibliography ==
- O'zbekiston Milliy Ensiklopediyasi . N harfi (PDF). Tashkent: «Ўзбекистон миллий энциклопедияси» Давлат илмий нашриёти. 2000.
- Кулинарный словарь. p. 257.
