= Samarkand non =

Uzbek bread originating from Samarkand

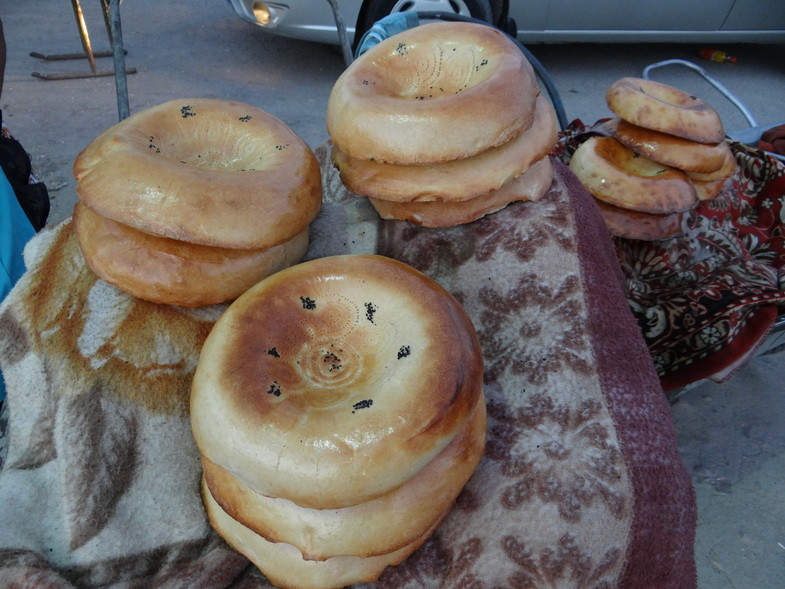
Non in Samarkand

Samarkand non or "Samarkand bread" is a traditional bread from Uzbekistan. It is a very popular bread that accompanies the numerous dishes of the traditional Uzbek cuisine.

It originates from the region of Samarkand. Shaped like a cake, it is thinner in the center, and has a rather soft crust. It is baked in a tandir, a traditional well-shaped oven.

In 2022, around 15,000 Samarkand breads were baked every day in Uzbekistan.

== Legend ==
A legend tells that one day, the Khan from Bukhara, having tasted the "non" of Samarkand, asked that the best baker of the city be taken with him to make bread in Bukhara. The baker, once in Bukhara, made the bread, but the taste was not the same. The emir was furious and asked his baker for an explanation. The baker told him that it might be because of the flour, which was not the same as the one from Samarkand. The emir sent for flour from Samarkand for his baker, but the bread still didn't taste the same. Perhaps the water, then? The emir brought water from Samarkand, but nothing helped, the bread still didn't have the same taste as what he had tasted before. The baker finally explained to him that what was missing in the bread was the air of Samarkand. The emir, not being able to bring air, let the baker come back to Samarkand, so that he could send him bread made in Samarkand.

== See also ==
- Uzbek cuisine
- Tandyr nan
- Central Asian cuisine
