= Mastava =

Traditional Uzbek, Tajik dish

Māstāba
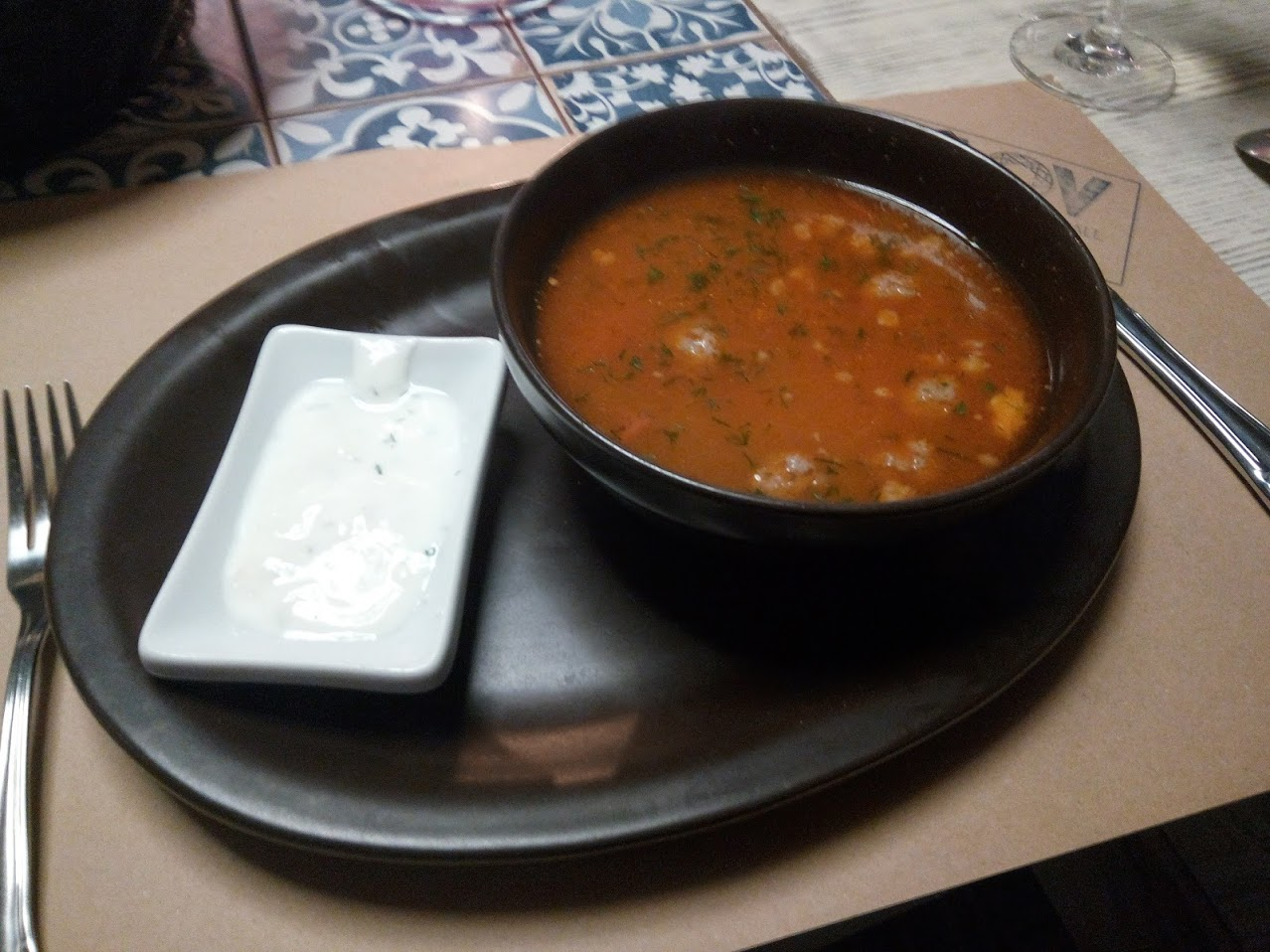
- Mastava
- Alternative names: "Liquid pilaf"
- Type: Soup
- Course: Main course
- Place of origin: Uzbekistan, Tajikistan
- Region or state: Central Asia
- Associated cuisine: Uzbek cuisine, Tajik cuisine
- Serving temperature: Hot
- Main ingredients: Meat (usually lamb), rice, vegetables
- Ingredients generally used: Spices, herbs, katyk
- Similar dishes: Shurpa

Māstāba, or mastava (Cyrillic: Мастава, Tajik: Мастоба), is a traditional Uzbek and Tajik soup. Sometimes it is called "liquid pilaf".

The soup is always prepared using the frying method typical of Central Asian cuisine, similar to some types of shurpa, and fundamentally differs from the latter in the use of rice. Mastava can be prepared only from rice and vegetables, but it is customary to cook the soup in meat broth.

The preparation follows the principle of Central Asian pilaf. Meat, usually lamb ribs, is seared in a qozon, a traditional cast-metal cauldron with a semicircular bottom for cooking. Carrots and onions are then added, and sometimes root vegetables such as beets. Tomatoes or tomato paste are often added to the zirvak. As soon as the zirvak is ready, water, washed rice, and usually potatoes are added.

Various spices are used, such as cumin, tarragon, red pepper, black pepper, basil, parsley, coriander, and barberry berries. Before serving, the mastava can be seasoned again with spices, herbs, crushed garlic and finally a small amount of katyk (Cyrillic: Катык), a fermented milk product similar to yogurt.

== Etymology ==
The origin of the word mastava can be traced back to the Tajik word māstāba. The word is a compound of māst meaning "yogurt" and āb meaning "water" or "broth." Due to betacism, the word is pronounced as māstāva and has entered the Uzbek language as such.
