= Kazan (cookware) =

Type of large cooking pot

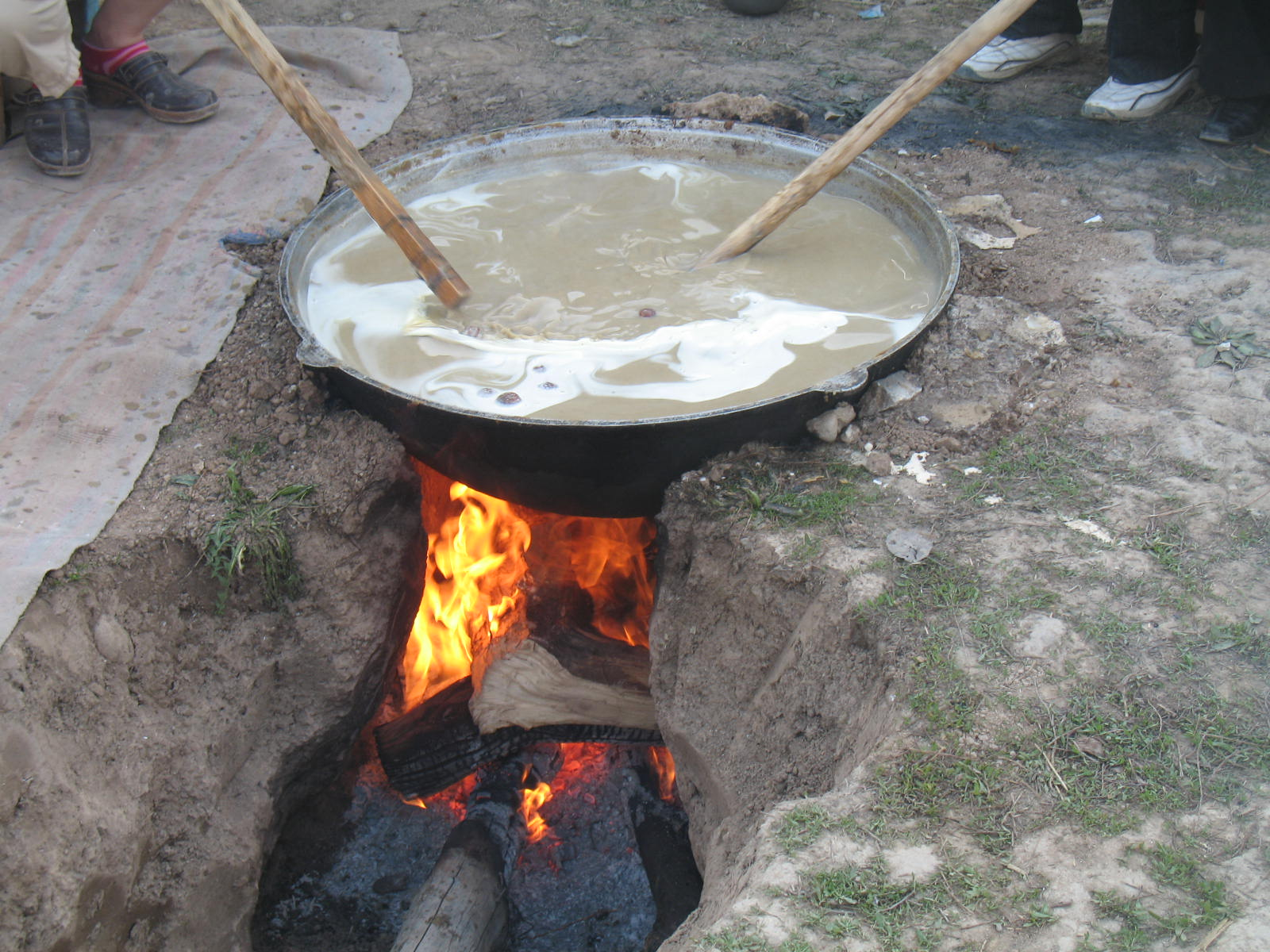
Sumalak being made in a kazan in a ground oven.

A kazan or qazan is a large cooking pot used throughout Central Asia, Kazakhstan, Afghanistan, Armenia, Azerbaijan, Turkey, and the Balkan Peninsula, roughly equivalent to a cauldron, boiler, or Dutch oven. They come in a variety of sizes (small modern cooking pots are sometimes referred to as kazans), and are often measured by their capacity, such as "a 50-litre kazan". Usually their diameter is half a meter. Kazans are made of cast iron or in modern times aluminum and are used to cook a wide variety of foods, including plov (pilaf), sumalak, shorpa, kesme, and bawyrsaq, and as such are an important element in celebrations when food must be prepared for large numbers of guests.

Kazans may be suspended over a fire in a variety of ways. Sometimes metal frames (a tripod called sajayaq) are made, or alternatively (especially for large kazan), a hole may be dug in the ground which will hold the kazan and provide enough space underneath to keep a fire under it—in this case, an access hole is built in the side to allow the fire to be tended, and to let in air. Smaller kazans may be used on [usually gas] stoves with the help of a specially designed piece of metal that lets the heat [of the flame] transfer to the kazan while at the same time holding it upright and steady.

== Etymology ==
The origin of the word kazan can be ultimately traced back to Old Turkic verb kaz-, meaning "gouge, carve, hollow out" and present participle suffix of +(g)An. The word evolved to Middle Turkic as kazğan, meaning "big copper vessel". Oldest written record of the word in any Turkic language is dated back to Mahmud al-Kashgari's 1073 work Dīwān Lughāt al-Turk. It is also mentioned in Codex Cumanicus.

== Health hazards ==
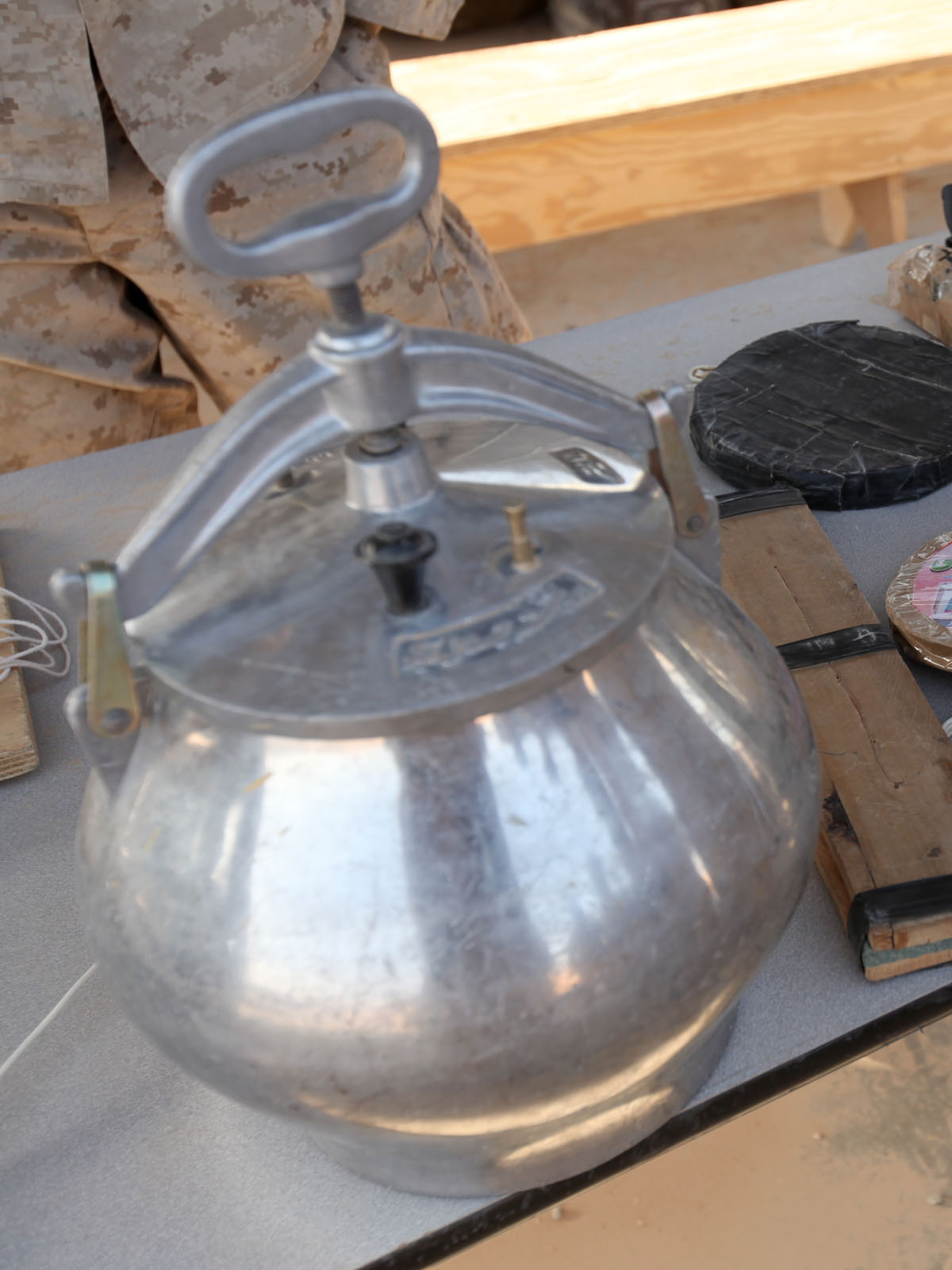
Aluminum Afghani pressure cooker kazan, similar to those found to contain high levels of lead causing lead poisoning in refugee children.

Some nominally aluminium kazans in fact may be made from a mixture of smelted metals, including lead. Such kazans represent a serious health hazard if food prepared from them is eaten, particularly for children. High levels of lead have been found in pressure cooker kazans from Afghanistan.

== History ==
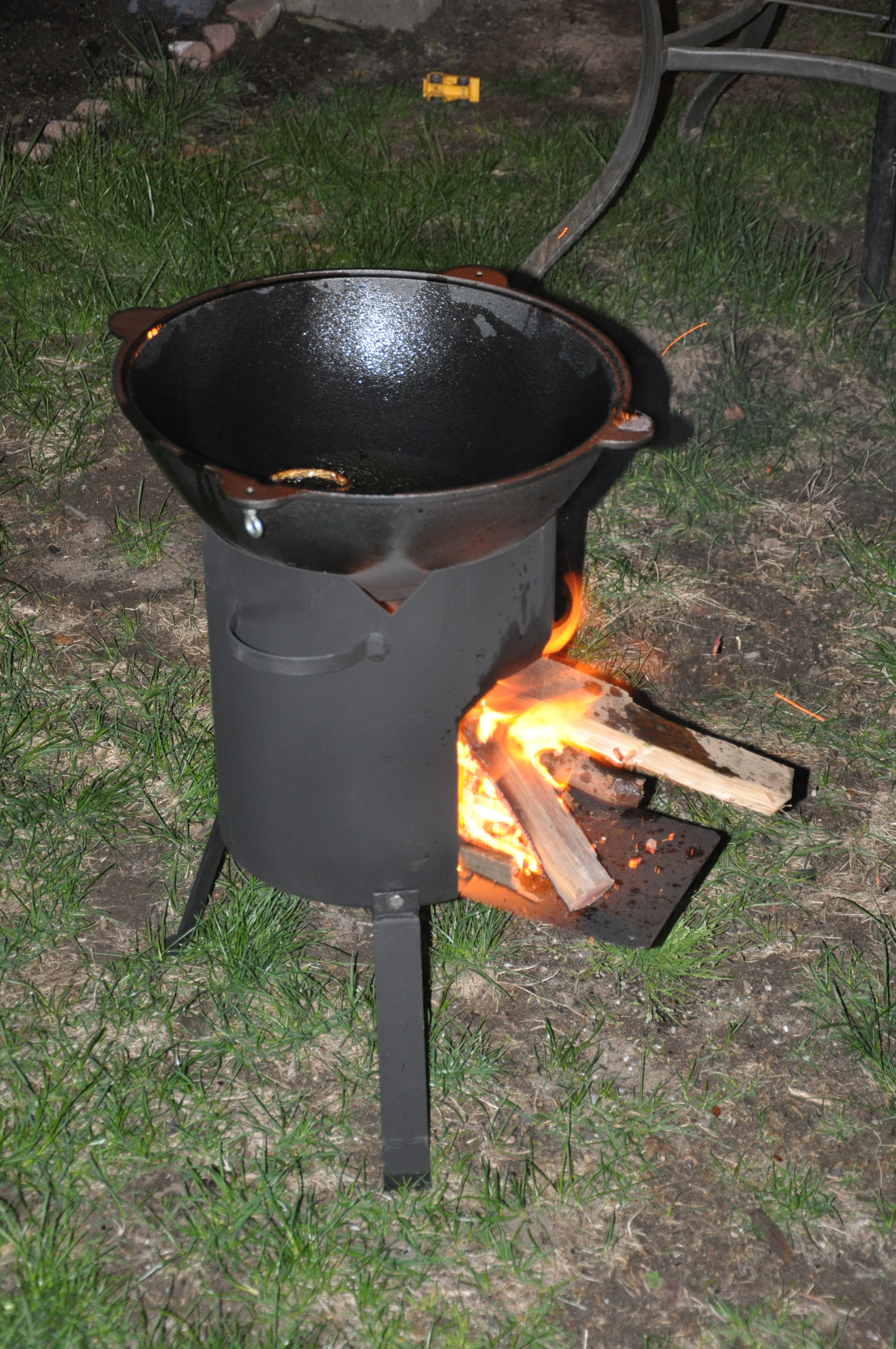

Kazans seem to have been invented by the Turkic nomads and were used as their basic cooking utensil. They resemble in shape the Chinese wok or the Indian karahi but differ from them in shape and also lack a handle. The Scythians and other Iranian peoples inhabitants of the western steppes before the Turkic migrations, used different cooking utensils. They used round bottomed clay and bronze pots having a more big-bellied shape than the hemispherical profile of the kazan. Some peoples neighboring the Turkic peoples adopted the kazan for its usefulness. Especially in making pilaf (rice) for occasions like weddings.

In the Ottoman Empire, the kazan was the common symbol of the janissary regiments and they would overturn it to indicate a quarrel with their superiors. This has led to the Turkish expression of "Kazan devirmek" "to overturn the kazan" as a synonym for mutiny. The kazans of Turkey have adopted the typical flat-bottomed shape of the middle east.

== Gallery ==
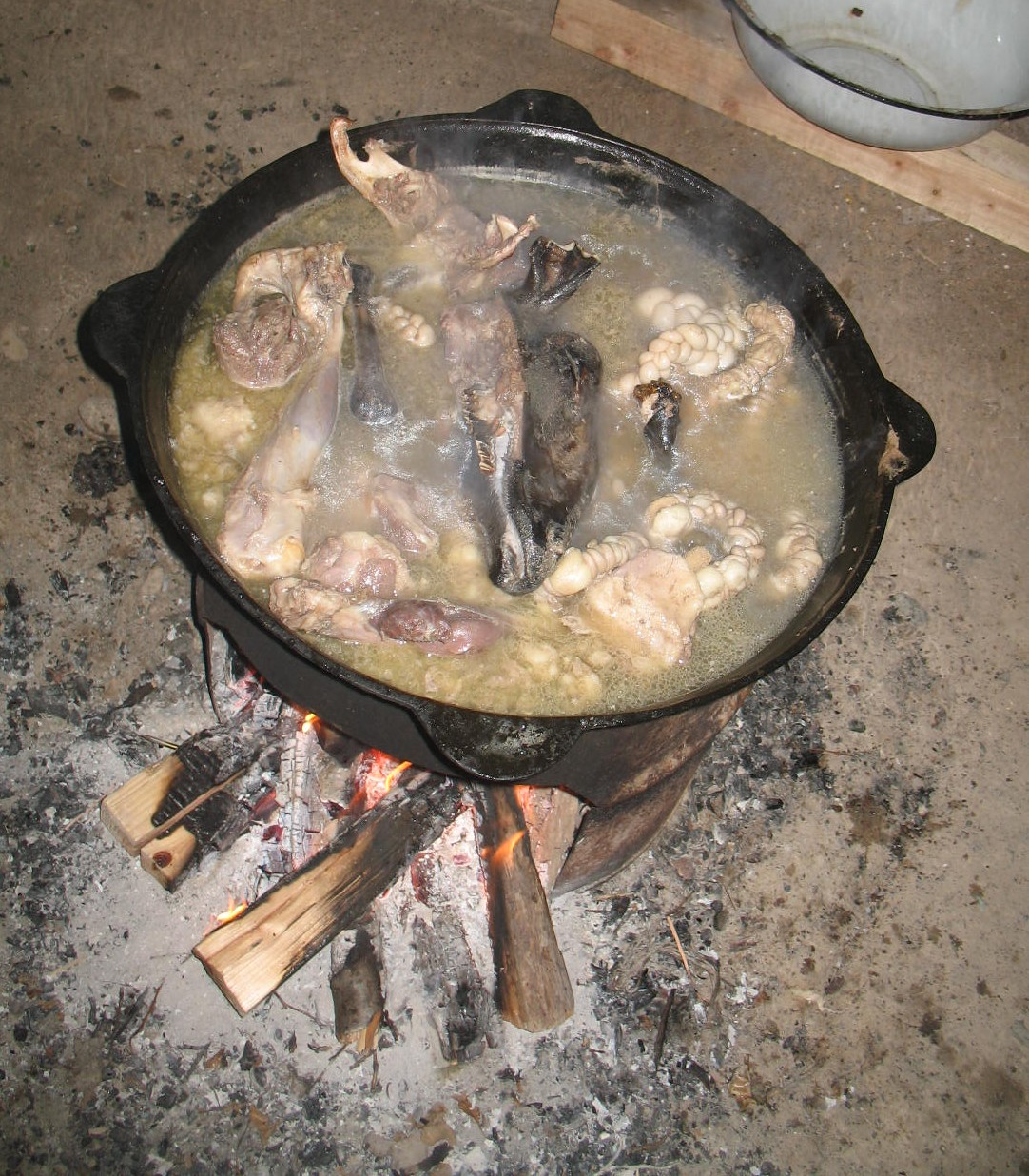
Shorpo being made in a kazan in Kyrgyzstan.

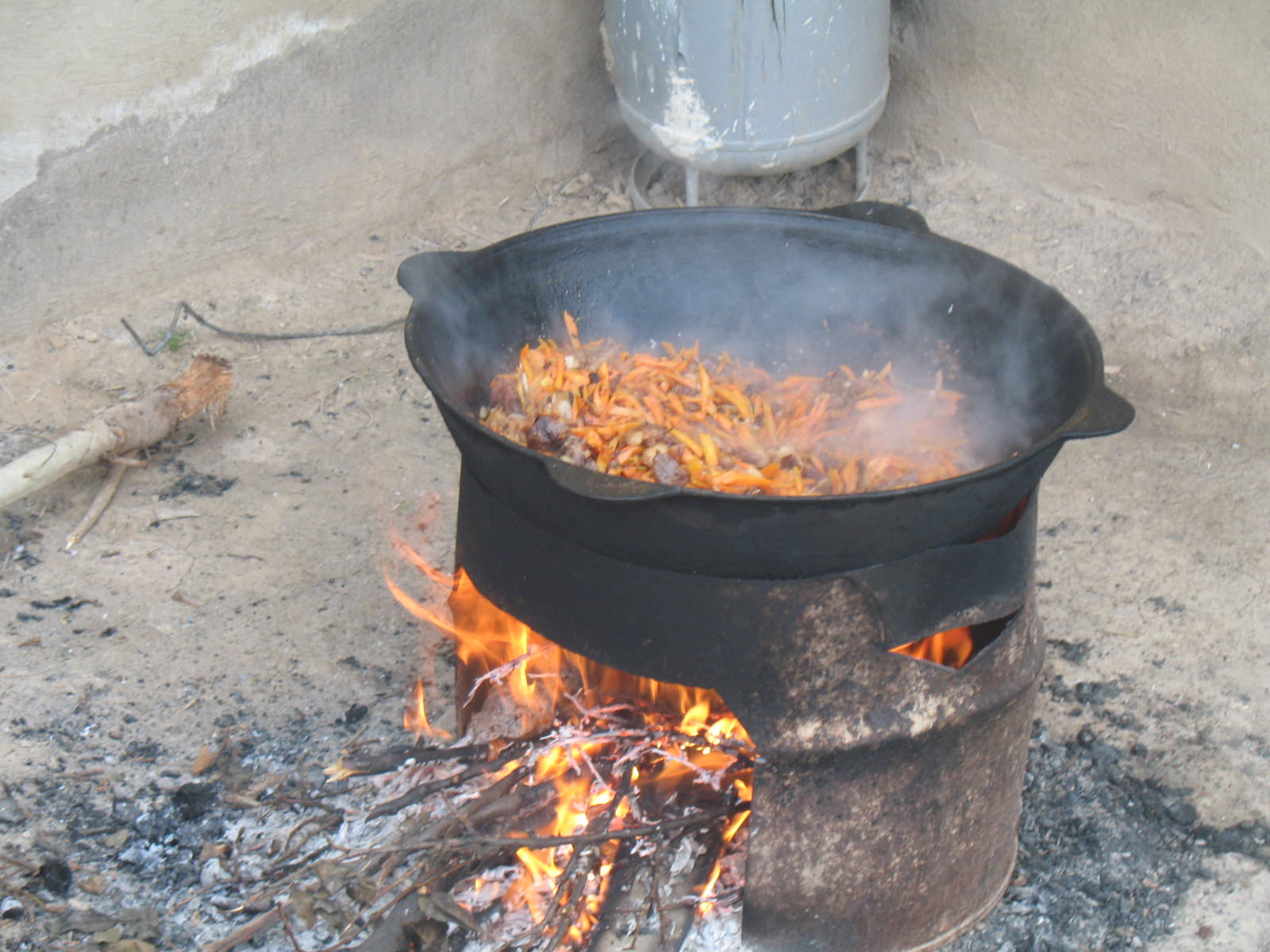
Plov (pilaf) being made in a kazan suspended above a fire using a metal frame.

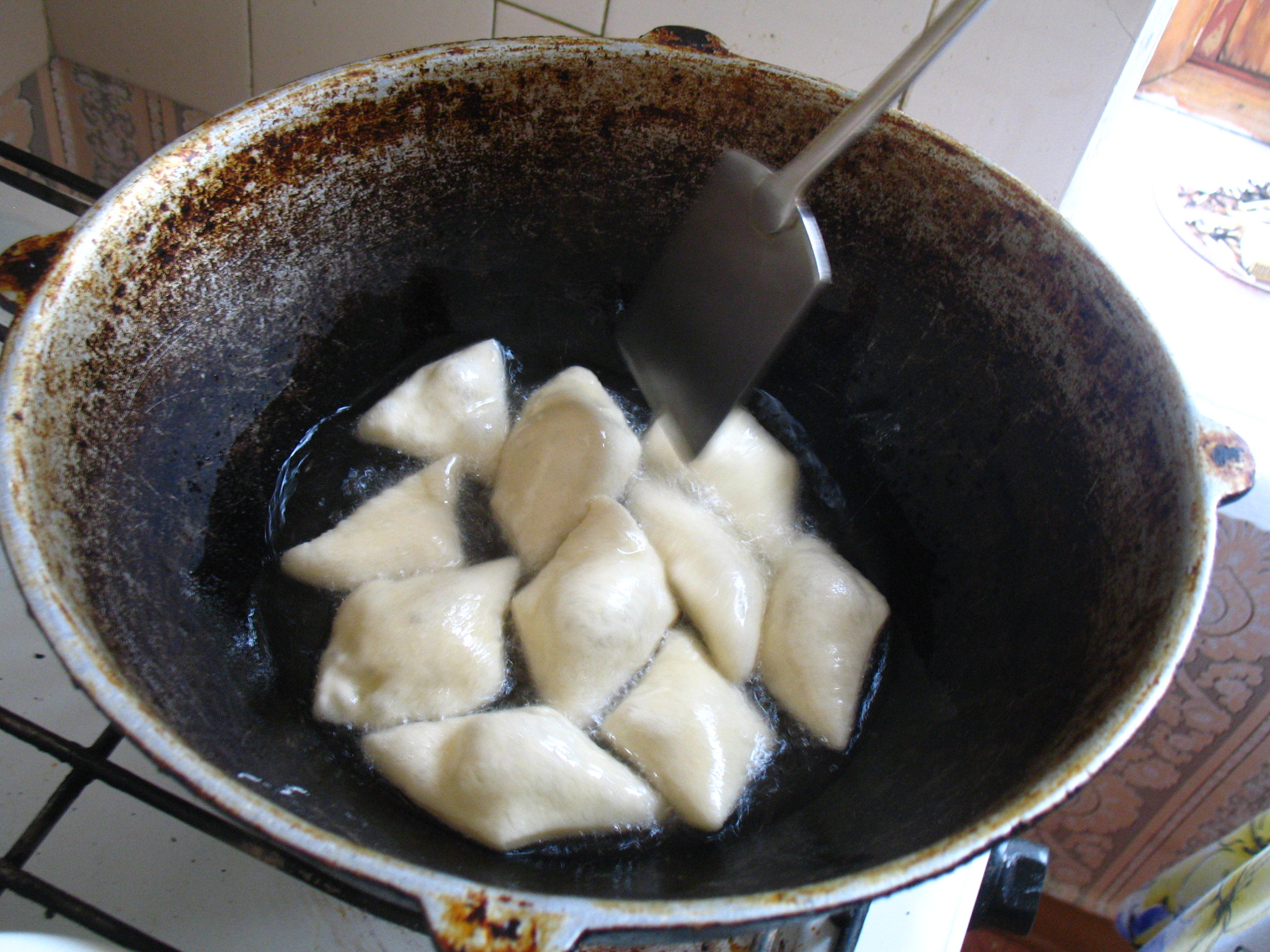
Kazakh boorsoq being fried in a stove-top kazan.

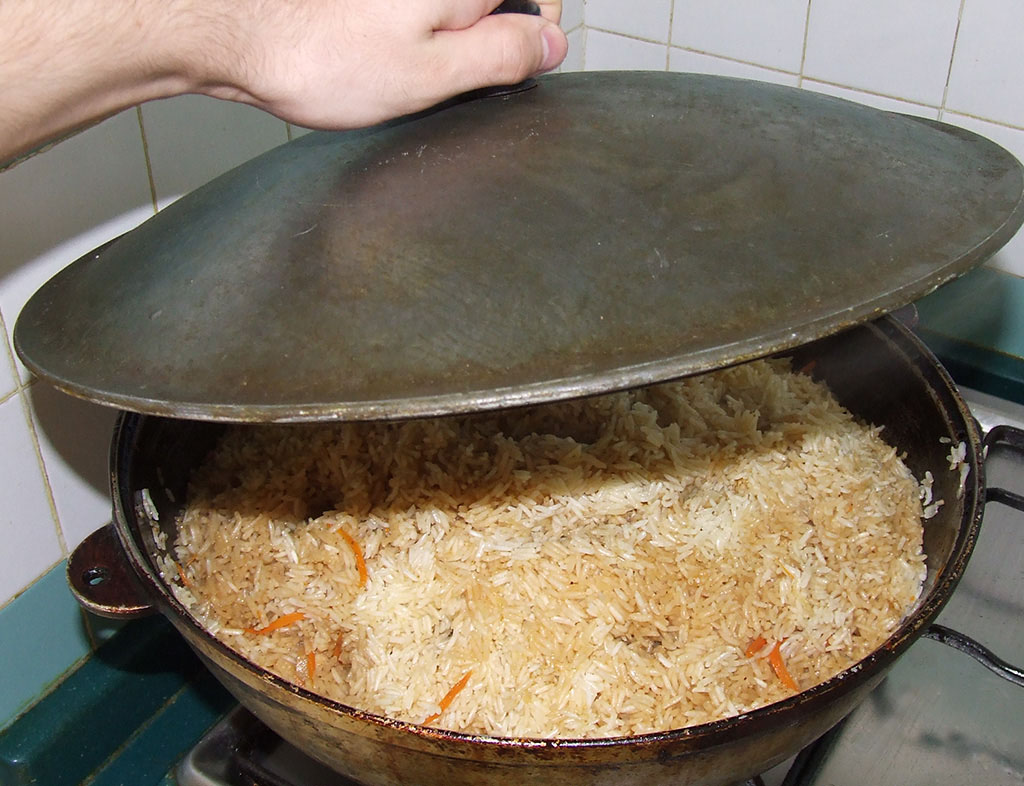
Plov cooking in a kazan.

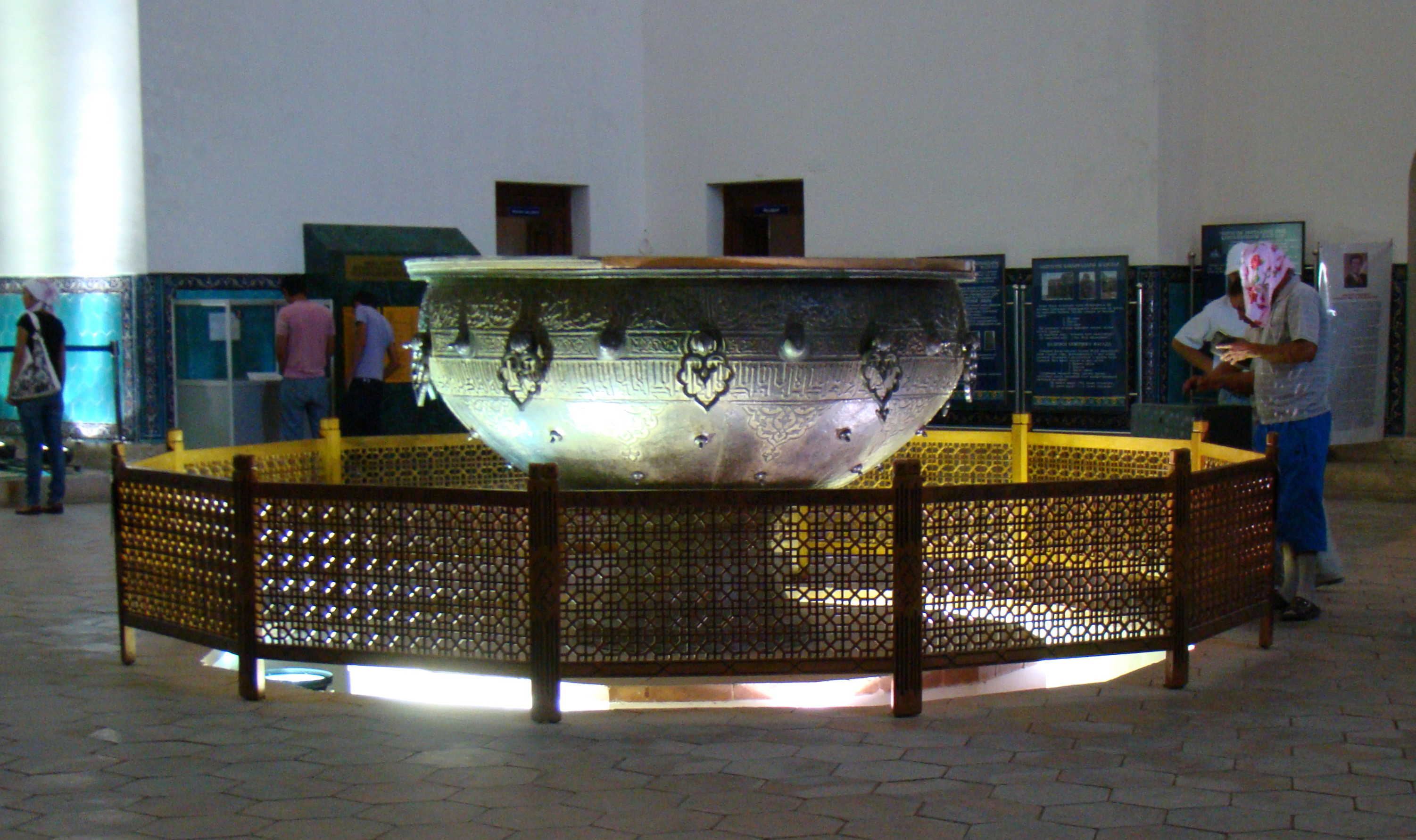
Tay-kazan - ritual kazan; the name translates as "kazan for a stallion"

== Name of the cities ==
Gazandjyk or Kazandzhik currently Bereket - is a city in Balkan Province in western Turkmenistan. The name is composed of Kazan and -jyk, a diminutive suffix (denoting small in size), so the name can be translated into English as cauldron-ette or pot-kin. Kazan is the capital and largest city of the Republic of Tatarstan in Russia.

== See also ==
- List of cooking vessels
- List of Uzbek dishes
- Wok
