= Nadir Devanbegi Madrasah (Bukhara) =

Madrasa in Bukhara, Uzbekistan

- Nodir Devonbegi Madrasasi
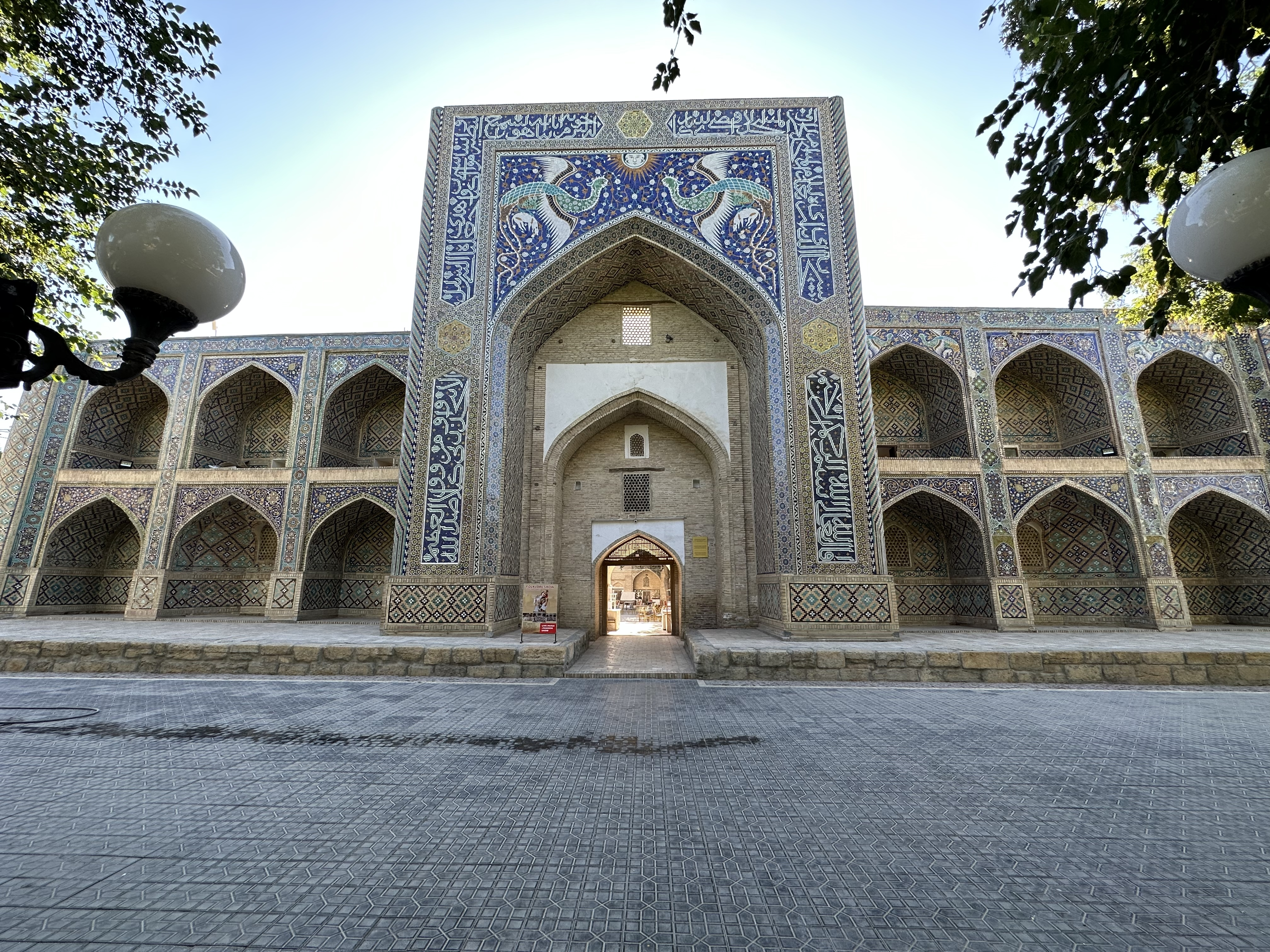
- The main facade of Nadir Devan Begi madrasa
- Interactive map of the Nadir Devanbegi Madrasah area

General information
- Status: under the protection of the state
- Type: Madrasah
- Architectural style: Central Asian architecture
- Location: J. Ikromiy MFY; Mehtar anbar Street, Bukhara Region, Uzbekistan
- Coordinates: 39.7732°N 64.4216°E
- Construction started: 1619
- Construction stopped: 1620
- Owner: State property. Bukhara Region Cultural Heritage Department on the basis of operational management rights

Technical details
- Material: baked bricks
- Floor count: two-storey

Nadir Devanbegi Madrasah is an architectural monument in Bukhara, Uzbekistan. It was built between 1622 and 1623 by Nadir Devanbegi (Nadir Mirza Togay ibn Sultan), the minister of Bukhara Khan, Imam Quli Khan. Nadir Devonbegi madrasah is located in the old city of Bukhara. It is located in the eastern part of the Lyab-i Hauz.

Currently, the madrasah is included in the national list of immovable property objects of the material and cultural heritage of Uzbekistan.

== History ==
Nadir Devonbegi madrasah was built by Nadir Devonbegi in 1622–1623 during the reign of Imam Quli Khan, a representative of the Ashtarkhanid dynasty that ruled the Bukhara Khanate. The madrasah had 71 rooms and was headed by Mulla Shamsiddin. Research scientist Abdusattor Jumanazarov studied a number of foundation documents related to this madrasah and provided information related to the madrasah. Two foundation documents related to the activities of this madrasah have been preserved. One of the endowment documents was copied during the reign of Amir Shahmurad, the emir of Bukhara. This foundation document was formalized on July 17, 1642. The document of the endowment contains the following information: "Hazrat Tagoyi Abdullah Khan built a brick and stone mosque, a two-story madrasah and a pool in a short period of time in the east of Sarrafon Guzari in Bukhara." In Nadir Devonbegi madrasah, one mudarris took classes and his annual salary was 500 tanga and 100 man of grain. Mudarris taught subjects such as furu fiqh and usul. The second foundation related to the activities of the madrasah was formalized in December 1810 during the reign of Amir Haydar of Bukhara. Some archival documents related to Nadir Devonbegi madrasah have been preserved, according to which the mufti taught in the madrasah and his annual salary was 2600 tanga. Currently, national music and folklore performances are held for tourists in the courtyard of the madrasah. In addition, handicraft workshops are also operating in the madrasah.

== Architecture ==
Originally built as a caravanserai, it was converted into a madrasah by the decision of the Khan. It does not have a porch, a mosque and a large classroom typical of madrasahs, the courtyard is surrounded by small two-story rooms on four sides. The doors to the rooms are decorated in the style of carving, and bars are installed on the pediment above the doors. The yard is paved with bricks. Head style facing the field. There is a pool in front. The roof is majestic and luxurious. Among the plant-like motifs, the image of the mythical huma bird seeking a groom and a grazing deer are depicted in bright colors on tile decorations. Arabic inscriptions are written on the edges and the book. The tip is twisted. The two-story, deep-arched peshaivan on the two side wings of the pediment is decorated with ornaments. Two muqarnas in the corners are combined with the patterns on the arches. The size of the madrasah is 52 by 49 metres (171 ft × 161 ft). Nadir Devonbegi madrasah has been repaired several times, its dome, archway and walls lost moisture and damaged cells were restored. With the efforts of the masters of Samarkand and Bukhara, the style of the head was re-polished.

== Literature ==
- Jumanazar, A. (2017). Buxoro taʼlim tizimi tarixi. Toshkent: Akademnashr. ISBN 978-9943-4728-2-2.
- Rajabov, K.; Inoyatov, S. (2016). Бухоро тарихи [History of Bukhara] (in Tajik). Tashkent: Tafakkur Publishing House. ISBN 978-9943-24-119-0.
