= Naryn (dish) =

Central Asian meat and noodle dish

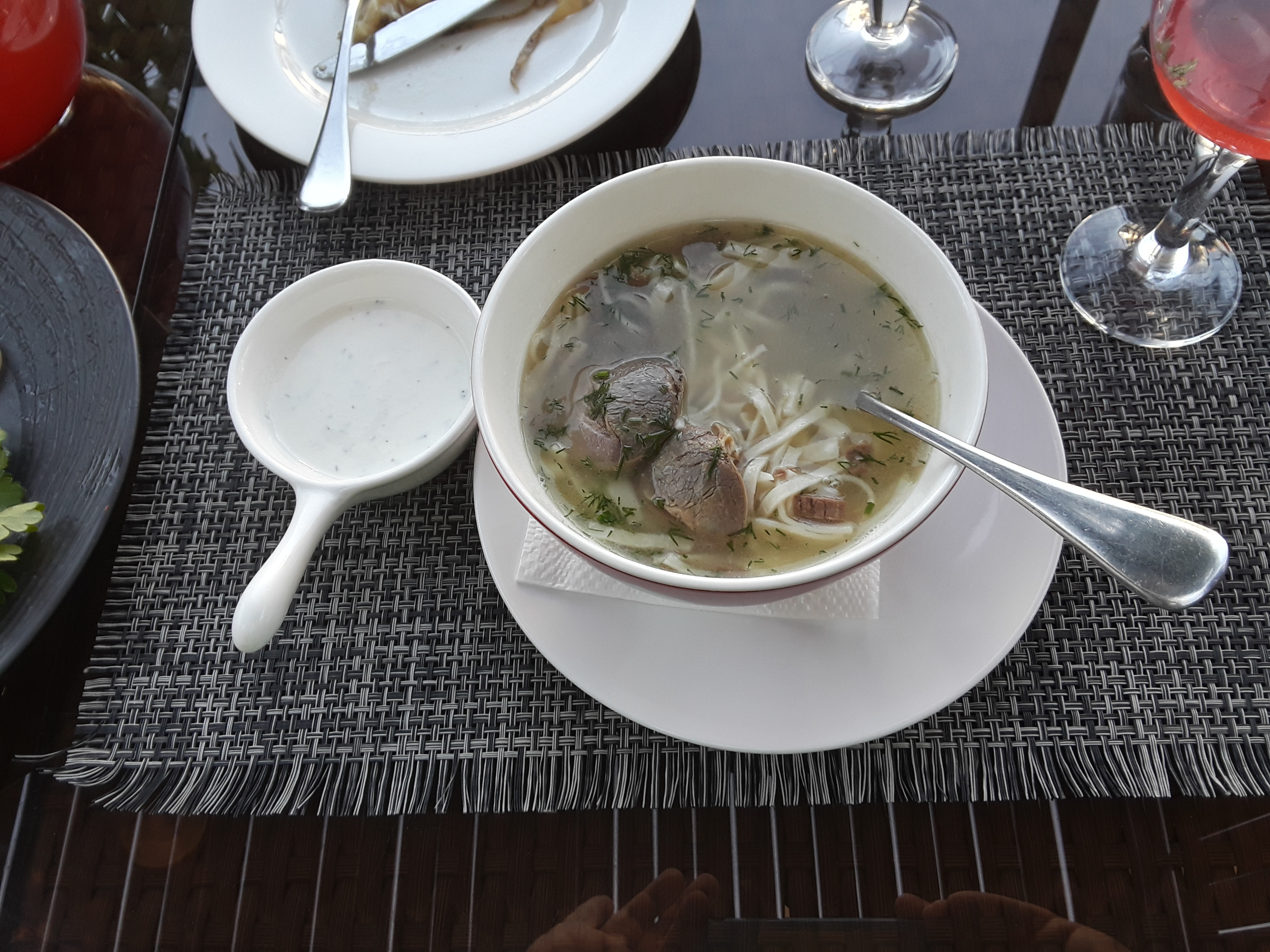
- Naryn soup with horse-meat qazı and noodles at a restaurant in Astana
- Course: Meat
- Place of origin: Kazakhstan, Kyrgyzstan, Uzbekistan, Turkmenistan
- Serving temperature: Hot
- Main ingredients: Meat, noodles

Naryn, neryn or norin (Kyrgyz: наaрын, romanized: naaryn; Kazakh: нарын, romanized: naryn; Uyghur: нерин, nërin; Uzbek: норин, norin; Russian: нaрын, romanized: naryn) is a Central Asian dish with horse meat and different kinds of noodles.

In Kyrgyz cuisine, naryn is made of finely chopped lamb meat (or horse meat) with onion sauce. Naryn with the addition of noodles is now called beshbarmak.

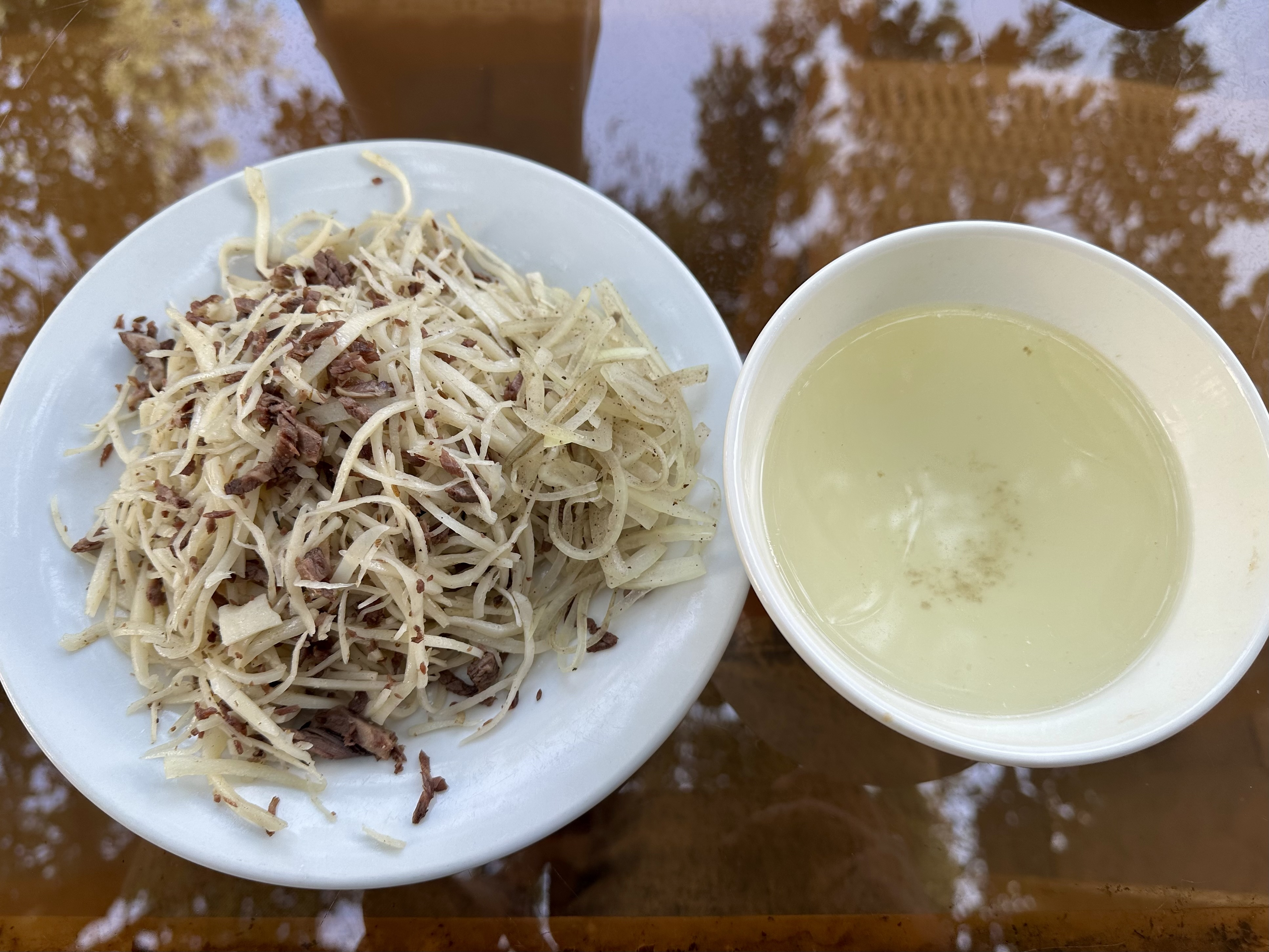
Uzbek naryn with broth

In Uzbek cuisine, naryn is a pasta dish made with fresh hand-rolled noodles and horse meat. Naryn can be served as a cold pasta dish (kuruk norin, or "dry" norin) or as a hot noodle soup (khul norin, or "wet" norin). Homemade pasta is rolled very thinly and cut into strips 2–4 mm wide and 50–70 mm long. The noodles are cooked in plain boiling water or often in a broth of horse meat. Horse meat is then shredded into the pasta. Naryn might be served on a lagan (plate) decorated with slices of horse meat sausage (qazı). The dish is served as a part of any extended meal after the samosa and before the plov (osh).

== See also ==
- List of Uzbek dishes
