= Dimlama =

Uzbek stew dish

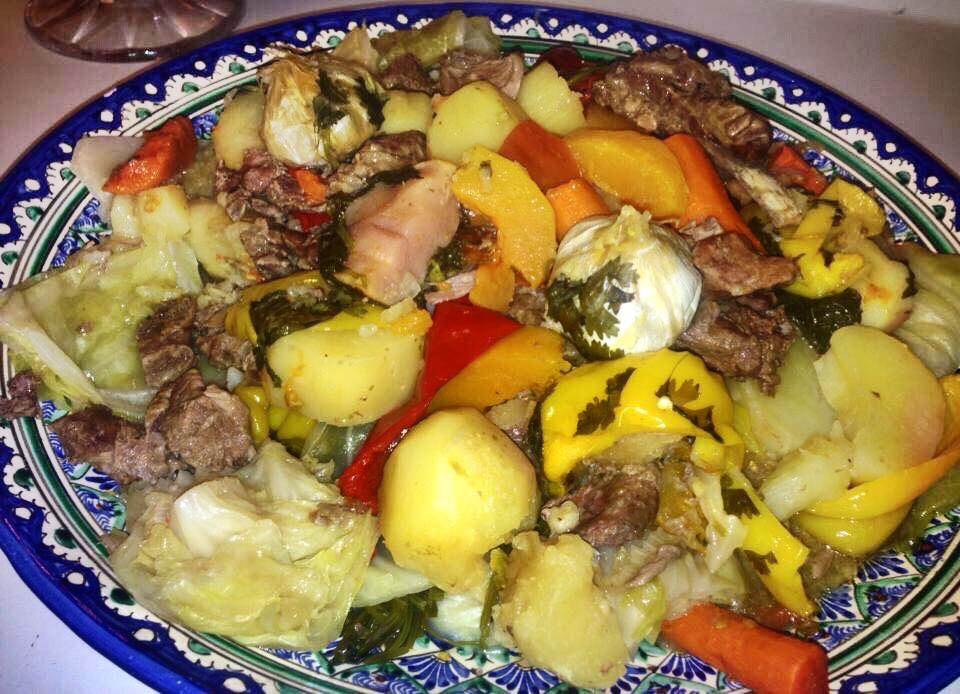
- Type: Stew
- Place of origin: Uzbekistan, Kyrgyzstan, Kazakhstan, Tajikistan
- Main ingredients: Meat (lamb, veal, or beef), potatoes, onions, vegetables, sometimes fruits

Dimlama or dymdama is an Uzbek stew made with various combinations of meat, potatoes, onions, vegetables, and sometimes fruits. Meat (lamb or sometimes veal or beef) and vegetables are cut into large pieces and placed in layers in a tightly sealed pot to simmer slowly in their own juices. Vegetables for dimlama may include, in addition to potatoes and onions, carrots, cabbage, eggplants, tomatoes, sweet peppers, spiced with garlic and a variety of herbs and condiments. Dimlama is usually cooked during spring and summer when there is a wide choice of vegetables. It is served on a large plate and eaten with a spoon.

== See also ==
- List of stews
- List of Uzbek dishes
