= Family of Shavkat Mirziyoyev =

Immediate family of the President of Uzbekistan

- Current region: Uzbekistan
- Members: Shavkat Mirziyoyev; Ziroat Mirziyoyeva; Saida Mirziyoyeva
- Connected members: Oybek Tursunov; Otabek Umarov
- Connected families: Samarkand clan Abdukadyr family

The family of Shavkat Mirziyoyev, 2nd President of Uzbekistan since 2016, includes members prominent in local politics and business. Becoming more and more relevant as the Mirziyoyev presidency continues, the family is alleged to have gained massive influence and wealth through nepotism and corruption.

== Immediate family ==
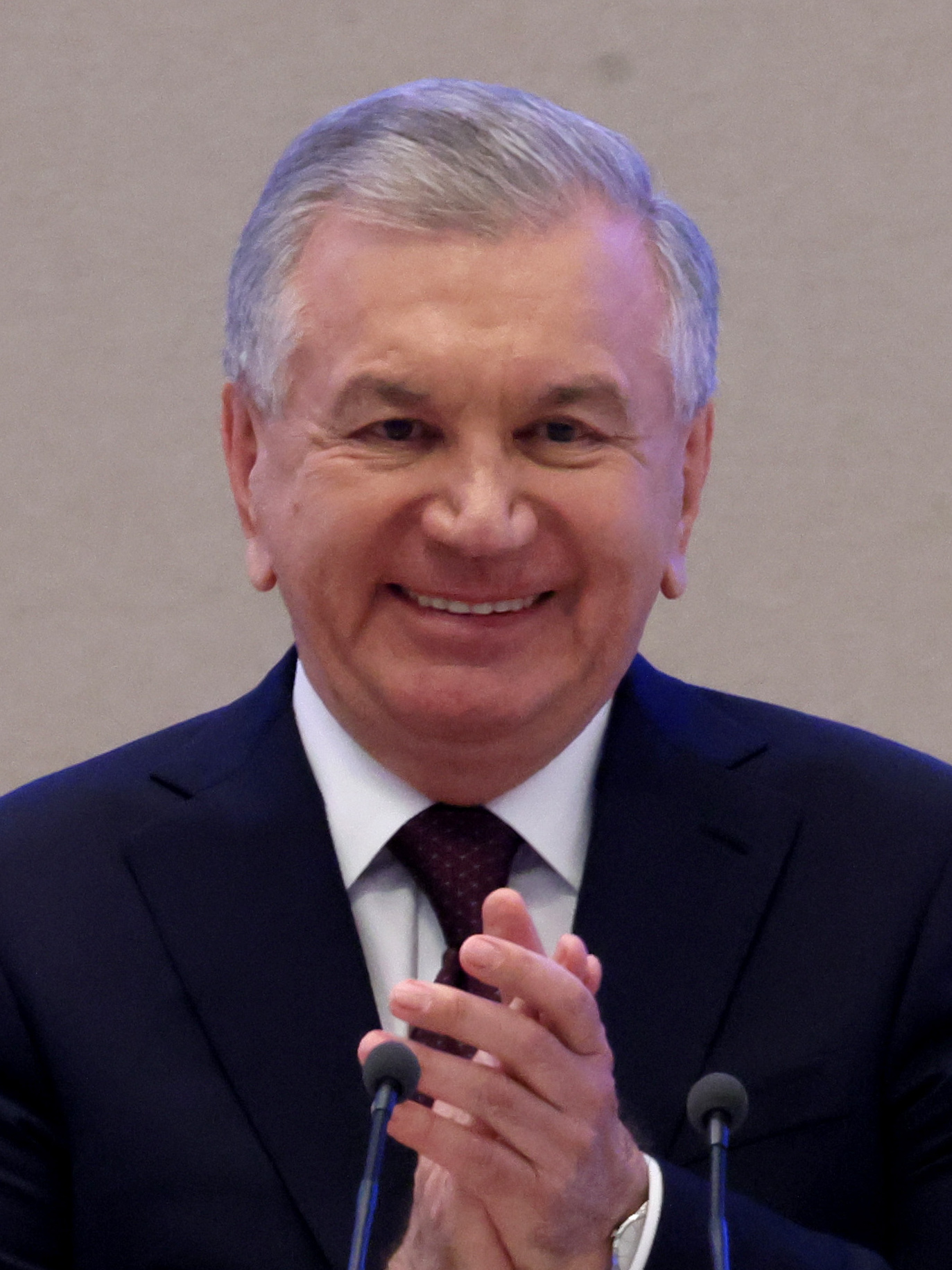
President Shavkat Mirziyoyev

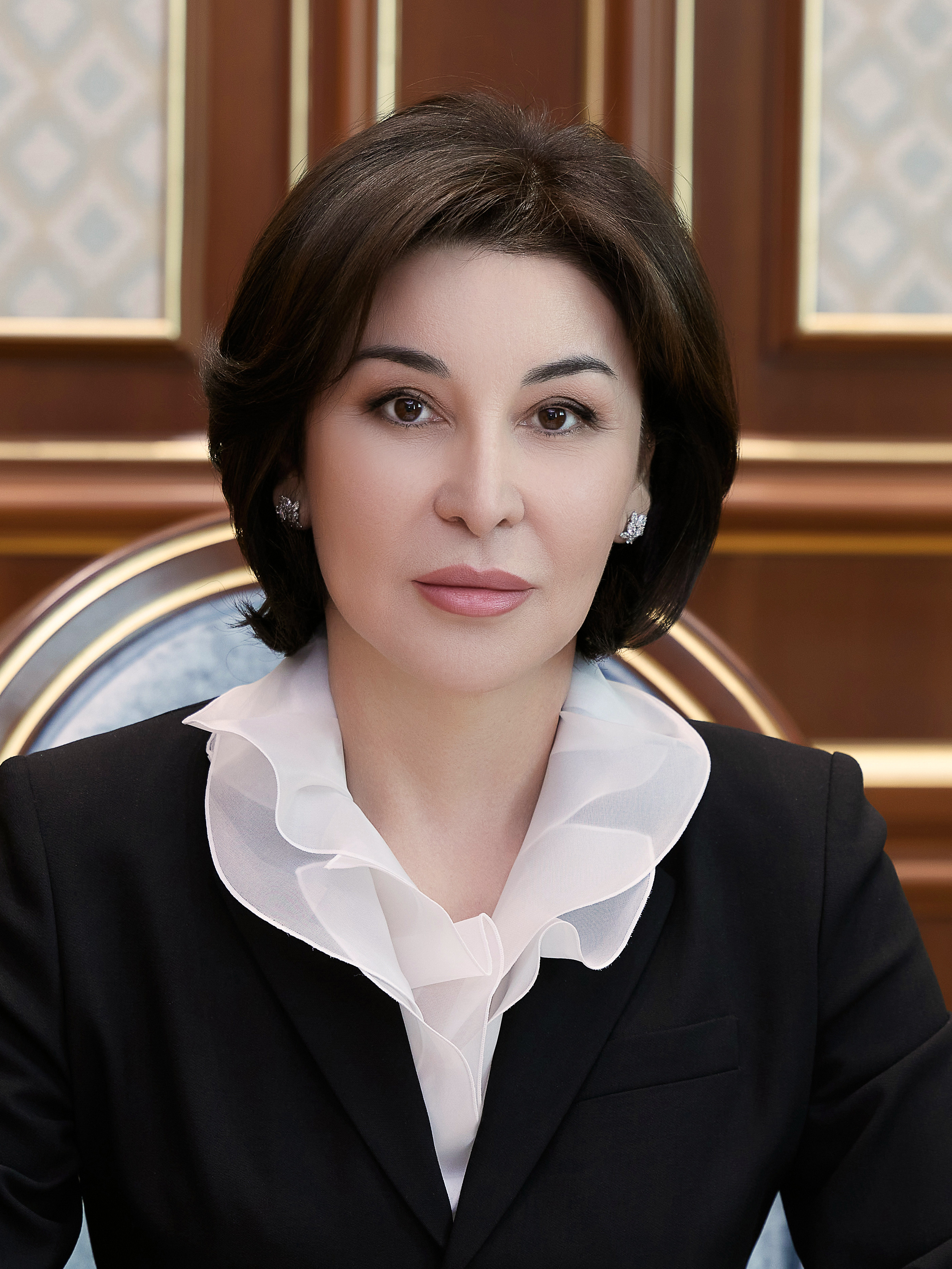
Mirziyoyev's wife, First Lady Ziroat Mirziyoyeva

=== Ziroat Mirziyoyeva ===
Ziroat Mirziyoyeva (née Hoshimova) is the wife of Shavkat Mirziyoyev, thus holding the title of First Lady since 2016. An engineer and economist born in 1964 Kokand, Ziroat Mirziyoyeva has been doing public service, participating in ceremonial events during her tenure as First Lady.

=== Children ===
Shavkat and Ziroat Mirziyoyev have three children: two daughters Saida and Shakhnoza, and one son Miralisher.

==== Saida Mirziyoyeva ====
Born in 1984, Saida Mirziyoyeva was First Assistant to the President from August 2023, called second most important political office in the Presidential Administration. In June 2025, she was made Head of the Presidential Administration, a re-established position which made her first in the institution.

==== Shakhnoza Mirziyoyeva ====
Born in 1986, Shakhnoza Mirziyoyeva is the incumbent First Deputy Director of the National Social Security Agency. She has headed a department at the Preschool Education Ministry until June 2023.

==== Miralisher Mirziyoyev ====
Born in 2009, Miralisher Mirziyoyev is the youngest child and only son of Shavkat and Ziroat Mirziyoyev.

=== Grandchildren ===
==== Miromon Tursunov ====
Named after Shavkat Mirziyoyev's father Miromon, Miromon Tursunov is the son of politician Saida Mirziyoyeva and businessman Oybek Tursunov.

== Sons-in-law ==
=== Oybek Tursunov ===
Married to Saida Mirziyoyeva, Oybek Tursunov is coined "one of the country's most influential businessmen".

=== Otabek Umarov ===
Named the de-facto head of President Mirziyoyev's security, businessman Otabek Umarov is Shakhnoza Mirziyoyeva's husband and thus Mirziyoyev's son-in-law.

Umarov's successful business ventures are always supported by different Presidential decrees and state backing, and the competitors of Umarov are pressured. Umarov is known to be closely associated with the allegedly criminal Abdukadyr family.

== Ancestry ==
Shavkat Mirziyoyev is of Uzbek origin. His father Miromon worked as a physician in the family's home Zomin District, Jizzakh Region. Mirziyoyev's mother died when Shavkat Mirziyoyev was only 9 years old.

=== Siblings ===
Shavkat Mirziyoyev has three sisters and one brother. They and their in-laws have been reported by Radio Free Europe to own many enterprises in different fields.

The eldest sister of Shavkat Mirziyoyev and thus the eldest of the family, Inobat Mirziyoyeva, raised him as a child. Mirziyoyeva has three children from her first marriage and two stepchildren from her marriage to Jizzakh businessman Toraboy Yarlakapov, the "King of Gas Stations".

== Other relatives ==
Inobat Mirziyoyeva's eldest daughter Gulnoza Omonova is the director of the №324 kindergarten in the Mirzo Ulugbek District of Tashkent, the leading children's institution of the city. She also is the owner of the English Home furniture company.

In April 2023, an Uzbek Service investigative report uncovered that Omonova's husband Najim Abdujabbarov was a major player in logistics and trade at Tashkent's contraband-rich Abu Sahiy Market. Omonova's younger sister Yulduz Omonova is a member of the Uzbek "cartel-like" car industry. Her father-in-law Oktam Maxmudjonov is a longtime associate of Shavkat Mirziyoyev and current owner of the FC Sogdiana football club.

== Summary table ==
Birth	Death	Image	Name	Relationship to Mirziyoyev	Office	Occupation	Ref.
?	?		Miromon Mirziyoyev	Father of Shavkat Mirziyoyev		phthisiologist	
?	?		Marifat Mirziyoyeva	Mother of Shavkat Mirziyoyev		nurse	
?			Inobat Mirziyoyeva	Older sister of Shavkat Mirziyoyev	nurse	politician	
1957			Shavkat Mirziyoyev	Himself	President of Uzbekistan (since 2016); Prime Minister of Uzbekistan (2003–2016)	politician	
1964			Ziroat Mirziyoyeva	Wife of Shavkat Mirziyoyev	First Lady of Uzbekistan (since 2016)	economist	
1984			Saida Mirziyoyeva	Daughter of Shavkat Mirziyoyev	Head of the Presidential Administration (since 2025); First Assistant to the President (2023–2025)	economist	
1986			Shaxnoza Mirziyoyeva	Daughter of Shavkat Mirziyoyev	Deputy Chair of the National Paralympic Committee (since 2024)	jurist	
2009			Miralisher Mirziyoyev	Son of Shavkat Mirziyoyev			
?			Oybek Tursunov	Son-in-law of Shavkat Mirziyoyev	Deputy Chair of the Presidential Administration (since 2017)	entrepreneur	
1984			Otabek Umarov	Son-in-law of Shavkat Mirziyoyev	Deputy Head of the State Security Service (since 2018)	economist	
?			Toraboy Yarlakapov	Brother-in-law of Shavkat Mirziyoyev, husband of Inobat Mirziyoyeva		entrepreneur	
?			Gulnoza Omonova	Niece of Shavkat Mirziyoyev, daughter of Inobat Mirziyoyeva	Director of №324 Kindergarten		
?			Oktam Maxmudjonov	Father-in-law of Gulnoza Omonova	FC Sogdiana Owner (since 2018)		

== See also ==
- Presidency of Shavkat Mirziyoyev
