= Presidency of Shavkat Mirziyoyev =

Tenure of the Uzbek president since 2016

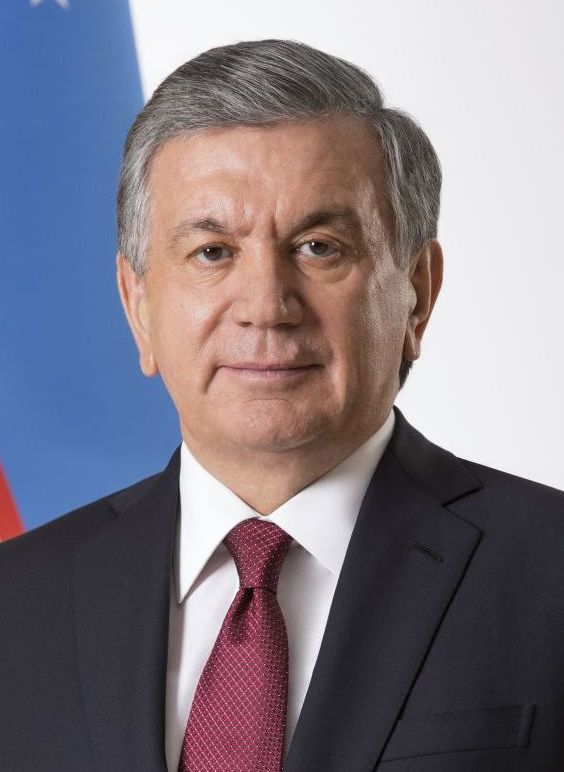
- Official portrait, 2018
- Presidency of Shavkat Mirziyoyev; 14 December 2016 – present
- President: Shavkat Mirziyoyev
- Party: Independent
- Election: 2016; 2021; 2023
- Seat: Kuksaroy Presidential Palace
- Standard of the President

The Presidency of Shavkat Mirziyoyev refers to the tenure of Shavkat Mirziyoyev as the 2nd President of Uzbekistan. His term began on 14 December 2016, after serving as prime minister and acting president following the death of his predecessor, Islam Karimov. In accordance with the Constitution of Uzbekistan, his mandate will last until 2030, following his re-election in 2023.

== Mirziyoyev's background and 2016 election ==
Shavkat Miromonovich Mirziyoyev (Uzbek Cyrillic: Шавкат Миромонович Мирзиёев) was born in the Jizzakh Region of the Uzbek SSR on 24 July 1957 as one of 5 children that his father Miromon had with his wife. From 1977–1981, Mirziyoyev studied at the Tashkent Institute of Irrigation and Melioration with a Ph.D in Technological Sciences. He began his political career in 1996 when he was appointed as Hakim of the Jizzakh Region. He later became the Hakim of Samarqand Region in September 2001 and would keep this position until 2003. He was appointed by President Islam Karimov as Prime Minister, to form a new cabinet to replace Oʻtkir Sultonov. He served in this position for 13 years until he took the post of acting president after the death of President Karimov in September 2016. Presidential elections were held in Uzbekistan on 4 December 2016 with Mirziyoyev winning 88.6% of the popular vote.

He was sworn in as President of Uzbekistan on 14 December 2016 during a ceremony in the Supreme Assembly, which coincided with its regular session. The ceremony was officiated by the Chairman Mirzo-Ulugbek Abdusalomov of the Uzbek Central Election Commission. Miziyoyev placed his hand on the country's Constitution and Quran as he took the oath of office.

== Domestic policy ==
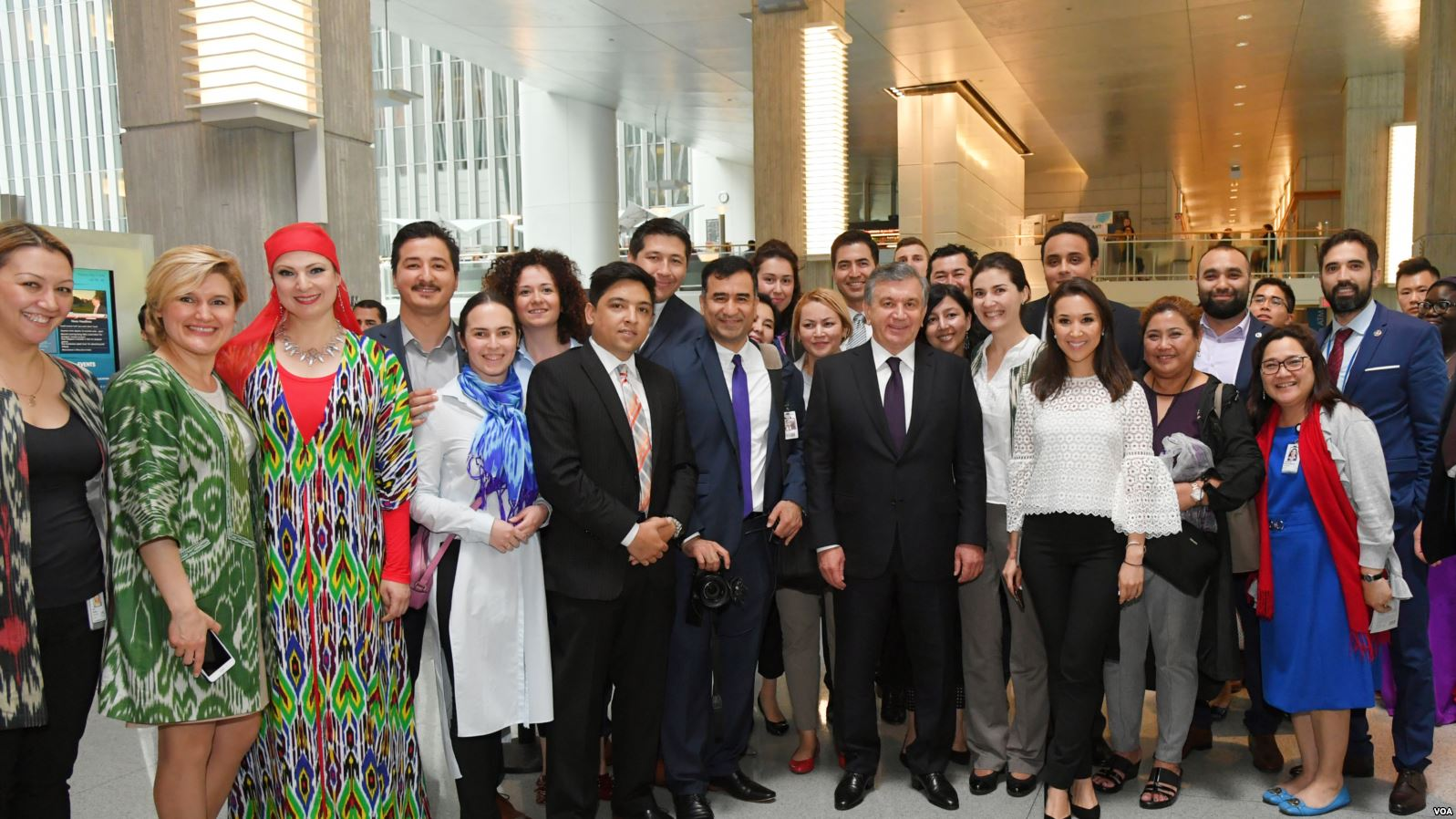
Mirziyoyev with members of the Uzbek diaspora in the United States.

=== Appointments and removals ===
Mirziyoyev worked hard to remove any controversial trace of the Karimov administration in his presidency. This also worked strategically, as some of Mirziyoyev's political adversaries such as Rustam Azimov and Rustam Inoyatov were opposed to many of his planned reforms. This period in his presidency was used to consolidate his power and remove all power struggles in the country. He appointed Abdusalom Azizov to head the defense ministry in September 2017, to succeed the long-time defense minister Qobul Berdiyev, who was seen as a Karimov loyalist. Azizov himself would be sacked from this position in February 2019, being transferred to the State Security Service to lead it after its head, Lieutenant General Ikhtiyor Abdullayev, was accused of tapping President Mirziyoyev's phone.

=== Economy ===
There are many visible results of Mirziyoyev's reforms, which included the creation of more than 300,000 jobs and an increase in exports. Mirziyoyev secured 10 billion dollars in areas such as infrastructure, alternative energy and agriculture following talks with Crown Prince Mohammed bin Zayed in March 2019. In October 2020, he approved a list of state-owned properties and enterprises that are to be sold to the Uzbek private sector as a means of speeding up the privatization process in Uzbekistan.

=== Military policy ===
Over the course of his presidency, he expanded educational opportunities in the Armed Forces of Uzbekistan establishing/reforming the following institutions: the Academy of the Armed Forces of Uzbekistan, the Military Institute of Information and Communication Technologies and Communications, the Military Medical Academy, and the Higher Military Aviation School. Since he came to power, the armed forces had been involved in rapidly re-arming its military with more modern equipment. In November 2017, at the initiative of President Mirziyoyev, the State Committee for Defense Industry was created serving as an authorized body for the management of the military–industrial complex.

=== Coronavirus pandemic ===
Mirziyoyev was responsible for handling of the COVID-19 pandemic in Uzbekistan in 2020. He has been noted for being responsible for trying to coordinate efforts within Central Asia to combat the crisis. He launched the "Safe Travel Guaranteed" campaign as a way to reinvigorate the tourism sector, which included a compensation package for those infected with the virus while on holiday. In July, he reprimanded health minister Alisher Shodmonov and Mayor of Tashkent Jahongir Artikhojayev for failing to stop the spread of the virus. In August, he awarded honorary titles and medals to workers in healthcare and science who were on the frontlines of the pandemic. Earlier that month, he has instructed the government to ease lockdown measures step by step.

=== 2022 Karakalpak protests ===
On 1 July 2022 protests broke out in the autonomous region of Karakalpakstan over proposed amendments to the Constitution of Uzbekistan which would have ended Karakalpakstan's status as an autonomous region of Uzbekistan and right to secede from Uzbekistan via referendum. They were brutally suppressed, at least 18 people were killed.

== Foreign policy ==
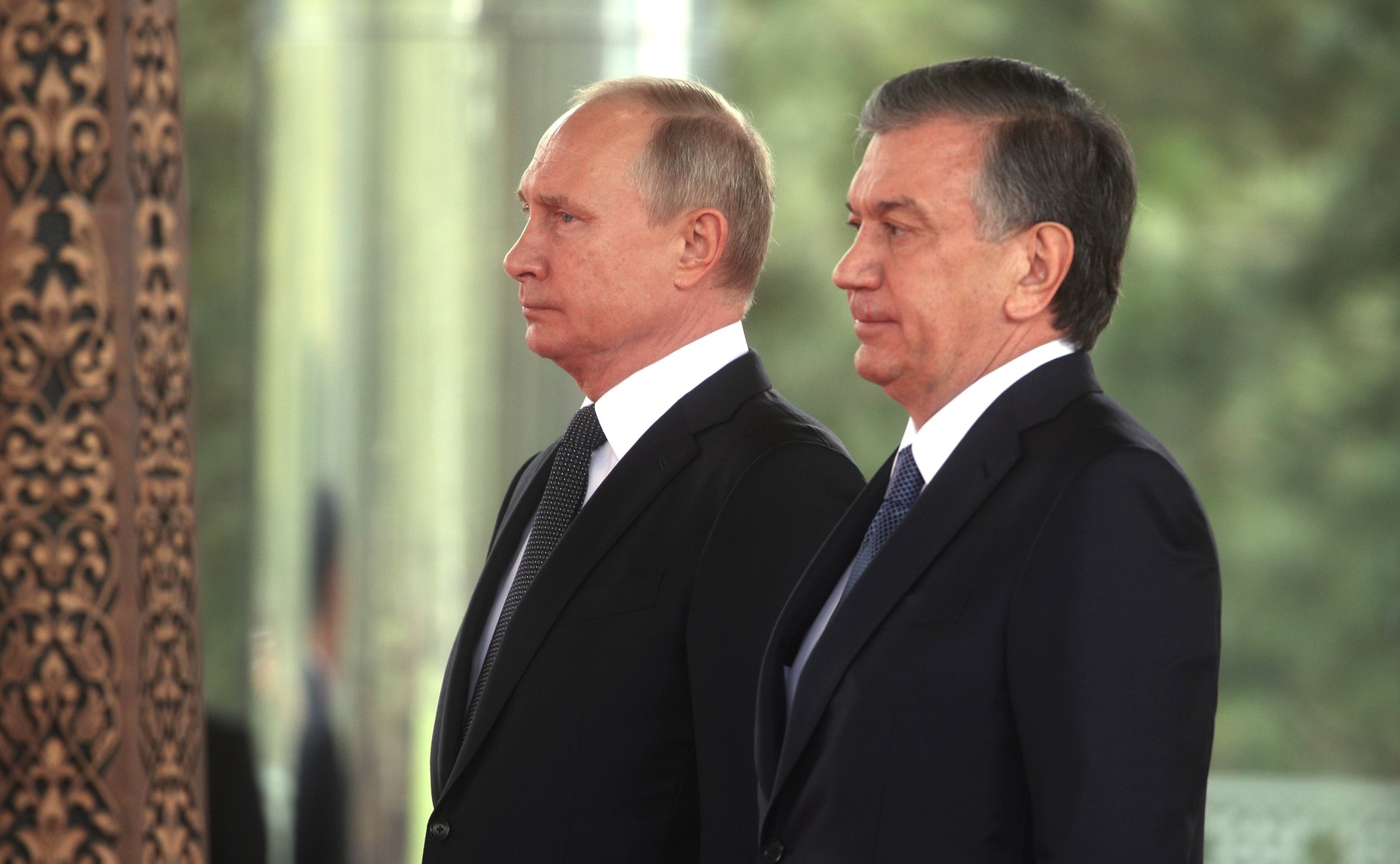
Mirziyoyev with Vladimir Putin.

Unlike Karimov, Mirziyoyev has moved to a more open foreign policy with Uzbekistan's neighbors, especially with the gradual improvement of relations with Kyrgyzstan and Tajikistan. Mirziyoyev has made it routine to visit foreign countries on state visits, with his first official foreign visit being to Ashgabat, Turkmenistan in March 2017. Mirziyoyev planned to visit 36 countries throughout 2019, some of which have never seen an official visit by an Uzbek president.

Over the course of his presidency, many foreign leaders visited Tashkent on state visits, including Kazakh President Kassym-Jomart Tokayev, Turkish President Recep Tayyip Erdoğan, Russian President Vladimir Putin, and Belarusian President Alexander Lukashenko.

=== Relations with Kyrgyzstan and Tajikistan ===
On 5 September 2017, Mirziyoyev conducted a state visit to Kyrgyzstan, the first visit of its kind since 2000. A similar historic first visit was made in March 2018 to Dushanbe, Tajikistan. These were part of a bigger effort to improve relations with these two countries, which were riddled with tension primarily due to border disputes with those countries. In January 2017, regular commercial flights between Tashkent and Dushanbe resumed for the first time in 25 years.

=== Other former Soviet republics ===
On 18 December 2020, he is chaired the summit of the Commonwealth of Independent States in Tashkent, likely through virtual means. That year was the first time that Uzbekistan assumed the presidency of the Council of Heads of State of the CIS. Congratulating Azeri President Ilham Aliyev on the victory in the 2020 Nagorno-Karabakh War, he pledged that Uzbekistan will to contribute to this process of restoration of the occupied territories, including mosques, and cultural sites. Mirziyoyev's former press secretary claimed that the 2021 Kyrgyzstan–Tajikistan conflict was "regulated as a result of personal intervention of President Shavkat Mirziyoyev."

=== Role in Afghanistan ===
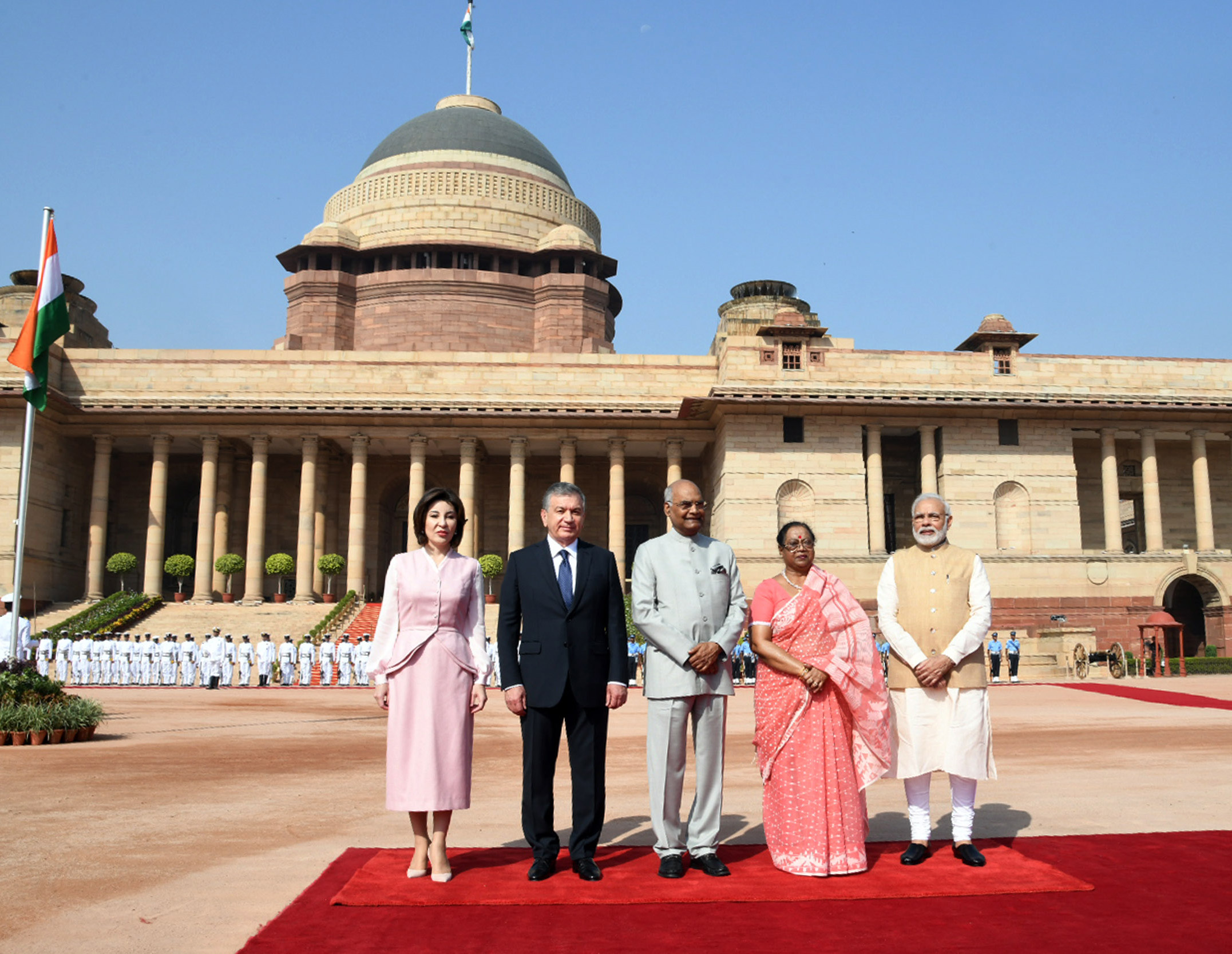
From left to right: Ziroat Mirziyoyeva, President Mirziyoyev, Ram Nath Kovind, Savita Kovind and Narendra Modi.

Mirziyoyev has made sure that Uzbekistan plays an important role in the peace talks between the Government of Afghanistan and the Taliban. In June of that year, the Uzbek foreign ministry, established diplomatic contacts with the terrorist organization. In August 2018, Mirziyoyev requested successfully that a Taliban delegation visit Tashkent to discuss Uzbekistan's role in the guaranteeing of peace in Afghanistan. In an address to his counterparts at a Commonwealth of Independent States summit in Dushanbe, Mirziyoyev extensively spoke of the instability in Afghanistan and the need to stop equipped and financed terrorist cells from leaving Syria and Iraq to go fight in Central Asia. In April 2019, he met with Zalmay Khalilzad, United States Special Representative for Afghanistan Reconciliation to discussed various avenues to take in order to stabilize the reconstruction of the Afghan economy. During his speech to the Seventy-fifth session of the United Nations General Assembly in 2020, during which he delivered his address in the Uzbek language (the first time that the language has been used in the UN), President Mirziyoyev discussed the "need to establish at the UN a Permanent Committee that will listen to the hopes and aspirations of the Afghan people".

=== Fight against terror ===
==== Operation Mehr ====
Mirziyoyev's government began Operation Mehr (also known as Operation Compassion) in 2019 to return noncombatant citizens from camps in northeast Syria held by the Syrian Democratic Forces. On 10 October 2019, in accordance his instructions, 64 children were returned from Iraq to Tashkent as part of this operation. This was repeated during Ramadan in 2021.

== Cabinet ==
The current Prime Minister is Abdulla Aripov, who has designated the following members of the cabinet of ministers:

Minister title	Name
Minister of Economy and Industry	Botir Xoʻjayev
Minister of Finance	Anvar Qoʻchqorov
Minister of Transport	Achilbay Ramat
Ministry of Labor and Social Protection of Population	Sherzod Qudbiyev
Ministry of Higher and Secondary Special Education	Inom Madzhidov
Ministry of Public Education	Sherzod Shermatov
Minister of Pre-school Education	Agrepina Shin
Ministry of Foreign Economic Relations, Investments, and Trade	Sardor Umurzakov
Ministry of Internal Affairs	Pulat Bobojonov
Minister of Energy	Alisher Sultanov
Minister of Water Management	Shavkat Khamrayev
Minister of Housing and Communal Services	Muzaffar Saliev
Ministry of Public Health	Alisher Shadmanov
Ministry of Innovative Development	Ibrohim Abdurahmonov
Ministry of Foreign Affairs	Abdulaziz Kamilov
Minister of Culture and Sports	Bakhtior Saifullaev
Minister of Defense	Bakhodir Kurbanov
Minister of Information Technology and Communications	Azim Ahmedkhadzhayev
Ministry of Agriculture and Water Resources	Zoir Mirzayev
Minister of Construction	Abdukahhar Tuhtaev
Minister of Physical Education and Sport	Shoacram Isroilov
Ministry of Emergency Situations	Tursinhan Xudayberganov
Minister of Justice	Ruslanbek Davletov

== Residence ==
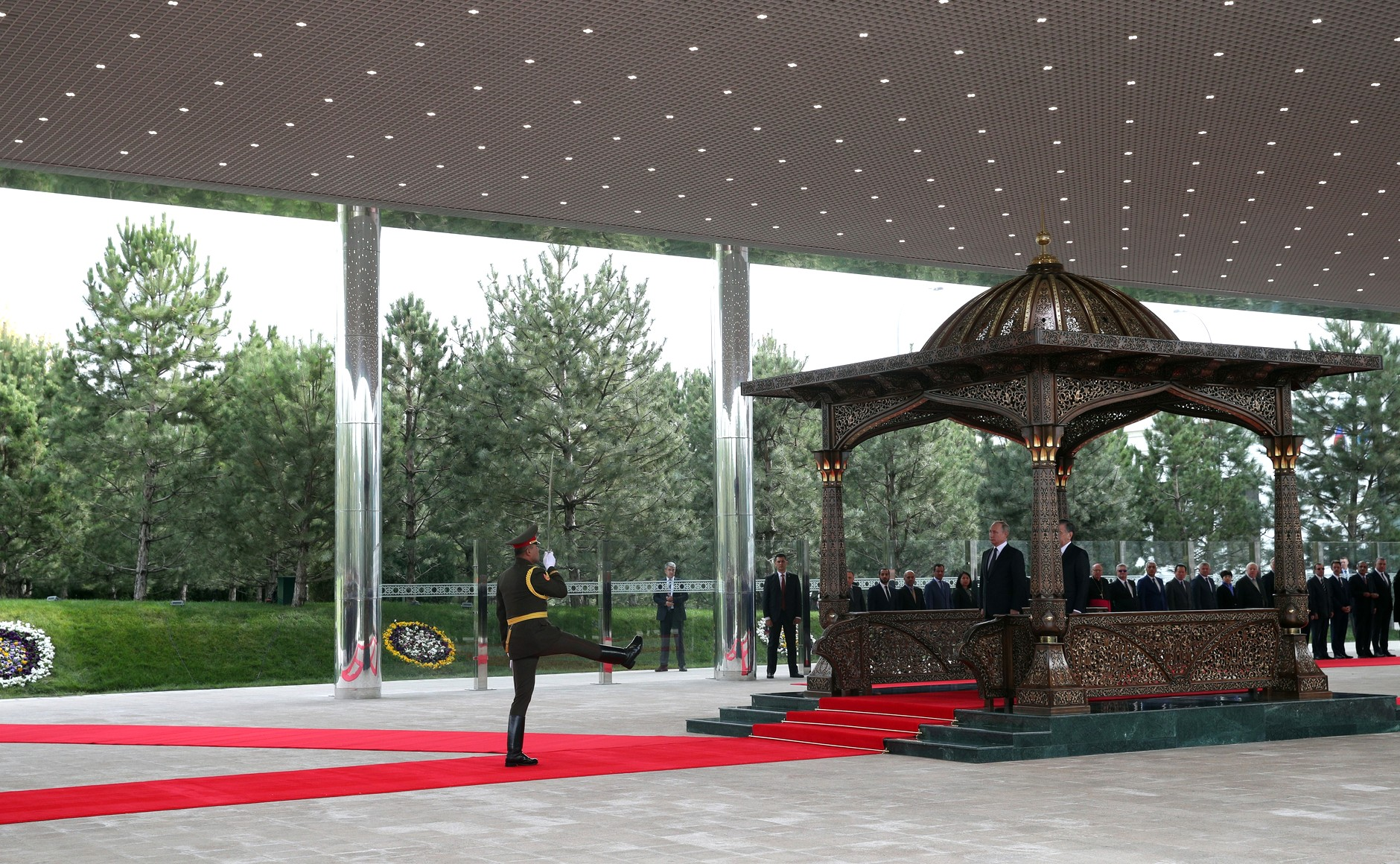
Modern state arrival ceremonies for foreign leaders are held in Kuksaroy.

Prior to 2016, the Ok Saroy Presidential Palace served as the official residence and workplace of the Uzbek President. In 2016, the title official residence was moved to the Kuksaroy Presidential Palace by order of President Mirziyoyev. Mirziyoyev has also used another residence located in the Qibray District of Tashkent which contains a presidential highway and compound. The interior is rumored to contain blue marble slabs from Argentina and Swarovski crystals.

== Recognition ==
- November 2017 – He given the title of Honored Citizen of Seoul
- April 2018 – He was awarded a Prize “For Merits to Eurasia” by the Government of Turkey
- May 2018 – He was nominated for the Nobel Peace Prize by Olimzhon Tukhtanazarov of his own Liberal Democratic Party.
- December 2018 – He was named the "Asian of the Year of 2018" by the Asia Journalist Association (AJA).
- March 2018 – He was awarded the StrategEast Westernization Award
