= Uzbekistan National News Agency =

Uzbekistan news agency

Agency overview
- Formed: 5 February 1992
- Headquarters: Tashkent
- Agency executives: Andusaid Ko'chimov, Director; Xushnud Xudayberdiyev, Deputy Director
- Parent agency: Agency of Information and Mass Communications under the Presidential Administration of Uzbekistan
- Website: https://uza.uz/uz

Uzbekistan National News Agency also known as UzA is a government-run news agency based in Tashkent, Uzbekistan publishing news in the Uzbek, Russian, English, French, German, Spanish, Arabic, Kazakh and Chinese languages. It is the largest news agency in Central Asia. It is under the Agency of Information and Mass Communications under the Presidential Administration of Uzbekistan.

== History ==
In the autumn of 1918, a branch of ROSTAopened in Tashkent. Several years later, this branch was transformed into the Uzbek Telegraph Agency (UzTAG) as part of TASS. UzA was established on 5 February 1992 by decree of the President.
