= Karim Kamalov =

Uzbekistani politician (1954–2020)

Governor (Khokim) of Bukhara Region (acting)
- In office 29 February 2020 – 22 August 2020
- Preceded by: Uktam Barnoev

Mayor of Bukhara
- In office August 2017 – 29 February 2020

Mayor of Bukhara
- In office 1997–2011

Personal details
- Born: 1954
- Died: 22 August 2020 (age 66) Tashkent, Uzbekistan

Karim Jamalovich Kamolov (1954 – 22 August 2020), was an Uzbek politician. He served as the Hokim, or Mayor, of Bukhara from 1997 until 2011 and again from August 2017 until February 2020. On 29 February 2020, Kamalov was appointed acting Khokim of Bukhara Region, a gubernatorial office he held until his death on 22 August 2020, from COVID-19 during the COVID-19 pandemic in Uzbekistan. The Khokim is the equivalent of a regional governor in Uzbekistan.

Kamalov also served as a deputy in the Legislative Chamber of Uzbekistan from 1999 until 2004, representing the 49th district, which is based in the city of Bukhara.

Kamalov was born in 1954. He graduated from the Bukhara Engineering and Technological Institute. Kamalov was the recipient of the national Mekhnat Shukhrati (awarded on 29 August 2019) and Dustlik awards.

Governor Kamalov was diagnosed with COVID-19 on 25 July 2020. He died from COVID-19 at AKFA Medline Hospital in Tashkent, Uzbekistan on 22 August 2020, at the age of 66.

Kamalov was the latest in a series of Uzbek government officials to be stricken with COVID-19. Yorkin Tursunov, the Deputy Minister of Finance, also died from COVID-19 on 28 July 2020. Uktam Barnoev, the Deputy Prime Minister of Uzbekistan and another former Khokim (Governor) of the Bukhara Region, also tested positive for coronavirus and died on 20 September.
