= List of Hokims of the Samarkand Region =

A Hokim (UZB. Hokim, ҳokim ) is The head of the local executive authority in the Samarkand Region in Uzbekistan. According to paragraph 15 of Article 93 of the Constitution, the regional governor and the city Hokim of Tashkent are appointed and dismissed by the President of the Republic of Uzbekistan on the proposal of the Prime Minister.

== Hokims of the Samarkand Region ==
- Pulat Abdurakhmanov (January 1992 – November 1995)
- Alisher Mardiev (November 1995 – October 1998)
- "Erkin Ruziev (October 1998 – September 2001)
- Shavkat Mirziyoyev (September 11, 2001-11 December 2003)
- Rustam Kholmurodov (December 16, 2003 – September 7, 2004)
- Mamarizo Nurmuratov (September 7, 2004 – December 2006)
- Azam Bakhromov (December 2006 – April 4, 2008)
- Uktam Barnoyev (April 4, 2008 – December 17, 2010)
- Zoir Mirzaev (December 17, 2010 – December 15, 2016)
- Akbar Shukurov (December 15, 2016 – Present)

== See also ==
- List of Hokims of the Tashkent Region
