= 2017 in Uzbekistan =

- Decades: 1990s; 2000s; 2010s; 2020s
- See also: Other events of 2017; Timeline of Uzbek history

This article lists events from the year 2017 in Uzbekistan

== Incumbents ==
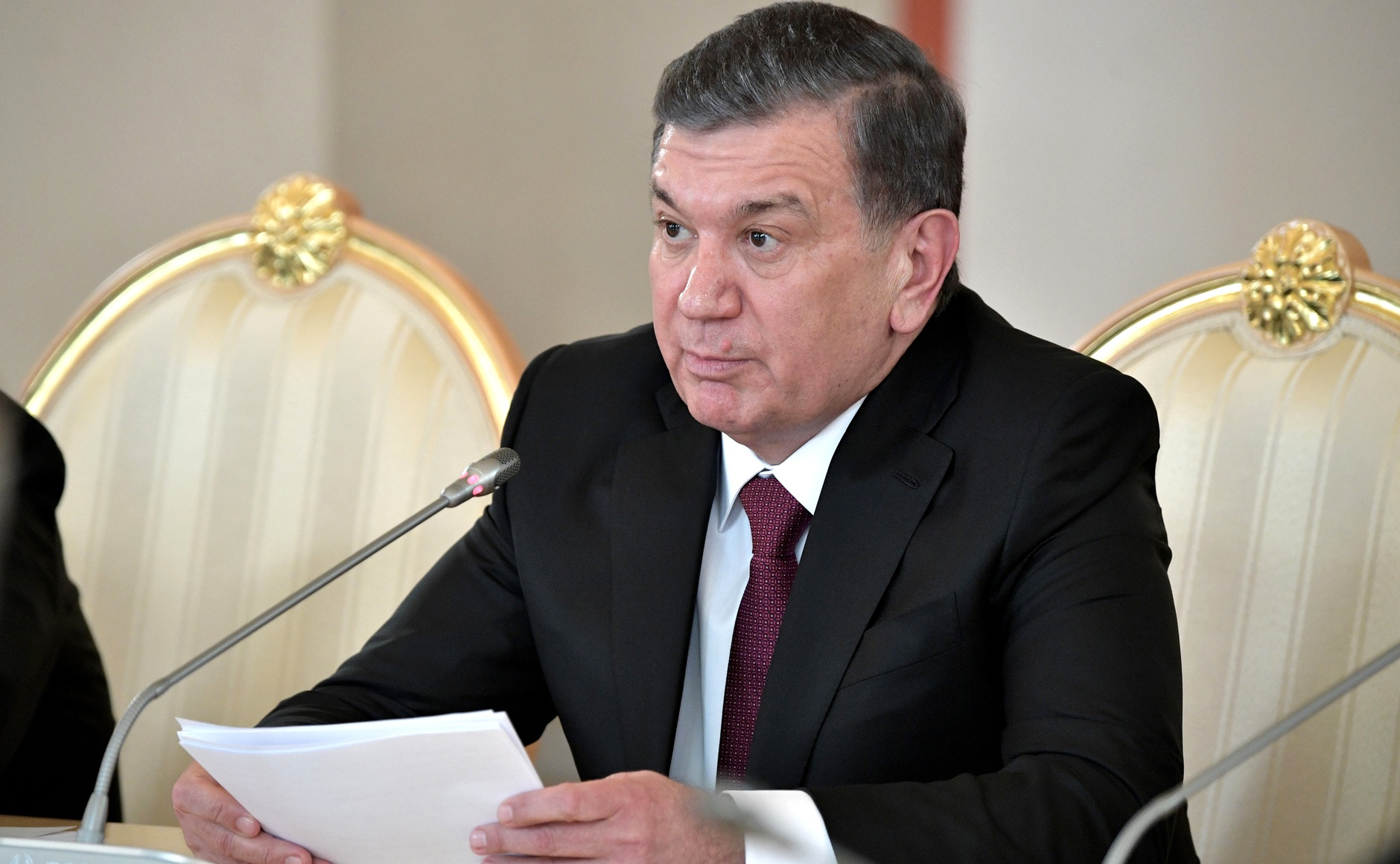
Shavkat Mirziyoyev.

- President: Shavkat Mirziyoyev
- Prime Minister: Abdulla Aripov

== Events ==
=== September ===
- September 16-17 - Nursultan Nazarbayev becomes the first foreign leader to visit President Mirziyoyev Tashkent.

=== December ===
- December 22 - 2018 is declared the Year of Proactive Entrepreneurship, Innovative Ideas And Technologies by Shavkat Mirziyoyev.
