= Ergash Shoismatov =

Uzbekistani politician

- Эргаш Шоисматов

Deputy Prime Minister of Uzbekistan
- In office August 2012 – September 2016 Serving with Rustam Azimov
- President: Islam Karimov; Nigmatilla Yuldashev (Acting)
- Prime Minister: Shavkat Mirziyoyev
- Preceded by: Abdulla Aripov
- Succeeded by: Abdulla Aripov

Personal details
- Born: 1951 (age 74–75) Tashkent, Uzbek SSR, Soviet Union

Ergash Rahmatullayevich Shoismatov (Russified form Shaismatov is also used) was the Deputy Prime Minister of Uzbekistan between 2012 and 2016. He was born on 1951 and is a graduate of Tashkent Polytechnical Institute.

On 30 August 2006 Shoismatov announced that the Uzbek government and an international consortium consisting of state-run Uzbekneftegaz, LUKoil Overseas, Petronas, Korea National Oil Corporation, and China National Petroleum Corporation had signed a production-sharing agreement to explore and develop oil and gas fields in the Aral Sea, saying, "The Aral Sea is largely unknown, but it holds a lot of promise in terms of finding oil and gas. There is risk, of course, but we believe in the success of this unique project." The consortium was created in September 2005.

== See also ==
- Islam Karimov
- Shavkat Mirziyoyev
