= Dilnozaxon Kattaxonova =

Uzbekistan politician

Dilnozaxon Kattaxonova Дилнозахон Каттахонова
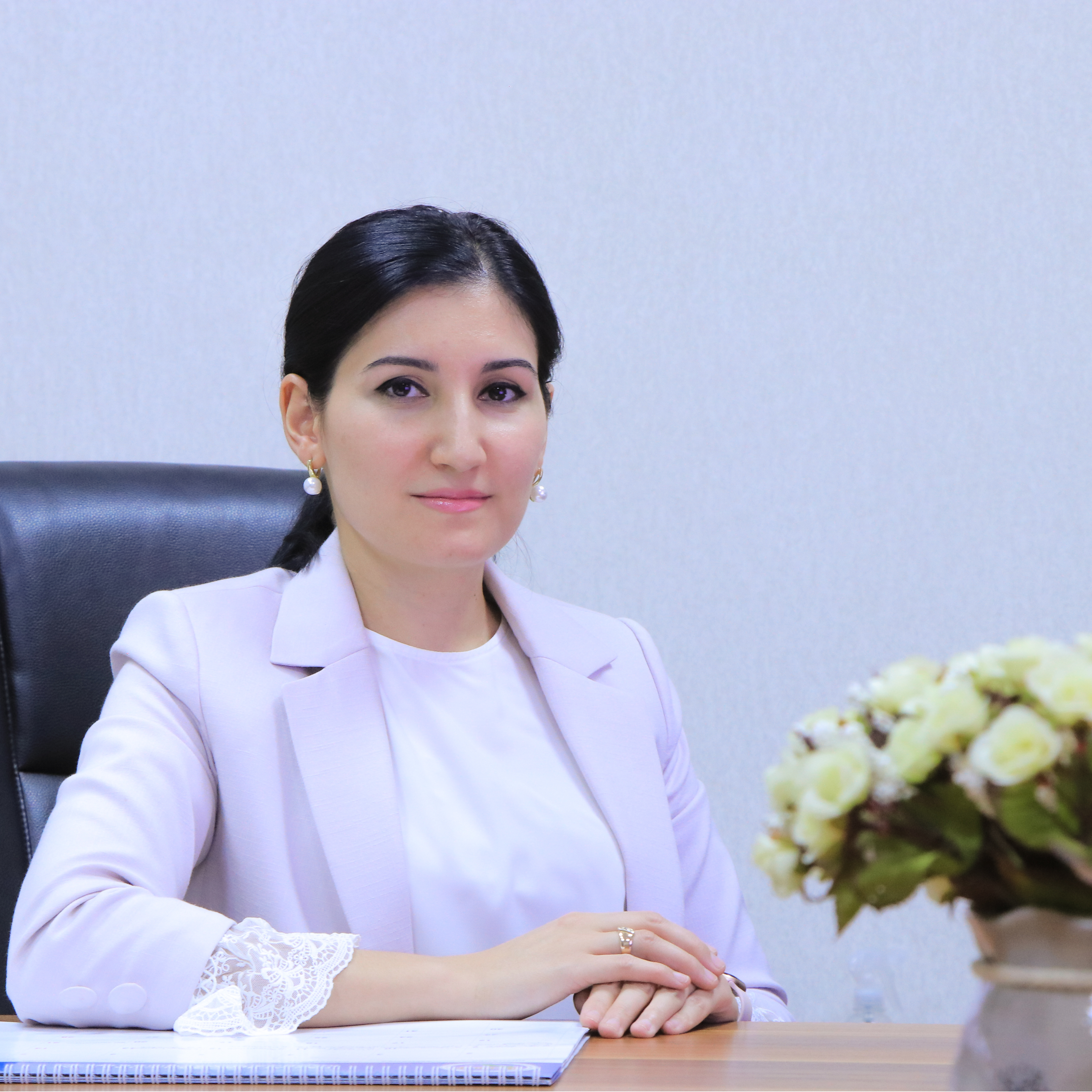

Deputy Prime Minister of Uzbekistan
- Incumbent
- Assumed office 10 July 2026
- President: Shavkat Mirziyoyev
- Prime Minister: Abdulla Aripov

Personal details
- Born: Kattaxonova Dilnozaxon Sobir qizi 2 July 1991 (age 35) Tashkent, Uzbek SSR, USSR
- Education: National University of Uzbekistan
- Awards: State awards named after "Do'stlik", "Zulfiya"

Dilnozaxon Kattaxonova (born 2 July 1991) is an Uzbek politician who has served as Deputy Prime Minister of Uzbekistan since July 2026. Previously, Kattaxonova worked as First Deputy Director of Youth Affairs Agency and Chairperson of the Children's organization of Kamalak which is the largest school students' union (2018-2020). In June 2021, Kattaxonova was awarded the Do'stlik State Prize by President of Uzbekistan. She is also Doctor of Philosophy in Political Science.

== Career ==
She graduated with a bachelor's degree from National University of Uzbekistan named after Mirzo Ulugbek in 2014. In 2016, she completed her master's degree at National University of Uzbekistan. From 2014 to 2016, she worked as a leading specialist in the Department of Social and Legal Projects of the Central Council of the Kamolot Youth Social Movement. From 2016 to 2017, she served as the chief specialist in the Department for the Development of International Relations and Support for Non-Governmental Non-Profit Organizations of the Women's Committee of Uzbekistan. On July 5, 2017, at the meeting of the Republican Council on Youth Issues, she was elected as the Deputy Chairwoman of the Central Council of the Youth Union of Uzbekistan. From 2018 to 2020, she served as the Head of the Children's Organization of Kamalak. Since 2018, she has been an independent researcher at the Academy of Public Administration under the President of the Republic of Uzbekistan. In March 2022, she received a PhD diploma. On July 10, 2020, she was appointed as the Deputy Director of the newly established Agency for Youth Affairs of the Republic of Uzbekistan. On December 20, 2023, she was appointed as the First Deputy Director of the Agency for Youth Affairs.

== Awards ==
She was one of the first to be awarded the Zulfiya State Prize. In 2020, she was included in the list of Top-40 promising leaders in government institutions, as well as in the Top-35 women in state and public administration. In 2021, she was listed among the Top-40 women working in state structures, institutions, and large public organizations. In 2021, she was awarded the "Maʼnaviyat aʼlochisi" medal of the Uzbekistan National Guard and the "Xalqlar do'stligi" medal from the Committee on Interethnic Relations and Friendly Ties with Foreign Countries under the Government of Uzbekistan. On June 30, 2021, she was awarded the "Do'stlik" award by the President of the Republic of Uzbekistan.
