= Ziroat Mirziyoyeva =

First Lady of Uzbekistan since 2016

- Зироат Мирзиёева
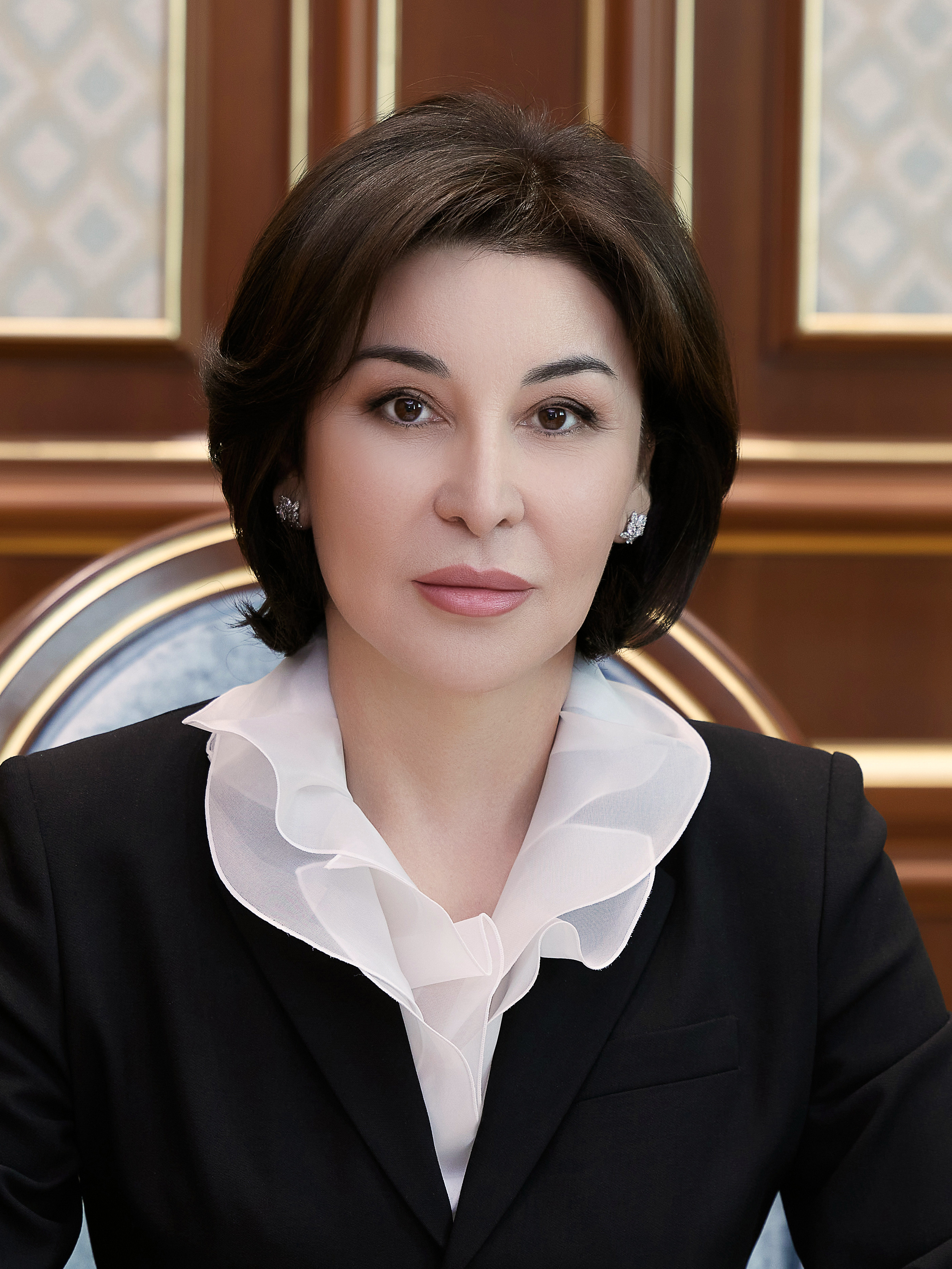
- Formal portrait, 2022

First Lady of Uzbekistan
- Current
- Assumed role 14 December 2016 (Note: Acting: 8 September – 14 December 2016)
- President: Shavkat Mirziyoyev
- Preceded by: Tatyana Karimova

Personal details
- Born: Ziroat Mahmudovna Hoshimova; 4 December 1964 (age 61) Fergana Region, Uzbek SSR, Soviet Union
- Spouse: Shavkat Mirziyoyev
- Children: 3, including Saida

Ziroat (Note: A large number of sources add the honorific suffix "-xon" to her first name, spelling it Ziroatxon. However, the official website of the President of Uzbekistan spells her first name simply as Ziroat. Ziroatxon is sometimes Romanized as Ziroatkhon through the Romanization of Russian.) Mahmudovna Mirziyoyeva (née Hoshimova; (Note: While many sources use her maiden surname, the official website of the President of Uzbekistan refers to her as Mirziyoyeva. Mainstream Uzbek publications also refer to her as Ziroat Mirziyoyeva. Her maiden last name is sometimes Romanzied as Khoshimova through Romanization of Russian.) born 4 December 1964) is an Uzbek politician who has served as the First Lady of Uzbekistan since 2016 as the wife of President Shavkat Mirziyoyev.

== Biography ==
=== Early years and education ===
Ziroat Mirziyoyeva was born Ziroat Hoshimova in the Uzbek city of Kokand into an influential and religious family. Her father was head of the Central Asian railway's supply department, which managed the 'Dorrestoran' catering and dining cars.

Mirziyoyeva enrolled at TIIAME, where she met Shavkat Mirziyoyev, an employee of the university and its Komsomol secretary. Her family initially opposed their relationship, but eventually approved the marriage. When she was still a student, Mirziyoyeva had a daughter, Saida. Mirziyoyeva graduated in 1986 with a degree in economics engineering. She speaks Uzbek, Russian and English.

=== Public and political activity ===
Her husband Shavkat Mirziyoyev became a deputy of the 12th convocation of the Supreme Soviet of the Uzbek SSR in 1990, then he was a khokim of one of the districts of Tashkent, a member of two convocations of the Oliy Majlis, the 3rd khokim of Jizzakh Region, the 4th khokim of Samarkand Region. After that, he was appointed Prime Minister of Uzbekistan in 2003 and retained this position until 2016.

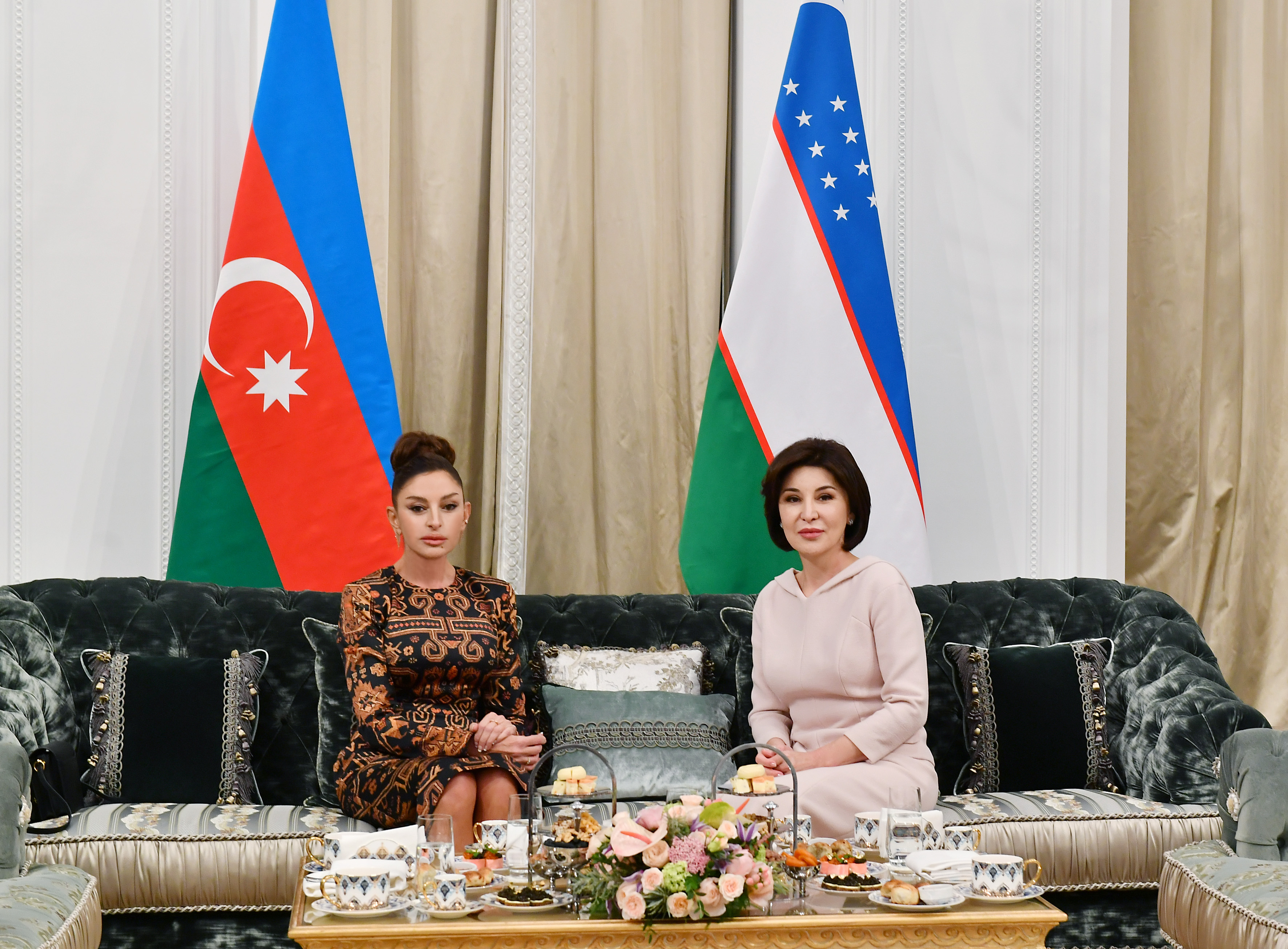
First Lady of Azerbaijan Mehriban Aliyeva meeting with Mirziyoyeva, 2022

During presidency of Islam Karimov, Mirziyoyeva, as well as all her family members, lived a private life and did not participate in official events for fear of possible persecution by the president. The first mention of Ziroat Mirziyoyeva appeared in Shavkat Mirziyoyev's official biography only in November 2016, when he became a presidential candidate after Karimov's death.

Later, as the wife of the president, she began to appear regularly in public and accompany Shavkat Mirziyoyev on international visits. According to Radio Ozodlik, Mirziyoyeva influences appointments in the Uzbek government, with her power is particularly strong in the Ministry of Health and the pharmaceutical sector.

Mirziyoyeva is the Chairperson of the Board of Trustees of the 'Zamin' International Public Foundation, established in 2020. The foundation leads chariy projects as well as health care, education and inclusive environment initiatives in Uzbekistan. The first project of the foundation was the provision of material assistance to 5 thousand women in the amount of 5 billion sums.

== Family ==
Ziroat Mirziyoyeva has three children and six grandchildren. Her daughter Saida Mirziyoyeva (born 1984) has been Assistant to the President since August 2023 and thus holds the second most important post in Uzbekistan; her second daughter Shakhnoza Mirziyoyeva is First Deputy Director of the National Social Security Agency. Her son Miralisher was born in 2009.

Mirziyoyeva's sons-in-law Oybek Tursunov and Otabek Umarov are major businessmen who became rich after being related to the Mirziyoyev family.

Mirziyoyeva has a sister Saiyora Hoshimova and a brother Muhammad Hoshimov, who became co-owner of a number of large industrial enterprises during the reign of Shavkat Mirziyoyev. Saiyora's daughter Diora (Diyora) was married to the nephew of billionaire Alisher Usmanov, Babur Usmanov. A few years after his death in a road accident in 2013, Diora married Batyr Rakhimov, one of the richest men in Uzbekistan.
