= Saida Mirziyoyeva =

Uzbek politician (born 1984)

- Саида Мирзиёева
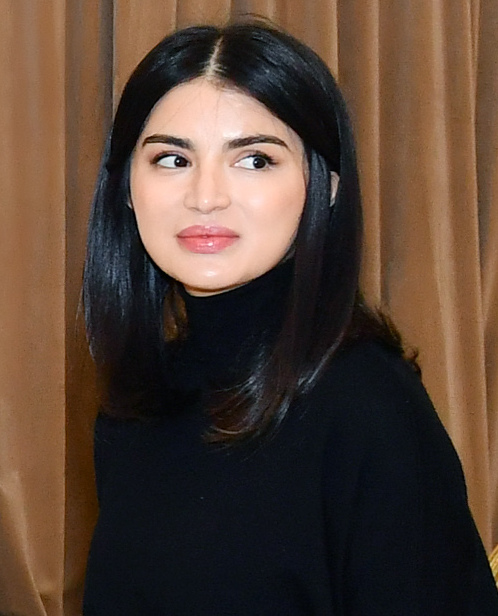
- Mirziyoyeva in 2022

Head of the Presidential Administration
- Incumbent
- Assumed office 24 June 2025
- President: Shavkat Mirziyoyev
- Deputy: Komil Allamjonov
- Preceded by: Sardor Umurzakov (2023)

Deputy Chair of the National Security Council
- Incumbent
- Assumed office 14 August 2026
- Chairman: Shavkat Mirziyoyev
- Preceded by: Office established

First Assistant to the President
- In office 25 August 2023 – 24 June 2025
- President: Shavkat Mirziyoyev

Personal details
- Born: 4 November 1984 (age 41) Kokand, Uzbek SSR, Soviet Union
- Spouse: Oybek Tursunov
- Children: 3
- Parent(s): Shavkat Mirziyoyev; Ziroat Mirziyoyeva
- Education: University of World Economy and Diplomacy

Saida Shavkatovna Mirziyoyeva (born 4 November 1984) is an Uzbek politician. and the eldest daughter of incumbent President Shavkat Mirziyoyev. Since June 2025, she has occupied the role of Head of the Presidential Administration of Uzbekistan. In August 2026, a sweeping constitutional reform expanded her executive powers, with the office outranking the prime minister in terms of legal authority and oversight over the Cabinet of Ministers. The law also designated the head of the administration as the deputy chair of the Security Council, effectively establishing her as the de facto number two political figure in the country.

In August 2023, when the position of Head of the Presidential Administration was dissolved, Mirziyoyeva was appointed First Assistant to the President and took over the highest position in the president's administration after the head of state. On 24 June 2025, the position of Head was re-established and Mirziyoyeva was appointed to it.

Previously, Mirziyoyeva served as the head of the Communications and Information Policy Sector of the Executive Office of the President from 2020 to 2023, as deputy chairperson of the supervisory board of the Public Foundation for Support and Development of National Mass Media of Uzbekistan from 2020 to November 2022, and as deputy director of the Information and Mass Communications Agency at the Presidential Administration from April 2019 to January 2020.

== Early life and education ==
Saida Mirziyoyeva was born on November 4, 1984, in Kokand, Fergana Region, into the family of Shavkat Mirziyoyev, an employee and Komsomol organizer of the Tashkent Institute of Irrigation and Melioration, and Ziroat Mirziyoyeva, a student of this institute and the daughter of an affluent Soviet official. Saida Mirziyoyeva has a younger sister, Shakhnoza Mirziyoyeva, and a brother, Miralisher Mirziyoyev (born in 2009).

Her father became a deputy of the XII convocation of the Supreme Soviet of the Uzbek SSR in 1990, then served as hokim (governor) of one of the districts of Tashkent, a member of two convocations of the Oliy Majlis (parliament), the 3rd hokim of the Jizzakh Region, and the 4th hokim of the Samarkand Region. In 2003, he was appointed Prime Minister of Uzbekistan and held this post until 2016, when he became the President of Uzbekistan following the death of the first President of Uzbekistan, Islam Karimov.

In 2006, she graduated from the University of World Economy and Diplomacy with a bachelor's degree in international law. In 2008, she obtained a master's degree in law from the Tashkent State University of Law, followed by a master's degree in economics from Moscow State University in 2010.

From 2018 to 2021, she was a student at the Academy of Public Administration under the President of Uzbekistan and the Center for Strategic Studies at Moscow State University.

== Career ==
Saida Mirziyoyeva's political and managerial career began under the leadership of former presidential press secretary Komil Allamjonov. On April 12, 2019, she was appointed one of the three deputy directors of the Agency for Information and Mass Communications under the President's Administration (AIMC). Working closely with Allamjonov, Mirziyoyeva coordinated the work of the PR center responsible for boosting Uzbekistan's positive image globally. She also took charge of revamping the information services of various state agencies. On January 29, 2020, Mirziyoyeva and Allamjonov announced their departure from AIMC, expressing their interest in exploring opportunities in the private sector.

On January 31, 2020, Saida Mirziyoyeva became the deputy to Komil Allamjonov, who had just been elected as the chairman of the supervisory board of the newly established Public Foundation for Support and Development of National Mass Media. The foundation's stated goal was to "promote the creation of equal conditions in the media market, protect the rights, and provide comprehensive support to media, journalists, and bloggers." However, the foundation also promoted a liberal image of Shavkat Mirziyoyev's government outside of Uzbekistan.

On November 14, 2022, Saida Mirziyoyeva was appointed the head of the Communications and Information Policy Sector within the executive office of the President's Administration. Komil Allamjonov, once again, became her immediate superior and the head of this new sector within the Presidential Administration structure. According to the president's spokesperson, Mirziyoyeva's team would focus on "studying public opinion and information policy." Observers noted that these changes came in response to significant protests in Karakalpakstan earlier that year, and Mirziyoyeva's main task would be to repair the image of her father's government.

After the constitutional referendum in the spring 2023, which reset presidential term limits, and Shavkat Mirziyoyev's victory in the July snap elections, he initiated radical personnel changes within his administration in August. The position of the head of the administration, previously held by Sardor Umurzakov for just over a year, was abolished, and in the new structure, all advisors and assistants were to report directly to the president. On August 25, 2023, Mirziyoyeva was appointed the president's assistant, effectively becoming the second most powerful figure in Uzbekistan. Allamjonov, meanwhile, was appointedthe head of the Department of Information Policy within the Presidential Administration, thus becoming the third-ranking official in the administration and a deputy to Mirziyoyeva for the first time. Experts and observers noted tensions between Saida Mirziyoyeva and Sardor Umurzakov, who had rapidly gained political influence, and considered Mirziyoyeva's new appointment a sign of the president's need to rely on family and loyalists due to his perceived vulnerability. While Mirziyoyeva's exact responsibilities in her new role remain unclear, it is expected that she will continue efforts to enhance Uzbekistan's positive international image.

In December 2024 she was tasked as First Deputy Director of the National Agency for Social Protection to create at least five documentataries or films featuring people with disabilities in Uzbekistan in 2024. The President gave her the task citing as an example Dilorom Yuldosheva who was a woman whose story had received international attention when she was included in the BBC's 100 inspiring women. The President had recognised her courage after the BBC award and he gave her a Mardlik award for her courage.

In June 2025, the position of the Head of the Presidential Administration of Uzbekistan was re-established and Mirziyoyeva was appointed there.

== Public image and criticism ==
Since assuming her role within the AIMC, she has actively engaged with social media, prompting significant coverage from Uzbek media outlets. Throughout her career, she has been a vocal advocate for liberal media laws, education advancement, gender equality reforms, and women's rights. She is also known for her active commentary on current events. Additionally, she portrays herself as a nurturing mother figure and a preserver of Islamic cultural traditions.

Criticism of Mirziyoyeva's rapid rise to prominence often centers on allegations of nepotism, a common feature of Shavkat Mirziyoyev's administration. Some independent observers liken her trajectory to that of Gulnara Karimova, the daughter of Uzbekistan's first president, while others suggest parallels with the establishment of new political dynasties in countries like Azerbaijan and Turkmenistan. However, there are also concerns that in Uzbekistan's conservative society, Mirziyoyeva might serve more as a "regent" for her younger brother, MiraLisher Mirziyoyev, should he assume power prematurely.

== Personal life ==
Mirziyoyeva is married to Oybek Tursunov, a prominent entrepreneur and a member of the president's administration. His father, General Batyr Tursunov, had a background in the Soviet KGB and held the position of Deputy Commander of the National Guard until 2020. As of 2023, he serves as the First Deputy Chief of the State Security Service of Uzbekistan.

The couple has three children: a son Miromon, a daughter Saodat, and a son Shavkat (born in 2020), who was named after his grandfather, the president.
