= Uktam Barnoev =

Uzbek politician (1964–2020)

Deputy Prime Minister of Uzbekistan
- In office 28 February 2020 – 20 September 2020
- Preceded by: position established
- Succeeded by: Shavkat Mirziyoyev

Khokim (Governor) of Bukhara region
- In office 16 December 2016 – 27 February 2020
- Preceded by: Muhiddin Esanov
- Succeeded by: Karim Kamalov

Khokim (Governor) of Samarkand region
- In office 15 April 2008 – 17 December 2010
- Preceded by: Azam Bakhramov
- Succeeded by: Zoir Mirzaev

Personal details
- Born: 11 July 1964 Romitan District, Bukhara region, Uzbek SSR
- Died: 20 September 2020 (age 56) Germany

Uktam Isayevich Barnoev (11 July 1964 — 20 September 2020) was an Uzbek politician. He served as Khokim (Governor) of Samarkand Region from 2008 to 2010 and of his native Bukhara Region from 2016 to 2020, and as Deputy Prime Minister of Uzbekistan from February 2020 until his death in office during the COVID-19 pandemic in Germany in September 2020.

== Biography ==
Barnoev was born in Romitan District, Bukhara Region (then part of the Uzbek SSR in Soviet Union), in 1964. From 1981 to 1986 he studied at the Tashkent Institute of Irrigation and Agricultural Mechanization Engineers, where he graduated in 1986.

During his career he held the following offices:

- 1986 – engineer of the technical directorate of the 6th Bukhara regional administration of integrated enterprises;
- 1997–2000 – Deputy Head of the Department of Agriculture and Water Resources of the Bukhara Region for Economics and Reforms;
- from 2000 to 2002, he held executive positions within the Ministry of Agriculture and Water Resources;
- 2002–2004 – leading specialist of the agro-industrial commission of the Cabinet of Ministers;
- 2004–2005 – Head of the Information and Analytical Department of the Cabinet of Ministers for Agriculture and Water Resources;
- 2005–2007 – head of the Information and Analytical Department of the Cabinet of Ministers for Agriculture and Water Resources, Processing of Agricultural Products and Consumer Goods;
- in 2007 he was appointed to the post of First Deputy Minister of Agriculture and Water Resources, a post which he held until April 15, 2008;
- from 15 April 2008 to 17 December 2010 he served as hokim of the Samarkand Region.
- from 2011 to 2016, Head of the Water Inspection Service of the Ministry of Agriculture and Water Resources;
- in 2016 – Head of Inspection and Chairman of the Board of JSC Uzagrokhimiya;
- from 16 December 2016 to February 2020, he served as khokim of Bukhara Region.

On 27 February 2020, Barnoev's candidacy was considered and approved by the deputies of the Legislative Chamber of Parliament for the post of Deputy Prime Minister of Uzbekistan for the development of the agrarian and food sectors. On February 28, 2020, the President of Uzbekistan appointed him as Deputy Prime Minister. Since July 6, 2020, he also held the position of Chairman of the Federation of Horse Breeding and Equestrian Sports of Uzbekistan.

On 30 July 2020, it was announced that Barnoev had tested positive for COVID-19 during the COVID-19 pandemic in Uzbekistan. He was hospitalized in Tashkent at the same time as his successor as khokim of Bukhara region, Karim Kamalov, who died in August. After his condition deteriorated, he was put on a ventilator and later transferred to a clinic in Germany, where he died on 20 September, aged 56.
