= Dilorom Yuldosheva =

Uzbek businesswoman and disability activist

Dilorom Yuldasheva
- Occupations: seamstress and businessperson
- Known for: creating a business after a life-changing accident

Dilorom Yuldasheva (Uzbek: Dilorom Yoʻldosheva) is an Uzbek businesswoman with a disability. She lost her legs in an accident with a combine harvester. Her business employs 40 others. Her achievements were recognized, and she was named one of the BBC's 100 Inspiring Women. She also received a national courage award in 2024.

== Life ==
Yuldasheva was married and she worked in the fields in the Denov district of Uzbekistan. She was hand-feeding a combine harvester when her long clothes became entangled in the machinery. As a result, both of her legs had to be amputated. She became immobile as her family could not afford a wheelchair. She told her husband that he should remarry, but he firmly refused, telling her never to bring up the matter again.

Within two years of the accident, she had established a sewing business that employed forty other women. She aimed to provide an alternative to fieldwork for women. She organised training and obtained contracts so that they could create uniforms for businesses and schools.

Yuldasheva received visits from people offering their sympathies, many of whom took selfies with her. One group brought a wheelchair and a makeup box, which they used in photos. A week later, she discovered that the wheelchair actually belonged to a local elderly woman. She returned the chair and the make-up box was retrieved. She became resigned to the exploitation, but she noted her own disappointment at losing the chair as she had been temporarily mobile. Even with a wheelchair, she could not travel far, as her family lived more than a mile from the nearest road, which she would have to traverse before reaching any form of transport. The dresses that she makes are delivered by her son on his bicycle.

In 2024 she was recognised as one of the BBC's 100 inspiring women for 2024. Following this, she was awarded the national 'Mardlik' (Courage) award in December 2024 at a meeting chaired by the President. The President's daughter and assistant Saida Mirziyoyeva was tasked with making a film about Yuldosheva, and at least four more, in 2025. The President also announced ambitious plans to improve support for people with disabilities. Yuldosheva thanked the President for his help and for continuing to deliver peace.
