= Svetlana Inamova =

Uzbek politician

- Светлана Турсунходжаевна Инамова (Uzbek)

Deputy Prime Minister of Uzbekistan
- In office 2005 – June 2008
- Prime Minister: Shavkat Mirziyoyev
- Succeeded by: Farida Akbarova

Personal details
- Born: February 11, 1951 (age 75) Andijan, Uzbek SSR, USSR
- Occupation: Politician

Svetlana Inamova (Uzbek: Светлана Турсунходжаевна Инамова, romanized: Svetlana Tursunxodjayevna Inamova; born 11 February 1951) is a politician in Uzbekistan. She was a deputy prime minister and head of the women's committee, and was a member of the Senate of the Oliy Majlis. On 1 March 2005, she addressed the plenary session of the 49th session of the United Nations Commission on the Status of Women. In June 2008 she was replaced as Deputy Prime Minister and head of the women's committee by Farida Akbarova.

In 2005 she was chair of the board of Special Olympics Uzbekistan, and in that role opened a conference "Commitment to Changing the Lives of Children and Young People with Different Abilities" where representatives of UN Agencies, NGOs and government bodies from the region discussed disability and sport.

As of 2022 she is chair of Soglom Avlod Uchun Foundation, an international nongovernmental charity fund which "[directs its] activities to realization of humanitarian, medical, educational programs, support of talented children and propagation of a healthy life style which cover vulnerable levels of population, children and youth". In 2018, as chair of Soglom Avlod Uchun Foundation, she spoke at the First Shanghai Cooperation Organisation Forum on Women.
