= Kamalak =

Children's organization in Uzbekistan

- Children′s organization „Kamalak"
- Formation: May 23, 2001
- Type: Children's organization
- Headquarters: 11, Navoi street, Tashkent district, Uzbekistan
- Location: Tashkent, Uzbekistan
- Region served: Uzbekistan
- Members: 3 600 000 (10-14)
- Official language: Uzbek
- Chairman: Madina Baratova
- Main organ: Youth Union of Uzbekistan
- Volunteers: 300 000

Kamalak (Uzbek: "Kamalak" bolalar tashkiloti, "Камалак" болалар ташкилоти; Russian: Детская организация "Камалак", Detskaya organizatsiya "Kamalak") is an organization under the Youth Union of Uzbekistan, which implemented and united social projects aimed at supporting the talents and talents of students from ten to eighteen years of age based on the principles of voluntariness, transparency, equality of rights and obligations.

The main goal of the organization's activities is to educate children as loyal children of the Motherland and perfect human beings based on the national idea, to express and protect their rights and interests, to create conditions for them to show and develop their talents and abilities.

== Rights ==
The organization carries out its activities on the basis of the Constitution and laws of the Republic of Uzbekistan, the Convention on the Rights of the Child, the Charter of the Youth Union of Uzbekistan and the organization's charter. The organization has its structures in the Republic of Karakalpakstan, all regions, Tashkent cities.

== Motto ==
The main motto of the organization was: "For the homeland, friendship and happy childhood."

== International cooperation ==
Active members of the children's organization "Kamalak" took part in the international cultural and educational forum "Children of the Commonwealth" in the Kyrgyz Republic on from June 26 to July 5.

== Projects ==
Every year under the motto of the organization "For the Motherland, Friendship and Happy Childhood" the leaders increase their social activity through mutual friendship, exchange of experience, support, skills of working with young people, further development of their creative and intellectual abilities, leadership and initiative. A traditional conference is held in order to publicize the abilities and achievements and best practices, strengthen leadership skills and increase their activity, support their activities, popularize best practices, and encourage the most active captains. Within the framework of the conference, the Republican stages of such contests as "Leader of the Year", "Council of the Most Exemplary Regional Leaders" and "Kamalak Connoisseurs" will be held.

== Privileges ==
Decision No. 914 of the Cabinet of Ministers of the Republic of Uzbekistan "On granting privileges to active members of the Youth Union of Uzbekistan in entering higher education institutions". Active leaders of the "Kamalak" children's organization can also use this privilege.

== See also ==
- Dilnozaxon Kattaxonova
