= Deputy Prime Minister of Uzbekistan =

The Deputy Prime Minister of the Republic of Uzbekistan (Uzbek: Oʻzbekiston Respublikasi Bosh vazirining oʻrinbosari) is a government post of the Government of Uzbekistan. In the absence of the Prime Minister of Uzbekistan, the first deputy performs his or her duties as the acting prime minister. In 1991, the post was grandfathered from the already existing first deputy chairman that was part of Council of Ministers of the Uzbek Soviet Socialist Republic.

In an absence of the first deputy, his or her functions are performed by four other deputy prime ministers who are members of the government. On June 12, 2017, the President of Uzbekistan issued a decree reducing the number of deputy prime ministers by one.

== List of Deputy Prime Ministers ==
Image	Officeholder	Term start	Term ended	President
	Abdulla Aripov	30 May 2002	August 2012	Islam Karimov
	Abdulla Aripov	12 September 2016	14 December 2016	Islam Karimov
	Elyor Ganiyev	February 4, 2005	July 12, 2006	Islam Karimov
	Svetlana Inamova	2005	June 2008	Islam Karimov
	Farida Akbarova	June 2008	8 June 2011	Islam Karimov
	Elmira Bosithonova	9 June 2011	December 12, 2016	Islam Karimov Shavkat Mirziyoyev
	Elmira Bosithonova	June 2019	January 2020	Islam Karimov Shavkat Mirziyoyev
	Ergash Shoismatov	August 2012	12 September 2016	Islam Karimov
	Rustam Azimov	4 February 2005	6 June 2017	Islam Karimov Shavkat Mirziyoyev
	Kahramon Akmalov	November 30, 2017	May 28, 2018	Shavkat Mirziyoyev
	Uktam Barnoev	28 February 2020	20 September 2020	Shavkat Mirziyoyev
	Behzod Musaev	May 14, 2020	November 11, 2021	Shavkat Mirziyoyev
	Aziz Abduhakimov	May 28, 2018	December 30, 2022	Shavkat Mirziyoyev
	Zulayho Mahkamova	March 1, 2022	10 July 2026	Shavkat Mirziyoyev

== Current Deputy Prime Ministers ==
Image	Officeholder	Assumed office	President
	Jamshid Kuchkarov	20 January 2020	Shavkat Mirziyoyev
	Jamshid Khodjayev	16 July 2022	Shavkat Mirziyoyev
	Dilnozaxon Kattaxonova	10 July 2026	Shavkat Mirziyoyev

== List of First Deputy Prime Ministers ==
Image	Officeholder	Term start	Term ended	President
	Bakhtiyor Hamidov	1990		Islam Karimov
	Rustam Azimov	November 22, 2008	December 15, 2016	Islam Karimov
	Ochilboy Ramatov	December 20, 2016	Present	Shavkat Mirziyoyev

== See also ==
- Deputy Prime Minister of Tajikistan
- Deputy Prime Minister of Kazakhstan
- Deputy Chairman of the Cabinet of Ministers of Turkmenistan
