= Oybek Tursunov =

Uzbek government official and entrepreneur

Deputy Head of the Presidential Administration of Uzbekistan
- Incumbent
- Assumed office 2017
- President: Shavkat Mirziyoyev

Personal details
- Born: Uzbek Soviet Socialist Republic, Soviet Union
- Spouse: Saida Mirziyoyeva
- Children: 3
- Occupation: entrepreneur, government official

Oybek Tursunov (Uzbek: Oybek Botirovich Tursunov) is an Uzbek entrepreneur and government official. Tursunov is married to Saida Mirziyoyeva, the eldest daughter of the current President of Uzbekistan, Shavkat Mirziyoyev. After Mirziyoyev was appointed president in 2017, Tursunov assumed the position of Deputy Head of the Presidential Administration. He is also known to have managed Uzbekistan's national payment system, Uzcard, and was the controlling shareholder of Kapitalbank, one of the largest private banks in the country.

== Biography ==
Oybek Tursunov was born into the family of Batyr Tursunov, who served in the KGB during Soviet times. After Uzbekistan's independence, Batyr Tursunov became one of the most influential figures in the country's security apparatus. In the late 1990s, he even led the Main Directorate for Combating Terrorism and Extremism at the Ministry of Internal Affairs of Uzbekistan.

During the presidency of Islam Karimov, the Tursunov family had already played a significant role in the country's political arena. The family solidified its position through the son's marriage to Saida Mirziyoyeva, the eldest daughter of then Prime Minister of Uzbekistan, Shavkat Mirziyoyev. According to the Radio Ozodlik, Oybek Tursunov lived for some time in Moscow, where he represented the national railway company Uzbek Railways. His relocation to Russia might have been caused by a conflict with a criminal group in Tashkent. In 2005, following the Andijan massacre, Batyr Tursunov lost his influence in the Ministry of Internal Affairs, but was later anyway appointed as the head of the Interpol National Central Bureau.

Like the rest of Shavkat Mirziyoyev's family, Oybek Tursunov first appeared in public on the day of the presidential election in Uzbekistan on 4 December 2016.

== Government Service ==
Soon after the presidential inauguration, Shavkat Mirziyoyev appointed close family members to key positions in the government. Saida Mirziyoyeva became the deputy director of the Agency of Information and Mass Communications under the Presidential Administration. Oybek Tursunov's father, Batyr Tursunov, first became the head of the Uzbekistan National Guard and later, in 2020, assumed the leadership of the State Security Service. Oybek's brother, Ulukbek Tursunov, took up the position of deputy chief of the Tashkent City Police Department (Russian: ГУВД Ташкента).

Oybek Tursunov was appointed the Deputy Head of the Presidential Administration. Sources close to the state apparatus stated that as early as 2017, Tursunov had already been functioning as the principal head of the Presidential Administration. In that year, he was responsible for the construction of a new presidential residence in the settlement of Baytkurgan near Tashkent. For this purpose, dozens of homes along the banks of the Chirchiq river were demolished, while some of the streets were artificially widened. Radio Ozodlik sources reported that the residence was decorated with Argentinian blue marble and Swarovski crystals. Shavkat Mirziyoyev moved into the new residence on the day of his 60th birthday. Based on the leakages from state procurement data, it was established that in 2018, Tursunov held the position of General Director of the Directorate of State Residences of the Presidential Administration Affairs Department (Russian: Дирекция государственных резиденций Управления делами ФХД (Финансово-хозяйственного департамента) администрации президента.)

== Business ==
Despite Tursunov'Kapitalbank’ss low public profile, Radio Ozodlik regards him as one of the most influential businessmen in Uzbekistan. By 2023, following Shavkat Mirziyoyev's ascent to power, Tursunov had founded at least nine companies and had acquired control over valuable real estate in Tashkent and other regions of Uzbekistan. There is evidence that following numerous inspections, Uzbekistan's largest wholesale market, Abu Sahiy, which was previously under the ownership of Timur Tillyaev, son-in-law of Islam Karimov, was acquired by Tursunov and another son-in-law of the current president, Otabek Umarov.

In May 2020, Oybek Tursunov acquired a 75% shareholding in the 'Edinyi obshcherespublikanskii protsessingovyi tsentr', which operates the interbank payment system known as Uzcard, with the remaining 25% of the shares being retained by the company itself. Uzcard is the national payment system of Uzbekistan. As of 2019, it serviced about 17 million Uzcard bank cards and provided acquiring services for 29 banks in Uzbekistan and 40 payment aggregators. The deal coincided with the government's decision to transfer pension contributions from the Humo payment system of the Narodny Bank of Uzbekistan to Uzcard cards. However, just a few months later, Tursunov transferred his share to five national banks of Uzbekistan, which soon handed over their Uzcard shares to the State Assets Management Agency (UzSAMA). In October 2022, UzSAMA sold the entire package for 210.1 billion UZS to four individuals. Three of them contributed shares to a new legal entity, IMC-Capital. The sole founder of IMC-Capital is the unknown company "Berill Holding Company Limited," registered in the United Arab Emirates with a charter capital of $1000.

In 2019, the company Promadik Invest, in which Tursunov's share constituted 93.4%, purchased 35% of the shares of Kapitalbank. In November 2021, Tursunov increased his stake in the bank's charter capital to 50%. In January 2022, Tursunov sold part of his shares to Telekominvest, a subsidiary of the conglomerate owned by Alisher Usmanov. After that, Tursunov was removed from the Kapitalbank's list of affiliated persons. Following the Russian invasion of Ukraine, Usmanov was placed on the sanction lists of Western countries. In March 2022, he sold his shares in Telekominvest and Finance TCI to long-time associates and former top managers of his holding, Irina Lupicheva and Boris Dobrodeev. Allegedly, at the end of 2022, Tursunov sold bank shares on the stock exchange through the Finance TCI. According to the Central Bank of Uzbekistan, as of February 1, 2023, Kapitalbank was the largest private bank in the country by asset size and the seventh largest among all Uzbekistan banks in terms of assets.

Media also reported that Tursunov owns the restaurants Kuranty, Obi Hayot, Truffle, and Nobel, as well as the Shodlik Palace hotel in Tashkent.

== Scandals ==
In November 2020, Jakhongir Artikkhodjayev, the Mayor of Tashkent, granted a 6-hectare plot of land to the company Urban Developers at no cost. The land was estimated to be worth at least $11.5 million at that time. The company was registered just a month before the deal, while LLP ODORATUS BUSINESS owned 97% of its shares. This entity, through several intermediary companies, belonged to Promadik Invest, whose main shareholder was Oybek Tursunov. The intended development for the land involved tearing down the current retail spaces to build a "multifunctional shopping and entertainment center." As a result, about 100 entrepreneurs filed complaints with the Antimonopoly Committee and the President of Uzbekistan. Urban Developers denied having any connection with Tursunov. In January 2021, the Chilanzar District Court of Tashkent for administrative cases declared the transaction illegal.

In 2021, Radio Ozodlik uncovered from the 2018 state procurement records that Oybek Tursunov had acquired a Montblanc desktop accessory set valued at over $6,000 with budget funds.

In August 2022, Amanbai Sagidullaev, the leader of the separatist movement Alga Karakalpakstan, alleged that President Mirziyoyev was transferring ownership of factories and industrial plants to his associates. In particular, Oybek Tursunov owns the Kungrad Soda Plant in Elobod through intermediary companies in Arab countries.

== Personal life ==
Oybek Tursunov and Saida Mirziyoyeva are parents to three children.

Oybek Tursunov is known for having a close relationship with the Crown Prince of Dubai, Hamdan bin Mohammed Al Maktoum. In 2019, the prince visited Uzbekistan to participate in a falconry hunt for MacQueen's bustard. The birds, however, are included in the Red Book of Uzbekistan. After the hunt, Tursunov, together with another president's son-in-law, Otabek Umarov, organized a celebratory dinner for the prince. In June 2019, Oybek Tursunov also attended the wedding of the sons of the Emir of Dubai, Mohammed bin Rashid Al Maktoum.

Tursunov is also known for his close relationship with the Head of the Chechen Republic, Ramzan Kadyrov.
