= Komil Allamjonov =

Uzbek Entrepreneur, Free-Speech Advocate and Public Figure

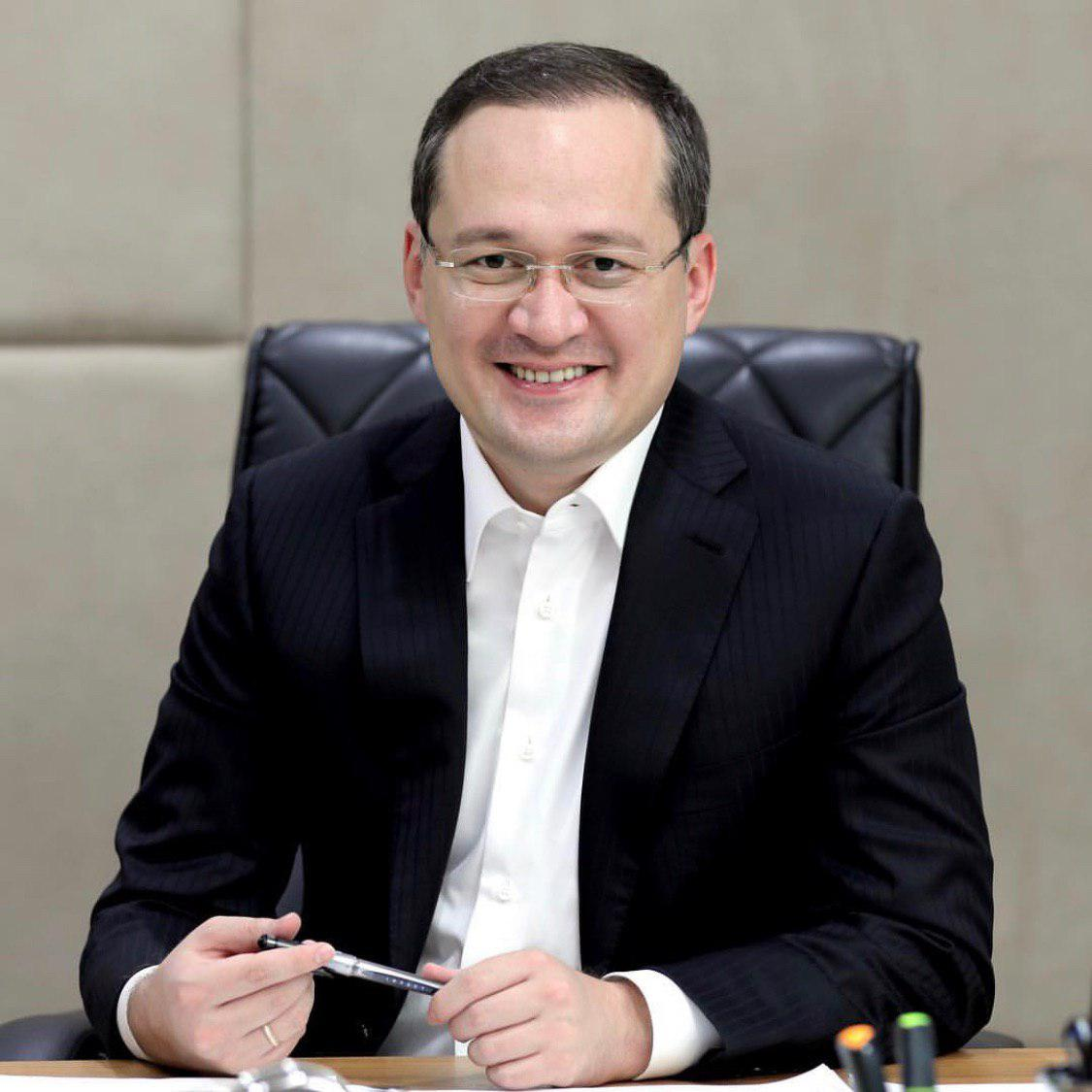

Entrepreneur, Free-speech advocate and media-reformist
- Incumbent
- Assumed office September 30, 2024

Deputy Head of Administration of the President of Uzbekistan / Head of Department of Information Policy at Administration of the President of Uzbekistan
- In office July 26, 2022 – September 30, 2024

Chairman of the Board of Trustees of the Public Foundation for Support and Development of the National Mass Media in Uzbekistan
- In office January 31, 2020 – July 26, 2022

Director of the Agency for Information and Mass Communications
- In office February 4, 2019 – January 31, 2020

Personal details
- Born: Komil Ismoilovich Allamjonov; September 18, 1984 (age 42) Tashkent, Uzbek SSR, USSR
- Education: Tashkent State Institute of Arts — Bachelor of Television and Radio Directing (2006); Tashkent State Economic University — Bachelor of Economics (2010)
- Website: https://allamjonov.com/en

Komil Ismoilovich Allamjonov (born September 18, 1984) is an Uzbek entrepreneur, public official and media reformist. His entrepreneurial undertakings include the TV channel Milliy TV, the driving school Avtotest Report and Driving Examination Centers across Uzbekistan. Allamjonov served as press secretary to President Shavkat Mirziyoyev from 2017 to 2018 and as Director of the Agency for Information and Mass Communications (AIMC) from 2018 to 2020. Allamjonov has been credited with advancing media liberalization in Uzbekistan during his public tenure.

In November 2025, Allamjonov was appointed Special Envoy and Representative of the Presidential Administration (PA) in the United States.

== Early life and education ==
Komil Allamjonov was born on September 18, 1984, in Tashkent, Uzbekistan, to a mechanic father and nurse mother. In his 2021 book Allamjonov's Fault, he recounts early entrepreneurial efforts, including selling cotton candy at age 13. He graduated with a bachelor's degree in Television and Radio Directing from the Tashkent State Institute of Arts and Culture in 2006 and earned a second bachelor's degree in economics from the Tashkent State Economic University in 2010.

== Early career ==
Allamjonov's career began in 2001 as an intern cameraman at Uzbek State Television, producing news segments for Davr. He then worked at the Ministry of Emergency Situations’ press service. From 2005 to 2013, he worked for the State Tax Committee (STC), eventually serving as Press Secretary from 2009 to 2013. In 2013, he founded and edited Soliq Info, a bilingual tax policy newspaper aimed at professionals.

== Entrepreneurship ==
Allamjonov established Avtotest Report in 2015. A private driving school introducing automated lessons to improve road safety and reduce corruption in state driving schools.

In 2016, he founded Milliy TV, a national television channel launched in the wake of President Islam Karimov's death, focusing on entertainment and Uzbek culture. It reintroduced previously banned artists like Obid Asomov and Yulduz Usmonova. In 2017, it broadcast President Mirziyoyev's South Korea visit live, a first for an Uzbek presidential trip. That year, Milliy TV hosted the O‘zbegim festival, where a 7,360-kilogram pilaf earned a Guinness World Record. Milliy TV broadcasts nationwide with 70% of its airtime in the Uzbek language.

In 2022, he founded Driving Examination Center, Tashkent's authorized center for driving license exams. Applicants are required to undergo a two-step examination process, comprising a theory test and an independent driving practice. Allamjonov has advocated for addressing fatalities resulting from car accidents through the provision of comprehensive education and stringent examination protocols.

== Views ==
Allamjonov has advocated for media freedom, opposing website bans and promoting government-media dialogue based on the rule of law. As AIMC Director, he lifted restrictions on YouTube and Twitter. At present, he remains a key figure in the advancement of free speech in Central Asia.

== Government positions ==
On December 1, 2017, Allamjonov was appointed Press Secretary to President Shavkat Mirziyoyev. He facilitated accreditation for foreign news outlets like the BBC and Voice of America, enhancing media access. In November 2018, he became Director of the AIMC, collaborating with Saida Mirziyoyeva, the president's daughter, to liberalize Uzbekistan's media sector. Achievements included unblocking foreign websites, simplifying media registration, and establishing press services in state entities. Uzbekistan's ranking in the Reporters Without Borders Press Freedom Index rose 13 points to 156th by 2020 during his tenure.

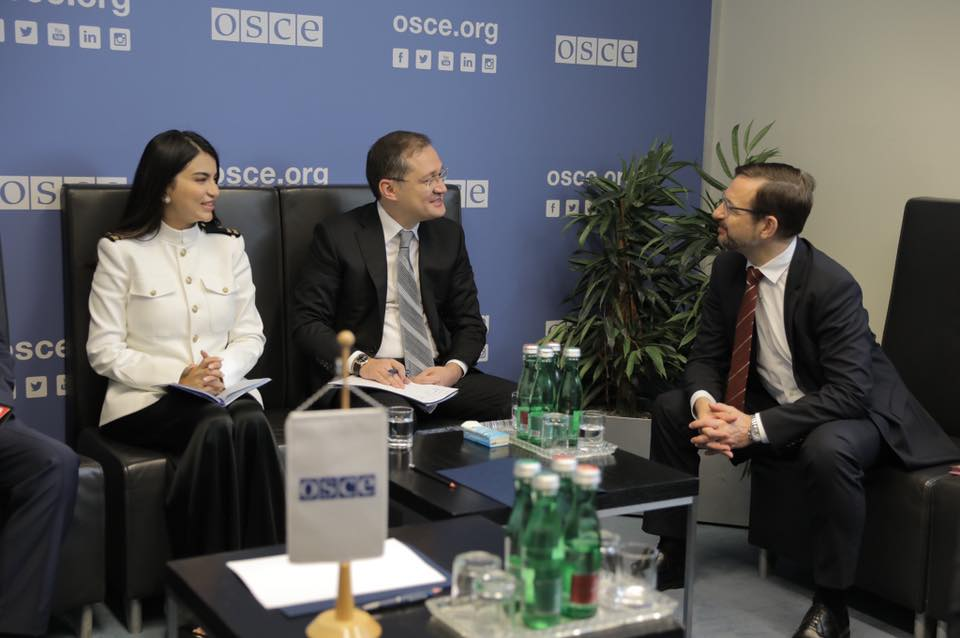

In January 2020, Allamjonov chaired the Public Foundation for Support and Development of National Mass Media, focusing on journalist training and international partnerships. He returned to government in July 2022 as Deputy Head of the Presidential Administration, later heading the Department of Information Policy from August 2023 until September 2024.

== Assassination attempt ==
On October 26, 2024, Allamjonov survived an assassination attempt in Tashkent's Kibray District. No direct motive has been publicly shared but resistance to reforms by antiquated power structures may have inspired the attempt. No physical injuries were reported.

Allamjonov was returning home when two unidentified men opened fire on his car. Later that day, the General Prosecutor's Office of Uzbekistan and local media confirmed the attempt on Allamjonov's life. A month prior to the incident, Allamjonov had resigned from his position as the Head of the Information Policy Department of the Presidential Administration at his own request to pursue his career in the private sector.

Allamjonov's case is connected to a series of personnel changes within Uzbekistan's security and law enforcement agencies. Uzbek authorities detained suspects, including Javlon Yunusov, who was extradited from South Korea. On November 24, the head of the State Security Service of Uzbekistan, Abdusalam Azizov, was dismissed from his position and transferred to the Secretariat of the Security Council under the President of Uzbekistan. The same day, several officials from law enforcement agencies in Uzbekistan were taken into custody. Allamjonov's murder attempt revealed a plot for political extermination through Chechen assassins. Media reported the involvement of two Russian citizens of Chechen origin: Bislan Rasayev and Shamil Temirkhanov, as suspects in the case. The incident received a commentary from the head of the Chechen Republic, Ramzan Kadyrov, who threatened Allamjonov in a social media post.

On February 12, 2025, military court of Uzbekistan sentenced all involved in Allamjonov's assassination attempt up to 23 years of imprisonment. Among them are Shukhrat Rasulov, former head of Department of Internal Security of the State Security Service of the President (2018–2020) who received 23 years in prison; Javlon Yunusov (23 years in prison); Doniyor Toshkhodjaev, former deputy head of Main Department of Internal Affairs of Tashkent City (seven years).

== Awards ==
In 2010, Allamjonov received the "Oltin Qalam" award for press service contributions. His book Allamjonov's Fault (2021) details his career and media reform perspectives.

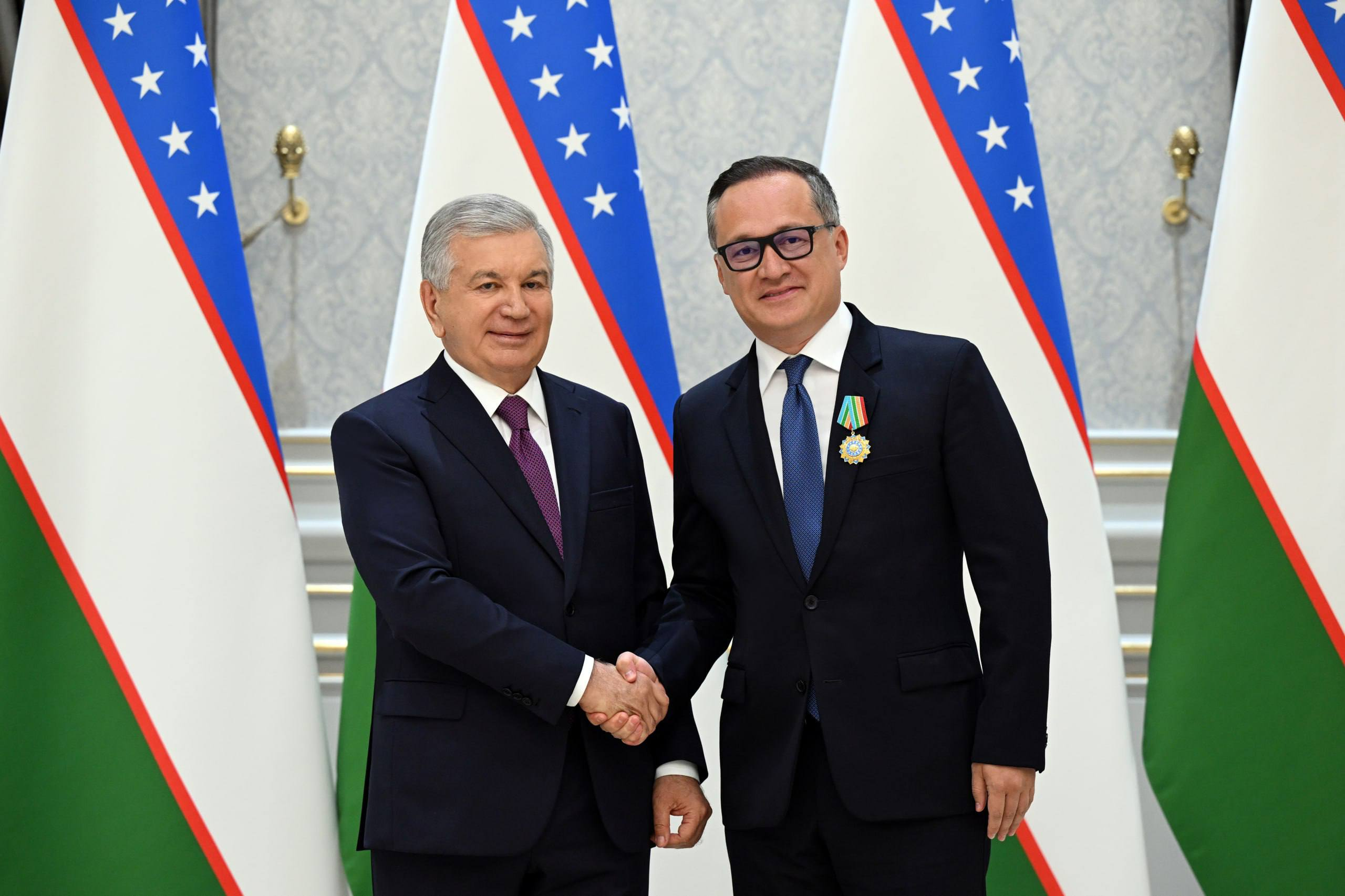
Komil Allamjonov receiving Dustlik Order from the hands of President Shavkat Mirziyoyev in 2026

In 2026, Komil Allamjonov was awarded "Dustlik" Order by the President of Uzbekistan Shavkat Mirziyoyev. In Uzbekistan, the award is presented for the services in strengthening relations with other nations.

== Later career ==
Allamjonov is serving as Special Envoy and Representative of the Presidential Administration (PA) in the United States. He retains his position as an independent advisor to the Head of the Administration of the President of Uzbekistan, Saida Mirziyoyeva. The Special Envoy is tasked with strengthening trade and investment relations between Uzbekistan and the United States. Since its launch, the Council, co-chaired by Saida Mirziyoyeva, has held several meetings, including with U.S. Secretary of State Marco Rubio and Special Envoy to South and Central Asia Ambassador Sergio Gor.

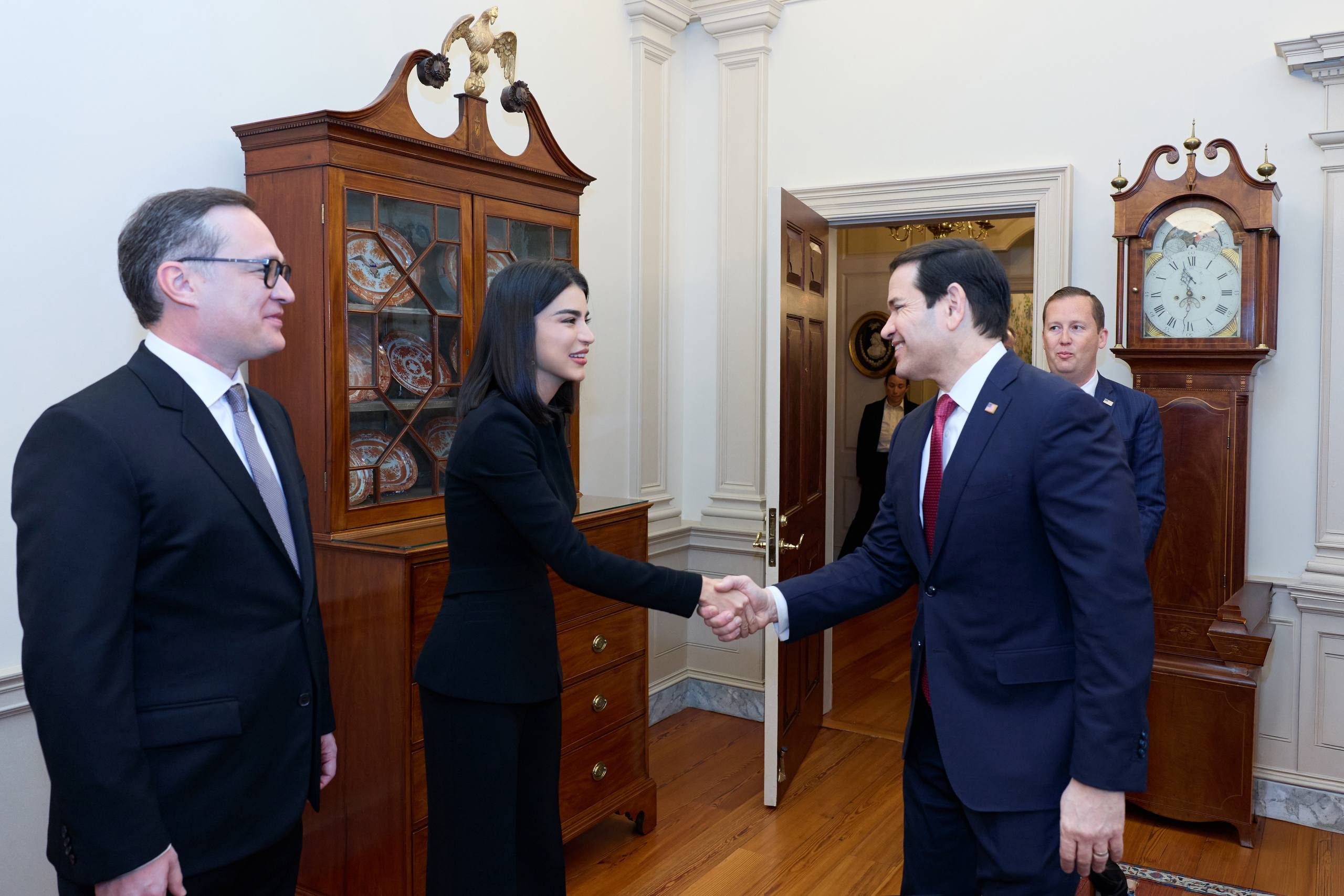
Saida Mirziyoyeva, Komil Allamjonov, Marco Rubio and Sergio Gor in a meeting in Washington D.C.

Allamjonov's appointment coincided with an acceleration of Uzbek-American business deals and frequent meetings with President Donald Trump. In January 2026, Shavkat Mirziyoyev flew to Washington to become a member of the Board of Peace and returned to the U.S. for the inaugural summit in February 2026. While in the U.S. in February and June of the same year, Mirziyoyev announced trade deals with several American companies, including Air Products, Boeing, BlackRock, and JPMorgan.

In November 2025, the Central Asian Program (CAP) at the Institute for European, Russian, and Eurasian Studies of the George Washington University announced Allamjonov as its Special Adviser.

== Personal life ==
Allamjonov is married and has five children.
