= List of Hokims of the Tashkent Region =

The Coat of Arms of Tashkent.

A Hokim (Uzbek: Hokim; Ҳоким) is head of the local executive authority in the Republic of Uzbekistan. According to paragraph 15 of Article 93 of the Constitution of Uzbekistan, a regional and city Hokim are both appointed and dismissed by the President of the Republic of Uzbekistan on the proposal of the Prime Minister.

== Hokims of Regions ==
=== Tashkent Region ===
- Kozim Tulyaganov (1997 - 2002)
- Rustam Shoabdurakhmanov (September 26, 2001 – April 22, 2005)
- Abdukahhar Tukhtaev (April 22, 2005- February 18, 2011)
- Rahmonbek Usmanov (February 18, 2011 - March 16, 2012)

== Hokims of Cities ==
=== Tashkent City ===
- Ummat Mirzakulov (January 12, 2000 – January 29, 2004)
- Kozim Tulyaganov (January 29, 2004 - November 7, 2005)
- Mirzamashrap Cucchi (November 7, 2005 - ?)
- Sodiq Abdullayev (?)
- Ahmad Usmanov ( - February 4, 2016)
- Sodiq Abdullayev (February 4, 2016 - August 12, 2016)
- Islamdzhan Ergashhodzhaev (Acting) (August 12, 2016 - December 15, 2016)
- Shukurullo Babayev (December 15, 2016 – present)

== See also ==
- President of Uzbekistan
- List of chairmen of the Parliament of the Republic of Karakalpakstan
- Politics of Uzbekistan
