= Presidential Administration of Uzbekistan =

Head of Government in Uzbekistan

- O‘zbekiston Prezidenti Administratsiyasi (Uzbek)
- Flag of the president of Uzbekistan

Agency overview
- Formed: 26 August 2018; 8 years ago
- Headquarters: Tashkent, Uzbekistan
- Employees: 423 (managerial personnel)
- Agency executives: Saida Mirziyoyeva, Head; Sardor Umurzakov, Advisor
- Website: president.uz

The Administration of the President of the Republic of Uzbekistan (Uzbek: O‘zbekiston Respublikasi Prezidenti Administratsiyasi) is a state body that officially provides support for the activities of the President of Uzbekistan.

== Powers and duties ==
In the official website of the President of Uzbekistan, it states that the Administration assists the implementation of the powers of the President, analyzes the local and global situation, assists in ensuring law and order in the country, makes proposals regarding local and foreign affairs, creates communication between the Presidency and the people, watches over and assists the implementation of Presidential Decrees, resolutions, and decisions.

== History ==
When held by Sardor Umurzakov, the position of Chief of Staff, which was the highest-ranking in the Administration after the President himself, acted as the president's "de facto enforcer".

In September 2023, the post of the Chief of Staff was dissolved, and the highest-ranking title in the Administration was now First Assistant to the President, to which President Shavkat Mirziyoyev's daughter Saida Mirziyoyeva was appointed.

In June 2025, position of Head was re-established and First Advisor to the President Saida Mirziyoyeva was appointed to the position. Sardor Umurzakov was made her Independent Advisor.

== Structure ==
As of 2023, the number of Advisors to the President was 11, and they were as follows:

- Advisor-Speechwriter to the President
- Advisor to the President on Coordination of Law Enforcement and Regulatory Agencies
- Advisor to the President on Sustainable Development of the Aral Sea Region
- Advisor to the President on issues of socio-political development
- Advisor – Director of the National Agency for Social Protection
- Advisor to the President on Economic Development
- Advisor to the President on Personnel Policy
- Advisor to the President on Religion and Interethnic relations
- Advisor to the President on Special Assignments, held by Sardor Umurzakov
- Advisor to the President on Energy Security
- Advisor to the President on Agricultural Development

The Administration is now headed by two people since June 2025:

- Head of the Administration, now Saida Mirziyoyeva
- Independent Advisor to the Head

== Head of the Administration ==
Name	Start	End	President
Zelimkhan Haydarov	1993	August 27, 2018,	Islam Karimov Shavkat Mirziyoyev
Zayniddin Nizomiddinov	August 27, 2018	July 7, 2022	Shavkat Mirziyoyev
Sardor Umurzakov	July 16, 2022	August 17, 2023	Shavkat Mirziyoyev
Position Abolished (August 17, 2023 - July 24, 2025)			Shavkat Mirziyoyev
Saida Mirziyoyeva	June 24, 2025	Present	Shavkat Mirziyoyev
