= Rustam Azimov =

Uzbek politician

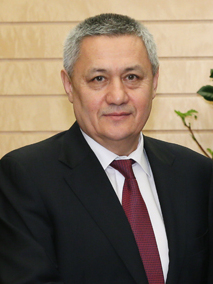

Deputy Prime Minister of Uzbekistan
- In office 4 February 2005 – 6 June 2017 Serving with Abdulla Aripov, Achilbay Ramatov, Zoyir Mirzaev and Gulomjon Ibragimov
- Prime Minister: Shavkat Mirziyoyev; Abdulla Aripov
- Preceded by: Bright Fayzullayev
- Succeeded by: Jamshed Kuchkarev

Minister of Finance
- In office 22 November 2005 – 15 December 2016
- Prime Minister: Shavkat Mirziyoyev
- Preceded by: Saidahmad Rahimov
- Succeeded by: Botir Xoʻjayev
- In office 1998 – 8 November 2000
- Prime Minister: Oʻtkir Sultonov
- Preceded by: Baxtiyor Hamidov
- Succeeded by: Mamarizo Nurmurodov

Personal details
- Born: Rustam Sadykovich Asimov; September 20, 1958 (age 67) Tashkent, Soviet Union (now Uzbekistan)
- Children: Islom Azimov

Rustam Sadykovich Asimov. born September 20, 1958) is an Uzbek politician who was Deputy Prime Minister of Uzbekistan from 2005 to 2017. He served as Minister of Finance from 1998 to 2000 and from 2005 to 2016.

== Biography ==
Born in Tashkent in 1958, Azimov was educated in engineering and holds a doctorate in economics. He was the chief economist for a collective farm near Jizzakh during the 1970s. After independence in 1991, Azimov served as head of Uzbekistan’s National Bank for Foreign Activities and dealt with the European Bank for Reconstruction and Development (EBRD).

He entered politics in 1994 when he was elected to the Uzbek parliament Oliy Majlis. He was Minister of Finance from 1998 to 2000 before being named Minister of Macroeconomics and Statistics. In 2002, he was appointed as Deputy Prime Minister for the Economy, a powerful position, and was again named Minister of Finance in 2005. He was considered to be one of the leading contenders to succeed Islam Karimov as President of Uzbekistan. Azimov was often seen at Karimov's side during international meetings and was seen as better in relating to politicians outside Uzbekistan compared to other presidential aspirants.
