= Otabek Umarov =

Uzbek civil servant and sports functionary

- Born: Otabek Muhammadalievich Umarov; May 15, 1984 (age 42); Kokand, Fergana, Uzbek SSR, USSR
- Education: Tashkent Institute of Textile and Lyogkoy Promyshlennosti-2005; Tashkent State University of Economics-2009; Tashkent University of Design, Construction & Maintenance of Automotive Roads-2014-2015
- Occupation: Sports functionary

Otabek Umarov (Uzbek: Otabek Umarov, Отабек Умаров; born May 15, 1984) is an Uzbek civil servant and sports official. He is the son-in-law of Uzbek President Shavkat Mirziyoyev. He has been characterized as influential in the Uzbek government.

== Biography ==
Otabek Umarov's father, Muhammadali Akhmadalievich Umarov (1957–2008), worked as the deputy head of the construction department of the Tashkent Railway Department. His mother, Guzal Ulmasovna Umarova (born in 1965), raised him.

Having graduated with honors from the Kokand Physics and Mathematics Lyceum No. 32 in 2001, he entered the Faculty of Management at the Tashkent Institute of Textile and Light Industry. In 2009, he defended his master's thesis in the same field at the Tashkent State University of Economics. From 2013 to 2015, he studied in the master's program for the design, construction, and operation of highways at the Tashkent Institute.

After graduating from the Tashkent Institute of Textile and Light Industry in 2005, Otabek Umarov worked in the foreign branches of Uzavtosanoat, rising from manager to deputy general director of UzAvto Odessa.

Since January 2017, he has been an employee of the State Security Service of the President of the Republic of Uzbekistan. In January 2018, he became the deputy head of the service under President Shavkat Mirziyoyev.

=== Triathlon ===
On March 7, 2019, delegates of the Uzbekistan Triathlon Federation elected him as chairman.

=== Mixed martial arts ===
On November 10, 2019, Otabek Umarov was elected president of the Association of Mixed Martial Arts of Uzbekistan.

On August 14, 2020, he announced his resignation from the leadership of the Triathlon Federation and the Association of Mixed Martial Arts of Uzbekistan. This decision was prompted by changes related to the COVID-19 pandemic.

=== Olympic Council of Asia ===
On December 15, 2020, at a meeting of the executive committee of the Olympic Council of Asia (OCA) in Oman, he was elected deputy president of the organization. For the first time, Uzbekistan received the right to nominate its representative for the post, due to the upcoming Asian Youth Games being held in the republic.

=== Brand 7SABER ===
In 2019, Umarov created a graphic element based on internationally recognized sports icons. The design, resembling the number seven, was intended to reference concepts associated with numerology. The London Institute of Identity INSTID and the Tashkent agency GRANDPR later developed the 7SABER brand platform, which was introduced to the public on June 25, 2021.

== Personal life ==
Umarov married Shakhnoza Mirziyoyeva in 2007. She is the youngest daughter of Shavkat Mirziyoyev, who was prime minister under Islam Karimov's authoritarian regime

In 2023, Umarov acquired Emirati citizenship. He acquired the citizenship while serving as deputy presidential security chief, which violated Uzbek law.

After leaving his government position in 2024, Umarov acquired 13 luxury apartments in Dubai, valued at $7 million.
