= Abdulla Aripov =

Prime Minister of Uzbekistan since 2016

- Абдулла Арипов
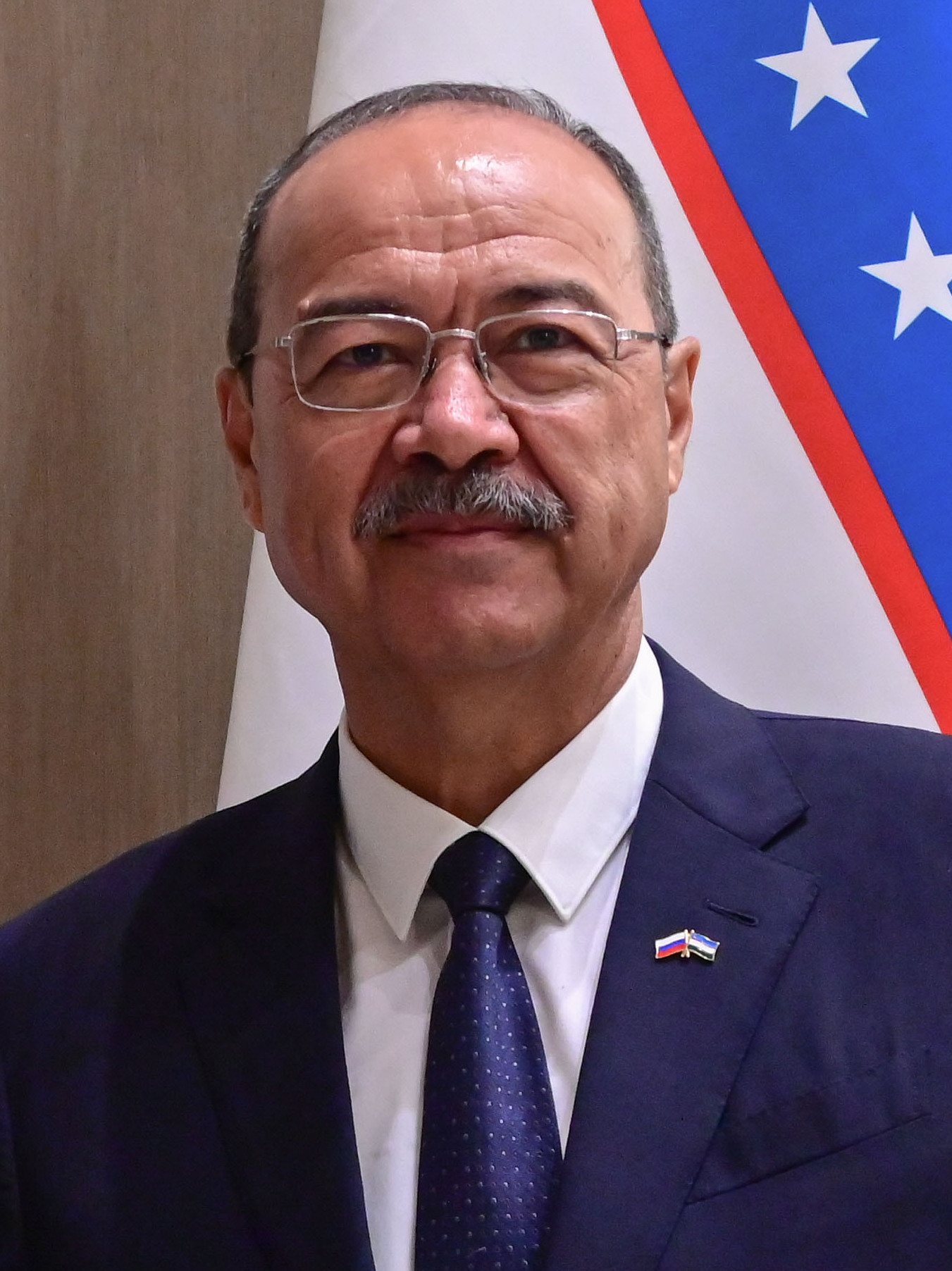
- Aripov in 2024

4th Prime Minister of Uzbekistan
- Incumbent
- Assumed office 14 December 2016
- President: Shavkat Mirziyoyev
- First Deputy: Ochilboy Ramatov
- Preceded by: Shavkat Mirziyoyev

Deputy Prime Minister of Uzbekistan
- In office 12 September 2016 – 14 December 2016 Serving with Rustam Azimov
- Prime Minister: Shavkat Mirziyoyev
- Preceded by: Ergash Shoismatov
- Succeeded by: Achilbay Ramatov
- In office 30 May 2002 – August 2012 Serving with Rustam Azimov, Achilbay Ramatov, Zoyir Mirzaev, Gulomjon Ibragimov
- Prime Minister: O‘tkir Sultonov; Shavkat Mirziyoyev
- Succeeded by: Ergash Shoismatov

Personal details
- Born: 24 May 1961 (age 65) Tashkent, Uzbek SSR, Soviet Union
- Party: Liberal Democratic Party
- Education: Tashkent University of Information Technologies
- Awards: Order "Mehnat Shuhrati"

Abdulla Nigmatovich Aripov (born 24 May 1961) is an Uzbek engineer and politician who has served as prime minister of Uzbekistan since 2016. A member of the Uzbekistan Liberal Democratic Party, he previously served as deputy prime minister from 2002 to 2012 and again in 2016.

== Career ==
=== Politics ===
On 30 May 2002, Aripov was appointed as Deputy Prime Minister of Uzbekistan – Head of Complex on Information and Telecommunications Technologies Issues – Director-General of Communications and Information Agency of Uzbekistan. Then from October 2009 – oversees the Social Sphere, Science, Education, Health, Culture and responsible for contacts with CIS-partners. On February 4, 2005 Aripov was appointed as deputy prime minister. Then in a reshuffle in August 2012 he was appointed Head of Complex on Information Systems and Telecommunications.

In September 2016 he was again appointed as deputy prime minister.

On 12 December 2016, he was nominated by the ruling party to form a cabinet. On 14 December, he was confirmed as prime minister on a joint session of the Oliy Majlis, and sworn in by President Shavkat Mirziyoyev. On 15 December, he formed his cabinet. On 17 August 2024, Aripov went to Kabul, making him the highest-ranking foreign official to visit Afghanistan since the return of the Taliban in 2021.

Following the 2024 parliamentary election, Aripov was re-nominated by Mirziyoyev and confirmed through secret ballot on 20 November 2024.

== Personal life ==
Aripov is married and has five daughters. He is a recipient of the state awards Order of Friendship of Uzbekistan and “Mehnat shuhrati” (Friendship and Labor Glory).

Political offices
Preceded by Shavkat Mirziyoyev	Prime Minister of Uzbekistan; 2016–present	Incumbent
