= Tolepbergen Qayibergenov =

Tolepbegen Qayipbergenov
- Төлепберген Қайыпбергенов
- Born: May 7, 1929; Aul Shortanbay, Kegeyli District, Karakalpakstan
- Died: September 14, 2010 (aged 81)
- Occupation: Writer
- Known for: Recipient of the orders of People's Poet of Uzbekistan and People's Poet of the Karakalpak ASSR

Tolepbegen Qayipbergenov (Karakalpak: Төлепберген Қайыпбергенов; born May 7, 1929, in Aul Shortanbay, Kegeyli District, Karakalpakstan; died September 14, 2010) was a Soviet-Karakalpak writer. He was a recipient of the orders of People's Poet of Uzbekistan and People's Poet of the Karakalpak ASSR.

== Life ==
In 1947, Qayipbergenov graduated from the Khojalinsky Pedagogical School and then began his professional career as a teacher. After graduating from the Karakalpak State Pedagogical Institute in 1955, he worked as a literary employee of the literary-artistic magazine “Амударья” (Amudarya) of the Karakalpak Writers’ Union. From 1955 to 1957 he worked for the magazine “Амударья” (Amudarya), from 1955 to 1957 he was also editor of the Karakalpak radio, before he served as managing director of the Karakalpakstan Writers’ Association for a year in 1957–1958. In 1958–1959 he was deputy director of Karakalpak Radio. From 1959 to 1960 he was editor of the newspaper “Жас Ленинши” (Jaz Leninshi), before he held the position of director of the Karakalpak State Publishing House from 1960 to 1962. From 1964 to 1967 he was editor of the State Committee for Television and Radio Broadcasting of the Karakalpak ASSR. In the period from 1967 to 1980 he worked as chairman of the State Committee for Printing, Book Printing and Book Trade at the Council of Ministers of the Karakalpak ASSR.

In 1980, he was elected chairman of the Karakalpak Writers’ Union with a majority of votes at the congress, replacing Ibroyim Yusupov from this position. He led the association until his death. Also in 1980, he was elected deputy chairman of the Uzbek Writers’ Union and thus to the governing bodies of the USSR Writers’ Union.

In 1982, on his initiative, Literary Days of the Union Republics of the USSR were held in Karakalpakstan for the first time.

In 1987, Qayipbergenov was elected deputy chairman of the Supreme Council of Karakalpakstan and headed the Writers’ Union at the same time.

From 1989 to 1991 he was a People's Deputy of the Soviet Union and a member of the Council of Nationalities of the Supreme Council of the USSR.

In 1995 he was elected chairman of the board of the Assembly of Cultures of the Peoples of Central Asia Foundation.

== Literary creation ==
In 1951, his first poem, “Тилегим” (Tilegim), was published in the newspaper “Жас Ленинши” (Shas Leninschi). In 1955 his work “Почтальон келгенде” (Postman Kelgende) was also published in the newspaper “Жas Ленинши”. In 1956 his first story entitled “Секретарь” (Secretary) was published.

Since then he has written in the prose genre. In total, about 100 books were published in Karakalpak, Uzbek, Russian, Turkish and other languages (virtually in all languages of the Union Republics). The writer's short stories and novels include “Спасибо, учитель” (Thank You, Teacher), “Ледяная капля” (Ice Drop), “Секретарь” (Secretary), “Дочь Каракалпакии” (Daughter of Karakalpakstan).

=== Film adaptation ===
1981: “Непокорная” (Unconquered) — based on the novel “Daughter of Karakalpakstan”.

== Awards ==
- State Prize of the Berdakh Prize of Karakalpakstan for the dialogue series “The Daughter of Karakalpak” (1967)
- State Hamza Prize for the story “Thank You, Teacher!” (1971)
- People's Poet of the Karakalpak ASSR (1974)
- USSR State Prize for the trilogy “Dastan about the Karakalpaks” (“Сказание о Маман-бие” (Legend of Maman-bi), “Несчастные” (Unhappy), “Неприкаянные” (Unbound). (1986)
- People's Poet of Uzbekistan (1993)
- International Mahmud Kashgari Prize for the novel “Karakalpakname” (1995)
- International M.A. Sholokhov Prize in Literature and Art (2004)
- Order of the Badge of Honor (8 May 1979)
- Hero of Uzbekistan (25 August 2003)
- Order of "Respected by the People and the Motherland" (1999)
- Order of Friendship (1994)
- Medal of Shurhat

He was repeatedly elected as a deputy of the Joqarǵi Keńes of the Republic of Karakalpakstan and the Nukus City Council.
