= Ibrayım Yusupov =

Uzbekistani academic, poet, translator and playwright

Ibroyim Yusupov
- Ibrayım Yusupov
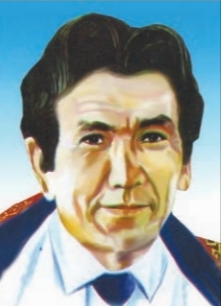
- Born: Ibroyim Yusup Oxun Sayekeev; May 5, 1929; Azat village, Chimboy District, Karakalpakstan
- Died: July 24, 2008 (aged 79); Nukus, Karakalpakstan
- Education: Karakalpak Pedagogical Institute
- Occupations: Poet, translator, playwright, teacher
- Spouse: Bibizada Jumanazarova
- Writing career
- Language: Karakalpak, Uzbek
- Notable work: Anthem of the Republic of Karakalpakstan

Ibroyim Yusupov (Karakalpak: Ibrayım Yusupov; 5 May 1929 – 24 July 2008) was a Soviet, Karakalpak and Uzbek poet, teacher, translator and playwright. He was the People’s Poet of Uzbekistan and Karakalpakstan. He was also the Hero of Uzbekistan (2004).

He was the author of the text of the State Anthem of the Republic of Karakalpakstan.

== Biography ==
He was born on 5 May 1929 in Azat village (now in Chimboy District) of Karakalpakstan. His father, Yusup Oxun Sayekeyev (1875–1931), was a religious leader and a large landowner, who participated in armed rebellions against the Soviet regime with local Basmachi fighters. Yusup Oxun Sayekeev belonged to the lineage of the "Anna" Karakalpak tribal leaders (biys). He was arrested in 1931 on charges of banditry and exiled to Turkmenistan, where he died. His mother, Xanbibi, raised two sons and four daughters. At the age of eleven, he started working to support his family. He studied at the Karakalpak Pedagogical Institute. After graduating from the institute in 1949, he taught literature there. In 1952, he was accused of collaborating with bourgeois-nationalist groups, and a criminal case was opened against him. However, he was acquitted due to "lack of evidence".

From 1961 to 1962, he was the editor-in-chief of the "Amudarya" journal, and then he worked as a researcher at the Institute of Language, Literature and History of the Academy of Sciences of Karakalpak. From 1965 to 1980, he was the chairman of the Writers’ Union of the Karakalpak Autonomous Soviet Socialist Republic.

On his initiative, the Days of Karakalpak Culture were held for the first time in many cities of the USSR, including Moscow, Kiev, Alma-Ata, Vilnius, and other cities. From 1980 to 1985, he was the chairman of the Peace Committee of Karakalpakstan and the director of the Center for Spirituality and Education.

In 1990, he was criticized for his anti-Soviet activities because of his poem "Where have they brought us," which sharply criticized the policies of M. Gorbachev.

In 2004, on the occasion of the adoption of the Constitution of Uzbekistan, the President of Uzbekistan, Islam Karimov, awarded Ibroyim Yusupov the title of Hero of Uzbekistan and the "Golden Star" medal. President Karimov called Yusupov "one of the weapons of Uzbekistan." He said, "We should have given this title to Yusupov much earlier. I am very proud to be a contemporary and friend of such a great man and poet".

He married Bibizada Jumanazarova, the daughter of Mateka Jumanazarov, the chairman of the Presidium of Karakalpakstan (1941–1960). He was personally acquainted with Sharof Rashidov, the first secretary of the Central Committee of the Communist Party of Uzbekistan.

== Career ==
He was the People’s Poet of Uzbekistan and Karakalpakstan (1975), and the Hero of Uzbekistan (2004). He graduated from the Karakalpak Pedagogical Institute in 1949. He was a teacher at the same institute (1949–1961), the editor-in-chief of the "Amudarya" journal (1961–1962), a researcher, a sector head at the Institute of History, Language, and Literature named after N. Dovqorayev, the chairman of the Writers’ Union of Karakalpakstan (1965–1980), the editor-in-chief of the "Soviet Karakalpakstan" newspaper (1980–1985), and the director of the Center for Spirituality and Education of Karakalpakstan (1985–2000).

== Works ==
His first poems were published in the mid-1940s. He has more than 30 collections of poetry and prose. He is the author of the plays "Forty Girls" (with A. Shomuratov, 1965), "The Fate of the Actress" (1967), "Umirbek’s Law" (1971), "Mangu Spring" (1971), and the libretto of "Ajiniyoz." Yusupov’s poems "To the Sunrise Traveler," "Do not Praise Karakalpak too Much, in my Opinion," "Black Hill," "Cranes," and others are the high examples of Karakalpak literature. In addition, Yusupov’s epics "Where the Acacia Blooms," "The Truth about the Carpet Weaver Woman," "The Deserts of Joy," "Mangu Spring" are also considered to be the greatest achievements of the 20th-century Karakalpak literature.

His works "The Springs Boil" (1960), "The Golden Hoop" (1962), "The Deserts of Joy" (1967), "The Desert Eagle" (1972), "Black Hill" (1988), and others have been published in Uzbek.

He translated the works of the classics of world literature into Karakalpak (Mangu Springs, 1986). He was the laureate of the Karakalpakstan State Prize named after Berdaq (1974). Ibroyim Yusupov is considered to be the author of the state anthem of Karakalpakstan. His poem "Dear Friends" was translated into Uzbek by Muhammad Ali.

== Awards ==
- Hero of Uzbekistan (25 August 2004)
- "El-yurt hurmati" order (5 April 1999)
- "Do'stlik" order
- Order of the Red Banner of Labor (5 April 1979)
- Medal "For Distinguished Labour" (18 March 1959)
- People’s Poet of Uzbekistan

== Death ==
I. Yusupov’s death was mourned by the first President of the country, I. Karimov. He was buried in the "Shorsha Bobo" cemetery in Nukus.
