= Juweri gurtik =

Traditional Karakalpak meat and dumplings dish

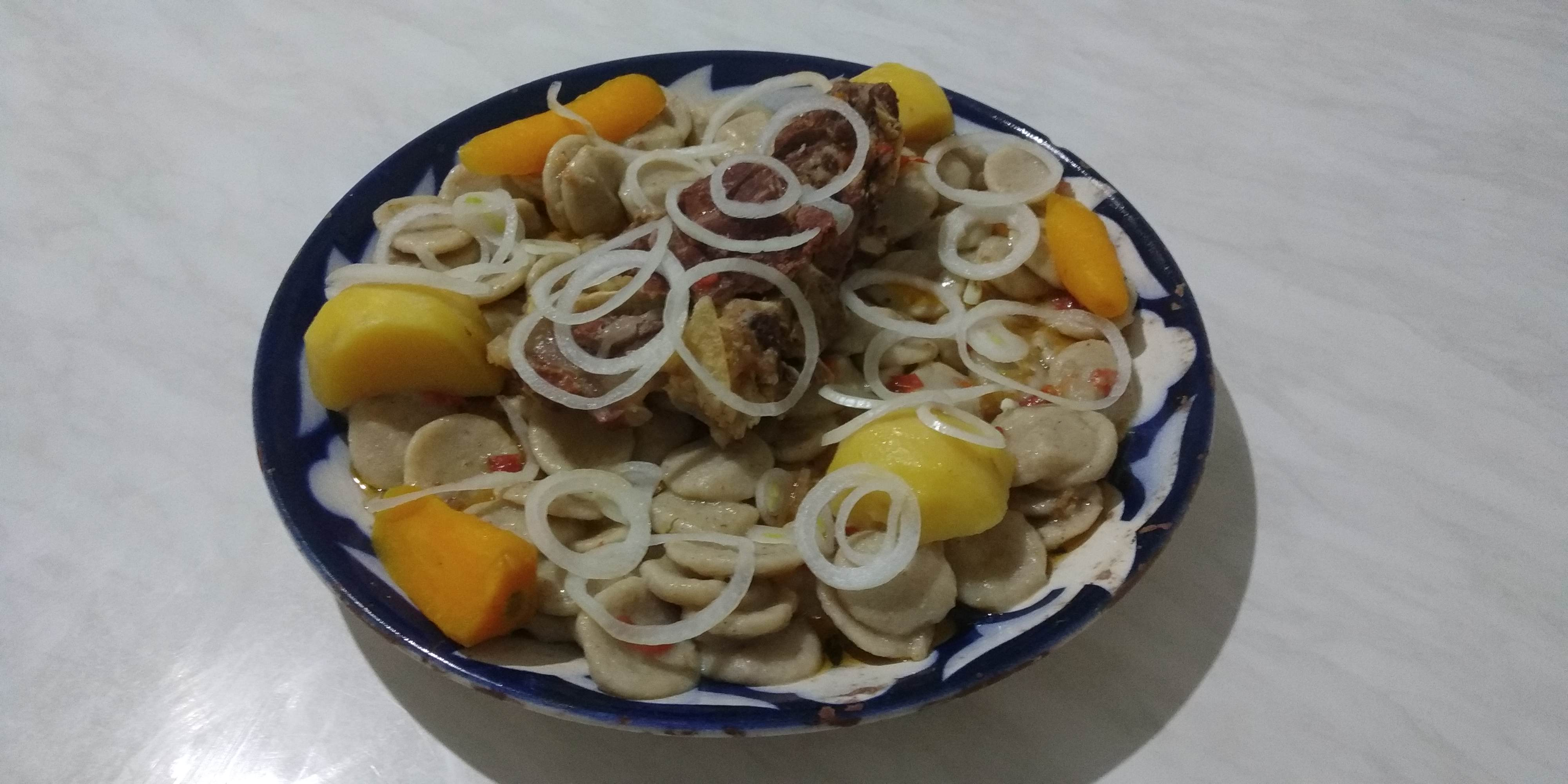
- Juweri gurtik
- Course: Meal
- Place of origin: Karakalpakstan, Uzbekistan
- Region or state: Central Asia
- Main ingredients: Sorghum flour dumplings with meat, cooked with onions, potatoes and carrots

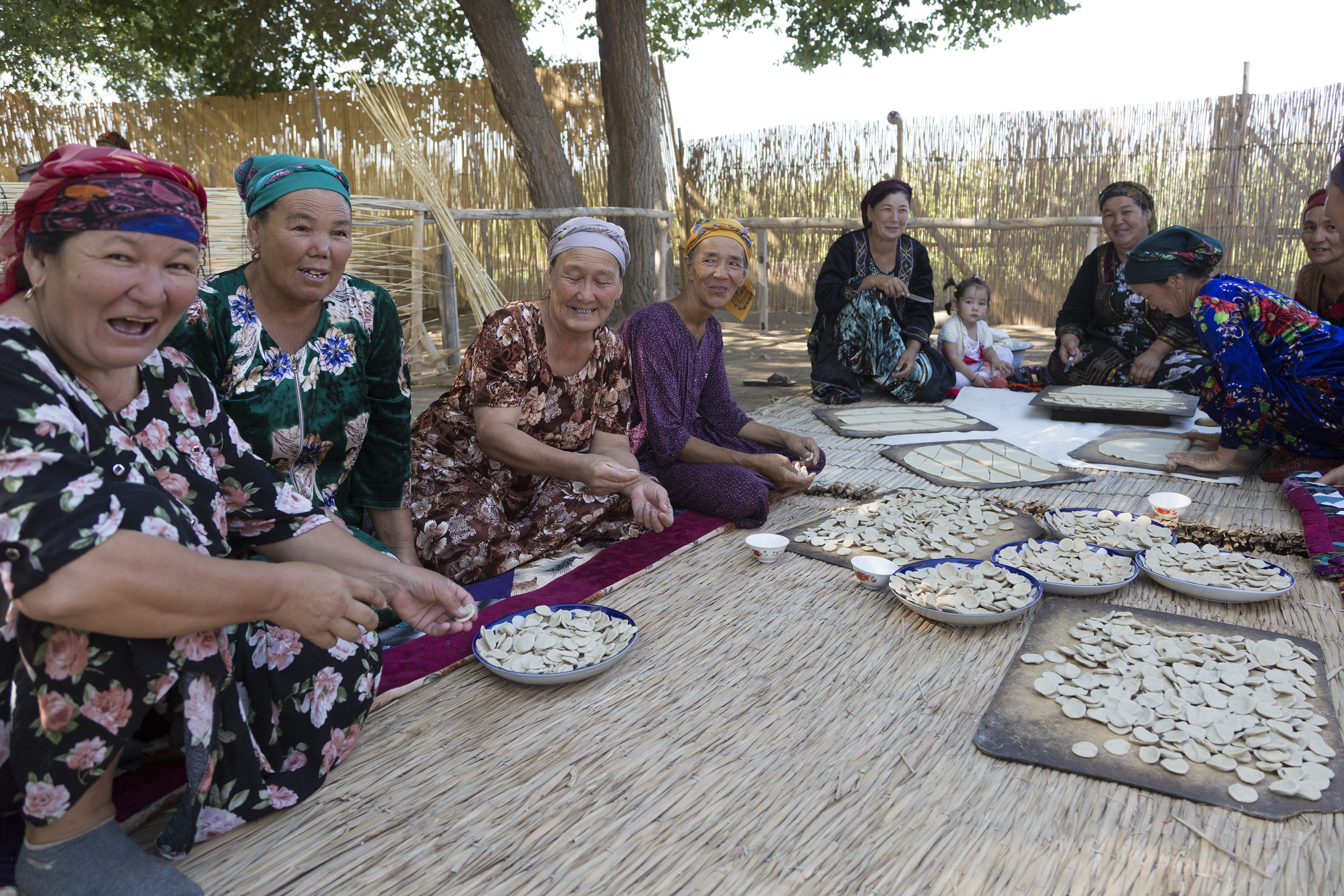
Karakalpak women preparing the dumplings needed for Júweri gúrtik.

Júweri gúrtik is a traditional Karakalpak dish that is considered the national dish of Karakalpakstan. It is made of sorghum flour dumplings and meat cooked with onions, potatoes, and carrots.

== Preparation ==
Júweri gúrtik is prepared by stuffing a mixture of lamb, beef or turkey meat into a coin-shaped dough made from sorghum flour. The dumplings are cooked in a meat stock with potatoes, onion and carrots.

== "Júweri gúrtik" Day ==
On February 25, 2023, the initiative to widely celebrate the "Júweri gúrtik" Day in the Republic of Karakalpakstan was launched by the Khojaly District Administration together with the Ministry of Tourism and Cultural Heritage, the Association of Chefs of the Republic of Karakalpakstan, and a team of the Specialized School of Culture No. 1 of Nukus. The largest portion of Júweri gúrtik was prepared at the presidential school in Nukus. A total of 20 turkeys, 35 kg of sorghum flour and 15 kg of wheat flour were used in the preparation of the dish. The prepared dish was served on a "plate" measuring 3.5 x 2.5 meters in diameter. "Júweri gúrtik" Day was also celebrated together by Karakalpaks residing in Russia, Kazakhstan, Kyrgyzstan, South Korea, and other countries. This festival has continued to be celebrated on the same date each year since then.

== See also ==
- Bawırsaq - type of fried dough food found in the cuisines of Central Asia
- Palaw - rice and meat dish common to Central and West Asia
- Manti - meat dumpling dish common to Central Asia and West Asia
