= Karakalpak Autonomous Oblast =

1925–1932 autonomous oblast of the Russian SFSR, Soviet Union

Kara-Kalpak Autonomous Oblast قارا قالپاق اپتانومىيالى وبلىسى Қарақалпақ автономиялы облысы Qaraqalpaq avtonomiialy oblysy (Kazakh) Кара-Калпакская автономная область (Russian)
- Autonomous oblast of the Russian SFSR
- 1925–1932
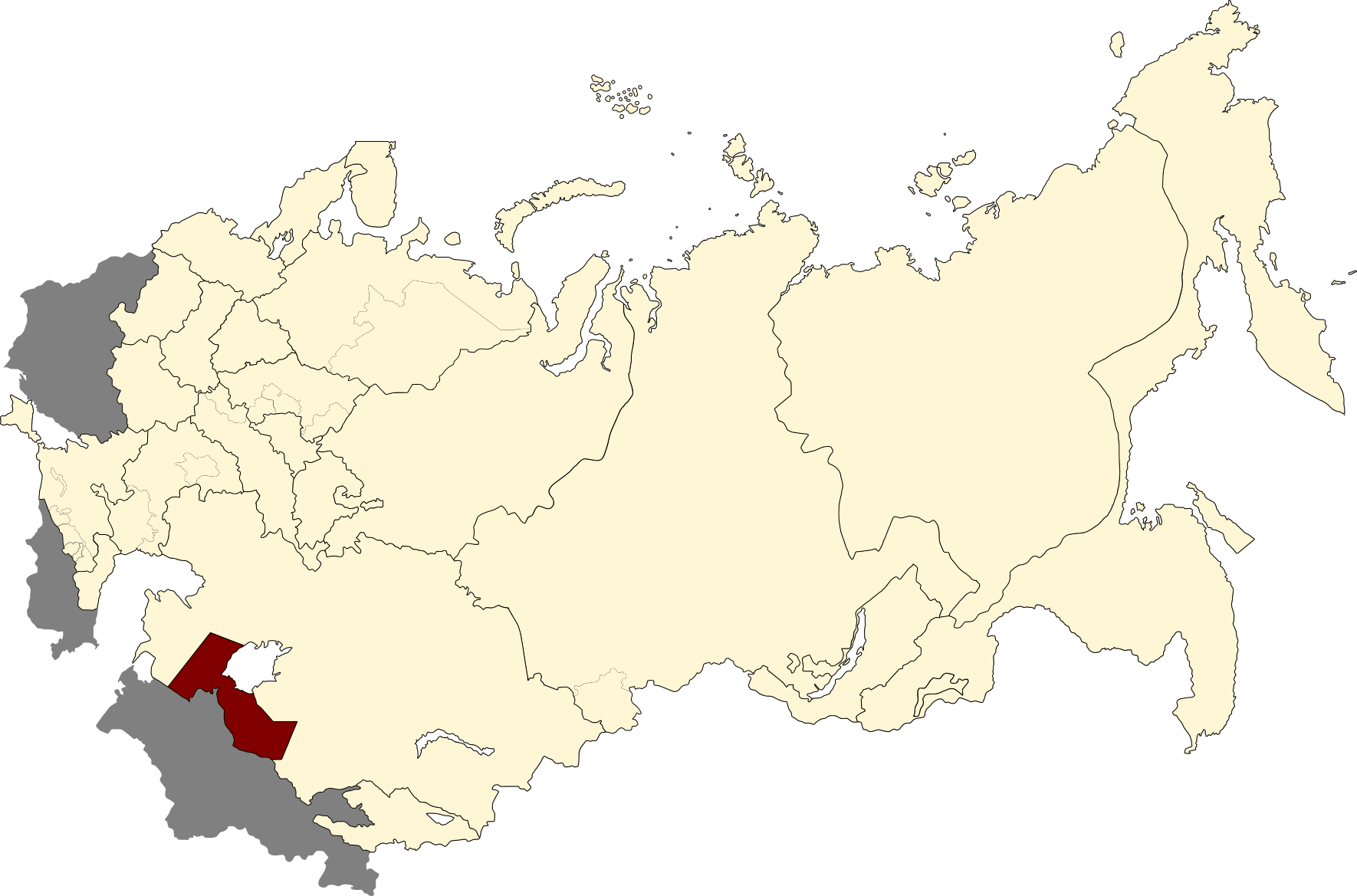
- Capital: Turtkul
- Historical era: Interwar period
  - Established: 19 February 1925
  - Disestablished: 20 March 1932
Preceded by	Succeeded by
Turkestan ASSR; Khorezm SSR	Karakalpak ASSR

Karakalpak Autonomous Oblast was created on February 19, 1925 by separating lands of the ethnic Karakalpaks from the Turkestan Autonomous Soviet Socialist Republic and Khorezm People's Soviet Republic.

Initially located within the Kirghiz Autonomous Socialist Soviet Republic (which was later renamed to Kazakh Autonomous Soviet Socialist Republic), the Karakalpak AO was transferred to the Russian Soviet Federative Socialist Republic from July 20, 1930 to March 20, 1932, at which time it was elevated to the Karakalpak Autonomous Soviet Socialist Republic (Karakalpak ASSR). The Karakalpak ASSR was joined to the Uzbek SSR from December 5, 1936.

== Administrative Subdivisions ==
Karakalpak Autonomous Oblast was divided into the below districts (Kazakh: аудан, اۋدان):

1. Shımbay
2. Toʻrtkoʻl
3. Tomdi (now part of Navoiy Region)
4. Shayiq Abaz
5. Kegeyli
6. Dayqara Kok Ozek (Dark blue river)
7. Xojeli
8. Qitay Qipshaq
9. Qońirat
10. Taldiq

== See also ==
- First Secretary of the Karakalpak Communist Party
