= Delta Blues (film) =

Delta Blues (In a Land of Cotton)
- Directed by: M.E. van der Tuuk
- Starring: Oral Ataniyazova; Yusup Kamalov; Meryem Aslan; Max Spoor; Ian Small; Scott O'Connor; Sagitzjan Aitzjanov; Frits Verhoog; Rashid Koshekov; Bakhtiyar Zhollybekov
- Cinematography: M.E. van der Tuuk
- Edited by: M.E. van der Tuuk
- Music by: M.E. van der Tuuk; Bazargul Karimova
- Release date: 2001
- Country: Netherlands
- Language: English / Dutch / Russian

Delta Blues (In a Land of Cotton) is a 2001 documentary film. The movie deals with the environmental problems emanating from the drying up of the Aral Sea, and the impact this has on political relationships in the Central Asian region (especially Uzbekistan, Kazakhstan, Kyrgyzstan, and Turkmenistan). In particular, it focuses on the document Water-related vision for the Aral Sea basin for the year 2025 by UNESCO, as presented in 2000 at the 2nd World Water Forum in The Hague. This document has been criticized for setting unrealistic goals, and also, by focusing on the entire basin (south-west Kazakhstan, Uzbekistan, Turkmenistan), for implicitly giving up on the Aral Sea and the people living downstream in Karakalpakstan.

== Interviewees ==
- Oral Ataniyazova (foundation Perzent, Nukus)
- Yusup Kamalov (Union for Defence of the Aral Sea and Amudarya river (UDASA), Nukus)
- Meryem Aslan (Oxfam Novib, The Hague)
- Max Spoor (Institute of Social Studies, The Hague)
- Ian Small (Médecins Sans Frontières, Nukus)
- Scott O'Connor (Central Asia Free Exchange)
- Sagitzjan Aitzjanov (Central Asia Free Exchange, Muynak)
- Frits Verhoog (UNESCO, Paris)
- Rashid Koshekov (Ministry of Water, Karakalpakstan)
- Bakhtiyar Zhollybekov (Tashkent Agrarian University, Nukus)
