= Shımbay =

Shimbay Шымбай, Shımbay
- City
- Shimbay
- Location in Uzbekistan
- Coordinates: 42°56′N 59°47′E
- Country: Uzbekistan
- Autonomous Republic: Karakalpakstan
- District: Shimbay District
- Elevation: 64 m (210 ft)

Population (2016)
  - Total: 50,400
- Time zone: UTC+5 (UZT)
- Area code: (+998) 6144

Shimbay (Karakalpak: Шымбай, Shımbay), also known as Chimbay (Russian: Чимбaй, romanized: Chimbay) is a city and seat of Shimbay district in Karakalpakstan. Its population is 50,400 (2016).

One of the ancient yurt workshops of Karakalpakstan is located in Shimbay, near the old Russian house. The yurt masters make Karakalpak yurts and have their own unique technique, which is passed through generations to generations of the yurt-craftsmen.

== Climate ==
Shimbay has a cold desert climate (Köppen climate classification BWk), with cold winters and hot summers. Rainfall is generally light and erratic, and occurs mainly in the winter and autumn months.

Climate data for Shimbay (1991–2020, extremes 1937–present)
Month	Jan	Feb	Mar	Apr	May	Jun	Jul	Aug	Sep	Oct	Nov	Dec	Year
Record high °C (°F)	17.0 (62.6)	27.7 (81.9)	33.1 (91.6)	38.0 (100.4)	43.5 (110.3)	43.3 (109.9)	46.5 (115.7)	46.0 (114.8)	41.0 (105.8)	33.8 (92.8)	27.2 (81.0)	21.2 (70.2)	46.5 (115.7)
Mean daily maximum °C (°F)	0.5 (32.9)	3.8 (38.8)	12.5 (54.5)	21.9 (71.4)	29.0 (84.2)	34.1 (93.4)	35.6 (96.1)	34.0 (93.2)	27.4 (81.3)	19.6 (67.3)	9.3 (48.7)	2.3 (36.1)	19.2 (66.5)
Daily mean °C (°F)	−4.3 (24.3)	−2.1 (28.2)	5.6 (42.1)	14.5 (58.1)	21.6 (70.9)	26.7 (80.1)	28.2 (82.8)	25.9 (78.6)	18.9 (66.0)	11.2 (52.2)	3.0 (37.4)	−2.6 (27.3)	12.2 (54.0)
Mean daily minimum °C (°F)	−8.3 (17.1)	−6.9 (19.6)	−0.3 (31.5)	7.7 (45.9)	14.2 (57.6)	18.9 (66.0)	20.6 (69.1)	18.3 (64.9)	11.4 (52.5)	3.9 (39.0)	−2.3 (27.9)	−6.7 (19.9)	5.9 (42.6)
Record low °C (°F)	−33.7 (−28.7)	−29.6 (−21.3)	−22.6 (−8.7)	−10.4 (13.3)	−0.5 (31.1)	5.9 (42.6)	8.4 (47.1)	6.8 (44.2)	−3.6 (25.5)	−13.2 (8.2)	−25.5 (−13.9)	−29.7 (−21.5)	−33.7 (−28.7)
Average precipitation mm (inches)	11.2 (0.44)	11.9 (0.47)	19.2 (0.76)	18.8 (0.74)	21.0 (0.83)	7.1 (0.28)	2.5 (0.10)	2.4 (0.09)	3.4 (0.13)	8.1 (0.32)	15.2 (0.60)	10.5 (0.41)	131.3 (5.17)
Average extreme snow depth cm (inches)	2 (0.8)	2 (0.8)	0 (0)	0 (0)	0 (0)	0 (0)	0 (0)	0 (0)	0 (0)	0 (0)	0 (0)	1 (0.4)	2 (0.8)
Average rainy days	2	2	4	4	4	2	1	1	2	3	4	3	32
Average snowy days	5	3	2	0.3	0	0	0	0	0	0.2	1	4	16
Average relative humidity (%)	75	71	63	52	48	44	44	47	50	57	68	73	58
Mean monthly sunshine hours	104.9	136.6	194.8	243.2	323.1	364.8	384.4	363.2	290.6	234.9	147.4	106.5	2,894.4
Source 1: Pogoda.ru.net
Source 2: NOAA

== Transportation ==
The road south out of Shimbay connects to Xaliqabat and Nukus. Another road leads northeast to Qaraózek and Taxtakópir.
