= Oral Ataniyazova =

Uzbek obstetrician and medical scientist

- Occupations: Obstetrician and medical scientist
- Awards: Goldman Environmental Prize (2000)

Oral Ataniyazova (Karakalpak: Атаниязова Орал) is a Karakalpak obstetrician and medical scientist from Karakalpakstan, Uzbekistan. She is the director of Perzent, the Karakalpak Center for Reproductive Health and Environment.

== Biography ==
Oral Ataniyazova was awarded the Goldman Environmental Prize in 2000. A year later, she became the rector of Nokis branch of Tashkent Pediatric Medical Institute. The institute trains students in the field of environmental medicine, focusing on the human health nourishment that environmental pollution has caused. Moreover, Ataniyazova won a seat in the local Parliament of Republic Karakalpakstan in 2009. In a discussion about the impact The Goldman Prize has had on her career, she said that "These achievements helped me to be more helpful to my community and develop international collaboration to improve the environmental situation in my country.” She currently lives in Nokis.

After completing her PhD in medical sciences in Moscow, Ataniyazova conducted a survey in 1992 of 5,000 reproductive-age women in Karakalpakstan. The results were shocking, with over 90% of all women surveyed having some form of complication during pregnancy and/or childbirth. This has been attributed to the ecological disaster around the Aral Sea, which is located in Karakalpakstan. In response to these findings, Ataniyazova founded the Karakalpak Center for Reproductive Health and Environment, named Perzent, which means progeny in the Karakalpak language. The center is located in the Nokis government hospital. It provides education to the local population about a wide range of issues, from family health to clean water and food.

Ataniyazova works to promote awareness of the problems around the Aral Sea. Using her expertise in reproductive health, she has been the keynote speaker for many world conferences, and has addressed the United Nations.
