= Qaraozek =

Qaraozek Қараөзек, Qaraózek
- Town
- Qaraozek
- Location in Uzbekistan
- Coordinates: 43°01′39″N 60°00′45″E
- Country: Uzbekistan
- Autonomous Republic: Karakalpakstan
- District: Karaozek district
- Elevation: 61 m (200 ft)

Population (2005)
  - Total: 12,300
- Time zone: UTC+05:00 (UZT)

Qaraozek, Karaozek, or also Karauzyak (Karakalpak: Қараөзек, Qaraózek) is a town and seat of Qaraozek district in Karakalpakstan in Uzbekistan. The town population in 1989 was 10,656 people.

Famous Karakalpak personalities as Allayar Dosnazarov, one of the founders of Karakalpak Autonomous Oblast and Karakalpak journalist, lawyer Dauletmurat Tazhimuratov were born in Karaozek.
