= Karakalpak rebellion (1855–1856) =

Rebellion against the Khanate of Khiva

Date	1855–1856
Location	Khanate of Khiva
Result	Khivan victory

Belligerents
Karakalpaks	Khanate of Khiva

Commanders and leaders
Ernazar Alaköz; Zarlık Khan	Seyid Muhammad Rahim Khan

The Karakalpak Rebellion, also called the Karakalpak Uprising, was a Karakalpak rebellion against the Khanate of Khiva by Ernazar Alaköz in 1855, in order to establish a Karakalpak Khanate.
