= Khoji Ishan Bobo Mausoleum =

Cultural heritage site in Karakalpakstan

Religion
- Region: Republic of Karakalpakstan

Location
- Location: Kipchoq district
- Country: Karakalpakstan

Architecture
- Established: 19th-20th century

Khoji Ishan Bobo Mausoleum (Uzbek: Xoji Ishan Bobo maqbarasi) is a cultural heritage of Karakalpakstan. It is an architectural monument. It was built in 19th-20th century. It stands in Qipchoq Urban-type settlement of Karakalpakstan. It is considered as the property of the Karakalpakstan. It was included in the national list of real estate objects of material cultural heritage by the Government of Karakalpakistan. It is protected by the state.
