= Berdakh =

Karakalpak poet

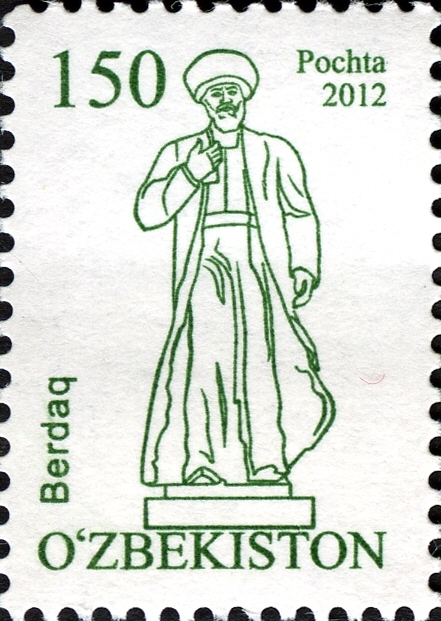
Berdakh on an Uzbek stamp in 2012

Berdakh, pseudonym of Berdimurat son of Gargabay (Karakalpak: Бердақ; Бердимурат Ғарғабай улы, 1827–1900) was a Karakalpak poet.

He was born in Karakalpakstan, in a remote village near modern-day Muynak. His father was a poor fisherman and his mother, who gave him the nickname Berdakh, died when he was 10 years old. His father also died while Berdakh was still a child, and so Berdakh became an orphan. Berdakh studied in a mektep and at the same time he grazed his fellow villagers' cattle. His brother helped him to go to Karakum madrasah, a Muslim religious school, but Berdakh dropped out from the school because of his freethinking poetry.

The young poet began to study folk poetry and narrative classical masterpieces of the East. His tutor Kunxoja (1799–1880), who was famous for his folk poetry, helped him with his poetry. Ajinyaz (1824–1878) another famous poet of that time, also played a significant role in Berdakh's life. For a long time Berdakh had to earn money playing the dutar at weddings. He sang his songs at weddings and different festive occasions. His songs were about the fate of a deprived man whose life was very hard. His most famous poems are: Ahmaq patsha (Tsar Samodur in Russian) that shows his life and poetic experience and lyrical Bolģan emes, which describes the struggles and hardships of Karakalpak people. His other poems included Xalıq ushın (For the people), Amangeldi, Aydosbiy, and Ernazarbiy.

During Berdakh's lifetime there was a rise in national liberation movements among the nations of the Aral Sea territory, especially among the Karakalpaks. Karakalpakia became a hotspot of discord among those nations. The khanate of Khiva considered Karakalpakia to be a nabob and was constantly imposed duties on its people. The Russian Empire was also interested in Karakalpakia as it was a gateway to Central Asia. Berdakh wrote not only about social problems but also about the protection of women's rights and dignity. He propagated equality and women's rights. His dream was to unite nations which were separated by different wars.
