= Aqmangit =

Akmangit Ақмаңғыт, Aqmańǵıt
- Town
- Akmangit
- Location in Uzbekistan
- Coordinates: 42°36′N 59°32′E
- Country: Uzbekistan
- Autonomous Republic: Karakalpakstan
- District: Nukus district

Population (2000)
  - Total: 8,100
- Time zone: UTC+5 (UZT)

Akmangit (Karakalpak: Ақмаңғыт, Aqmańǵıt) is a town and seat of Nukus district in Karakalpakstan in Uzbekistan. The town population in 1989 was 6,169 people.
