= Bozataw district =

Bozataw district Бозатаў районы, Bozataw rayonı
- District
- Bozataw district
- Location in Uzbekistan
- Coordinates: 43°01′N 59°21′E
- Country: Uzbekistan
- Autonomous Republic: Karakalpakstan
- Capital: Bozataw
- Established: 2019

Area
  - Total: 2,040 km^{2} (790 sq mi)

Population (2022)
  - Total: 21,800
  - Density: 10.7/km^{2} (27.7/sq mi)
- Time zone: UTC+5 (UZT)

Bozataw district (Karakalpak: Бозатаў районы, Bozataw rayonı) is a district of Karakalpakstan in Uzbekistan. The seat lies at the urban-type settlement Bozataw. It was created in September 2019 from parts of the Kegeyli district and the Shimbay district. Its area is 2,040 km^{2} (790 sq mi) and it had 21,800 inhabitants in 2022.

The district contains one town Bozataw and four village councils Aspantay, Erkindarya, Kok-suw and Qusqanataw.
