= Kyzyl-Kala =

Fortress and archaeological site in Uzbekistan

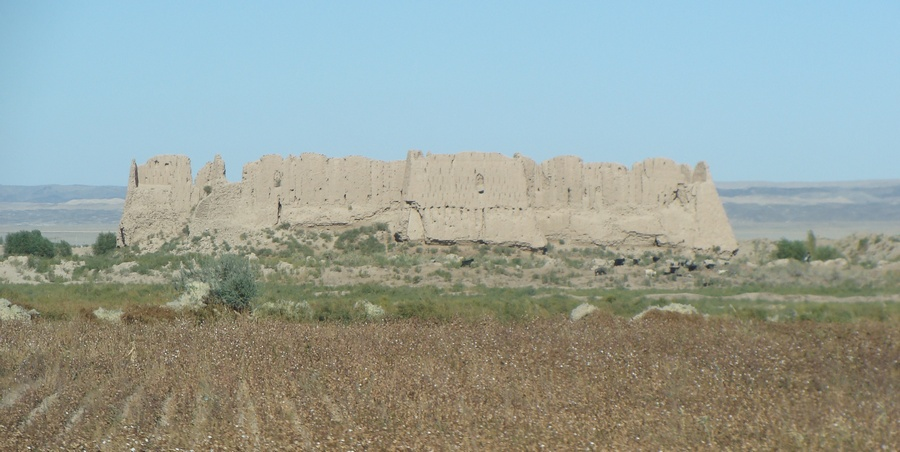
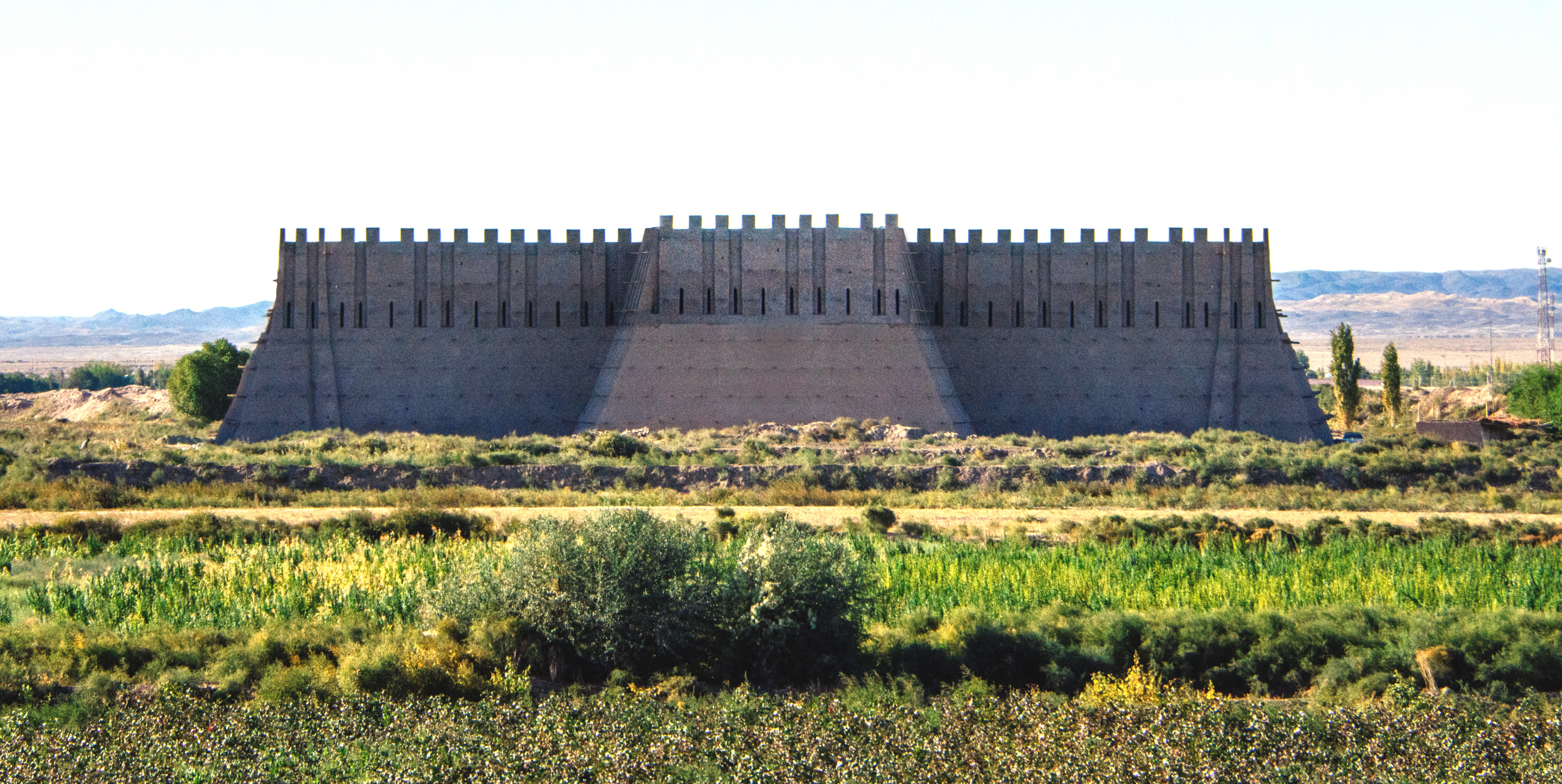
- Kyzyl-Kala fortress, 1st-4th century AD: original ruins, and reconstruction (left third portion simulated)

- Location within West and Central Asia Location within Uzbekistan Location within Karakalpakstan
- 41°55′48.1″N 60°47′02.8″E
- Type: Settlement
- Periods: Parthian, Sasanian
- Location: Karakalpakstan, Uzbekistan

Site notes
- Condition: Ruined

Kyzyl-Kala, also Qyzyl Qala ("Red fortress"), in modern Karakalpakstan, Uzbekistan, was an ancient fortress in Chorasmia built in the 1st-4th century CE. The small fortress of Kyzyl-Kala is located near Toprak-Kala, about 1 km to the west, and was also built in the 1st-4th century CE, possibly as a fortified defense for the site of Toprak-Kala. Kyzyl-Kala was once restored in the 12th century. It has also been the subject of a modern renovation program, with the objective of showing what a fortress looked like originally. It is part of the "Fifty fortresses oasis" in modern-day Uzbekistan. It was last occupied by Muhammad II of Khwarazm (1169, 1200-20), ruler of the Khwarazmian Empire, before it fell to the Mongol conquest of Khwarazmia.

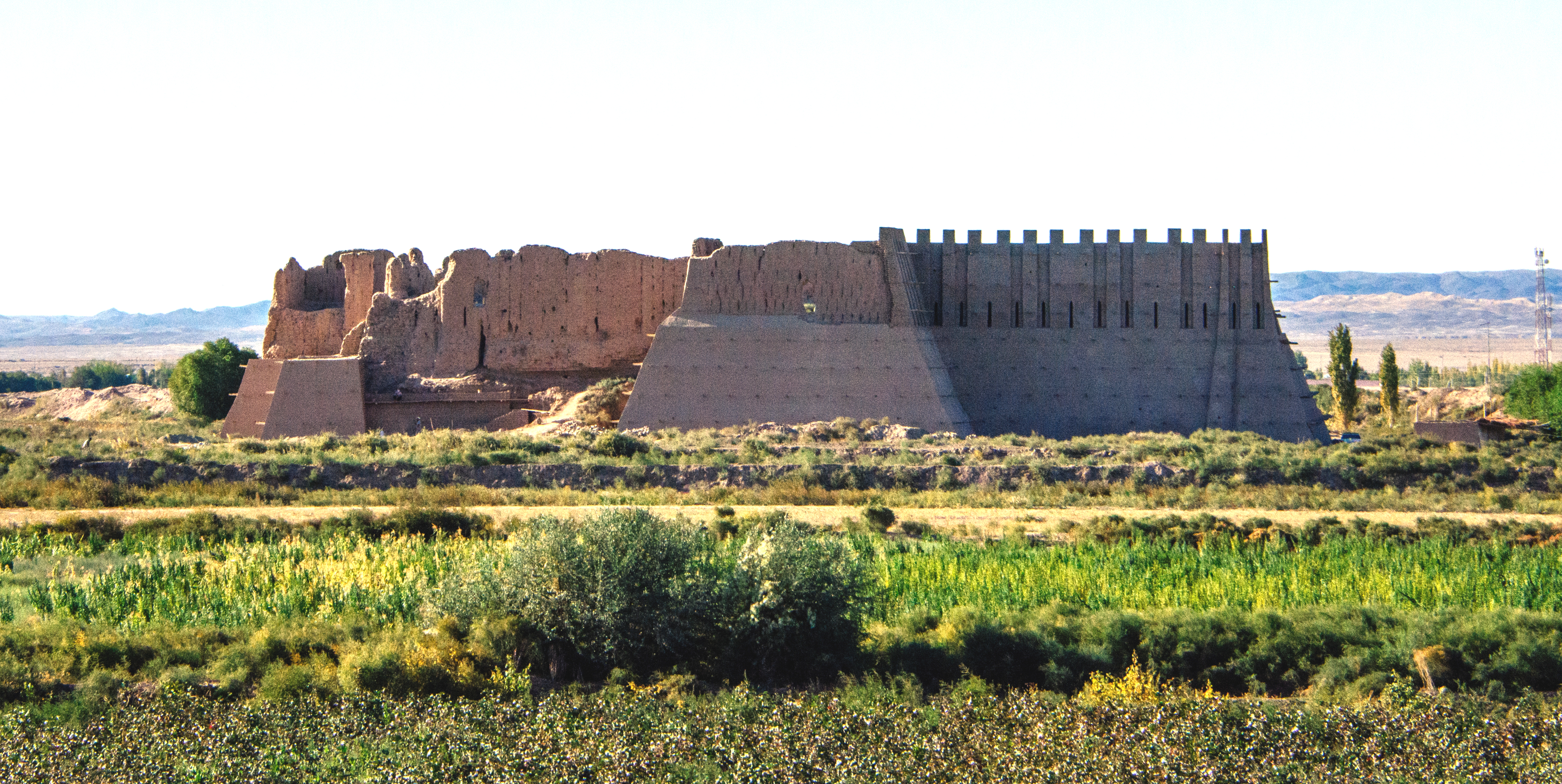
Kyzyl-Kala under restoration (2018)

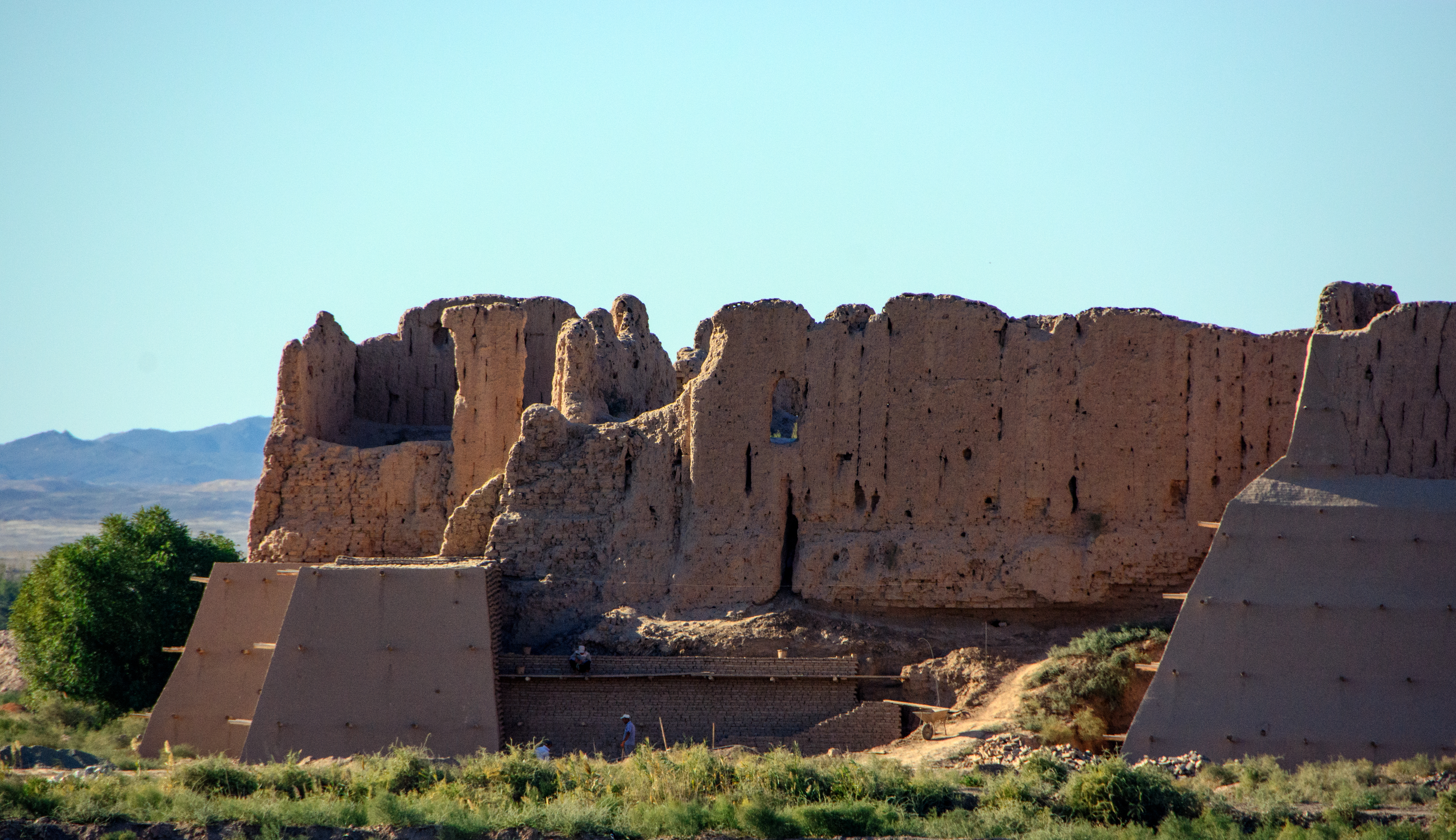
Old and new walls

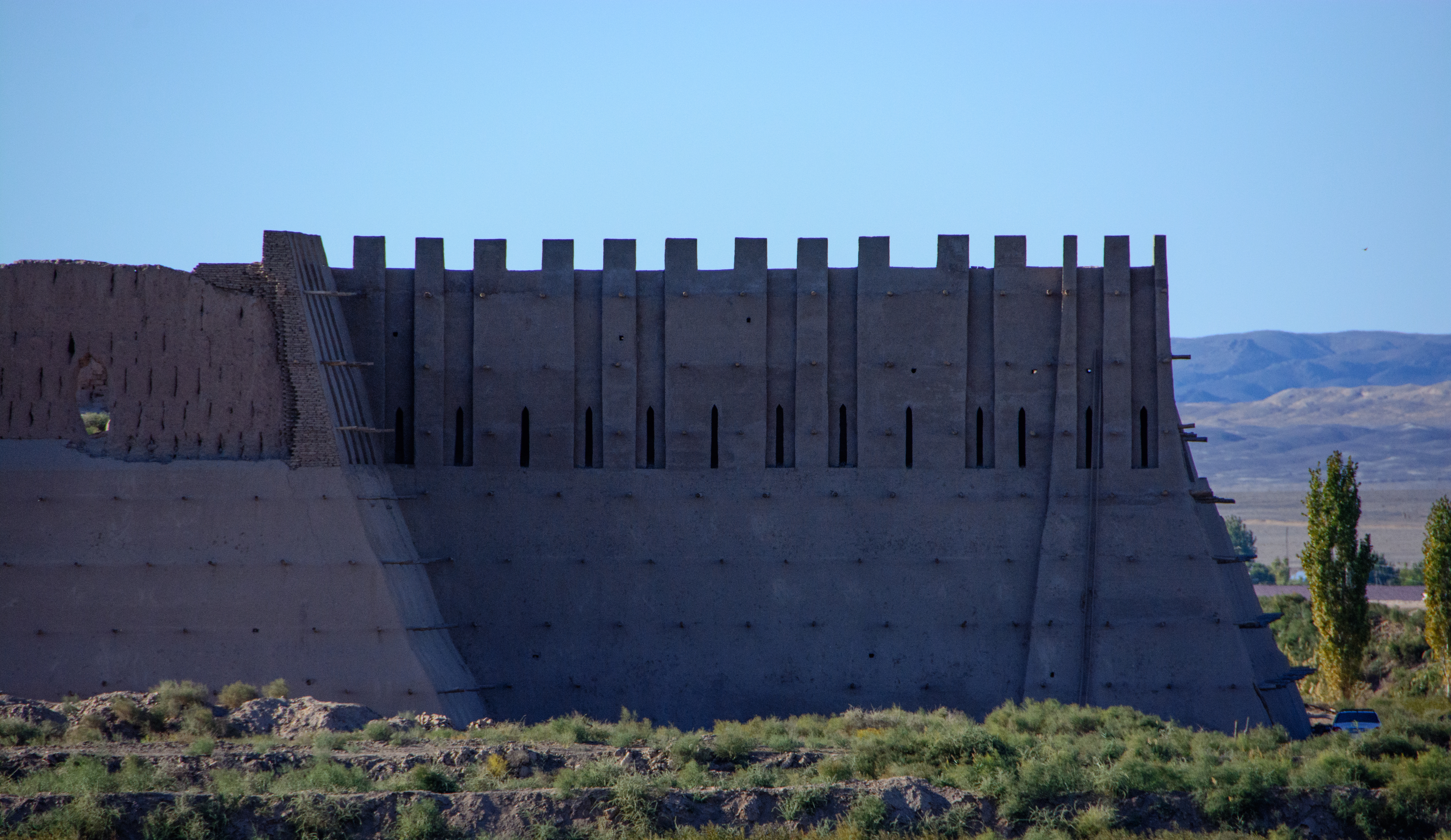
Kyzyk-Kala, details of new walls

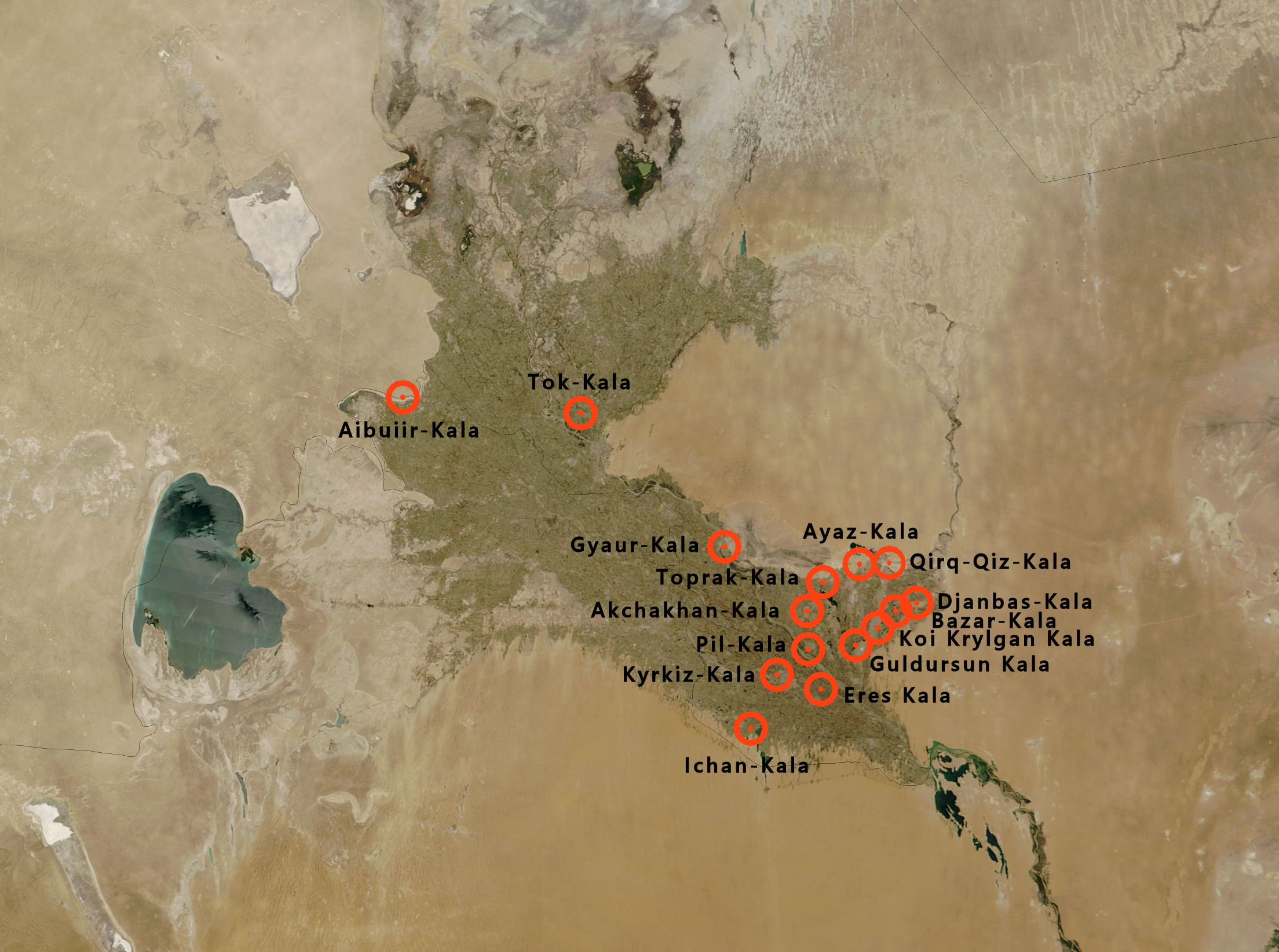
Location of the Kyzyl-Kala fortress, next to Toprak-Kala in the Chorasmian oasis, in relation to other main fortresses

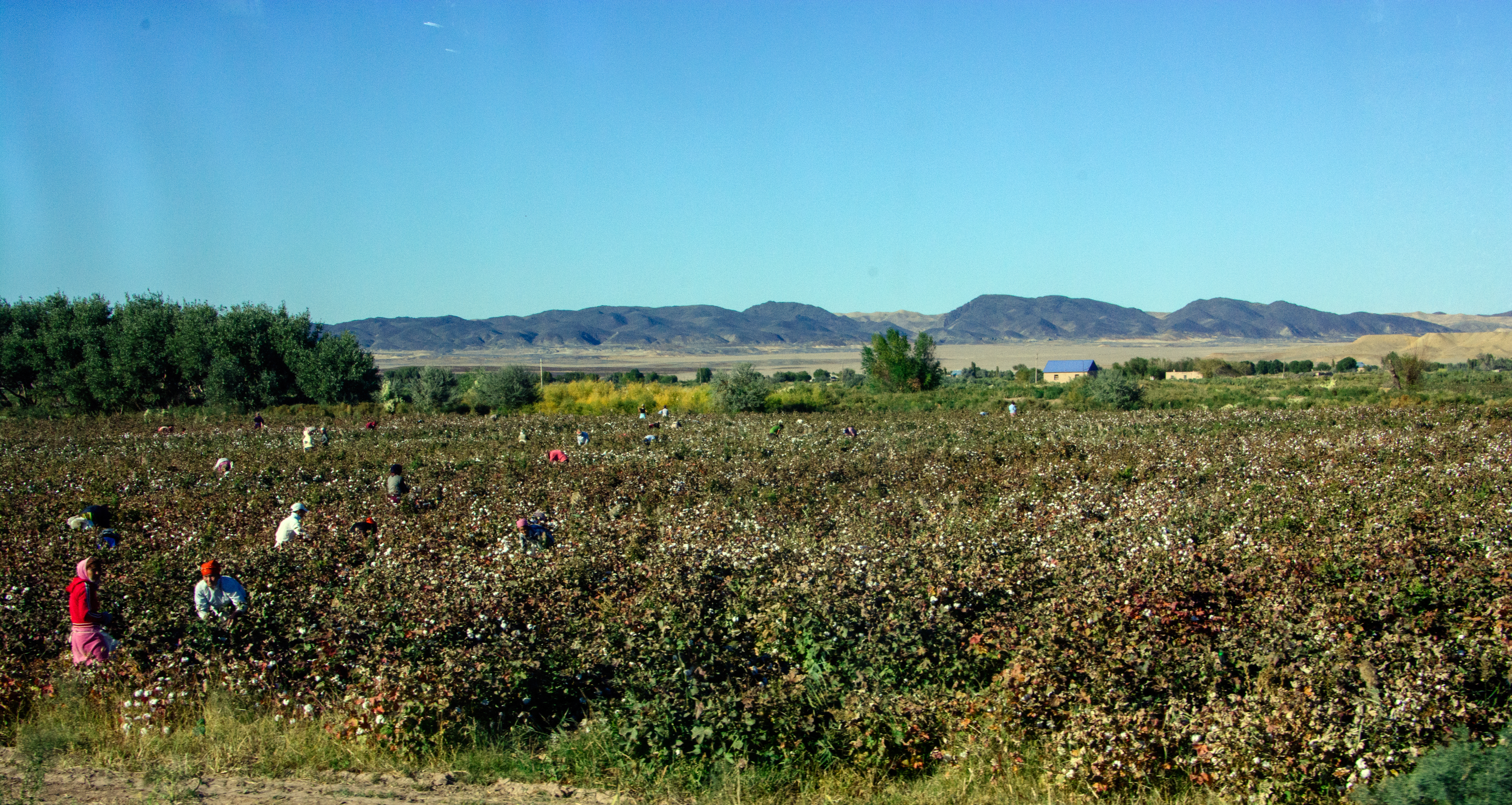
Cotton picking near Kyzyl-Kala.

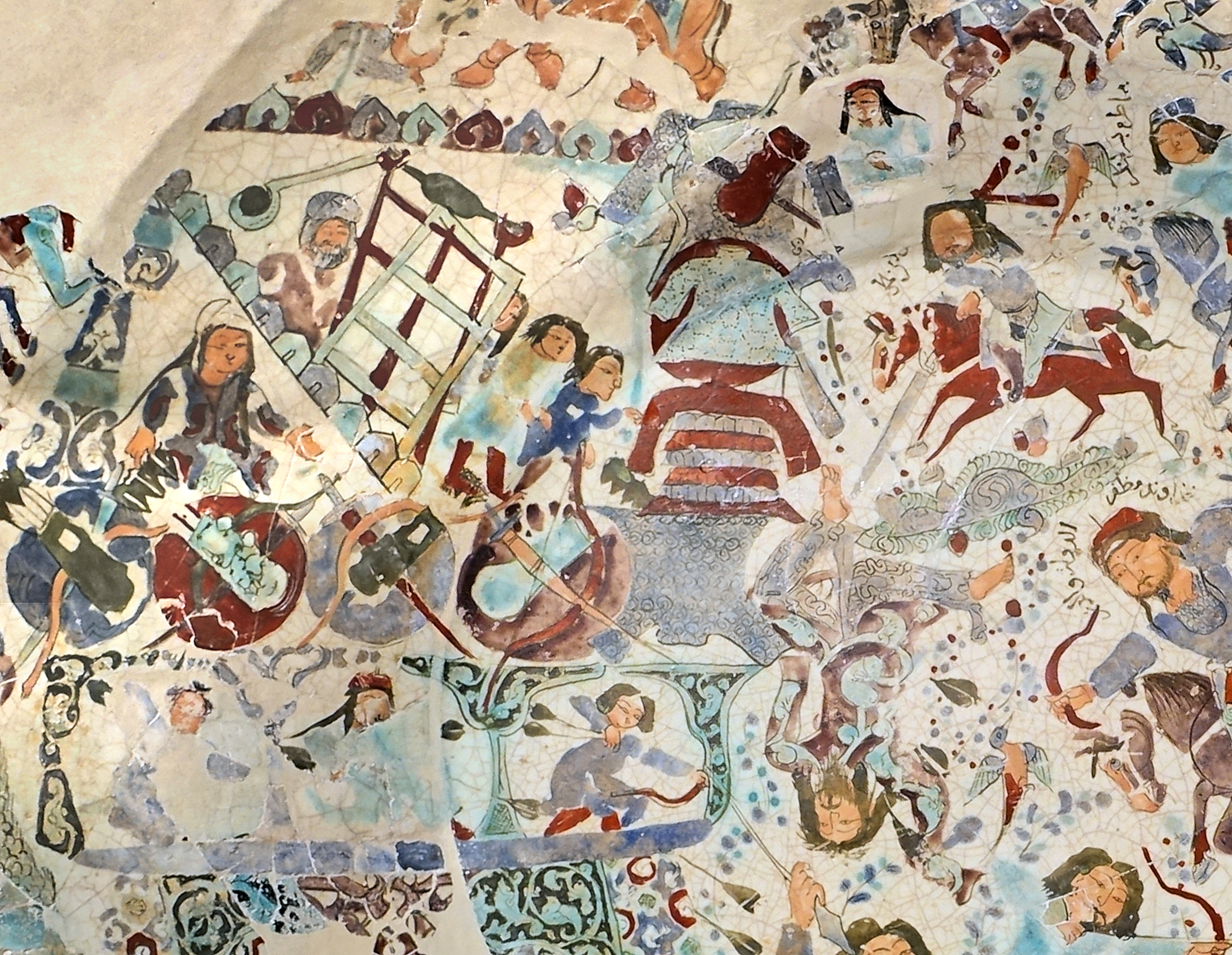
Mina'i bowl depiction of a fortress under siege, circa 1200, Iran
