= Nukus District =

Coordinates: 42°35′56″N 59°32′04″E

Nokis district Нөкис районы, Nókis rayonı
- District
- Nokis district
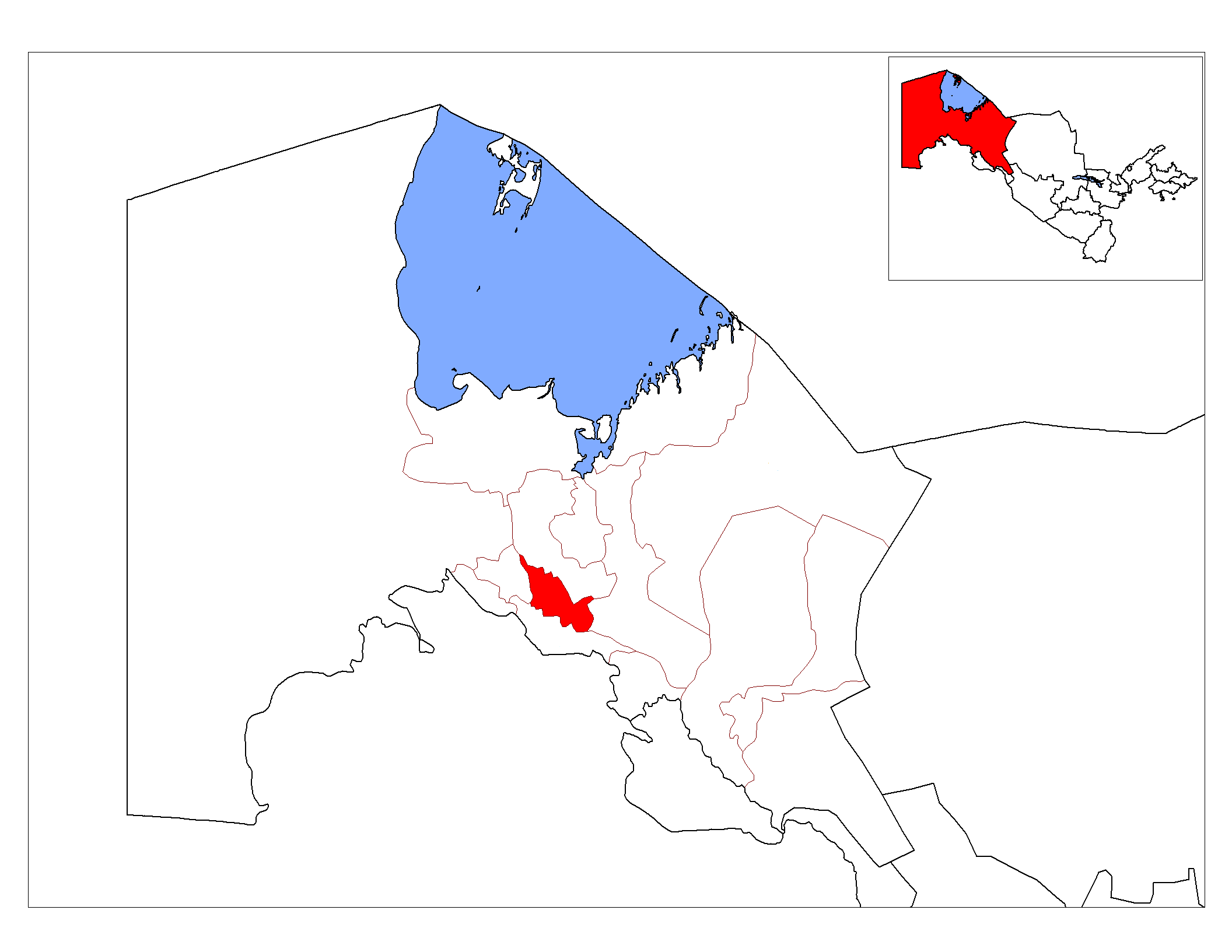
- Country: Uzbekistan
- Autonomous Republic: Karakalpakstan
- Capital: Aqmańģit

Area
  - Total: 940 km^{2} (360 sq mi)

Population (2022)
  - Total: 51,900
  - Density: 55/km^{2} (140/sq mi)
- Time zone: UTC+5 (UZT)

Nókis district or Nukus district (Karakalpak: Нөкис районы, Nókis rayonı) is a district in the Republic of Karakalpakstan. Population 41,890 (1989). The capital lies at the town Aqmańģıt. The city of Nukus is not part of the district. Its area is 940 km^{2} (360 sq mi) and it had 51,900 inhabitants in 2022.

There are one town Aqmańģıt and six rural communities Arbashi, Baqanshaqli, Kerder, Samanbay, Taqirkól, Krantau.

Largely an agricultural district, the Karakalpaktomat enterprise, active in the area uses drip irrigation methods in cotton growing. Due to this, the crop capacity reaches 70 centners per hectare, which is among the country's highest figures.
