= Bozataw =

Bozataw Бозатаў, Bozataw
- Town
- Bozataw
- Location in Uzbekistan
- Coordinates: 43°01′00″N 59°21′32″E
- Country: Uzbekistan
- Autonomous republic: Karakalpakstan
- District: Bozataw district

Population (2001)
  - Total: 5,034
- Time zone: UTC+5 (UZT)
- Postal code: 230510

Bozataw (Karakalpak: Бозатаў, Bozataw; Uzbek: Boʻzatov), formerly Kazanketken (Uzbek: Qozonketkan), is an urban-type settlement in Karakalpakstan in Uzbekistan. It is the seat of Bozataw district.
