= Guldursun-Kala =

Ancient fortress in Uzbekistan, built in the 12th century CE

- Guldursun-Kala
- Guldursun-Kala
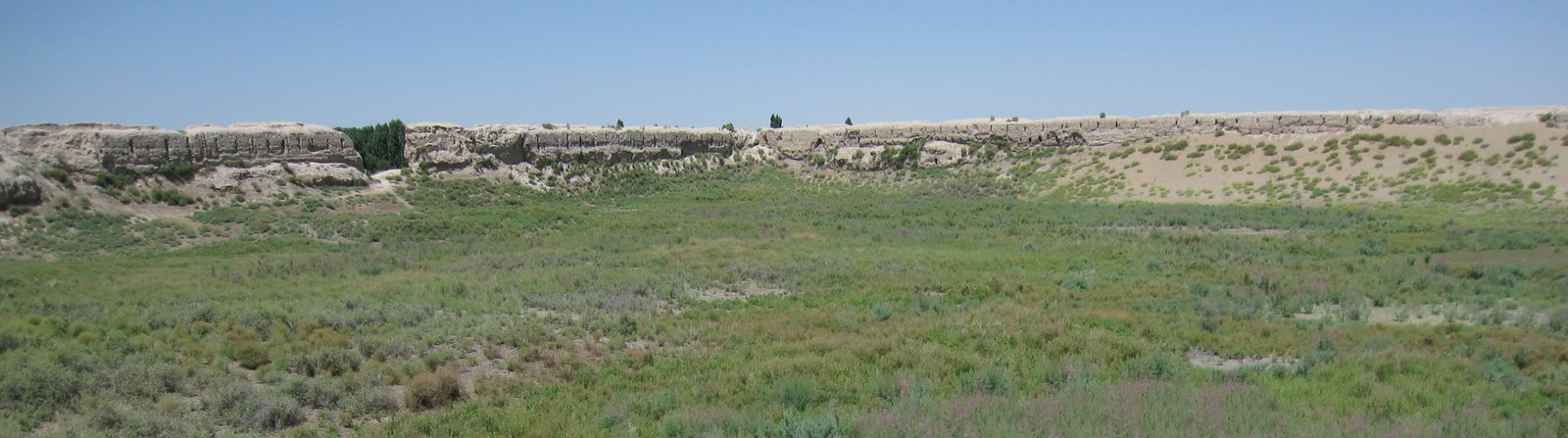
- Guldursun-Kala

- Location within West and Central Asia Location within Uzbekistan
- 41°41′35.1″N 60°58′53.4″E
- Type: Settlement
- Periods: Parthian, Sasanian
- Location: Karakalpakstan, Uzbekistan

Site notes
- Condition: Ruined

Guldursun-Kala, also Guldursun Qala, in modern Karakalpakstan, Uzbekistan, was an ancient fortress in Chorasmia built in the 12th century CE. It is one of the largest fortresses of Khwarezm, with perimeter walls of about 1 kilometer in total length, and an internal area of about 6.4 hectares (64,000 square meters, or 15.8 acres).

It is part of the "Fifty fortresses oasis" in modern-day Uzbekistan. It was last occupied by Muhammad II of Khwarazm (1169, 1200–20), before it fell to the Mongol conquest of the Khwarazmian Empire.

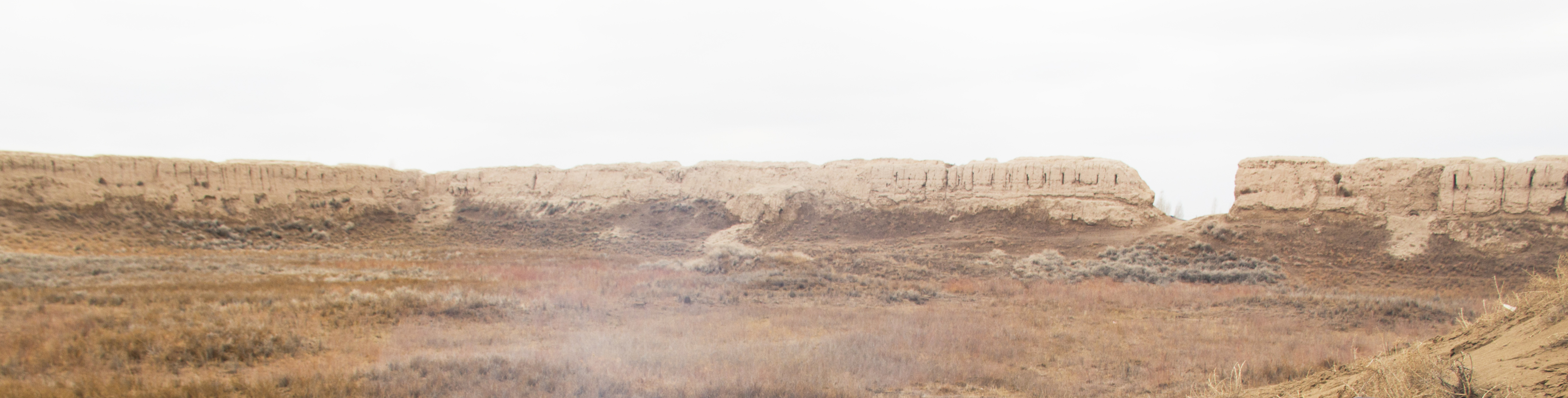
Interior panorama of Guldursun-Kala

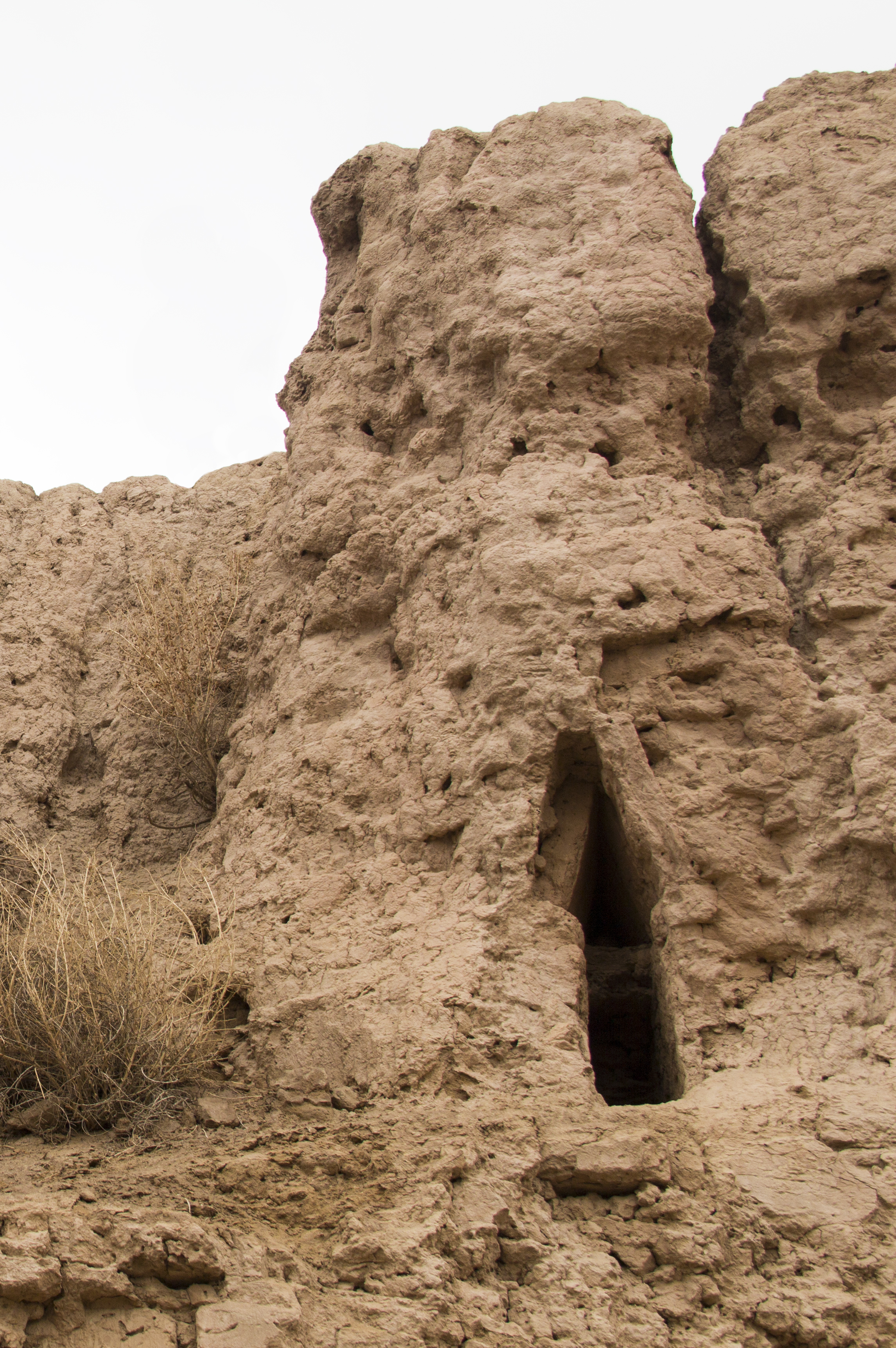
Arrow-shaped arrowslit and merlons, walls of Guldursun-Kala

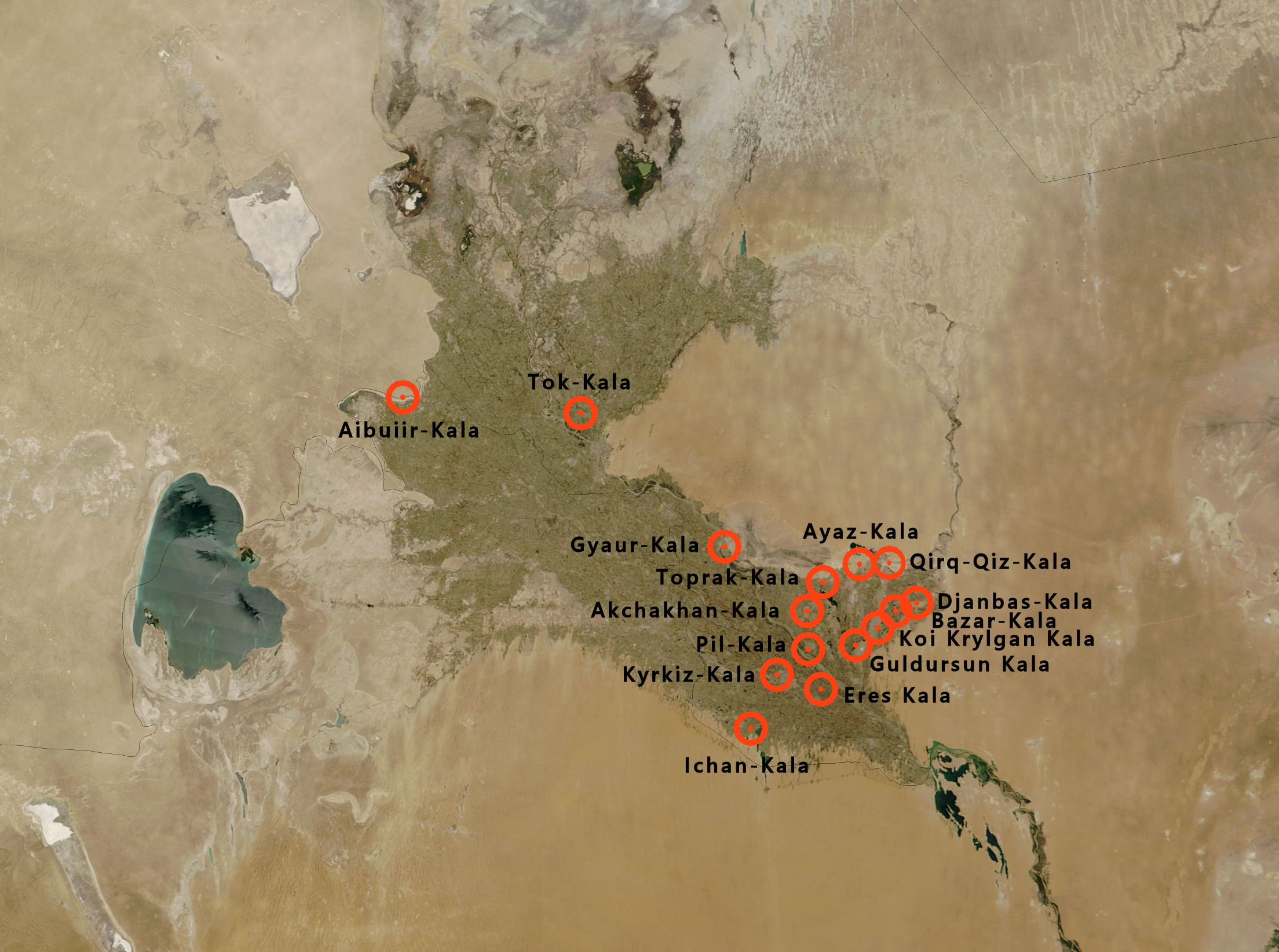
Location of the Guldursun-Kala fortress in the Chorasmian oasis, in relation to other main fortresses
