= Kegeyli =

- Town
- Location in Uzbekistan
- Coordinates: 42°46′36″N 59°36′28″E
- Country: Uzbekistan
- Autonomous Republic: Karakalpakstan
- District: Kegeyli District

Population (2016)
  - Total: 12,400
- Time zone: UTC+5 (UZT)

Kegeyli (Uzbek: Kegeyli, Karakalpak: Kegeyli, Russian: Кегейли) is a town and seat of Kegeyli District in Karakalpakstan in Uzbekistan. The town population was 10,867 people in 1989, and 12,400 in 2016.
