= Kegeyli District =

Coordinates: 42.775651°N 59.610228°E

- District
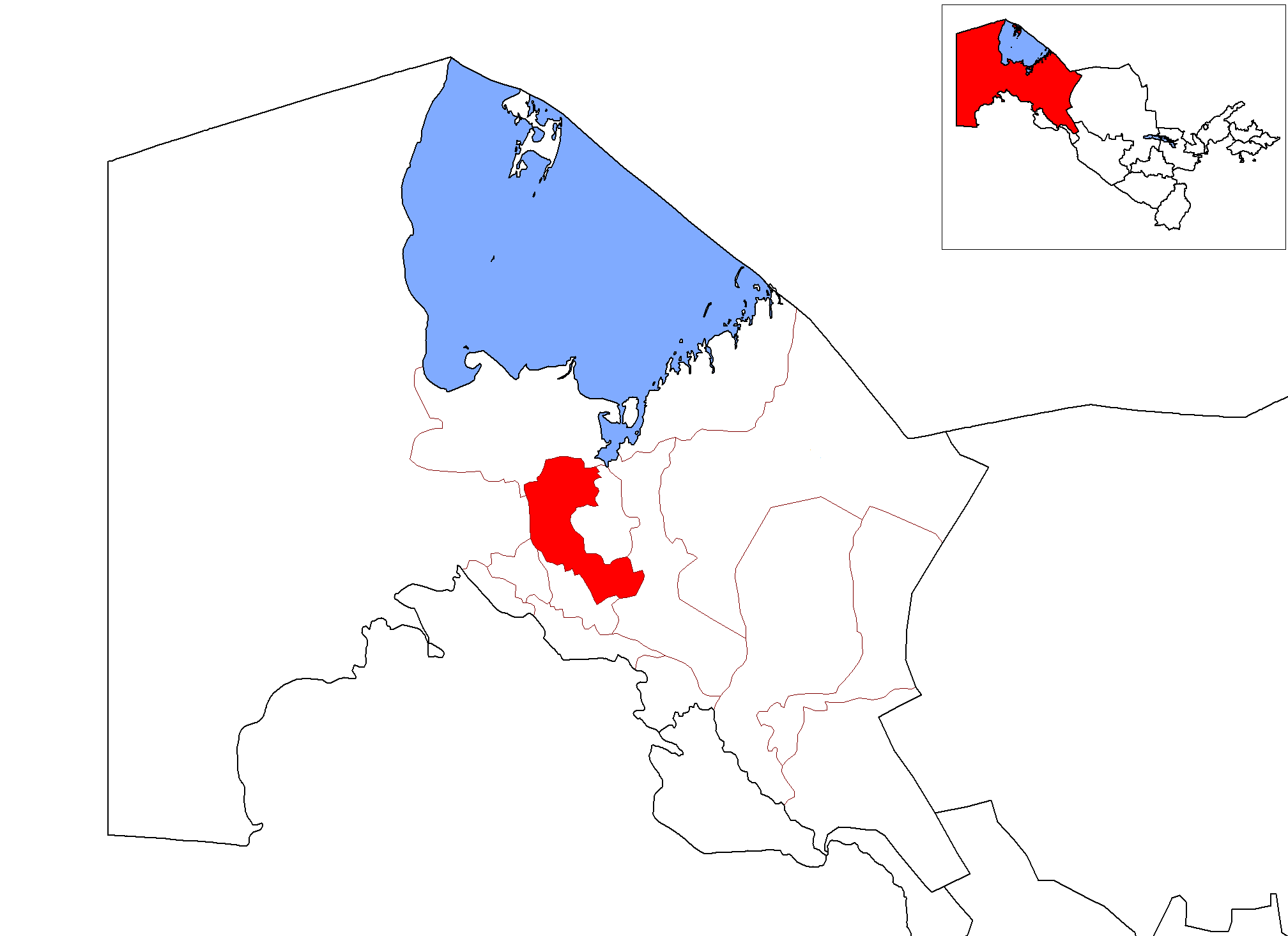
- Country: Uzbekistan
- Autonomous Republic: Karakalpakstan
- Capital: Kegeyli

Area
  - Total: 920 km^{2} (360 sq mi)

Population (2022)
  - Total: 73,600
  - Density: 80/km^{2} (210/sq mi)
- Time zone: UTC+5 (UZT)

Kegeyli district (Karakalpak: Кегейли районы) is a district of Karakalpakstan in Uzbekistan. The capital lies at the town Kegeyli. Its area is 920 km^{2} (360 sq mi) and it had 73,600 inhabitants in 2022.

== Etymology ==
The origin of Kegeyli is associated with the Kegeyli canal, which flows through the town itself and through the district of Kegeyli also. Both sides of this canal are called Kegeyli because they were surrounded by kegay trees and turquoise. This was later generalized to the town.

== History ==
Kegeyli district was created in 2004 by the merger of former Bozataw district and former Kegeyli district. This merger was effected by Resolution 598-II of the Oliy Majlis of the Republic of Uzbekistan (11 February 2004) and Resolution 225 of the Cabinet of Ministers of the Republic of Uzbekistan (11 May 2004), which abolished Bozataw district and created the enlarged Kegeyli district. In 2019 it lost part of its territory to the re-established Bozataw district.

== Locations ==
As of 2021, the district contains one city Xalıqabat, one town Kegeyli and eight rural communities Abat, Aktuba, Jańabazar, Jalpaq jap, Kók Ozek, Kumshunkól, Júzim baģ, Iyshan kala.

== Population ==
Most of the population is Karakalpak, but there are also Uzbeks, Kazakhs, Tatars, Koreans, Russians and others. In average there are 62 people per km^{2}. The urban population is 33,800 as of 2000.

== Economy ==
In shirkat farms, mainly cotton is cultivated. About 18,000 pieces of cattle, 18,000 sheep and 10 camels are fed in district and private farms.
