= Qaraózek district =

Coordinates: 43.026°N 60.015°E

Qaraózek district Қараөзек районы, Qaraózek rayonı
- District
- Qaraózek district
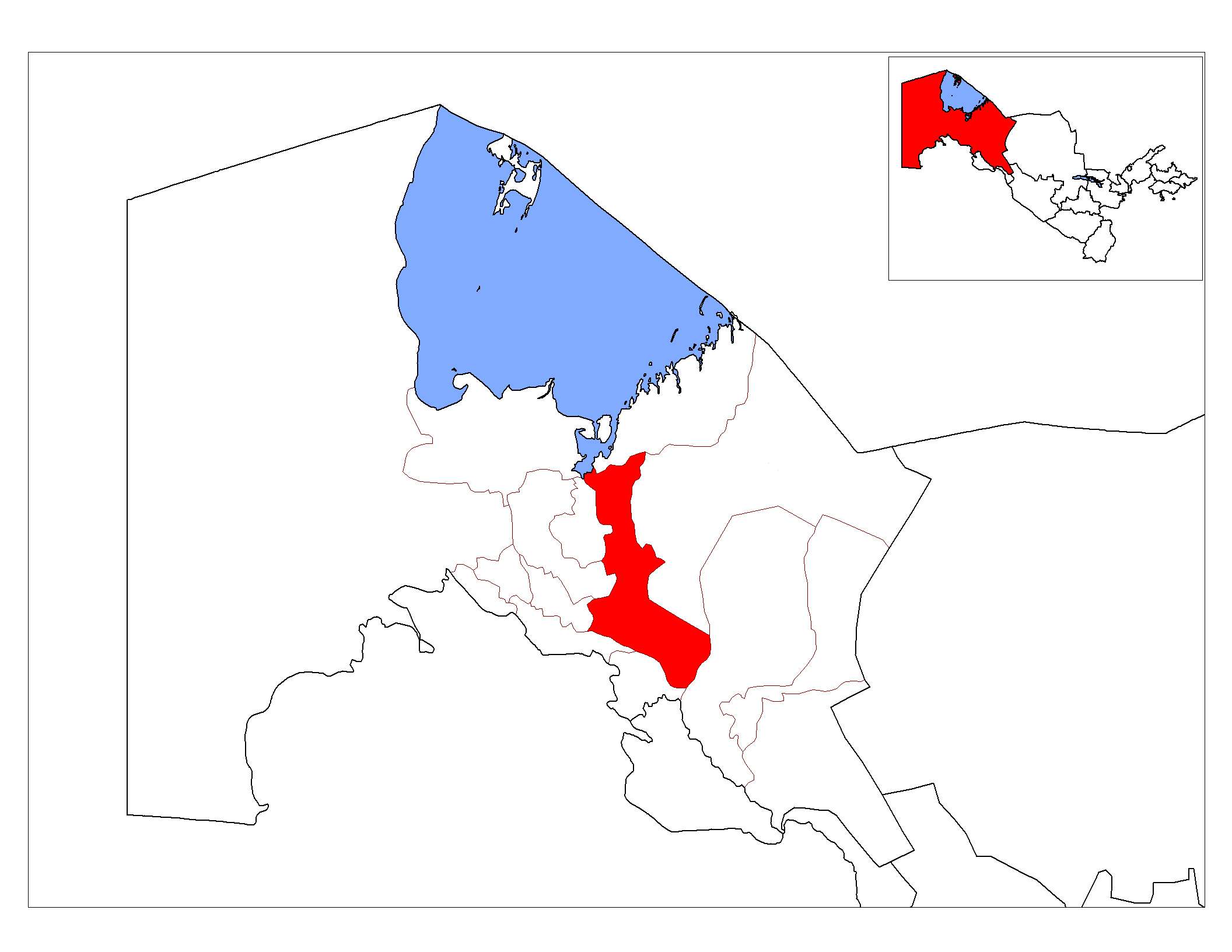
- Country: Uzbekistan
- Autonomous Republic: Karakalpakstan
- Capital: Qaraózek

Area
  - Total: 5,890 km^{2} (2,270 sq mi)

Population (2022)
  - Total: 53,600
  - Density: 9.10/km^{2} (23.6/sq mi)
- Time zone: UTC+5 (UZT)

Qaraózek district (Karakalpak: Қараөзек районы, Qaraózek rayonı) is a district of the Republic of Karakalpakstan in Uzbekistan. The capital lies at the town Qaraózek. Its area is 5,890 km^{2} (2,270 sq mi) and it had 53,600 inhabitants in 2022.

The district contains one town Qaraózek and eight village councils Mádeniyat, Berdaq, Esımuzaq, Alģabas, Qarabuģa, Qarakól, Qaraózek, Qoybaģ.
