= Xalıqabat =

Xalıqabat Халықабат, Xalıqabat
- City
- Xalıqabat
- Location in Uzbekistan
- Coordinates: 42°41′00″N 59°43′30″E
- Country: Uzbekistan
- Autonomous Republic: Karakalpakstan
- District: Kegeyli District

Population (2016)
  - Total: 14,600
- Time zone: UTC+5 (UZT)

Xaliqabat (Karakalpak: Халықабат, Xalıqabat) is a city (qala) of Kegeyli District in Karakalpakstan in Uzbekistan. Its population was 9,186 in 1989, and 14,600 in 2016.
