= Shımbay district =

Coordinates: 42°55′48″N 59°46′12″E

Shimbay district Шымбай районы, Shımbay rayonı
- District
- Shimbay district
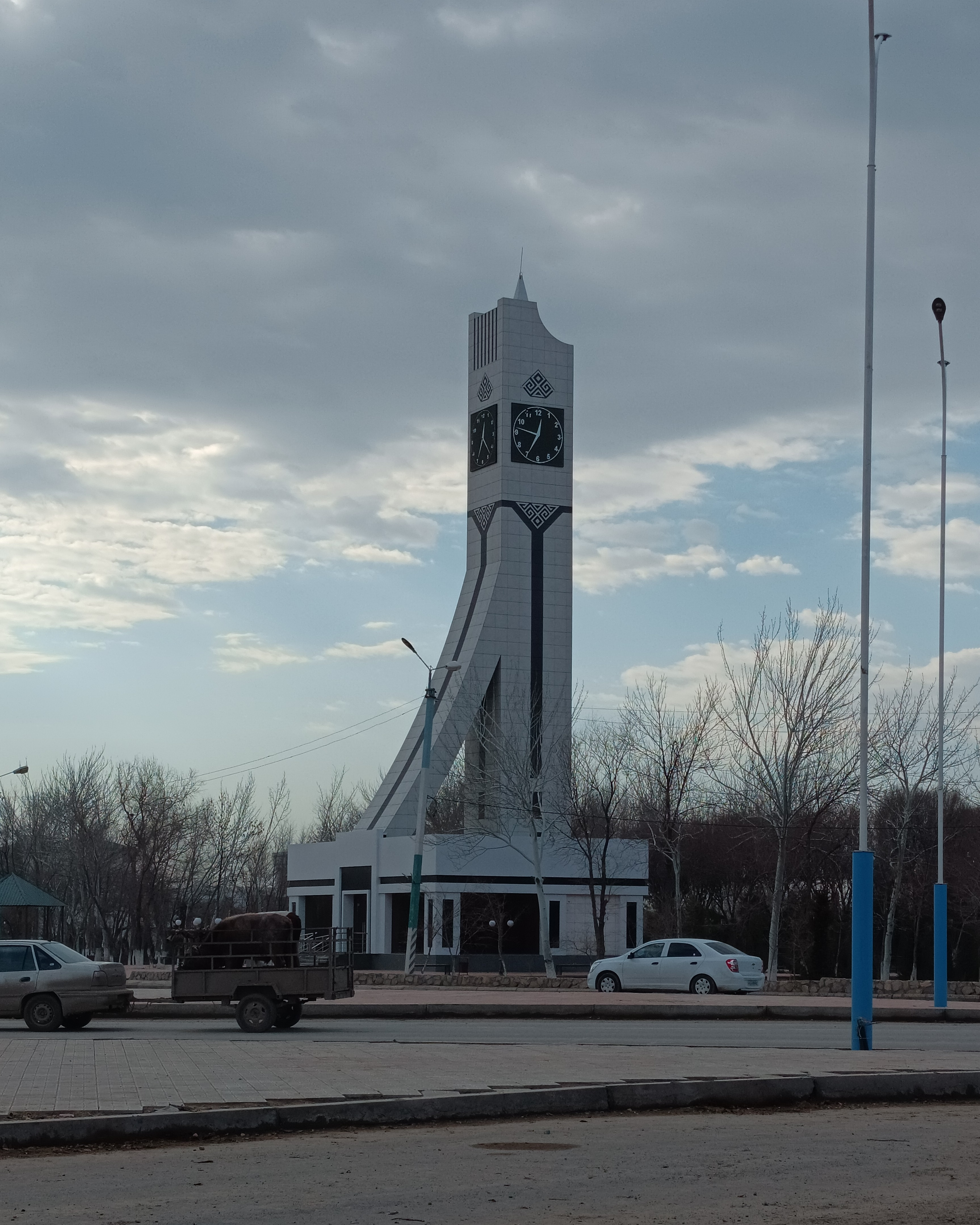
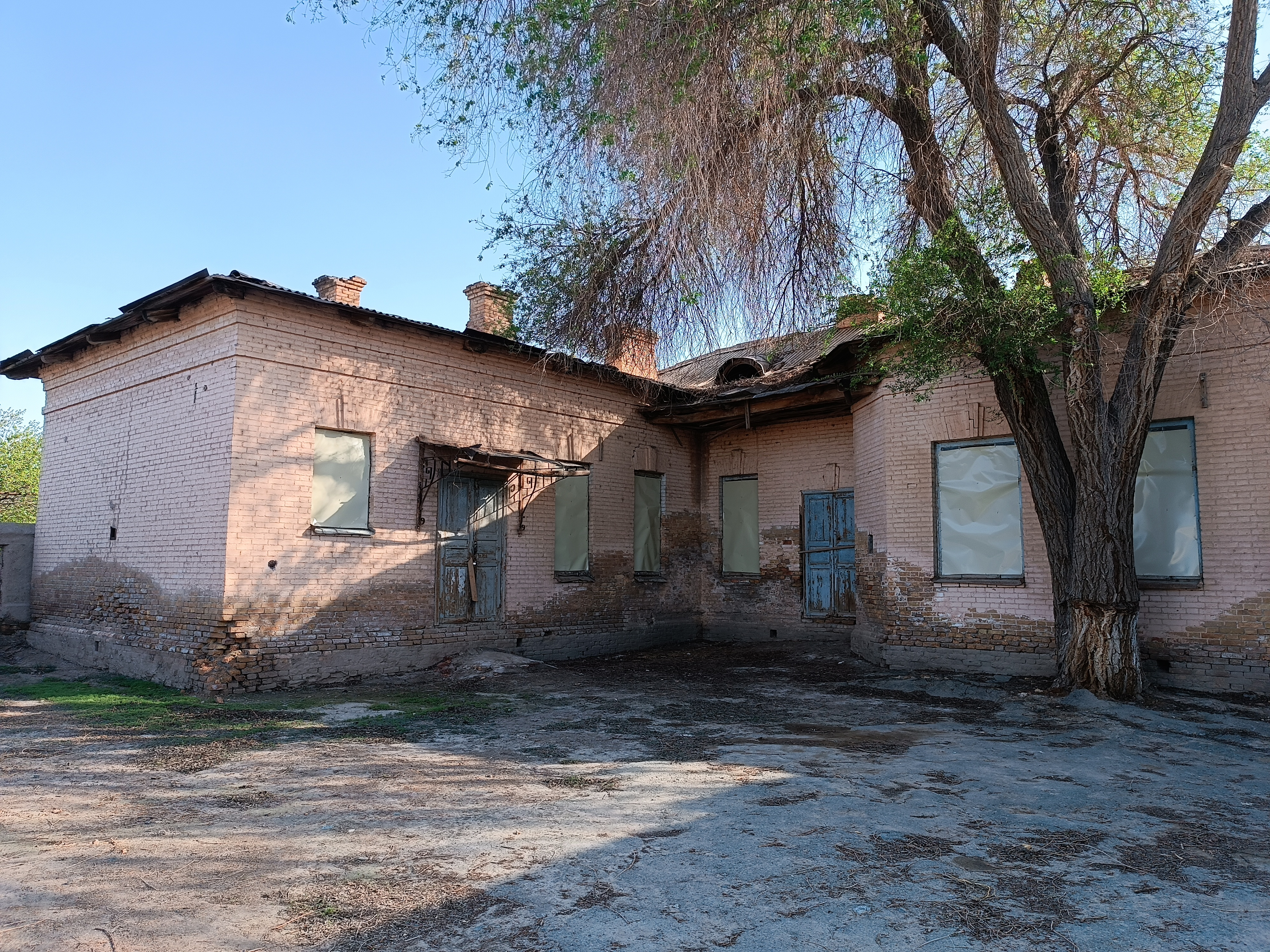
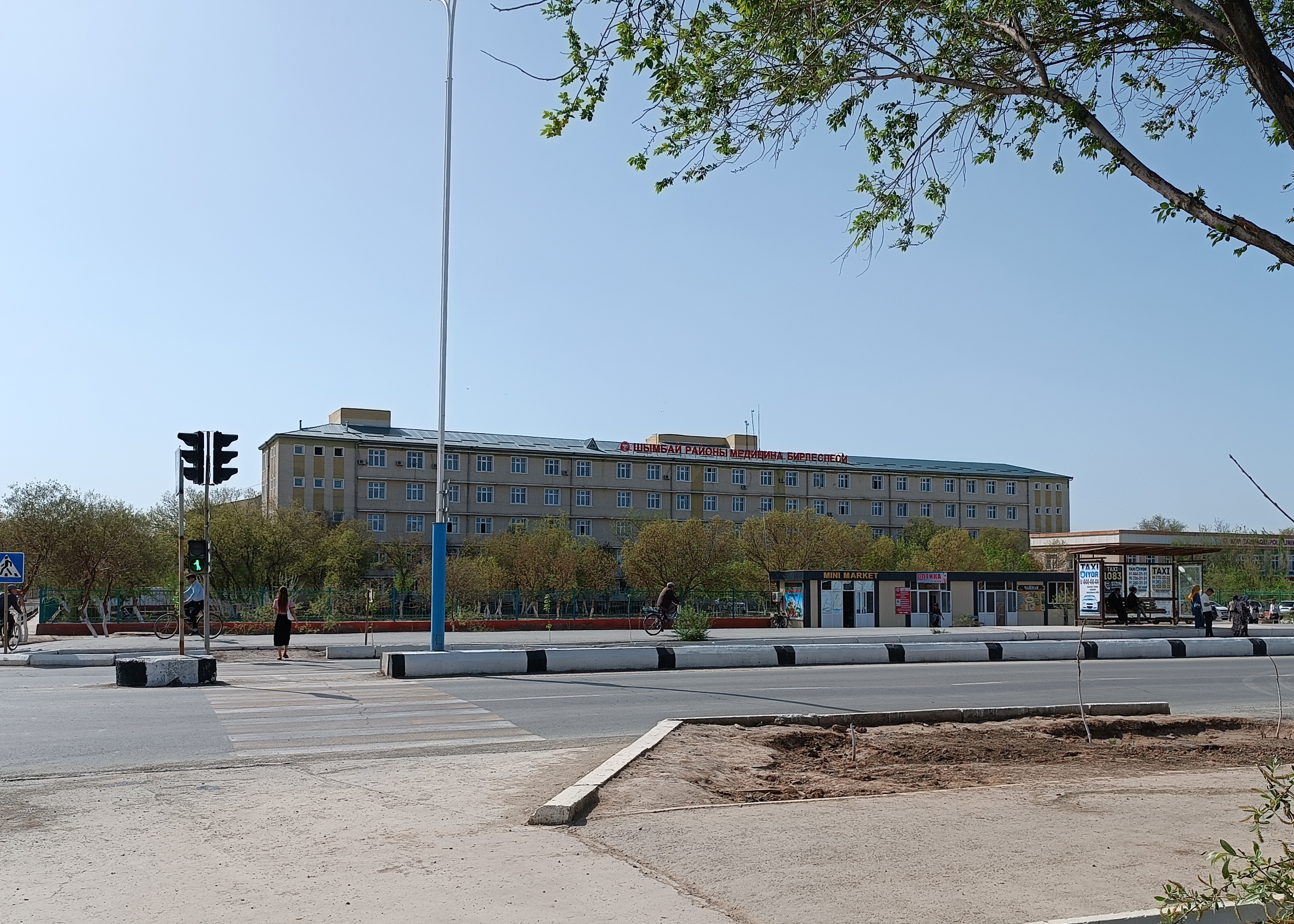

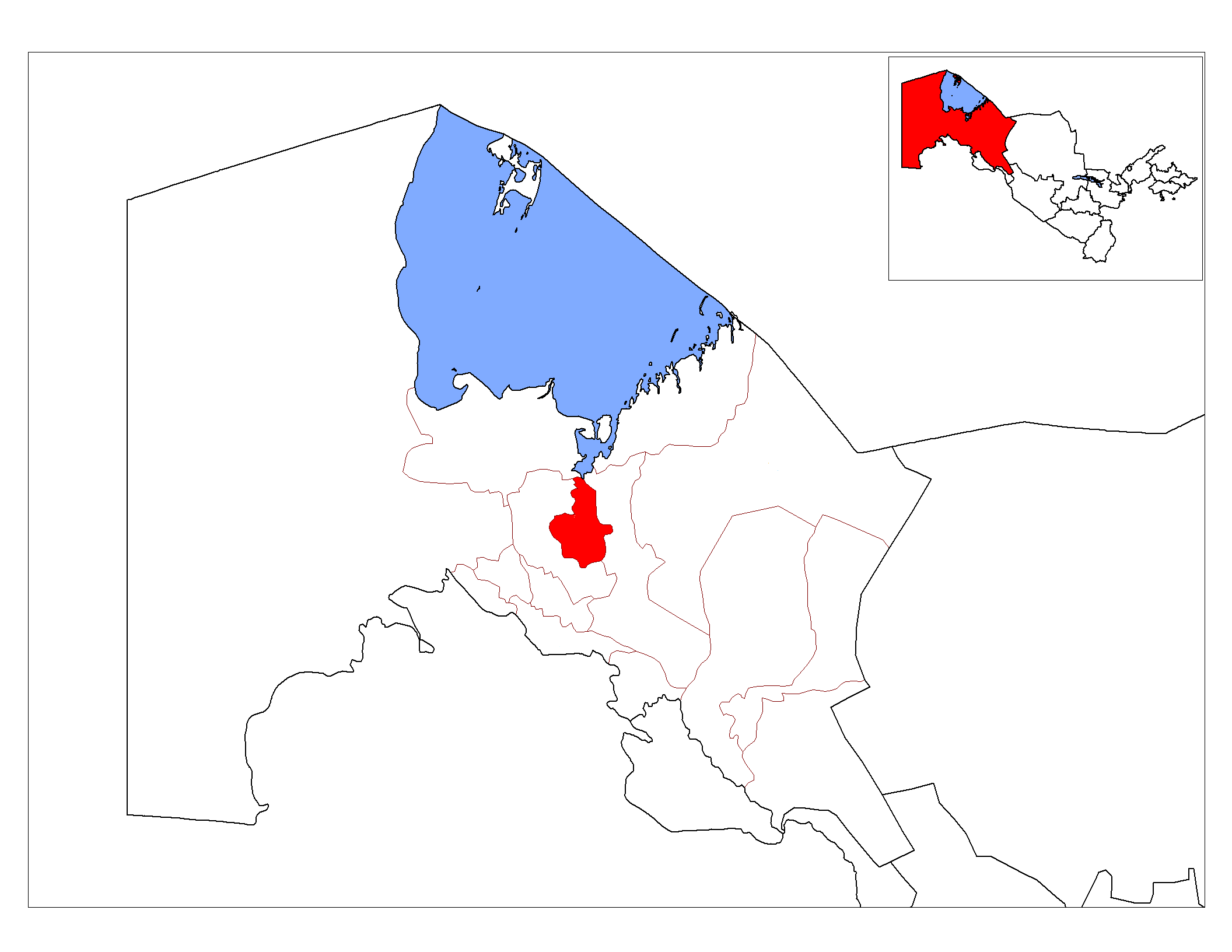
- Country: Uzbekistan
- Autonomous Republic: Karakalpakstan
- Capital: Shimbay

Area
  - Total: 1,440 km^{2} (560 sq mi)

Population (2022)
  - Total: 114,000
  - Density: 79.2/km^{2} (205/sq mi)
- Time zone: UTC+5 (UZT)

Shimbay district (Karakalpak: Шымбай районы, Shımbay rayonı) is a district of the Republic of Karakalpakstan. The capital lies at the city Shimbay. In 2019, part of its territory was given to the re-established Bozataw district. Its area is 1,440 km^{2} (560 sq mi) and it had 114,000 inhabitants in 2022.

Shimbay district contains one city Shimbay, one town Áyteke and ten rural communities.
