= Taxtakópir =

Urban-type settlement in Karakalpakstan, Uzbekistan

Taxtakópir Тахтакөпир, Taxtakópir
- Town
- Taxtakópir
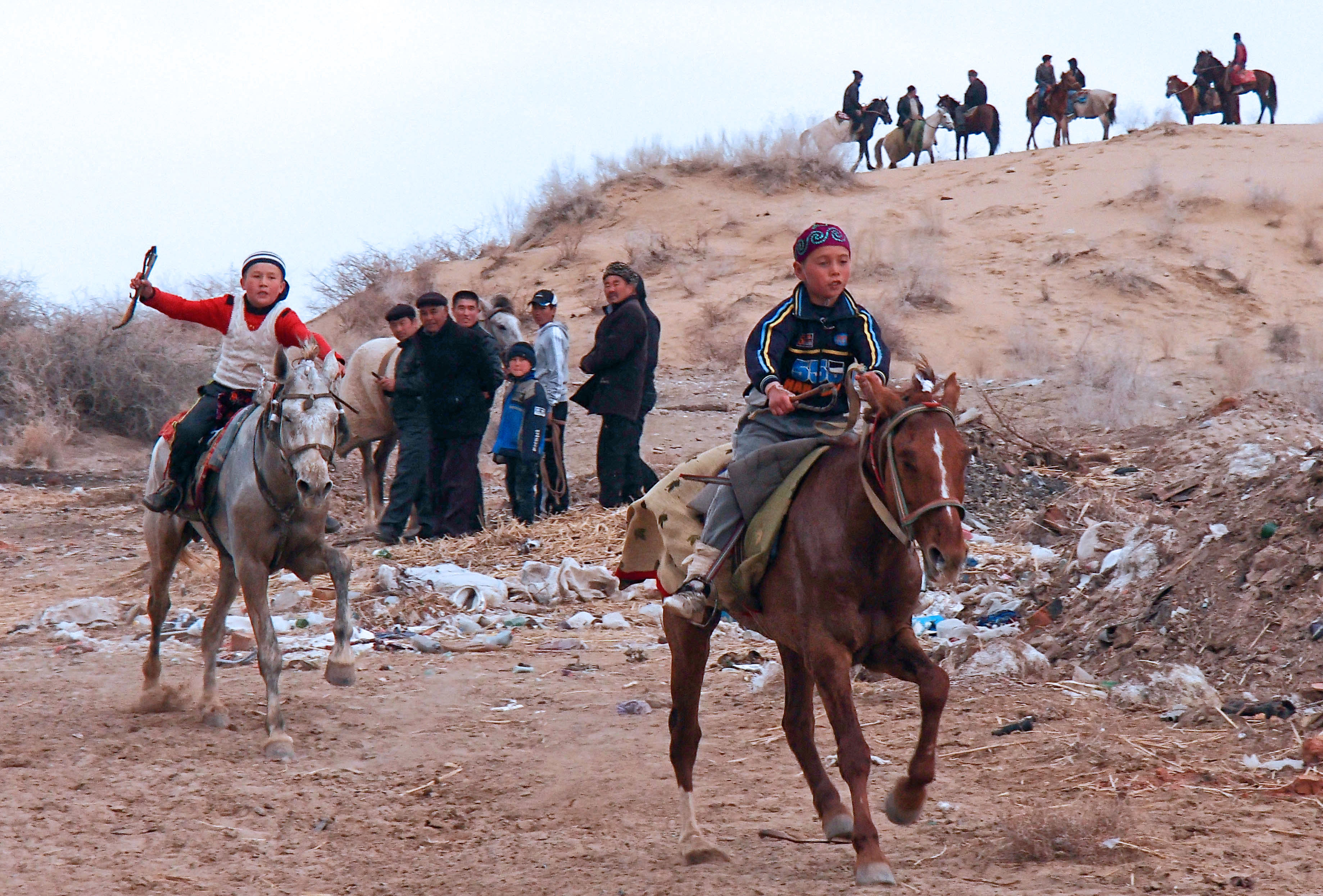
- Karakalpak boys race in Taxtako‘pir

- Location in Uzbekistan
- Coordinates: 43°01′21″N 60°17′19″E
- Country: Uzbekistan
- Autonomous Republic: Karakalpakstan
- District: Taxtakópir district
- Elevation: 61 m (200 ft)

Population (2004)
  - Total: 17,100
- Time zone: UTC+5 (UZT)
- Postal code: 231100

Taxtakópir (Karakalpak: Тахтакөпир, lit. 'wooden bridge') is an urban-type settlement and seat of the Taxtakópir district in Karakalpakstan in Uzbekistan. It is 107 kilometres (66 mi) from the Karakalpak capital of Nukus.

The town has been the seat of Taxtakópir district since 1984. It has six public schools and two vocational colleges.

In 1989, during the last Soviet census, the population was recorded as 15,022 (7,553 men and 7,469 women). The population in 2004 was 17,100.
