= Karakalpaks =

Kipchak ethnic group of northwestern Uzbekistan

Qaraqalpaqlar, Қарақалпақлар, قاراقلپقلر
- Flag of Karakalpakstan

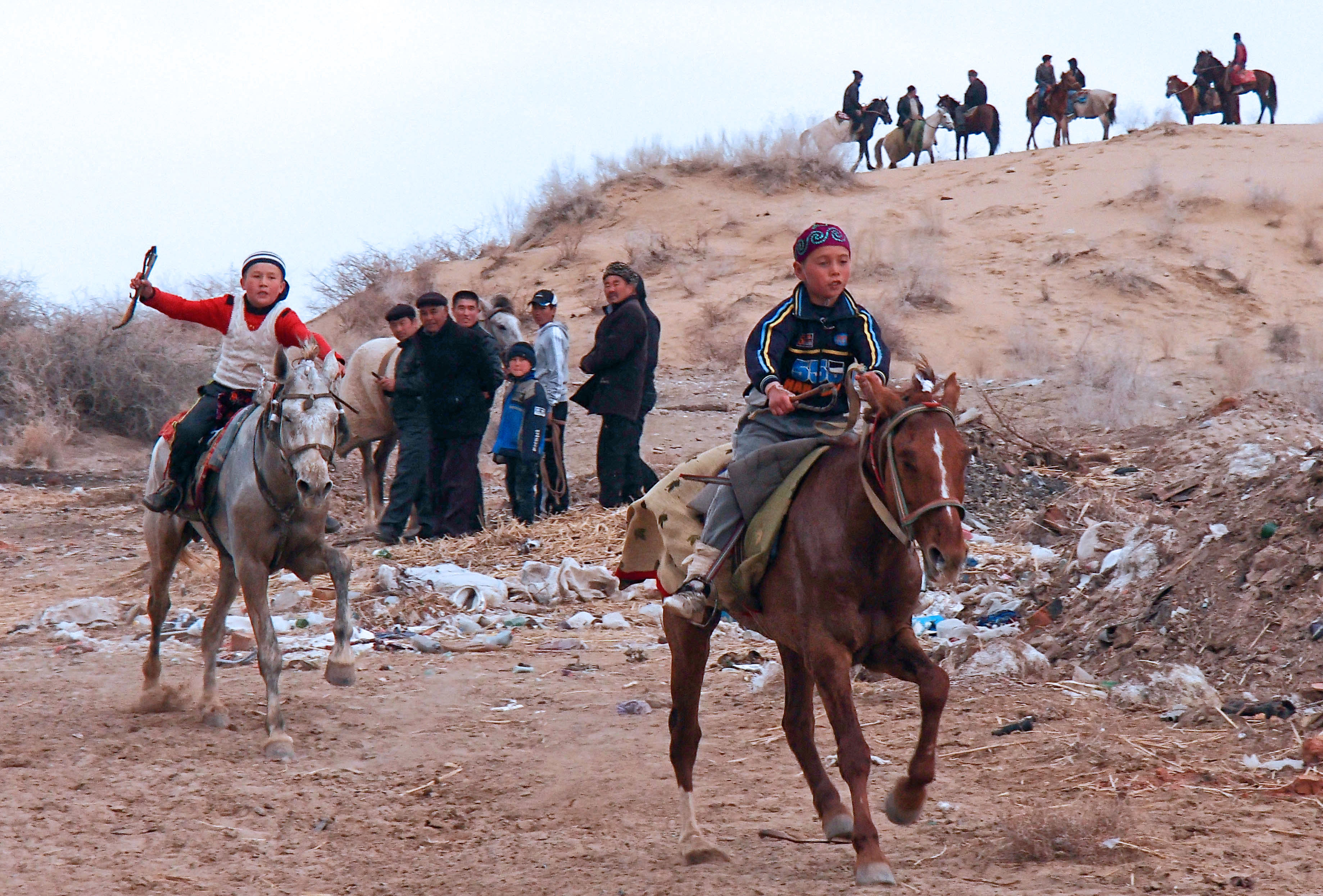
- Karakalpak boys race in Taxtako‘pir

Total population
- 871,970 - 934,700

Regions with significant populations
- Uzbekistan Karakalpakstan: 841,397 772,340 (2026 census)
- Kazakhstan: 28,931 (2025 est.)
- Russia: 14 660 (2020)
- Turkmenistan: 2,371 (2022 census)
- Kyrgyzstan: 1,200
- Ukraine: 117

Languages
- Karakalpak, Russian, Uzbek

Religion
- Sunni Islam

Related ethnic groups
- Kazakh; Kyrgyz; Nogai

The Karakalpaks, or Qaraqalpaqs (/ˈkærəkɑːlpɑːks, -pæks/; Karakalpak: Qaraqalpaqlar, Қарақалпақлар, قاراقلپقلر), are a Turkic ethnic group native to Karakalpakstan in Northwestern Uzbekistan. During the 18th century, they settled in the lower reaches of the Amu Darya and in the (former) delta of Amu Darya on the southern shore of the Aral Sea. The name Karakalpak comes from two words: qara meaning 'black' and qalpaq meaning 'hat'. The Karakalpaks number about 900,000 worldwide, out of which more than 770,000 live in the Karakalpakstan region of Uzbekistan.

== Etymology ==
The word Karakalpak is derived from the Russian Cyrillic spelling of their name and has become the accepted name for these people in the West. The Karakalpaks endonymically refer to themselves as Qaraqalpaqs, while the Uzbeks call them Qoraqalpoqs. The word means "black kalpak" and has caused much confusion in the past, since historians linked them with other earlier peoples (such as Cherniye Klobuki), who have borne the appellation "black hat" in Slavic vernacular.

== History ==
Many accounts continue to link the present-day Karakalpaks with the Turkic confederation known as the Cherniye Klobuki of the 11th century, whose name also means "black hat" in Russian. Cherniye Klobuki were mercenary military troops of the Kievan Rus. Apart from the fact that their names have the same meaning, there is no archaeological or historical evidence to link these two groups.

The Karakalpaks, Uzbeks, and Kazakhs are regarded to be subgroups of the same Uzbek Confederation that arose in the fifteenth century following the breakdown of Genghis Khan's empire and the collapse of the Golden Horde. According to the Russian Orientalist Pavel Ivanov, documents from the reign of Abdullah Khan (1583-1598 CE) in Bukhara mention the Karakalpaks among the peoples living near Sighnaq, along the lower reaches of the Syr Darya in mondern-day Kazakhstan. Other sources state the Karakalpak group was formed in the seventeenth century as a result of a split from the Kazakh confederation.

Recent archaeological evidence indicates that the Karakalpaks may have formed as a confederation of different tribes at some time in the late 15th or the 16th centuries at some location along the Syr Darya or its southern Zhany Darya outlet, in proximity to the Kazakhs of the Lesser Horde. This would explain why their language, customs, and material culture are so similar to that of the Kazakhs.

== Geography ==
The Karakalpak population is mainly confined to the central part of Karakalpakstan that is irrigated by the Amu Darya. The largest communities live in Nukus, the capital of Karakalpakstan and the surrounding large towns, such as Khodjeyli, Shimbay, Takhiatash, Shomanay and Kungrad. Although their homeland bears their name, the Karakalpaks are not the largest ethnic group living in Karakalpakstan. They are increasingly being outnumbered by Uzbeks, many of whom are being encouraged to move into the rich agricultural region around Turtkul and Beruniy.

Rural Karakalpaks mainly live on former collective or state farms, most of which have been recently privatised. Many rural Karakalpaks have been seriously affected by the desiccation of the Aral Sea, which has destroyed the local fishing industry along with much of the grazing and agricultural land in the north of the delta. The majority of Karakalpakstan is occupied by desert: the Kyzyl Kum on the eastern side, the barren Ustyurt Plateau to the west and now the growing Aralkum to the north, once the bed of the former Aral Sea.

== Language ==
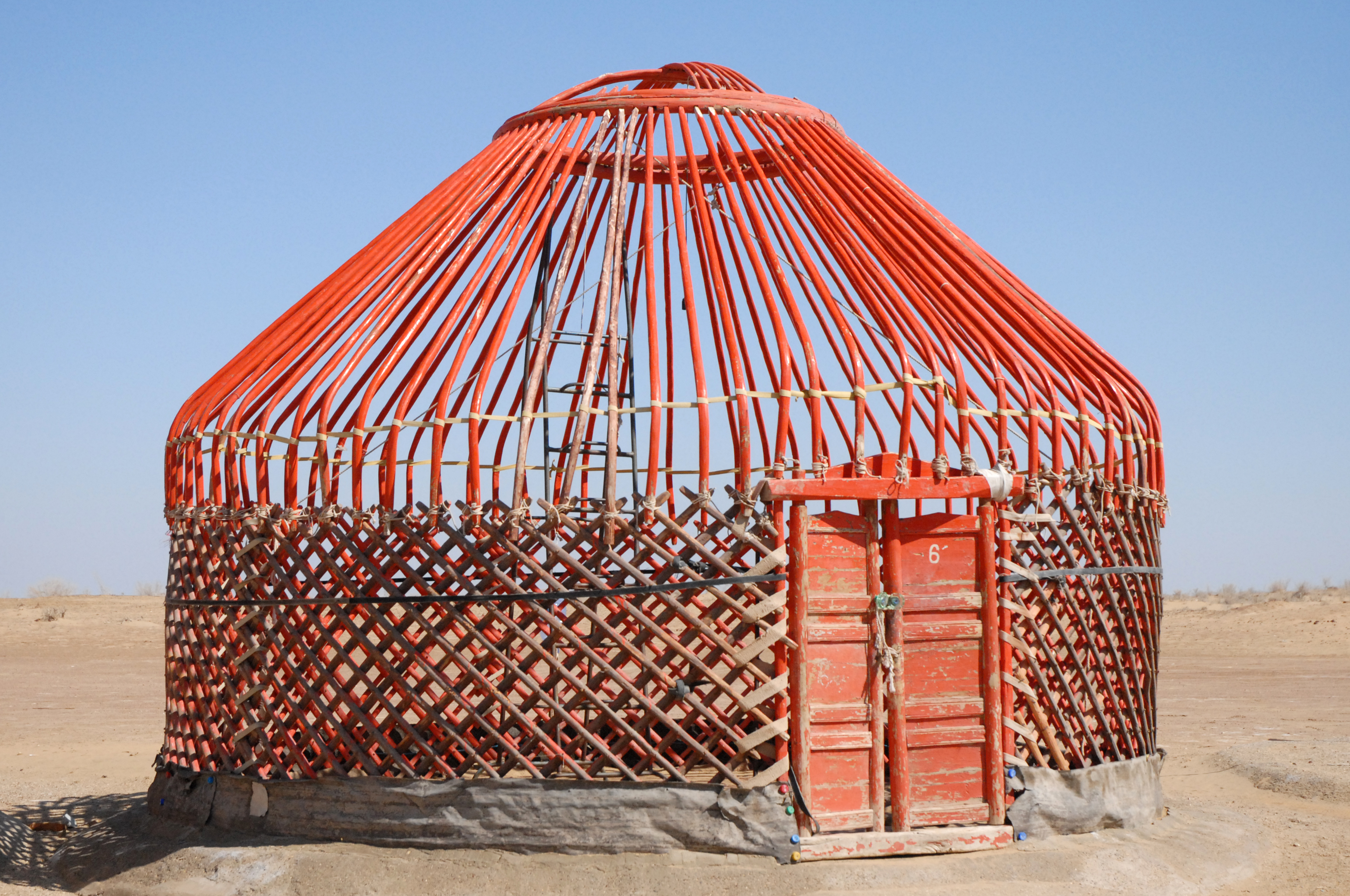
A frame of traditional Karakalpak yurt or qara úy

The Karakalpak language belongs to the Kipchak–Nogai group of Turkic languages, which also includes Kazakh and Nogai. Spoken Karakalpak has two dialects: Northeastern and Southwestern. Written Karakalpak uses both a modified form of the Cyrillic alphabet and Latin alphabet, with the former being standard during the Soviet Union and the latter modelled on Uzbekistan's alphabet reform for Uzbek. Before the Soviet Union, Karakalpak was rarely written, but when it was it used a modified form of the Perso-Arabic alphabet.

Due to the geography and history of the Karakalpak people, Karakalpak has been influenced by Uzbek, Mongol, Tajik and Russian. A Karakalpak-Uzbek pidgin language is often spoken by those bilingual in both languages.

== Religion ==
Karakalpaks are primarily followers of the Hanafi School of Sunni Islam. It is probable they adopted Islam between the 10th and 13th centuries, a period when they first appeared as a distinct ethnic group.

Dervish orders such as the Naqshbandi, Kubrawiya, Yasawi and Qalandari are fairly common in the region. The religious order that established the strongest relationship with the people of the region is the Kubrawiya, which has Shi'i adherents.

Of 553 mosques recorded in 1914, a few remain in Nókis, Tórtkúl, Xojeli, and Shımbay. Many Karakalpak mullahs use their homes for Friday prayers.

== Literature ==
Since ancient times, among the Karakalpaks, legends and traditions have been told and passed down from generation to generation about the origin of the tribes and peoples who inhabited Khorezm, about Kayumars, Jamshid, Siyavush, Rustam, Tomiris, Iskander (Alexander the Great), about the female kingdom, Mount Tok, Genghis Khan, Guldursun, Dede Korkut. Legends that are very popular among the Karakalpaks include the legends about Ayaz-Kala (Ayaz fortress), Guldursun, the fortress of the Forty Girls (Karakalpian: Qırq-qız-kale), Mount Tok (Karakalpian: Toq-taw).

The history of Karakalpak national literature begins with the formation of the Karakalpaks as a people from the 2nd half. XVI century, from the time they were mentioned in historical chronicles under the name "Karakalpaks". Appeared in the XIV-XV centuries. and in the 1st half. XVI century in the Golden Horde, White Horde and the Great Nogai Union, literary monuments and the work of the poets who lived in those times should be considered common to the modern Kazakh, Nogai and Karakalpak peoples. Songs composed in the XIV-XVI centuries. in the Nogai Union, scientists called them "Nogai songs". The same name is also used by Shoqan Valikhanov, who divides the heritage created by the people into 3 groups and calls the 3rd group "Nogai songs", indicating the time of their appearance – the XIV-XVI centuries. – and noting their commonality for the Kazakh, Karakalpak, Kyrgyz, Nogai peoples.

In the political development of the Karakalpaks, the 18th century was the most difficult and tragic time. Many Kazakh clans were subject to the Kalmyks. Many Karakalpaks were forced to flee to the lower reaches of the Syr Darya. Since 1810, the historical fate of the Karakalpaks has been closely connected with the history of the Khiva Khanate. The poor were hired as farm laborers by the rich and by officials, which testified to the strengthening of class stratification and contradictions between the Karakalpaks. In the 18th century Along with rich oral folk art, a literary heritage itself arose, which had specific creative features, the authors of which were known. These include the zhyrau-storyteller Zhien zhyrau (Karakalp. Jiyen jıraw). There were other poets in that era, but neither their names nor the works they created have survived to our time. Poems differ from folklore in certain ways in terms of theme, style, realism and are in the nature of written literature.

The awakened class consciousness became for those who lived in the 19th century, with classical poets as a determining factor. It formed the ideological essence of the works of such major representatives of Karakalpak classical poetry of the 19th century as Ajiniyaz, Berdakh. They wrote about the hard life and struggle of the people, their dissatisfaction with the feudal order. Satire also developed. The anecdotes Joker Omirbek, a defender of the poor and a wit, a follower of Khoja Nasreddin, were actively retold. The annexation of Karakalpakstan to Russia did not free its population from exploitation and oppression.
