= Karakalpakstan =

Coordinates: 43.04°N 58.86°E

Republic of Karakalpakstan Qaraqalpaqstan Respublikası / Қарақалпақстан Республикасы (Karakalpak) Qoraqalpoğiston Respublikasi / Қорақалпоғистон Республикаси (Uzbek)
- Autonomous republic
- Flag Emblem
- Anthem: Qaraqalpaqstan Respublikasınıń Mámleketlik Gimni (Karakalpak); Qoraqalpog‘iston Respublikasining Davlat Madhiyasi (Uzbek) "State Anthem of the Republic of Karakalpakstan"
- Karakalpakstan within Uzbekistan
- Sovereign state: Uzbekistan
- Karakalpak Autonomous Oblast: 1925
- Karakalpak Autonomous Soviet Socialist Republic: 1932
- Sovereignty declared: 14 December 1990
- Renamed as the Republic of Karakalpakstan: 21 December 1991
- Constitution adopted; End of de facto independence: 9 April 1993
- Capital and largest city: Nukus
- Official languages: Karakalpak; Uzbek
- Ethnic groups (2026): 47.6% Uzbeks; 35.9% Karakalpaks; 11.0% Kazakhs; 4.8% Turkmens; 0.6% others
- Government: Autonomous republic
  - Chairman of the Supreme Council: Amanbai Orynbaev
- Legislature: Supreme Council of Karakalpakstan

Area
  - Total: 166,590 km^{2} (64,320 sq mi)

Population
  - 2026 census: 2,149,932
  - Density: 12.9/km^{2} (33.4/sq mi)
- GDP (PPP): 2026 estimate
  - Total: $19,3 billion
- GDP (nominal): 2026 estimate
  - Total: $5,08 billion
- HDI (2025): 0.745 high
- Currency: Uzbek sum (UZS)
- Time zone: UTC+5:00 (Uzbekistan Standard Time)
- ISO 3166 code: UZ-QR

Karakalpakstan, (Note: Karakalpak: Qaraqalpaqistan / Қарақалпақстан; Uzbek: Qoraqalpogʻiston / Қорақалпоғистон) officially the Republic of Karakalpakstan, (Note: Karakalpak: Qaraqalpaqstan Respublikası / Қарақалпақстан Республикасы; Uzbek: Qoraqalpogʻiston Respublikasi / Қорақалпоғистон Республикаси) is an autonomous republic of Uzbekistan. It spans the northwestern portion of Uzbekistan. Its capital is Nukus (Nókis / Нөкис). Karakalpakstan has an area of 166,590 km^{2} (64,320 sq mi), and has a population of about 2 million people. Its territory covers the classical land of Khwarazm, which in classical Persian literature was known as Kāt (کات).

== Name ==
The name Karakalpakstan means "land of the Karakalpaks". Although Karakalpakstan contractually joined Uzbekistan in 1993 after the dissolution of the Soviet Union, Karakalpak culture and language are closer to those of the Kazakhs and Nogais.

== Archaeology ==
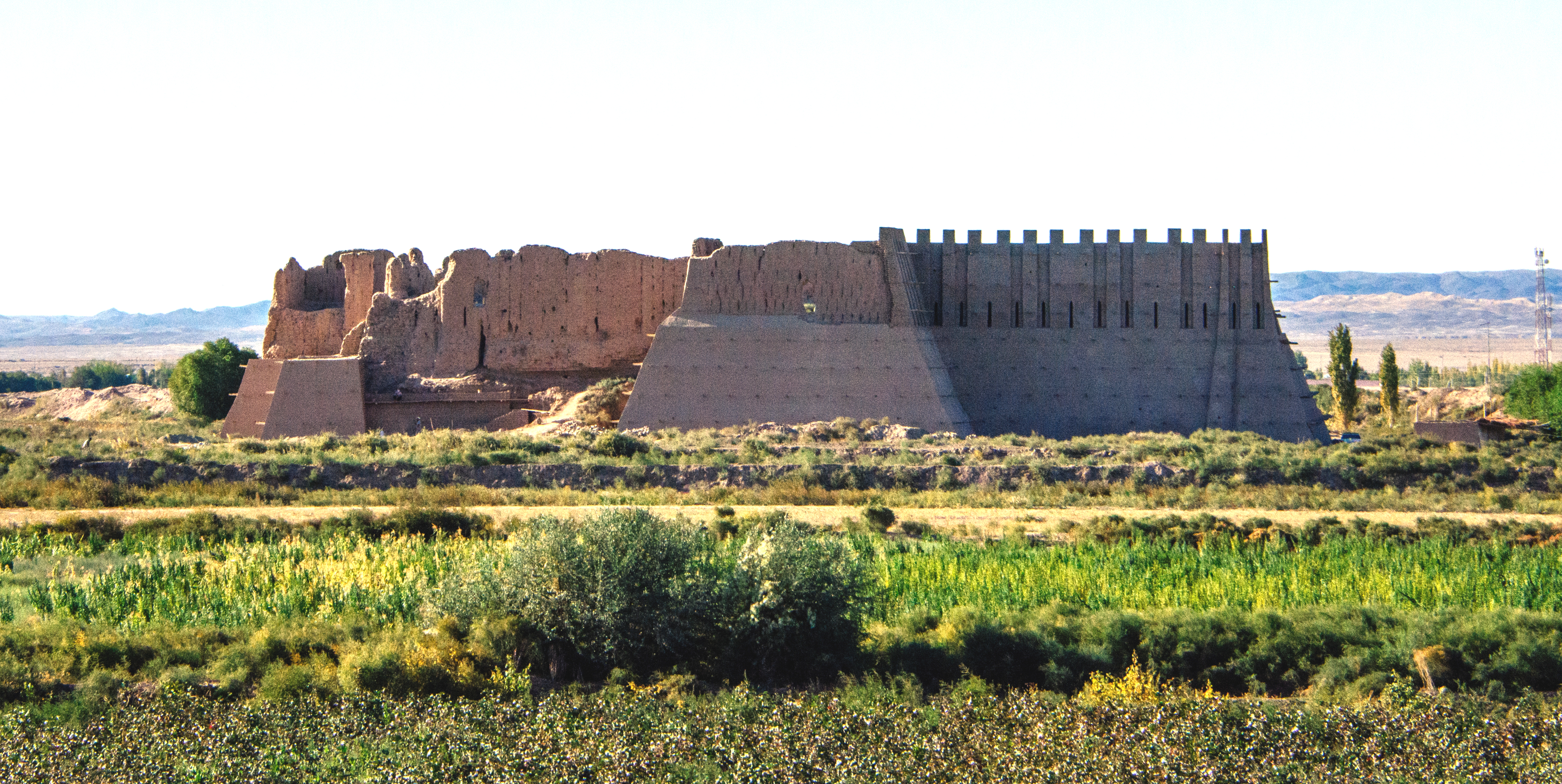
Ancient fortress of Kyzyl-Kala (1st–4th century AD), under restoration (2018)

Karakalpakstan preserves a massive archaeological record spanning from the Paleolithic era to the Timurid Empire. In ancient times, this region was known as Khorezm. Tazabagyab culture flourished here during 13th–11th centuries BC, as demonstrated by Bronze Age Kokcha-3 kurgans.

From about 500 BC to 500 AD, the region of modern Karakalpakstan was a thriving agricultural area supported by extensive irrigation. It was strategically important territory and fiercely contested, as is seen by the more than 50 Khorezm fortresses which were constructed here. The Karakalpak people, who used to be nomadic herders and fishers, were first recorded by foreigners in the 16th century.

Artifacts from several Khorezm archaeological expeditions are housed in Nukus at the Savitsky State Museum of Art, which holds over 15,000 archaeological items, as well as the State Museum of History and Culture of Karakalpakstan.

== Modern history ==
Karakalpakstan was ceded to the Russian Empire by the Khanate of Khiva in 1873.

Under Soviet rule, it was an autonomous area within the Russian Soviet Federative Socialist Republic before becoming part of Uzbekistan in 1936 as the Karakalpak ASSR.

The region was probably at its most prosperous in the 1960s and 1970s, when irrigation from the Amu Darya was being expanded. However, the evaporation of the Aral Sea has made Karakalpakstan one of Uzbekistan's poorest regions.

The region is suffering from extensive drought, partly due to climate patterns, but also largely because the Amu Darya and Syr Darya rivers are mostly diverted in the eastern parts of Uzbekistan. Crop failures have deprived about 48,000 people of their main source of income and shortages of potable water have created a surge of infectious diseases.

== Geography ==
Karakalpakstan is now mostly desert and is located in western Uzbekistan near the Aral Sea, in the lowest part of the Amu Darya basin. It has an area of 164,900 km^{2} and is surrounded by desert. The Kyzyl Kum Desert is located to the east and the Karakum Desert is located to the south. A rocky plateau extends west to the Caspian Sea.

== Politics ==
=== Autonomous status ===
Its predecessor, the Karakalpak Autonomous Soviet Socialist Republic, was an autonomous republic in the Soviet Union until its incorporation into the Uzbek Soviet Socialist Republic in 1932. The Republic of Karakalpakstan maintained its predecessor's formal sovereignty, even after the independence of Uzbekistan in 1991. Karakalpakstan shares veto power with Uzbekistan over decisions concerning its affairs. According to the constitution, relations between Karakalpakstan and Uzbekistan are "regulated by treaties and agreements" and any disputes are "settled by way of reconciliation". Article 89, chapter XVII, Constitution of Uzbekistan, provides that: "The Republic of Karakalpakstan shall have the right to secede from the Republic of Uzbekistan on the basis of a nationwide referendum held by the people of Karakalpakstan."

In July 2022, large protests broke out in the region over a proposed constitutional change which would strip Karakalpakstan of its autonomy. The proposed change was later scrapped in response to the demonstrations.

=== Leadership ===
The head of the republic is the Chairman of the Supreme Council of Karakalpakstan or parliament (known as the "President of the Republic" from 1991 to 1992). The head of the government is the Chairman of the Council of Ministers of Karakalpakstan.

One of the deputy chairmen of the Senate of the Oliy Majlis is a representative of Karakalpakstan as per the constitution.

== Demographics ==
On 1 July 2023, the population of Karakalpakstan was 1,986,900 people. It experienced an increase of 1.2% when compared to the corresponding period of 2022. The number of men (997,800) slightly exceeded the number of women (989,100). There were slightly more people living in rural areas (1,015,500) than in urban areas (971,400).

In 2007, it was estimated that about 400,000 of the population are of the Karakalpak ethnic group, 400,000 are Uzbeks and 300,000 are Kazakhs. Though 95% of Karakalpaks reside in Uzbekistan, mostly in Karakalpakstan, the Karakalpak language is closer to Kazakh than to Uzbek. The language was written in a modified Cyrillic in Soviet times and has been written in the Latin alphabet since 1996.

Other than the capital Nukus, major cities include Xojeli, Taqiyatas, Shimbay, Qońirat (Kungrad) and Moynaq.

The crude birth rate is 2.2%: approximately 39,400 children were born in 2017. Nearly 8,400 people died in the same period. The crude death rate is 0.47%. The natural growth rate is 31,000, or 1.72%.

The median age was 27.7 years old in 2017, which is younger than the rest of Uzbekistan (median age of 28.5 countrywide). Men are 27.1 years old, while women are 28.2 years old.

Dynamics of the number and ethnic composition of the population of Karakalpakstan according to the All-Union censuses of 1926–2026:

Nationality	1926 Census		1939 Census		1959 Census		1970 Census		1979 Census		1989 Census		2026 Census	
Nationality	#	%	#	%	#	%	#	%	#	%	#	%	#	%
Uzbeks	84,099	27.62%	116,054	24.71%	146,783	28.78%	212,597	30.27%	285,400	31.52%	397,826	32.82%	1,024,236	47.64%
Karakalpaks	116,125	38.13%	158,615	33.77%	155,999	30.58%	217,505	30.97%	281,809	31.12%	389,146	32.10%	772,340	35.92%
Kazakhs	85,782	28.17%	129,677	27.61%	133,844	26.24%	186,038	26.49%	243,926	26.94%	318,739	26.29%	236,563	11.00%
Turkmens	9,686	3.18%	23,259	4.95%	29,225	5.73%	37,547	5.35%	48,655	5.37%	60,244	4.97%	102,911	4.79%
Russians	4,924	1.62%	24,969	5.32%	22,966	4.50%	25,165	3.58%	21,287	2.35%	19,846	1.64%	7,507	0.35%
Kyrgyz	277	0.09%	181	0.04%	177	0.03%	400	0.06%	1,955	0.22%	867	0.07%	1,071	0.05%
Koreans			7,347	1.56%	9,956	1.95%	8,958	1.28%	8,081	0.89%	9,174	0.76%		
Tatars	884	0.29%	4,162	0.89%	6,177	1.21%	7,619	1.08%	7,617	0.84%	7,767	0.64%		
Ukrainians	621	0.20%	3,130	0.67%	2,201	0.43%	2,316	0.33%	2,005	0.22%	2,271	0.19%		
Bashkirs	29	0.01%	381	0.08%	571	0.11%	854	0.12%	920	0.10%	1,090	0.09%		
Moldovans	10	0.00%	16	0.00%			57	0.01%	343	0.04%	632	0.05%		
Belarusians	30	0.01%	214	0.05%	328	0.06%	517	0.07%	852	0.09%	567	0.05%		
other	2,072	0.68%	1,697	0.36%	1,874	0.37%	2,691	0.38%	2,650	0.29%	4,038	0.33%	5,304	0.25%
Total	304,539	100%	469,702	100%	510,101	100%	702,264	100%	905,500	100%	1,212,207	100%	2,149,932	100%

Historical population
Year	Pop.	±% p.a.
1979	904,315	—
1989	1,214,000	+2.99%
2000	1,503,000	+1.96%
2010	1,632,000	+0.83%
2020	1,898,351	+1.52%
Source: Citypopulation

== Economy ==
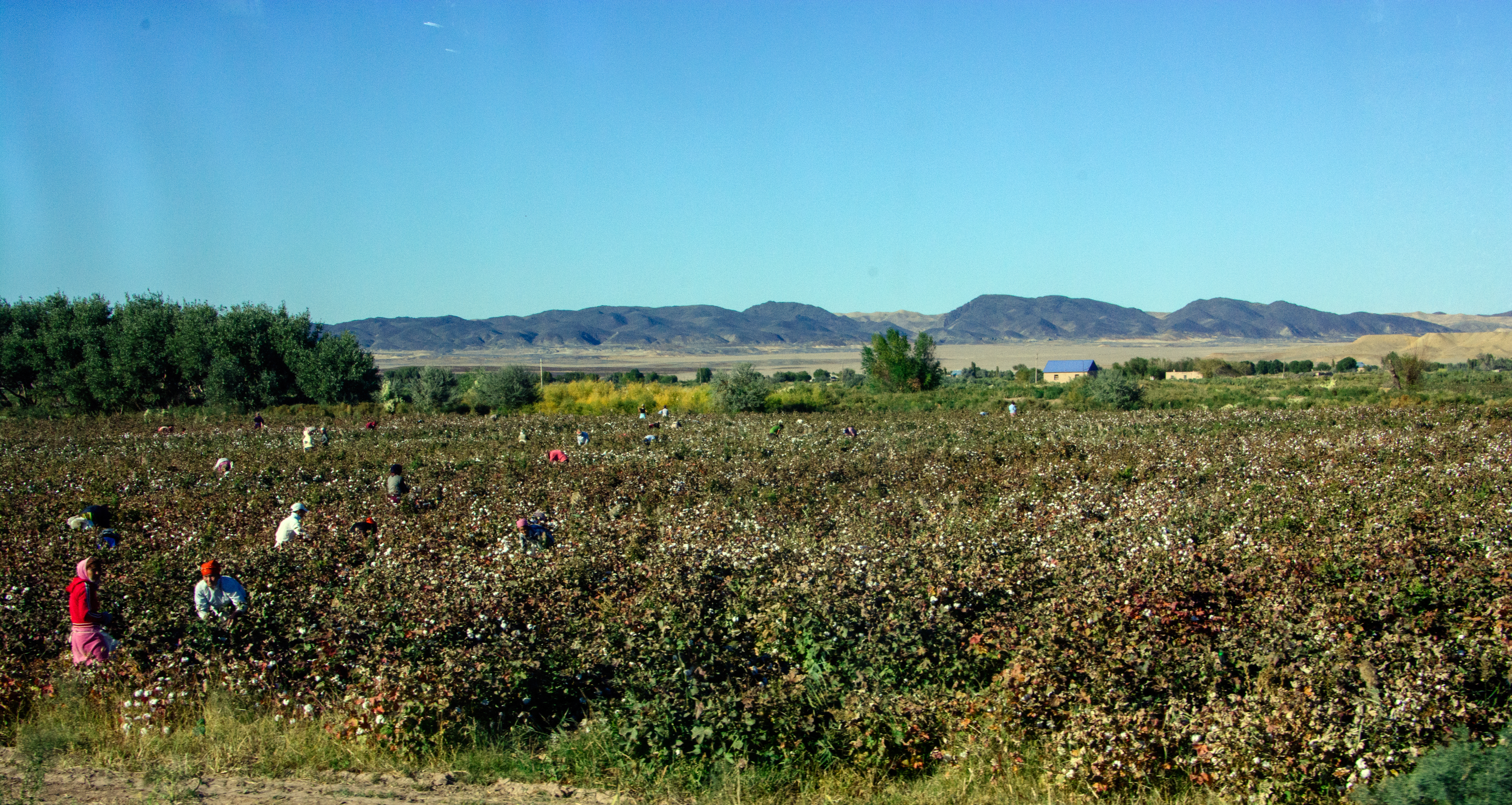
Cotton picking near Kyzyl-Kala

The economy of the region used to be heavily dependent on fisheries in the Aral Sea. It is now supported by cotton, rice, and fruits, such as plums, pears, grapes, and apricots, in addition to all kinds of melons. Hydroelectric power comes from a large Soviet-built station on the Amu Darya, which was once heavily populated and supported extensive irrigation based agriculture for thousands of years. Under the Khorezm, the area attained considerable power and prosperity.

However, climate change over the centuries, accelerated by the evaporation of the Aral Sea in the late 20th century has created a desolate scene in the region. The ancient oases of rivers, lakes, reed marshes, forests and farms are drying up and being poisoned by wind-borne salt and by fertilizer and pesticide residues from the dried bed of the Aral Sea. Summer temperatures have risen by 10 °C (18 °F) and winter temperatures have decreased by 10 °C (18 °F). The rates of incidence of anemia, respiratory diseases and other health problems has risen dramatically.

== Administrative divisions ==
Districts of Karakalpakstan

The autonomous republic of Karakalpakstan consists of 16 districts (listed below) and one district-level city: Nukus.

№	District name	District capital
1	Nókis city	
2	Amiwdárya district	Mańǵıt
3	Beruniy district	Beruniy
4	Bozataw district	Bozataw
5	Qanlikól district	Qanlıkól
6	Qaraózek district	Qaraózek
7	Kegeyli district	Kegeyli
8	Qońirat district	Qońırat
9	Moynaq district	Moynaq
10	Nókis district	Aqmańǵıt
11	Taqiyatas district	Taqiyatas
12	Taxtakópir district	Taxtakópir
13	Tórtkúl district	Tórtkúl
14	Xojeli district	Xojeli
15	Shimbay district	Shımbay
16	Shomanay district	Shomanay
17	Ellikqala district	Bostan

Taqiyatas district was created in 2017 from part of Xojeli district. Bozataw district was created in September 2019 from parts of the Kegeyli district and the Shimbay district.

There are 12 cities (Nókis, Mańģit, Beruniy, Xaliqabat, Qońirat, Moynaq, Taqiyatas, Tórtkúl, Xojeli, Shimbay, Shomanay, Bostan) and 26 urban-type settlements in Karakalpakstan.

== Media ==
=== Journalism ===
Journalists can face intimidation in the region, for example Lola Kallikhanova has been questioned by police, and prosecuted. This treatment of Kallikhanova and other journalists was condemned by the Coalition for Women in Journalism.

=== Radio ===
In 2009, the first radio station of Karakalpakstan was opened, in Nukus. Named 'Nukus FM', the station broadcasts on radio frequency 100.4 MHz.

=== Television ===
Qaraqalpaqstan tеlеvideniesi is an Uzbek television channel that broadcasts to the autonomous republic of Karakalpakstan. The channel airs programming in four languages, Karakalpak, Uzbek, Kazakh and Russian.

== See also ==
- Delta Blues (documentary film)
- Human rights in Uzbekistan
- Karakalpak Autonomous Oblast, a short-lived Soviet entity
- Karakalpak Autonomous Soviet Socialist Republic, an autonomous republic of the Russian Soviet Federative Socialist Republic and then the Uzbek SSR
- Mizdahkan
- Uzbekisation
- Turkification
- Madjars
- 2022 Karakalpak protests
