= Battle of Dzhulek =

- Part of the Russo–Kokand War and the Russian conquest of Central Asia
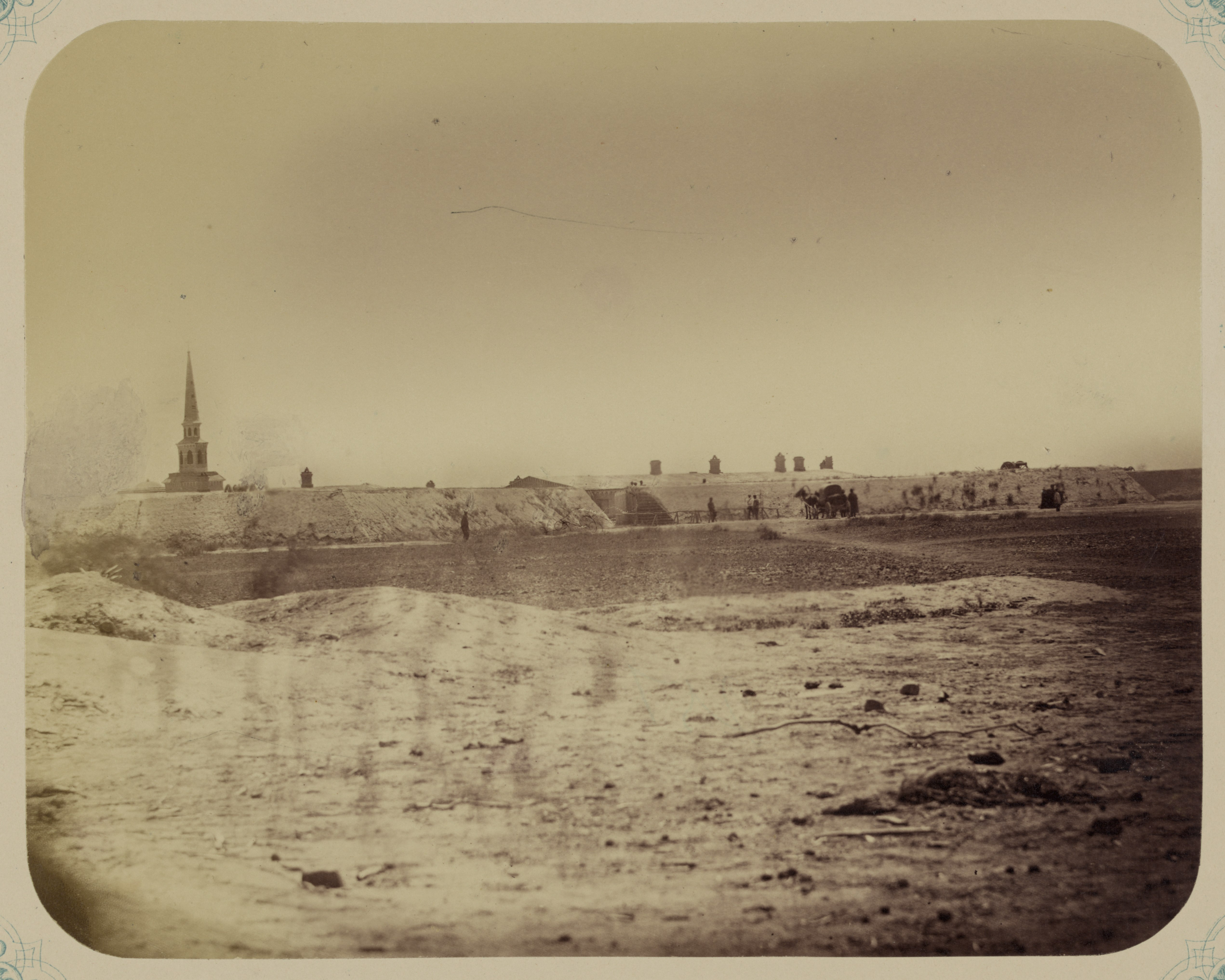
- Dzhulek Fort – Photo taken between 1871–1872
Date	20 October 1861
Location	Dzhulek Fort, right bank of the Syr Darya river - (Modern day Kazakhstan)
Result	Russian victory Russians survive the engagement

Belligerents
Russian Empire	Khanate of Kokand

Commanders and leaders
Priv. Mikhail Ivanov †; Priv. Alexander Lyzlov; Priv. Vasily Ivanov; Feklist Sutyagin	Unknown

Strength
11 infantry 9 cossacks Total: 20	300

Casualties and losses
4 killed 5 wounded	Several dozen killed or wounded - exact number unknown.

The Battle of Dzhulek, also known as the Action at Dzhulek, was a small military engagement between the Russian Empire and the Khanate of Kokand that took place on October 20, 1861. The small engagement was a part of the Russian conquest of Central Asia.

During the battle, a small group of Russian soldiers were attacked and encircled by a superior force of Kokand tribesmen. Despite being outnumbered, the Russian soldiers managed to fight off the attacks and to survive the engagement.

== Background ==
Fort Dzhulek was a fort that was established right bank of the Syr Darya river. It was originally built by the Kokand people before being conquered by the Russian army.

It was taken by the Russians in 1853 at the same time as Ak-Mechet was. Fort Dzhulek became a part of the Syr-Darya line – a logistical and a defensive line in the region. Located between Orenburg and Tashkent, the fort acted as a resupply point and a mail delivery station.

Fort Dzhulek was located near another Kokand fort known as Yany-Kurgan – modern day Zhanakorgan. In terms of size and defensive capabilities, Yany-Kurgan was similar to Ak-Mechet. Yany-Kurgan served as a foothold for Kokand military operations in the region.

In September, 1861, the Russian army, under the command of Alexander Debu, carried out a successful campaign in which Yany-Kurgan was captured and destroyed. The 4th Turkestan Line Battalion participated in the capture of Yany-Kurgan.

In October, 1861, Kokand tribesmen performed a strategic raid in the region. Several hundred tribesmen crossed the Syr Darya river and they traveled along the routes. Their intent was to raid and to loot for supplies. They did not have any intention of besieging or capturing any fort because they did not have sufficient manpower to capture a well fortified position. Instead of besieging the Dzhulek fort, the Kokand army went around it. The Kokand tribesmen performed their maneuvers with excellent stealth such that the fort's commandant was unaware of the enemy's presence.

On October 20, the fort's commandant send 11 ox-wagons to the nearby Fort-Perovsky in order to get a supply of fodder. The wagon train was escorted by a total of 20 men including 11 infantry soldiers of the 4th Turkestan Line Battalion and 9 Ural cossacks. After acquiring the fodder, the wagon train made its journey back to Fort Dzhulek. About 7–8 km from the fort, the wagon train encountered an army of 300 Kokand horsemen waiting on top of a barchan. The superior Kokand army decided to attack the small wagon train.

== Battle ==
The Russians used the wagons as miniature forts for personal defense. They repelled the first Kokand attack with accurate rifle fire at a close range. In this engagement, the Russians were armed with the M1856 rifled musket which was superior in firepower and accuracy when compared compared to the weapons of the Kokand tribesmen. The Russians lost a few horses and ox in the first attack. After repelling the first attack, the Russians continued their journey to Fort Dzhulek hoping to reach safety. The Kokand horsemen soon launched a second attack and a third attack. Both attacks were repelled and the Russians still tried to reach the fort in between the attacks.

After repelling the third attack, the Russians decided to occupy the barchan where the Kokandi were first sighted. They left behind nine of their wagons and the remainder of the men spread among the two wagons. They reached the foot of the barchan before performing an assault and driving the tribesmen off the hill. Once the Russians secured the hill, they entrenched themselves into the sand and continued repelling the Kokand attacks. With their new entrenched position, the Russians had an uphill advantage which helped them to repel the Kokand attacks much easier.

After launching several more unsuccessful attacks, the Kokand tribesmen abandoned the battle. The remainder of the Russians survived the engagement, although they were running low on ammunition. The Russians resumed their march to Fort Dzhulek. On the way, they met with a Cossack detachment that safely escorted them back to the fort.

== Aftermath ==
As a result of this engagement, the Russian lost three infantry and one Cossack killed with two infantry and three Cossack wounded – a total of four killed and five wounded. The Kokand tribesmen lost dozens of men either killed or wounded.

The following day, the Russians went back to the battlefield to extract the bodies of their fallen comrades. There they discovered Private Kirill Antonov who was severely wounded but alive. Antonov suffered one gunshot wound and four saber wounds, three of which struck him in the head. Despite his injuries, Antonov managed to survive the night and make a full recovery once he was extracted from the battlefield.

The small handful of Russian soldiers managed to successfully fight off an enemy who had 15 times more men. Their courage served as a model of bravery and dedication for the Russian army. All 16 men who survived the engagement received some form of reward or promotion with 8 men receiving the Cross of St. George.
