= Capture of Yany-Kurgan =

1861 military engagement

- Part of the Russo–Kokand War and Russian conquest of Central Asia
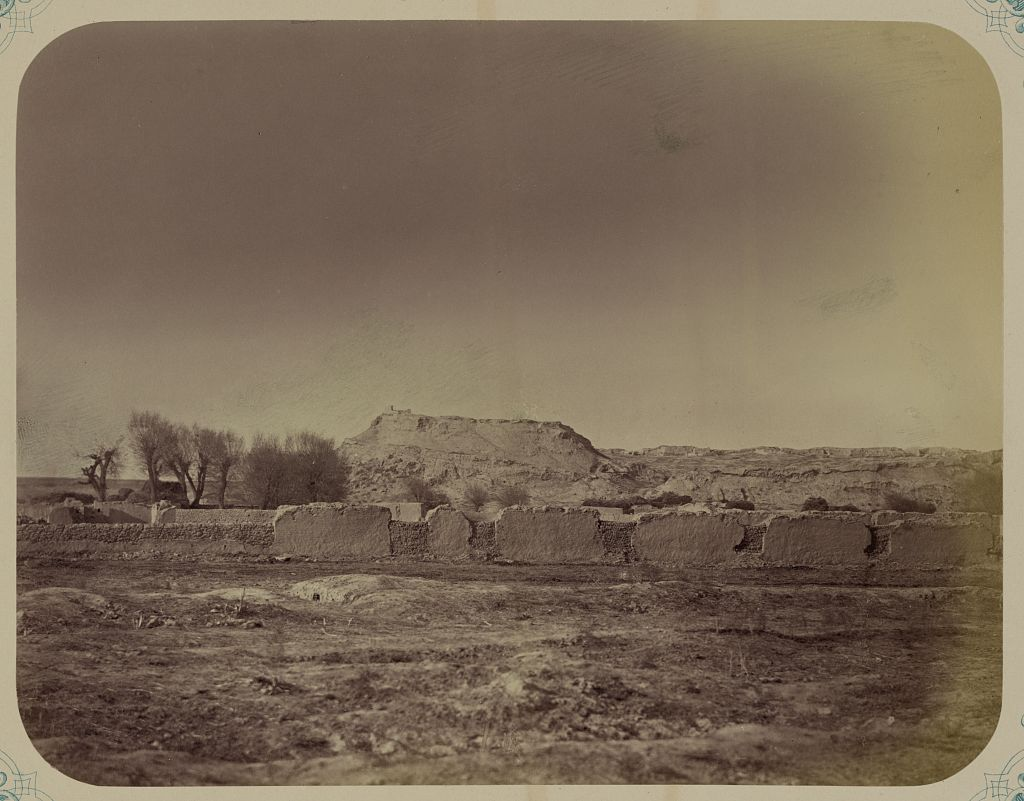
- The ruins of Yany-Kurgan - captured and destroyed in September, 1861. This photo was taken by Mikhail Terentyev between 1871 and 1872.
Date	22–23 September 1861
Location	Yany-Kurgan (present day Zhanakorgan, Kazakhstan)
Result	Russian victory Yany-Kurgan is destroyed
Territorial changes	Russia consolidates its conquests in Kazakhstan.

Belligerents
Russian Empire	(Khanate of Kokand) Kokand Khanate

Commanders and leaders
(Russian Empire) Alexander Debu (Russian Empire) Colonel Sakharov (Khanate of Kokand) Sultan Irmukhamed Kasimov	(Khanate of Kokand) Khoja-bek Qasymbek (surrendered)

Units involved
4th Turkestan Line Battalion; Ural cossacks	Kokand irregulars Kokand cavalry

Strength
Total: 1,008; 39 officers 519 infantry 200 cossacks 250 Kyrgyz volunteers 6 mortars 3 licorne 3 rocket launchers	220 men 40 civilians

Casualties and losses
4 wounded (one later died of wounds)	4 killed 3 wounded 100 deserted 160 surrendered including civilians (later released)

Capture of Yany-Kurgan, also known as the Siege of Yany-Kurgan, was a military engagement between the Russian Empire and the Kokand Khanate that took place during the Russian conquest of Central Asia in September, 1861.

The Russian Army, led by Alexander Debu, besieged the Kokand stronghold of Yany-Kurgan. During the quick siege, the Russian army successfully captured and destroyed the stronghold.

Despite being a small engagement when compared to other campaigns of the conquest, it was a significant engagement because it deprived the Kokand of strategic initiative in the region. Following the destruction of Yany-Kurgan, the Russians would launch further campaigns and capture more cities in Turkestan.

== Background ==
During the early campaigns in Turkestan, the Russian army saw limited success.

The early Russian conquests included:

- Kenesary's Rebellion 1837-1847
- Khivan campaign of 1839–1840
- Uprising of Eset Batyr 1847-1858
- Siege of Ak-Mechet 1853

By 1855, most of Kazakhstan was conquered by the Russian Empire. The Russian foreign policy changed following the defeat in the Crimean War. Following the defeat, the Russian army launched more campaigns to conquest more territory.

A new frontier was formed following the establishment of the Syr Darya line - a logistical and a defensive line in the region. The Syr Darya line consisted of a network of forts including Fort Perovsky, former Ak-Mechet, and Fort Dzhulek. In May, 1859, Alexander Debu became the commander of the Syr Darya line.

Despite suffering defeats, the Kokand still had the fort of Yany-Kurgan on the right bank of the Syr Darya river. The fort served as a lodgement that allowed the Kokand armies to operate in the region. It was a major stronghold and a resupply point for the Kokand tribesmen. Further Russian campaigns would not be possible until the fort was destroyed.

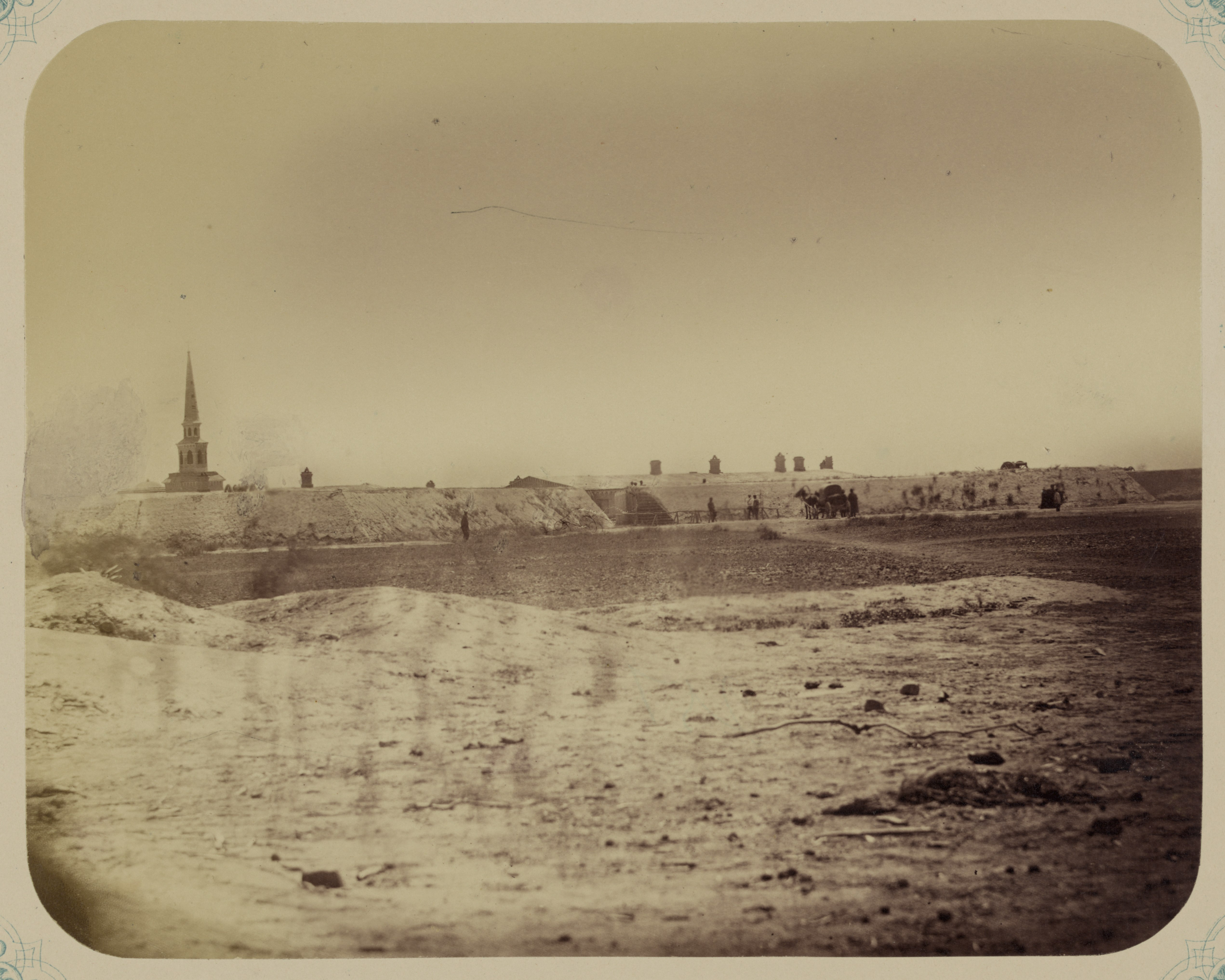
Fort Dzhulek, the fort from which Debu's army marched towards Yany-Kurgan. Photograph taken between 1871 and 1872.

Fort Dzhulek was originally destroyed during the Siege of Ak-Mechet. It's reconstruction started in spring of 1861 and it was completed in August of the same year. In September 1861, Debu gathered an army at Fort Dzhulek to capture Yany-Kurgan.

Debu's army consisted of the following:

- 7 staff officers
- 32 ober officers
- 519 infantry
- 200 Ural Cossacks
- 250 Kyrgyz volunteers
- 6 mortars
- 3 licornes
- 3 rocket launchers

Total: 1,008 men and 12 artillery. The army used horses and camels as transportation and it had enough supplies to last for 20 days.

On 20 September 1861 the Russian army marched out of Fort Dzhulek towards Yany-Kurgan. The distance between the two forts was 90 versts - about 95 kilometres. The Russian army reached Yany-Kurgan on 22 September and laid siege the same day.

== Siege ==
=== The fort of Yany-Kurgan ===
Yany-Kurgan was a rectangular fort. The dimensions of the fort was about 50 by 50 sazhens - 106 by 106 metes. The fort had one tower in each corner and a fifth tower beside the main gate. In general, the fort's walls were 3-4 sazhens thick - 6–8 meters - and 10 arshins tall - about 7 meters. The fort was surrounded by a moat that was 2.5 meters deep and 6.5 meters wide. The fort had loopholes for the defenders to return fire. The fort was located in a relatively open field with the exception of some hills north of the fort. The fort was located at a distance from the Syr Darya river which allowed the Russians to cut off its water supply once it was surrounded.

=== Preparation ===
Debu sent a cossack detachment to scout the area before his main army reached it. By the time his army reached the fort, he had a plan of how to besiege Yany-Kurgan.

On 22 September, Debu ordered for several artillery batteries to be constructed. Several batteries were built in the hills north of the fort and one battery was built on the side of the river. The sites chosen for the batteries were good and that advantage allowed the batteries to be constructed quickly. Before commencing artillery bombardment, Debu sent an offer for surrender. The Kokand commander, Khoja-bek Qasymbek, rejected the offer claiming that he will not surrender for at least three days.

=== Siege ===
After Debu received the rejection, he ordered for the artillery bombardment to start. The bombardment started at 11 in the morning. As the Russian artillery bombarded the fort, corrections were made and some artillery was rearranged for better accuracy. Some artillery fired at a distance of 360 meters while some mortars fired from a distance of 55 meters.

The Kokand defenders returned fire, but their firepower was outmatched by the much more advanced Russian artillery and rifle fire. By noon, the artillery bombardment started a fire within the fort. The fire lasted until the night. As night approached, the Russian army made preparations to storm the fort. Under the leadership of Colonel Sakharov, the Russians made siege ladders and dug trenches as close as 50 meters to the fort's walls.

Russian artillery continued bombarding the fort throughout the night. During the night, two more fires broke out within the fort as a result of Russian bombardment. By the morning of 23 September, the Russian trenches were gradually advancing closer to the fort and so was Debu moving his artillery closer to the fort's walls. Before Debu's artillery advanced too close, a parlimentaire arrived from the fort with a message stating that they are surrendering, with the only exception that they will surrender by the evening. Debu, having previously received an update that a Kokand relief army was on the way to Yany-Kurgan, rejected any exceptions and demanded that the fort immediately surrendered. Debu gave them 30 minutes to decide. The Kokand commander accepted Debu's demands and at 1:00 noon the fort surrendered.

=== Casualties and losses ===
Debu's army suffered only four men wounded. One of the wounded soldiers would later die from his wounds.

Despite enduring heavy artillery bombardment, the Kokand garrison lost only four men killed and three men wounded. The low number of casualties was attributed to the good bomb shelters that were within the fort. However, most of the Kokand livestock, horses, and cattle was killed by the bombardment. According to the fort's commander Khoja-bek Qasymbek, about 100 Kokand men deserted the fort during the night. The remaining 160 people surrendered, including around 40 women and children. The fires started by Russian bombardment forced the Kokand to surrender. The smoke chocked the garrison and there was a fear that the fire would cause their gunpowder storage to explode.

== Aftermath ==
The Kokand soldiers were ordered to surrender their arms. The only ones allowed to keep their arms were Khoja-bek Qasymbek and several of his officers. After ensuring that his men left, Khoja-bek Qasymbek requested himself to be taken as a prisoner to Fort Dzhulek. His request originated out of fear of execution for surrendering the fort. His request was granted and he was taken prisoner.

According to multiple sources, Debu's army captured the following:

- 2 Kokand regimental colors
- 40 rifles
- 30 muskets
- 1 musketoon
- 11 falconets
- 30 shashkas
- 2 drums and other miscellaneous items
- 50 poods of gunpowder - about 820 kilograms

Russians used the captured gunpowder to destroy the fort. On 25 September 1861, Yany-Kurgan was blown up. Debu's army returned to Fort Dzhulek.

The capture and destruction of Yany-Kurgan was a small engagement when compared with other battles of the conquest; however, it was a significant engagement because the loss of Yany-Kurgan deprived the Kokand of a strategic lodgement in the region. Following the capture of Yany-Kurgan, the Kokand armies could no longer perform military operations in the region. Kokand tribesmen would continue to perform raids, one such raid being the Action at Dzhulek in October of the same year, but they lost any hopes of regaining the lost territory. In the following years, the Russians would launch further campaigns and capture more cities in Turkestan.

Alexander Debu died in Fort Dzhulek in September 1862. He died while still being in command of the Syr Darya line.
