= Anti-colonial uprising of Eset Batyr =

Anti-Colonial uprising of Eset Batyr
- Part of Kazakh rebellions and the Russian conquest of Central Asia
Date	1847–1858
Location	Territory of the Junior Jüz
Result	Uprising suppressed

Belligerents
Kazakh rebels	Russian Empire

Commanders and leaders
Eset Kotibaruli; Satai Kotibaruli; Matai Kotibaruli; Ernazar Kenzhalin	(Russian Empire) Alexander Katenin (Russian Empire) Arystan Janturin † (Russian Empire) Tuganchin Sultan † (Russian Empire) Taukin Sultan (Russian Empire) Major Mikhailov (Russian Empire) Esaul Qasimov (Russian Empire) Vasily Perovsky (Russian Empire) Baron Wrangel (Russian Empire) Cossack Tkachev

Strength
In 1853: 800 troops In 1854: 1,500 troops (Spring); 60 troops (Summer); In 1855: 1,500 troops	(Russian Empire) In 1853: More than 800 troops In 1855: 80 troops (Summer); In 1856: About 1,050 troops In 1857: 300 troops

Casualties and losses
Unknown	(Russian Empire) About 80 killed

Anti-Colonial uprising of Eset Batyr — uprising of the Kazakhs of the Junior Jüz against the colonial oppression of the Russian Empire.

== Uprising ==
In the summer of 1847, in the area of the Emba River, Eset Batyr attacked the royal punitive detachment. Subsequently, the batyr's attacks on Russian troops continued.

The Tsar's administration sent two Cossack detachments and 200 Kazakhs controlled by Sultan Taukin and Major Mikhailov from the Ural division. Also, 600 Kazakhs were sent under the leadership of Elekey Qasimov by the Tsar administration. Eset Batyr sent 800 people against Russian troops who were destroyed by people of Eset Batyr.

In 1854–1858, there was uprising of Kazakhs living in Aral region, due to high taxes of the Tsar administration. At that time, extortion or taxes carried out by camels. For instance, the military campaign of Vasily Perovsky in 1853 to conquer city of Ak-Mechet (Modern Kyzylorda) in Kazakhstan required almost 8 thousand camel.

Kazakhs organized an uprising and moved to the territory of the Emba River.

The rebels put a number of demands: removal of tax for households, termination of sending of punitive detachments to the Kazakh steppe, allowing usage of pastures and the possibility to move on the banks of rivers Zhem, Mugadzhar, Elek, Kobda, Zhaiyk. V.A. Perovsky organized a punitive detachment and sent Baron Wrangel with a large army to suppress the uprisings.

Eset Batyr agreed with Baron Wrangel, but the war did not stop and the rebels continued to raid military fortifications, stole horses, and attacked Russian Cossack detachments. On August 21, 1854, brothers K. Satay and K. Matai with a group of 60 people attacked the Ural fortification. In 1855, rebels led by Ernazar Kenzhalin defeated Tkachev's Cossack detachment.

In June 1855, the Orenburg Governor-General gave the task to the Sultan of the Junior Zhuz, Arslan Janturin, to catch Eset Kotibaruli. A punitive detachment sent by the Orenburg authorities brutally dealt with the civilian population of Kazakh Auls. Having learned about this, Eset gathered a detachment of 1500 Shektins and surrounded the detachment of Arslan Janturin. The Kazakhs in the detachment were given the opportunity to escape and they immediately took advantage of it. The Sultan, unloved by the common people, remained with a Cossack detachment of 80 people. Due to the distance from the Kazakh camp, the Cossacks were unable to help Dzhantyurin and he was hacked to death by Eset and several of his comrades.

In September 1857, a Russian detachment unexpectedly attacked the camp of Eset Kotibarov and destroyed the villages of the Kazakhs who had joined him. Eset managed to escape with a small detachment and retreated to the border with the Khanate of Khiva. After this attack, Eset Batyr nevertheless entered into negotiations with the Russian government. They began in the fall of 1858. According to their results, the batyr, in exchange for a reduction in taxes for the Kazakhs of the Junior Zhuz and the opportunity to roam along the banks of the Emba and Zhaiyk, was forced to recognize the power of the Russian Tsar and lay down his arms. Governor-General of the Orenburg Region A.A. Katenin granted amnesty to the hero.
