= Russian conquest of Central Asia =

Period in Russian and Central Asian history

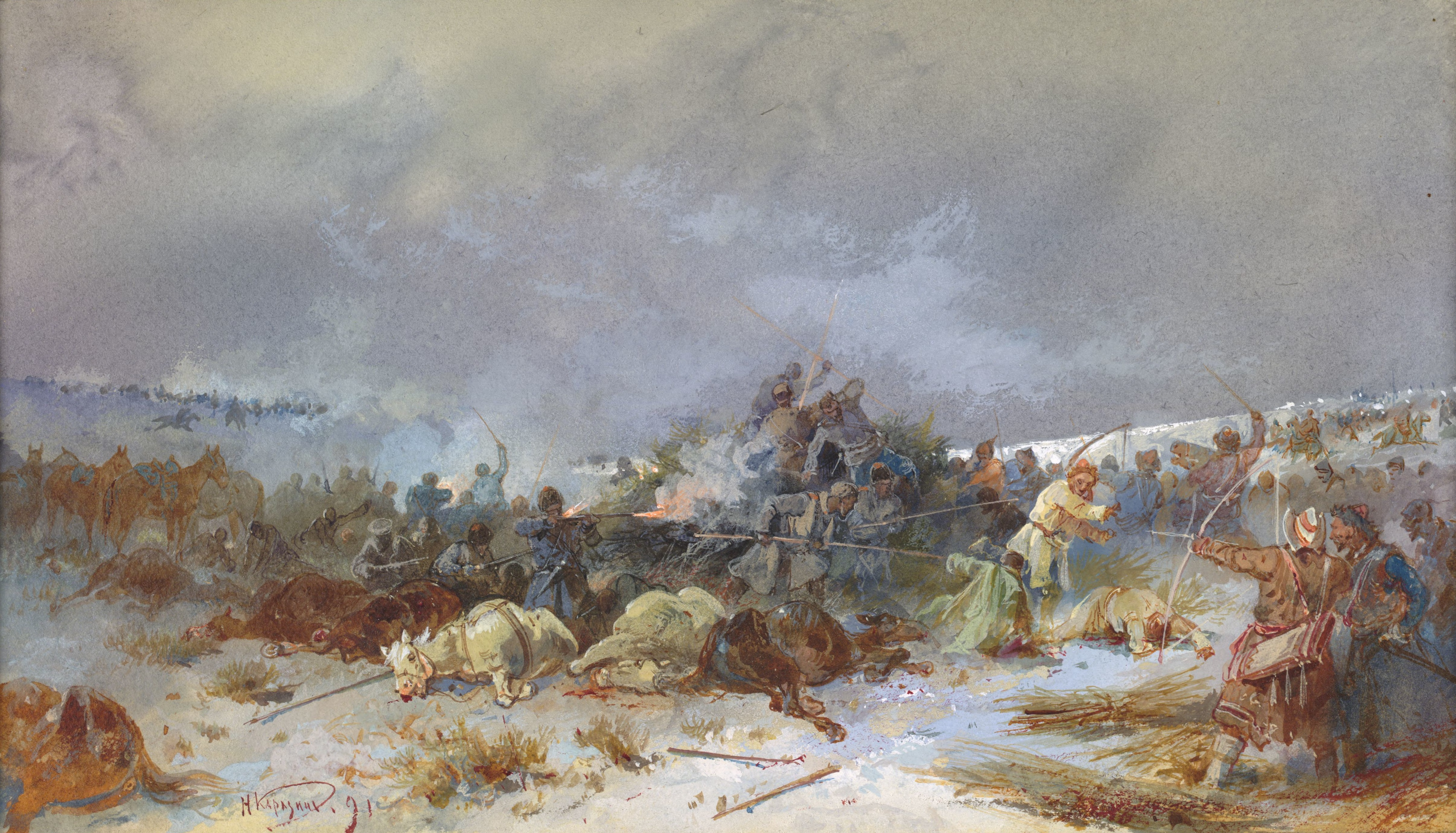
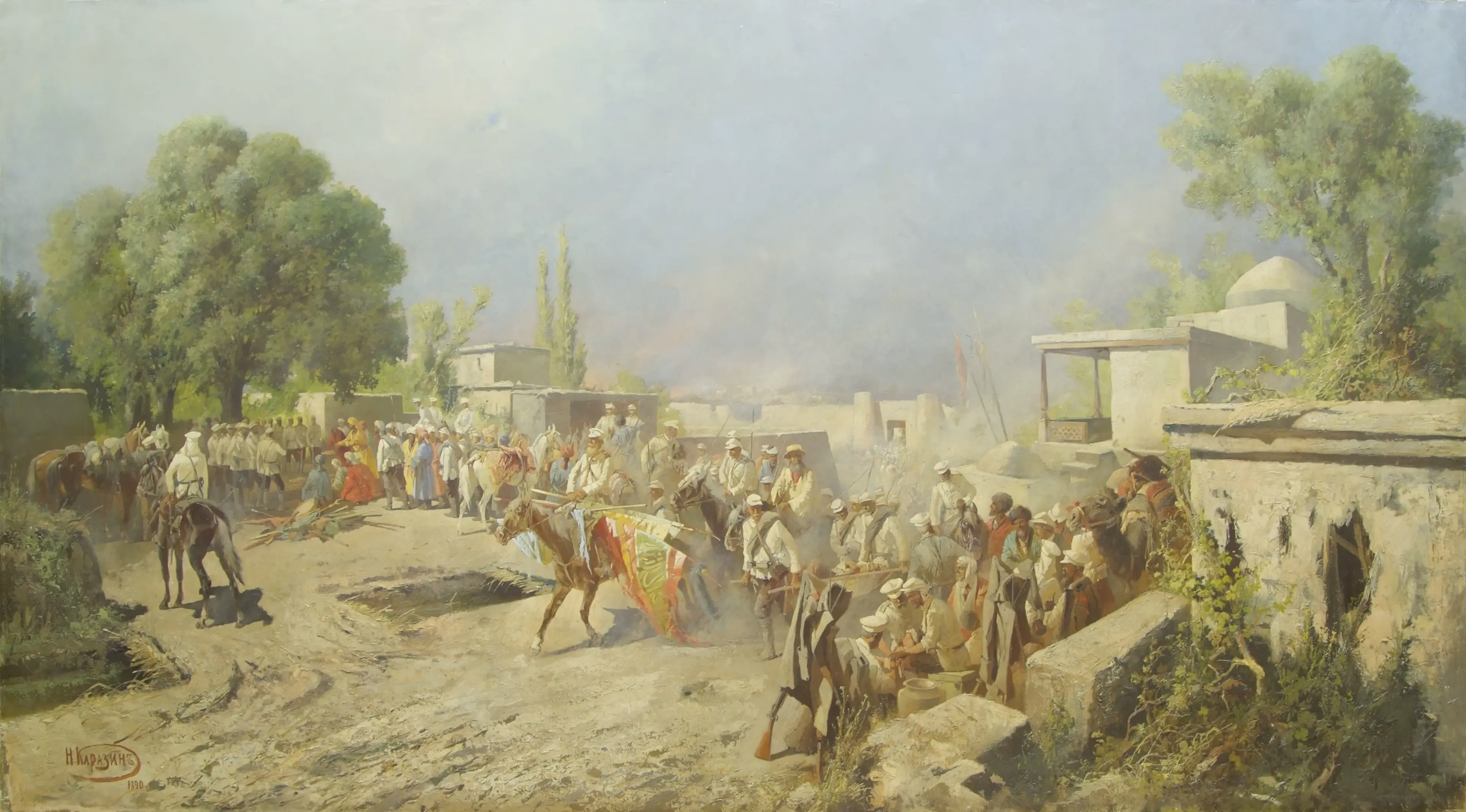
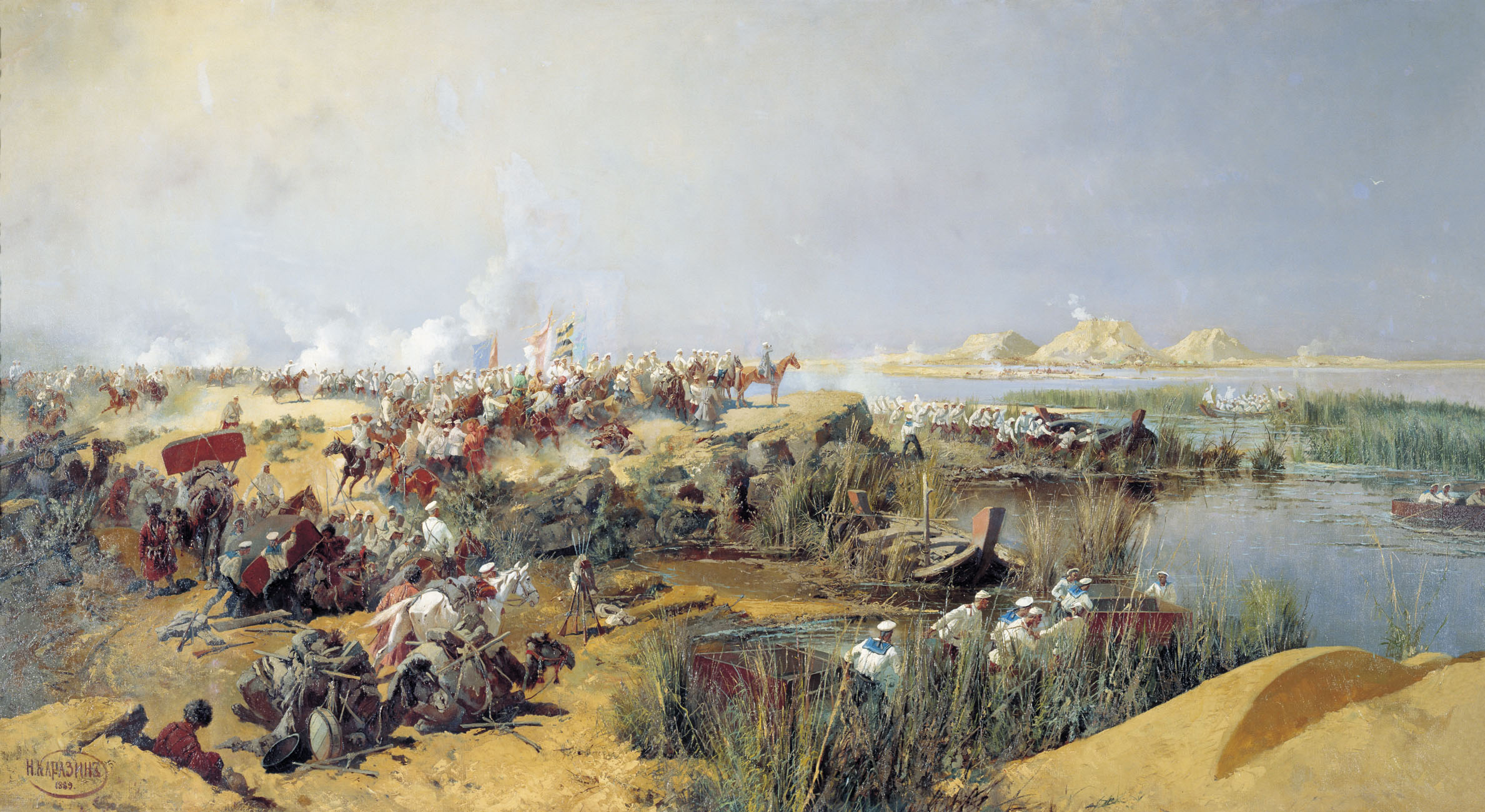
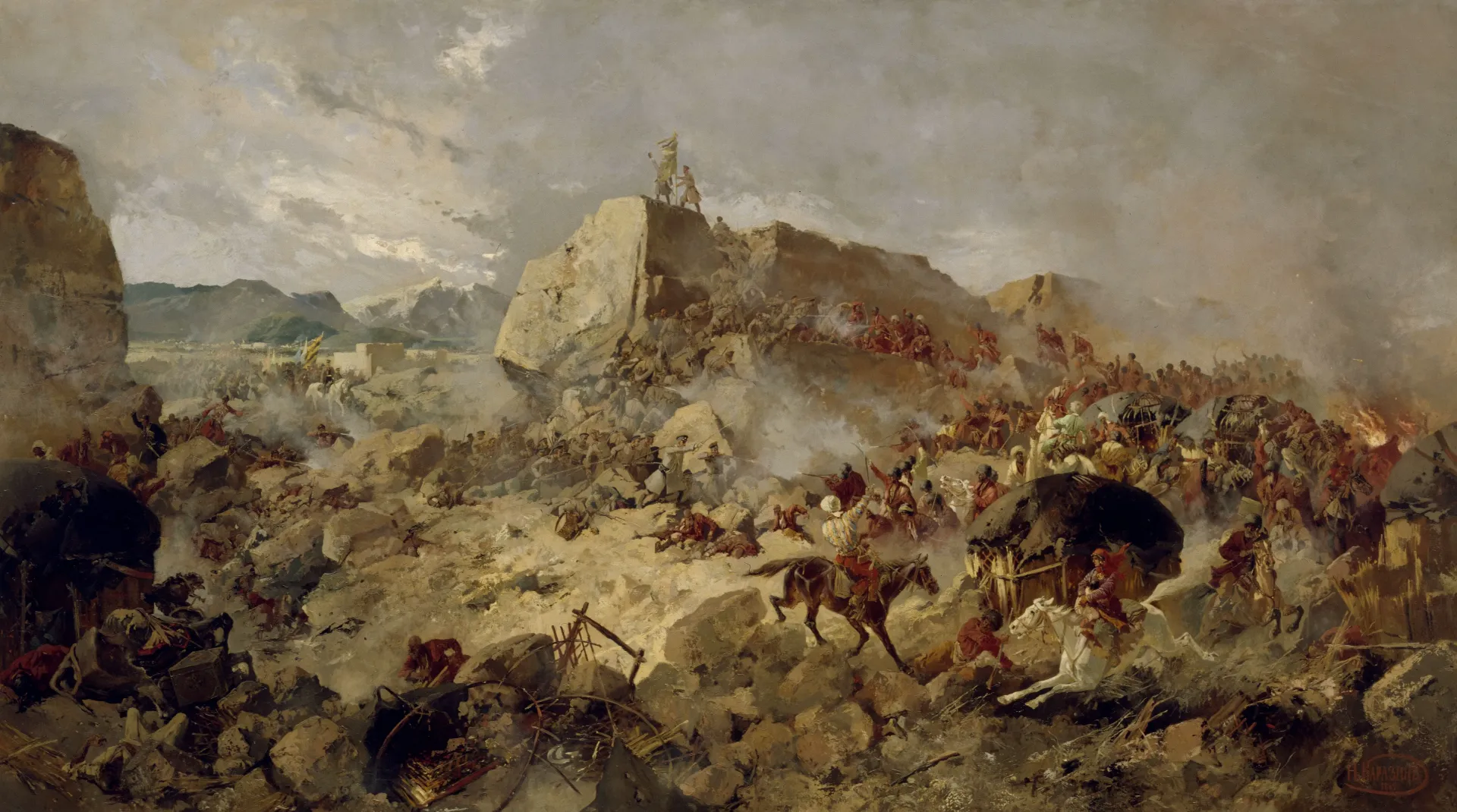
- Clockwise from top left: The Battle of Aktau Fortress, the siege of Tashkent, the battle of Geok Tepe and the Khivan campaign of 1873
Date	1717–1895
Location	Central Asia
Result	Russian victory
Territorial changes	Russian Turkestan is established; The Khanate of Kokand, and regions of the Emirate of Bukhara and the Khanate of Khiva are annexed by the Russian Empire; The Emirate of Bukhara and the Khanate of Khiva are made protectorates of the Russian Empire

Belligerents
Tsardom of Russia (1717–1721); Russian Empire (1721–1895); Kara-Kyrgyz Khanate (1842–1855); Allied Turkic tribes	Kazakh rebels; Khanate of Khiva (1717–1873); Kara-Kyrgyz Khanate (1855–1867); Khanate of Kokand (1853–1876); Emirate of Bukhara (1866–1868); Turkmen tribes; Emirate of Afghanistan (1885); United Kingdom (1885)

Commanders and leaders
(Russian Empire) Peter I; (Russian Empire) Anna; (Russian Empire) Nicholas I; (Russian Empire) Alexander II; (Russian Empire) Alexander III; Ormon Khan (executed); List of commanders: (Russian Empire) Alexander Bekovich-Cherkassky (executed); (Russian Empire) Mikhail Chernyayev; (Russian Empire) Konstantin von Kaufman; (Russian Empire) Nikolai Lomakin; (Russian Empire) Vasily Perovsky; (Russian Empire) Dmitry Romanovsky; (Russian Empire) Mikhail Skobelev	Kenesary Qasymuly †; Eset Kotibaruli; Shergazi Khan; Allah Kuli Bahadur Khan; Muhammad Rahim Khan II (surrendered); (Khanate of Kokand) Muhammad Khudayar Khan (surrendered); (Khanate of Kokand) Muhammad Malla Beg Khan; (Khanate of Kokand) Nasruddin Khan (surrendered); (Khanate of Kokand) Alimqul †; (Khanate of Kokand) Syzdyk Sultan; (Khanate of Kokand) Abdurrahman-Avtobachi (surrendered); (Khanate of Kokand) Pulat Khan (executed); (Emirate of Bukhara) Muzaffar bin Nasrullah (surrendered); Naib Salar Teimour Shah (WIA); (British Empire) Charles Yate

In the 16th century, the Tsardom of Russia embarked on a campaign to expand the Russian frontier to the east. This effort continued until the 19th century under the Russian Empire, when the Imperial Russian Army succeeded in conquering all of Central Asia. The majority of this land became known as Russian Turkestan—the name "Turkestan" was used to refer to the area due to the fact that the vast majority of the population was inhabited by Turkic peoples, excluding the Tajiks, who are ethnolinguistically Iranian people; the ethnolinguistic map of the region has not changed significantly since then. Upon witnessing Russia's absorption of the various Central Asian realms, the British Empire sought to reinforce India, triggering the Great Game, which ended when both sides eventually designated Afghanistan as a neutral buffer zone.

Although the Russian Empire collapsed during World War I, the Russian sphere of influence remained in what was Soviet Central Asia until 1991. This region now comprises Kazakhstan in the north, Uzbekistan in the centre, Kyrgyzstan in the east, Tajikistan in the southeast, and Turkmenistan in the southwest; the Russian language is still recognized in some capacity in many of these countries.

== Background ==
When the Russians arrived the organized states were the Khanate of Khiva in the Oxus delta south of the Aral Sea, the Khanate of Bukhara along the Oxus and Zarafshan and the Khanate of Kokand based in the Ferghana Valley. Bukhara had borders with the other two and all three were surrounded by nomads which the Khanates tried to control and tax.

=== Siberia ===
Russians first came into contact with Central Asia when, in 1582–1639, Cossack adventurers made themselves masters of the Siberian forests. They did not expand south because they were seeking furs. The Siberian Cossacks were skilled in forest travel and knew little of the steppe and since the forest tribes were few and weak while the steppe nomads were numerous and warlike.

=== Up the Irtysh River ===
The Irtysh River rises in what is now China and flows northwest to the Russian base at Tobolsk (founded in 1587). It was thought possible to ascend this river and reach the riches of China and India. In 1654, Fyodor Baykov used this route to reach Peking. The main advance was made under Peter the Great. Some time before 1714 Colonel Bukhholts and 1,500 men went upriver to a "Lake Yamysh" and returned. In 1715, Bukhholts with 3,000 men and 1,500 soldiers went to Lake Yamysh again and started to build a fort. Since this was on the fringe of the Dzungar Khanate, the Dzungars drove them off. They retreated downriver and founded Omsk. In 1720, Ivan Likharev went upriver and founded Ust-Kamenogorsk. The Dzungars, having just been weakened by the Chinese, left them alone. Several other places were built on the Irtysh at about this time.

=== Around the southern Urals ===
In 1556, Russia conquered the Astrakhan Khanate on the north shore of the Caspian Sea. The surrounding area was held by the Nogai Horde. To the east of the Nogais were the Kazakhs and to the north, between the Volga and Urals, were the Bashkirs. Around this time some free Cossacks had established themselves on the Ural River. In 1602, they captured Konye-Urgench in Khivan territory. Returning laden with loot they were surrounded by the Khivans and slaughtered. A second expedition lost its way in the snow, starved, and the few survivors were enslaved by the Khivans. There seems to have been a third expedition which is ill-documented.

Central Asia in 1636

At the time of Peter the Great there was a major push southeast. In addition to the Irtysh expeditions above, there was the disastrous 1717 attempt to conquer Khiva. Following the Russo-Persian War (1722–1723) Russia briefly occupied the west side of the Caspian Sea.

About 1734, another move was planned, which provoked the Bashkir War (1735–1740). Once Bashkiria was pacified, Russia's southeastern frontier was the Orenburg line roughly between the Urals and the Caspian Sea.

=== The Siberian line ===
Siberian Line about 1800
=the three Khanates

By the late 18th century, Russia held a line of forts roughly along the current Kazakhstan border, which is approximately the boundary between forest and steppe. For reference these forts (and foundation dates) were:

Guryev (1645), Uralsk (1613), Orenburg (1743), Orsk (1735). Troitsk (1743), Petropavlovsk (1753), Omsk (1716), Pavlodar (1720), Semipalatinsk (1718), and Ust-Kamenogorsk (1720).

Uralsk was an old settlement of free Cossacks. Orenburg, Orsk, and Troitsk were founded as a result of the Bashkir War about 1740 and this section was called the Orenburg line. Orenburg was long the base from which Russia watched and tried to control the Kazakh steppe. The four eastern forts were along the Irtysh River. After China conquered Xinjiang in 1759, both empires had a few border posts near the current border.

== Khivan campaign of 1717 ==
In 1713, reports reached Peter the Great that gold deposits had been discovered in Yarkand, deep in the Dzungar Khanate. A large expedition was sent the following year to build a fort line to the region, though by 1716 the Dzungars had almost completely wiped out the force through siege. A secondary force was sent under the leadership of Alexander Bekovich-Cherkassky to the Khanate of Khiva in 1714, ostensibly to celebrate the accession of Shergazi Khan and establish trade relations, but in reality to find Yarkand and if it connected to the Caspian Sea. Cherkassky reported that there was a river, though a Khivan dam redirected from the Caspian to the Aral Sea.

Cherkassky was dispatched by Peter again in 1716, this time to construct a series of forts leading to Yarkand, destroy the reported dam, supply Russian trade ships traveling to India, and convince the Khivan Khan to subjugate himself to Russia. The expedition set out with 6,100 men, though the force was greatly depleted to construct and garrison three forts along the Caspian, and after hundreds had fallen ill due to the cold. In 1717, the expedition set out for Khiva with only 3,500 men, late in the season when the steppe became extremely hot. While they sent an envoy to Shergazi Khan claiming the force was peaceful, the khan had been warned of their intentions by the Kalmyks. The khan sent a force of 20,000 soldiers to attack the expedition, though the Russians repulsed it. The khan then offered to negotiate peace, but stated that the Russians would need to split into five smaller groups and housed separately since Khiva could not support them all. Cherkassky accepted, and after the Russian force split apart they were massacred. Cherkassky and his retinue were beheaded in front of the khan. The forts on the Caspian were abandoned, along with any plans for future expeditions.

== Conquest of the Kazakh Steppe ==
Approximate map of the jüzes Junior jüz Middle jüz Senior jüz

=== Subjugation of the Kazakh Khanate ===
The Kazakh Khanate was in a weak state following the death of Tauke Khan in 1715, causing central authority to devolve to the Khanate's three clan confederations known as jüzes. The collapse of the Khanate, combined with raids from neighboring peoples and pressure from the Russian Empire caused the jüzes to seek Russian protection by becoming subjects, swearing fealty and pay taxes to the Russian Empire. In 1730, the Khan of the Junior jüz, Abū'l-Khair Khan, sent an envoy to the Russian Empire formally requested subjugation of the Junior jüz to the Russian Empire. Empress Anna of Russia accepted this request, and soon after Alexey Ivanovich Tevkelev was sent to inform the jüz. Tevkelev met with the leaders of the Junior jüz on 10 October 1731, and officially incorporate the region into the Russian Empire. Soon after on 15 December 1731, Tevkelev and the leaders of the Junior jüz sent emissaries to Semeke Khan, leader of the Middle jüz, stating that he should be subjugated to the Russian Empire. Semeke Khan accepted, giving his oath of allegiance to the Empire. The leaders of the Senior jüz also attempted to become part of the Russian Empire, with Empress Anna of Russia confirming its admission in 1738.

Despite formally claiming suzerainty over the three jüzes by 1738, Russia did not have complete control over the Kazakh Steppe and its people for much of the following century. While the Russian government viewed the oath as a strict submission of Kazakhs to the Emperor, Kazakhs saw the oath as a loose and practical way to get protection. After swearing fealty, Abū'l-Khair Khan gave hostages and pay yasak to the Russian Empire. However, many Kazakh elders did not give allegiance to the Russian Empire, the Junior jüz often would not give hostages, and the Middle and Senior jüzes gave neither tax nor hostages. Kazakh sultans continued to engage in diplomacy with the Qing Empire well into the 1820s, the khan of the Middle jüz even offering his submission to the Qing Emperor in 1779. Additionally, the Senior jüz was so distant from the Russian Empire that it was difficult for the Russian Empire to incorporate it, with it even being subjugated by the Dzungar Khanate at one point. The Senior jüz was not fully subject to the Russian empire until 1846, around the conclusion of Kenesary's Rebellion (see below).

=== Russian consolidation ===
Fortress capitals of the okrugs by 1863.

Russia began to attempt to administrate the Kazakh Steppe in 1786, with the creation of the Orenburg Frontier Commission, a body of the Russian Ministry of Foreign Affairs. However, the Commission only extended into the Junior jüz. Authority in the steppe continued to dissolve, leading to a rise in traditional violence and raids on Russian fortresses. This, combined with the Russian governments concern for trade routes through the Kazakh Steppe led to significant political changes in the Khanate. In 1822, the Regulations for the Siberian Kirgiz was introduced, formally declaring Kazakhs inorodtsy of the Russian Empire, restricting the movement of Kazakhs, and creating tiers of administrative units in the Middle jüz. The top level of administration were four (Note: By 1863, the total number of okrugs grew to seven.) okrugs ruled by sultans, centered on a Russian fort, and policed by Cossacks. In 1824 the Charter on the Orenburg Kyrgyz was put into effect, extending the control of the Orenburg Frontier Commission, dissolving the Junior jüz, and further restricting the transhumance of regional pastoralists. While the Kazakh aristocracy maintained their positions through the administrative reforms, they lost much of the power that they once held. Despite Russian hopes of introducing stability to the region, the new administrative systems were unable to administer their subjects. While these reforms temporarily dampened the region's internal issues, they continued to grow with time, with anti-Russian sentiment spreading across the steppe.

=== Kenesary's Rebellion ===
Kenesary Qasymuly was a Kazakh sultan who sought to reduce Russian influence on the Kazakh people, and formally establish himself as Khan. His revolt began in 1837, with the destruction of a Russian fort at Aqtau. For the next several years he and his followers carried out periodic raids to capture livestock and hostages, which was met in turn by Cossack raids on Kazakhs. These retributive Russian raids were a source of food and supplies for local troops, but were largely ineffective at countering Kenesary and provoked resentment against the Russian Empire. Kenesary's raids also targeted Kazakhs, leading to them filing several petitions for Russian protection to the Orenburg Frontier Commission.

Cossack troops found Kenesary's aul in February 1844, capturing several hundred people and Kenesary's senior wife. While the two parties exchanged prisoners the following year, Kenesary did not halt his raids. In Autumn 1844, an expeditionary force of Russian troops and Kazakhs was launched to find Kenesary, though the mission led to the destruction of an innocent aul and was considered a failure. Governor-General of Orenburg Vladimir Obruchev determined that the raids would not end the rebellion, and instead a series of fortresses should be constructed deep in the steppe. A modified version of the proposal was accepted, and two permanent forts were constructed on the Turgay and Irgiz rivers. Obruchev successfully campaigned for a third, even larger and more remote, fort to be constructed in 1847 at the mouth of the Syr Darya, named Fort Raim. Russian forces continued to probe deeper into the steppe in search of Kenesary during 1846, causing several Kazakh tribal leaders to submit to the Russian Empire. While Kenesary was killed by Kyrgyz early the following year, Russian forces continued their march to the river Kapal to construct a fort. Despite crushing the rebellion, Russian control over the steppe remained loose.

== Khivan campaign of 1839 ==
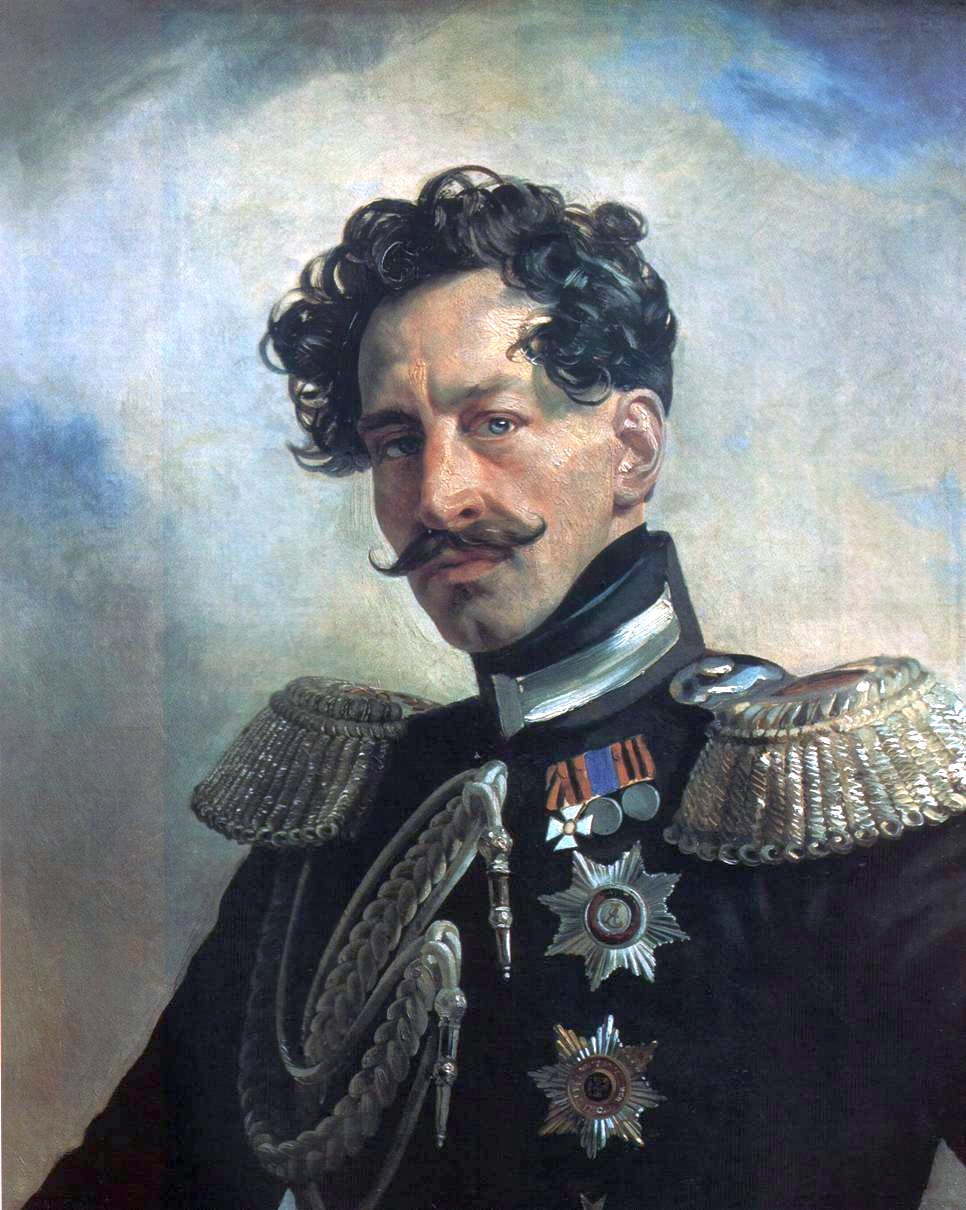
Orenburg military governor Vasily Perovsky in 1837

Beginning in the early 1800s, several proposals were raised for a punitive expedition against the Khanate of Khiva for several perceived slights. Khivan forces often raided Russian caravans, attempted to extract tax from Kazakhs that the Russians considered their citizens, and took Russians captive in border raids. (Note: The number of people captured by Khivans at the time was vastly exaggerated by Russia, and slave capturing was a common practice in the region, even done by Russian forces.) In 1804, the governor of Orenburg proposed an expedition to the Khanate, though it was sidelined due to other priorities. A diplomatic mission was sent in 1819 and returned safely, though without any agreement to release Russian captives from the Khanate. In 1831, the head of the Orenburg Frontier Commission wrote a memorandum on the issue of Russian slaves, promoting foreign minister Karl Nesselrode to propose a punitive expedition. Newly appointed governor of Orenburg Vasily Perovsky was also personally outraged by Khivan enslavement of Russians, writing another memorandum to the Russian government where he stated that they must take up a civilizing mission against Khiva, similarly to other European powers. Tsar Nicholas I strongly agreed with Perovsky's memorandum, giving the governor power to take action against Khiva. In 1836, 350 Khivan merchants were detained outside of Orenburg and trade with Khiva was halted to the surprise of Khivan Khan Allah Kuli. Allah Kuli sent slaves back to the Russians in an attempt to negotiate, though these gestures were seen as delaying tactics by the Russians, and Perovsky had no interest in diplomacy. A committee composed of Perovsky, Nesselrode, Alexander Chernyshyov was formed in March 1839, which created a plan to replace the Khan with his younger brother, and modeled the expedition off of the colonial conquests other imperial powers were engaging in.

The expedition was unprecedented in Russian military history, it had never before sent such a large force so deep into Central Asia across such harsh terrain. As a result, Perovsky greatly underestimated the number of camels needed for transportation to only be 1,712. While he eventually increased that estimate to a more realistic 12,000, Russian forces struggled to requisition camels from native Kazakhs in time. While the camels were able to carry most essential goods and provisions, they were not able to carry water in any sufficient quantity. Perovsky took the risk of launching the expedition in the harsh winter, when they would be able to drink from the snow. However, the camels were extremely vulnerable to cold and damp weather, a weakness that Russian forces attempted to mitigate by supplying the animals with leather jackets before setting out.

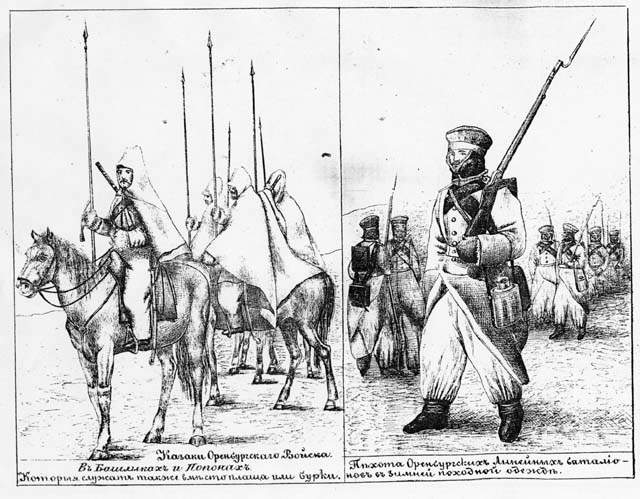
An 1874 illustration by Mikhail Ignatievich Ivanin depicting the Cossacks (left) and infantry (right) of the Khvian campaign in their winter clothing

The first of the Russian columns departed in November 1839, and it was not long before the expedition encountered issues. By mid-December, a fifth of the camels were unfit to carry their loads, and about 2,000 had died. The column halted for a month to try and recover the camels' strength while the weather improved, though a break did not come. On 13 December, the expedition encountered Khivan forces for the first and only time during the campaign, when a small Russian garrison stationed in Aq Bulaq was attacked by Khivian cavalry. The Khivans were driven off by musket and artillery fire with no loss to the garrison, and then attacked a Russian advance column who also managed to drive them off with little casualties. While these Khivan troops attempted to convince the Kazakh and Tatar camel drivers to defect, they remained loyal to the Russian army. However, when the main columns prepared to depart for the difficult journey from Aty-Yakshi to Aq Bulaq, a Kazakh crowd formed protesting the decision to advance through such difficult conditions, and crying that they should return to their homes. The crowd dispersed after two ringleaders of the protest were shot, and the column's advance continued in January. Camels began to die in the thousands, and only three weeks after leaving Aty-Yakshi, Perovsky ordered a retreat back to where they came from. The Khivans attempted to engage Russia forces in March, though then they arrived at Aq Bulaq they found the fortress abandoned. Russian forces began to return in July 1840, with 1,054 soldiers having died during the expedition.

== The Syr Darya line ==
=== Establishment of Fort Raim ===
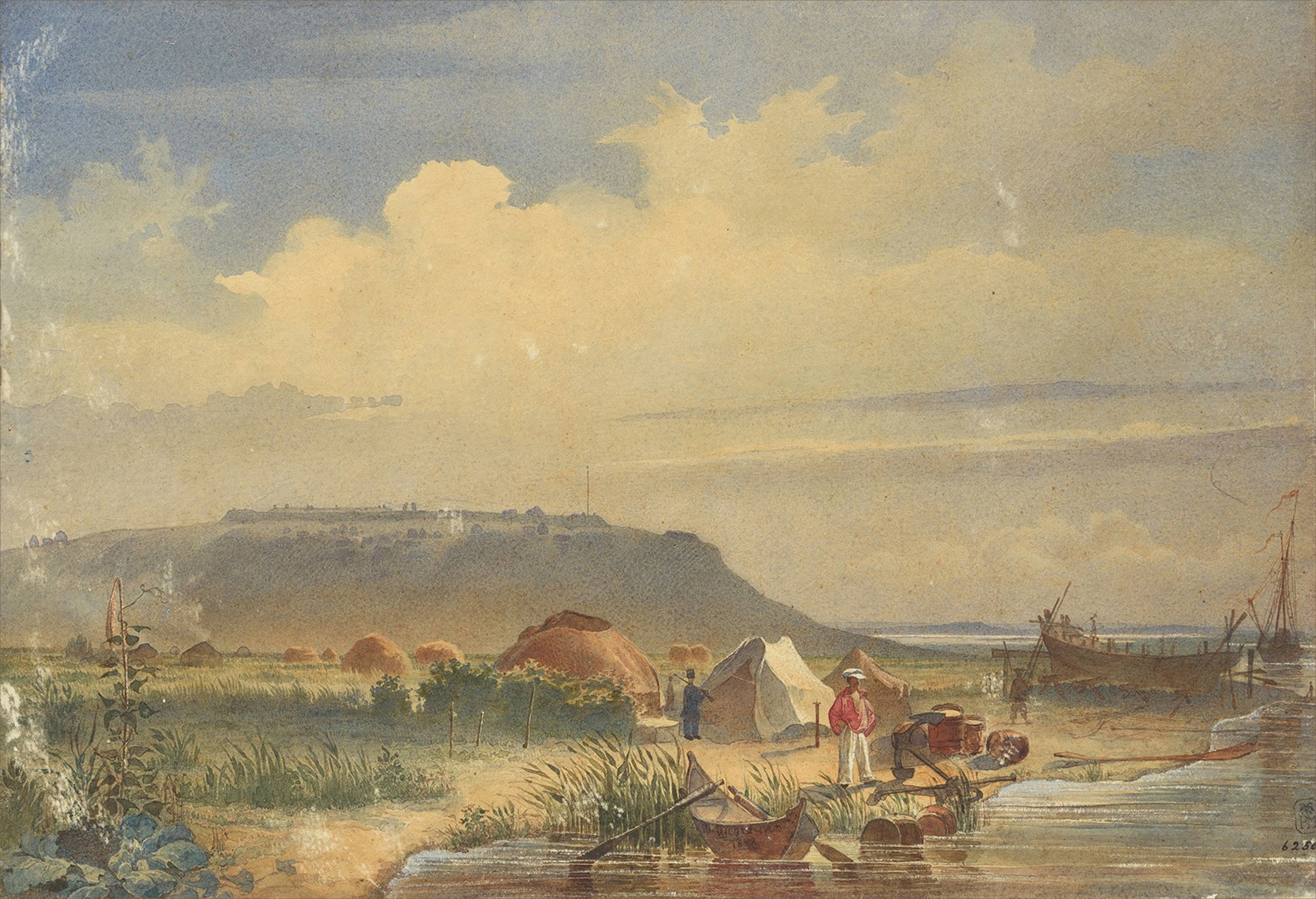
Fort Raim (on hill in background), June 1848, by Taras Shevchenko

While the failure of the 1839 Khivan campaign ruled out long distance punitive expeditions as a tool of control against the southern Central Asians, Russian governors still felt the need to extend control south due to disruption of caravan traffic and challenges to their sovereignty over the Kazakhs. In the 1830s, the Khanate of Kokand began to expand northward, constructing fortresses to trade, and to collect zakat from Kazakh herds. Kenesary's Rebellion further disrupted Russian control in the region, and prompted a wave of fort construction in the inner Kazakh steppe. Fort Raim, built during the rebellion on the mouth of the Syr Darya at the Aral Sea, served to control the river and host expeditions. However, the fort's construction worsened Russian relations with Khiva and Kokand. Raiders from the Central Asian states attacked Russian forces, leading to a Russian punitive expedition that expelled a Khivan garrison. Fears of attacks did not lessen, with rumors emerging among Russian regional command of impending attacks on Fort Raim.

=== Capture of Ak-Mechet ===
By 1852, the Russian administration committed to suppressing Kokand's influence in the region, with the Tsar authorizing a line of forts be constructed to connect the Siberian line to the Syr Darya. The river was seen by the Russian government as a solid line on which to establish a new frontier, and efforts were made to move Russian troops to a sheltered area upstream. However, the commander of Ak-Mechet, the Kokand Khanate's most influential and critical northern stronghold, warned a Russian surveying party that advancing further along the Syr Darya would be met with force. Vasily Perovsky, serving once again as the Military Governor of Orenburg, responded to these threats by dispatching an expedition to Ak-Mechet under Colonel Blaramberg. The goal of the expedition was to survey Ak-Mechet and possibly destroy the fort under certain circumstances. (Note: Sources variously report that the attack was performed fully at Blaramberg's initiative, that it was ordered in the case of Kokandi attack, or that it was ordered if the fort was on the right bank of the Syr Darya.) Blaramberg attempted to attack the fortress upon reaching it, but found his weapons were unable to penetrate the fortress, and retreated at a loss of several men killed and wounded.

The Russian plan of siege and assault against Ak-Mechet

Russian leadership up to the Tsar himself were alarmed by the failure of Blaramberg's expedition, and resolved to attack again when victory would be certain. In January 1853, the Tsar accepted a plan by Perovsky wherein four forts would be built on the Syr Darya River to establish a stronger, more advanced frontier from which they could influence the southern khanates and protect their territory. While the forts were primarily strategic, Perovsky optimistically argued that protecting caravans and increased tax on Kazakhs would offset the project's enormous cost. (Note: Initial construction was estimated to be 173,000 ₽, with an annual upkeep of 330,000 ₽.) One of the fortresses would be built over Ak-Mechet, necessitating a military operation that would also restore Russian prestige after the failure of last year.

Perovky's force departed June of that year. A flotilla and Kazakh camel caravan was used to transport supplies and troops along the Syr-Darya, Kazakhs also providing crucial service as reconnaissance and guides. Despite the march to Ak-Mechet comprising hot, barren terrain with large swarms of mosquitos and horse flies, the expedition suffered no significant losses. The siege was conducted extremely cautiously, stretching out over several weeks as extensive mines were dug to avoid a bloody frontal assault. The mines were sprung on the 28th, and after a short Russian assault the fort was captured. While the Russians suffered few casualties, a large majority of the Kokandi defenders were killed, most survivors being women and children.

Khudayar Khan, who had only recently regained power after a coup, lost much of his legitimacy because of the defeat. He sent two expeditions to recapture the fort soon after, both of which were strongly repulsed. Kokand continued to launch small attacks and raids well into the 1860s.

The capture of the fort was a seminal point in the Russian conquest of Central Asia. It was the first settlement to be captured by Russia, and the first settlement to have its name Russified, being renamed to Fort Perovsky in honor of Vasily Perovsky.

=== Establishment of the line ===
Forts of the Syr-Darya Line before 1855 (Note: Does not include Fort No. 3, which was abandoned shortly after construction.)

In September 1853, three fortresses named Forts No. 1, 2, and 3 (Note: Forts No. 1 and 2 were often called Kazalinsk and Karmakchi respectively.) were constructed between Fort Raim and Fort Perovsky, though Fort No. 3 was quickly abandoned. Fort Raim was also abandoned in 1855 due to its redundancy.

The forts were intended to become flourishing settlements, serving as military strongholds, trade hubs, and intelligence centers. Fort Perovsky was rebuilt from 1858–1859, though it and the other fortresses suffered from extremely poor building quality, compounded by harsh weather. Logs had to be imported from north of Orenburg, and quickly rotted. As such, many of the buildings were built from mudbricks, and only lasted for a few years before crumbling. By 1857, Fort Perovsky was surrounded by temporary structures, and inside was filled with collapsed buildings. Sustaining the fortresses was also extremely challenging. Despite hopes to irrigate the land and encourage nomadic Kazakhs to become farmers, grain could not be grown at a rate to sustain even the garrisons, and food had to be imported or purchased at high prices.

The fortresses did not become significant centers of trade, located outside of the Russian customs boundary in the depopulated steppe. Little attempt was made at all to establish a civilian administration, with most efforts focused on collecting intelligence in the region. Russia often questioned cross-country traders to gather generally reliable and timely information on Kokand's military preparations, though information on regional politics tended to be vague. Efforts to curb raids were less effective, groups often successfully captured livestock and caravans, despite punitive expeditions sent out by Russia.

=== Expansion of the line ===
After Russia's defeat in the Crimean War and significant victories in the Caucasian War, the focus of Russian government turned to the security of the Central Asian front. In 1848, a proposal was raised to connect the Syr Darya line to the Siberian line by advancing south and capturing Tashkent, ideally establishing a solid border with Kokand and ending the southern raids. After extensive surveys of the Chu region, a version of this plan in which the Siberian line would be expanded westwards by capturing Kokandi fortresses was approved by the Tsar. There was significant debate on what to do with the Syr Darya line in light of the advances, with proposals being raised within committees and via memorandums. Ideas included maintaining the status quo, cutting their losses and abandoning the Syr Darya line entirely, expanding along the fertile Amu Darya to supply the Syr Darya line, and advancing as far as Tashkent. These plans focused on cutting expenses and increasing security, though the best way to do this was highly disputed.

== Eastern approach to Central Asia ==
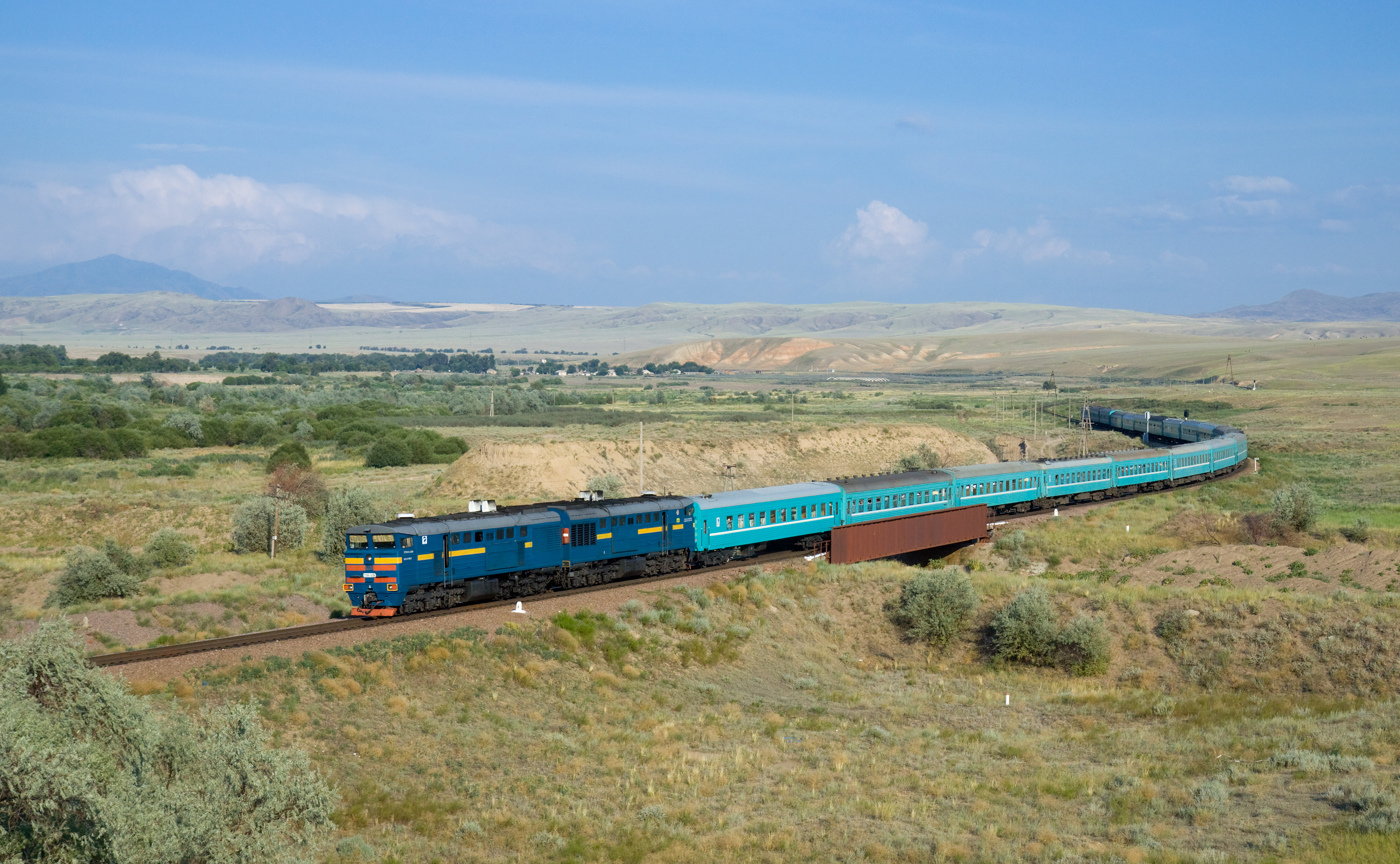
A train crossing the Kazakh Steppe

In 1847–1864, the Russians crossed the eastern Kazakh steppe and built a line of forts in the irrigated area along the northern Kyrgyz border. In 1864–1868, they moved south, conquered Tashkent and Samarkand, confined the Khanate of Kokand to the Ferghana valley and made Bokhara a protectorate. This was the main event of the conquest. Our sources do not say why an eastern approach was chosen, but an obvious guess is that irrigation made it possible to move armies without crossing steppe or desert. This was important when transport required grass-fed horses and camels. We are not told how Russia supplied an army this far east, or if this was a problem. It is not clear why a forward policy was now adopted. It seems that different officials had different opinions and much was decided by local commanders and the luck of the battlefield. All sources report Russian victories over greatly superior forces with kill ratios approaching ten to one. Even if enemy numbers are exaggerated it seems clear that Russian weapons and tactics were now superior to the traditional Asian armies that they faced. All sources mention breechloading rifles without further explanation. Berdan rifles are mentioned without giving numbers. MacGahan, in his account of the Khivan campaign, contrasts explosive artillery to traditional cannonballs. Artillery and rifles could often keep Russian soldiers out of reach of hand weapons.

=== Advance from the northeast ===
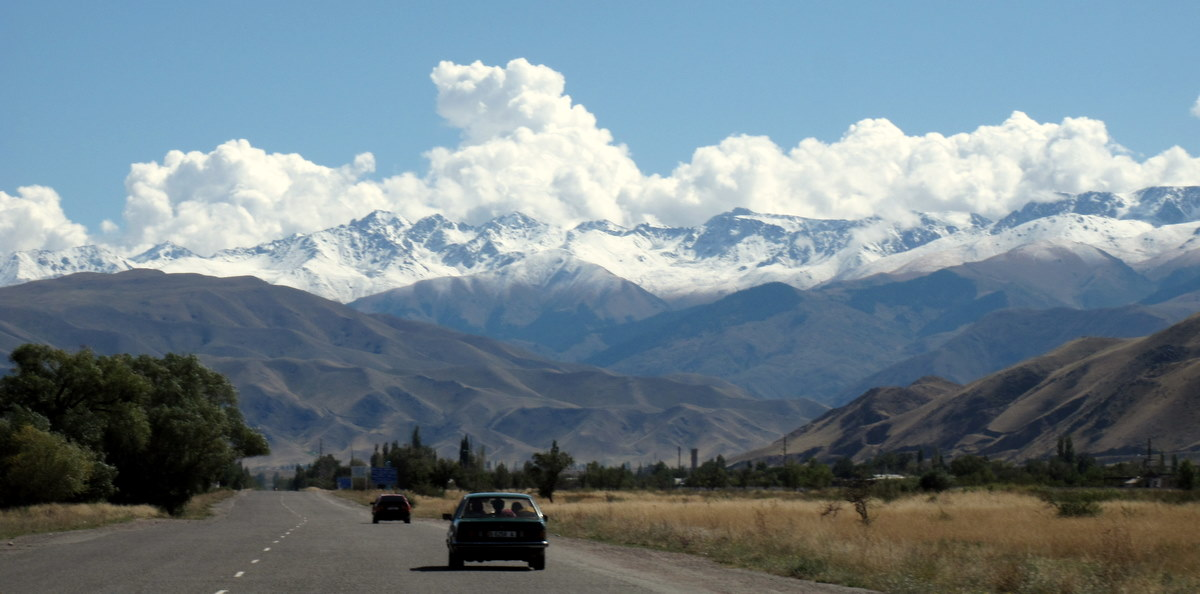
Mountain steppe boundary near Bishkek

The eastern end of the Kazakh steppe was called Semirechye by the Russians. South of this, along the modern Kyrgyz border, the Tien Shan mountains extend about 640 km (400 mi) to the west. Water coming down from the mountains provides irrigation for a line of towns and supports a natural caravan route. South of this mountain projection is the densely populated Ferghana Valley ruled by the Khanate of Kokand. South of Ferghana is the Turkestan Range and then the land the ancients called Bactria. West of the northern range is the great city of Tashkent and west of the southern range is Tamerlane's old capital Samarkand.

Russian expansion along the mountains of Kyrgyzstan 1854–1864

In 1847, Kopal was founded southeast of Lake Balkash. In 1852 Russia crossed the Ili River and met Kazakh resistance and next year destroyed the Kazakh fort of Tuchubek. In 1854, they founded Fort Vernoye (Almaty) within sight of the mountains. Vernoye is about 800 km (500 mi) south of the Siberian Line. Eight years later, in 1862, Russia took Tokmak (Tokmok) and Pishpek (Bishkek). Russia placed a force at the Kastek pass to block a counterattack from Kokand. The Kokandis used a different pass, attacked an intermediate post, Kolpakovsky rushed from Kastek and completely defeated a much larger army. In 1864, Chernayev took command of the east, led 2500 men from Siberia, and captured Aulie-Ata (Taraz). Russia was now near the west end of the mountain range and about halfway between Vernoye and Ak-Mechet.

In 1851, Russia and China signed the Treaty of Kulja to regulate trade along what was becoming a new border. In 1864, they signed the Treaty of Tarbagatai which approximately established the current Chinese-Kazakh border. The Chinese thereby renounced any claims to the Kazakh steppe, to the extent that they had any.

=== Advance up the Syr Darya ===
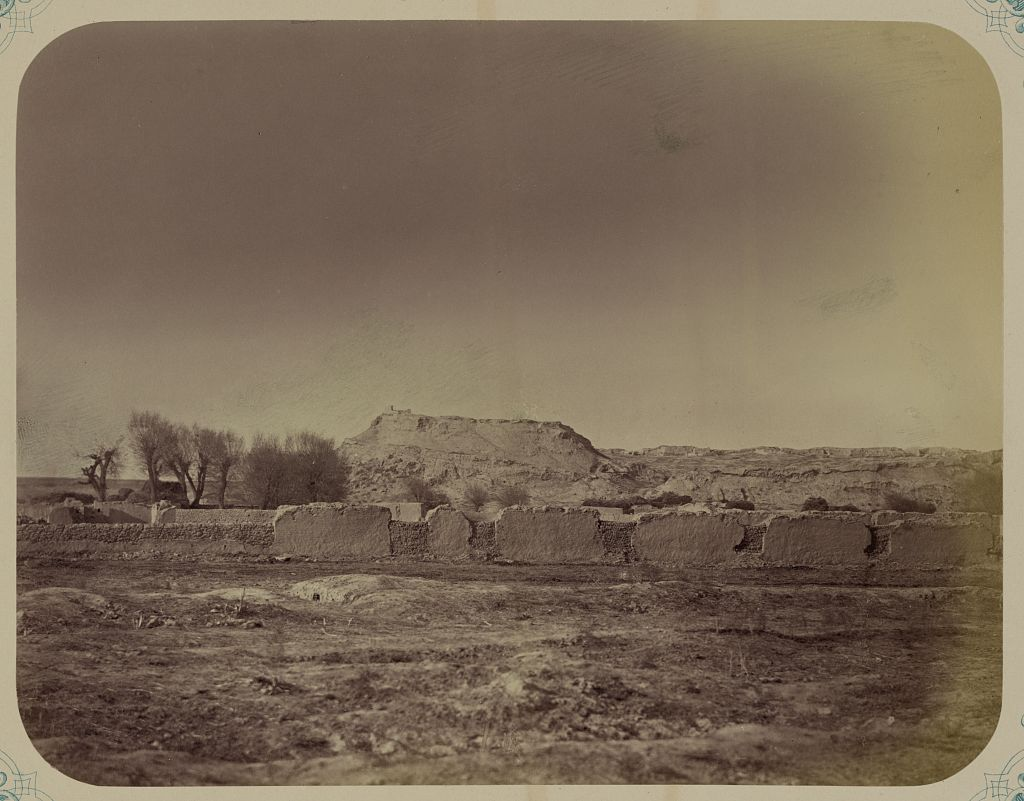
The ruins of Yany-Kurgan - captured and destroyed by Alexander Debu in September, 1861. This photo was taken by Mikhail Terentyev between 1871 and 1872.

Meanwhile, Russia was advancing southeast up the Syr Darya from Ak-Mechet. In 1859, Dzhulek (Note: The location is uncertain, possibly the modern Zhilek.) was taken from Kokand. In 1861, a Russian fort was built at Dzhulek. In September 1861, Alexander Debu led an army from Fort Dzhulek to Yany-Kurgan (present day Zhanakorgan). Following a quick siege, Debu captured and destroyed Yany-Kurgan. The destruction of Yany-Kurgan deprived the Kokand of a strategic lodgement in the region. The small, but significant, siege opened a pathway for the Russians to launch more campaigns and capture more cities.

In 1862, Chernyaev reconnoitered the river as far as Hazrat-i-Turkestan and captured the small oasis of Suzak about 105 km (65 mi) east of the river. In June 1864, Veryovkin took Hazrat-i-Turkestan from Kokand. He hastened surrender by bombarding the famous mausoleum. Two Russian columns met in the 240 km (150 mi) gap between Hazrat and Aulie-Ata, thereby completing the Syr-Darya Line.

== Conquest of Kokand and Bukhara ==
=== Battle of Ican ===
In 1864, Alimkul tried to raid the territory of the Russians and recapture the occupied lands, but at Ican his army got in front of a hundred Cossacks. Alimkul's attempts to defeat the small Cossack army failed. Despite suffering heavy casualties, the Cossacks managed to break through Alimkul's encirclement and make it to safety. As a result of this failure, Alimkul retreated.

=== Occupation of Tashkent ===
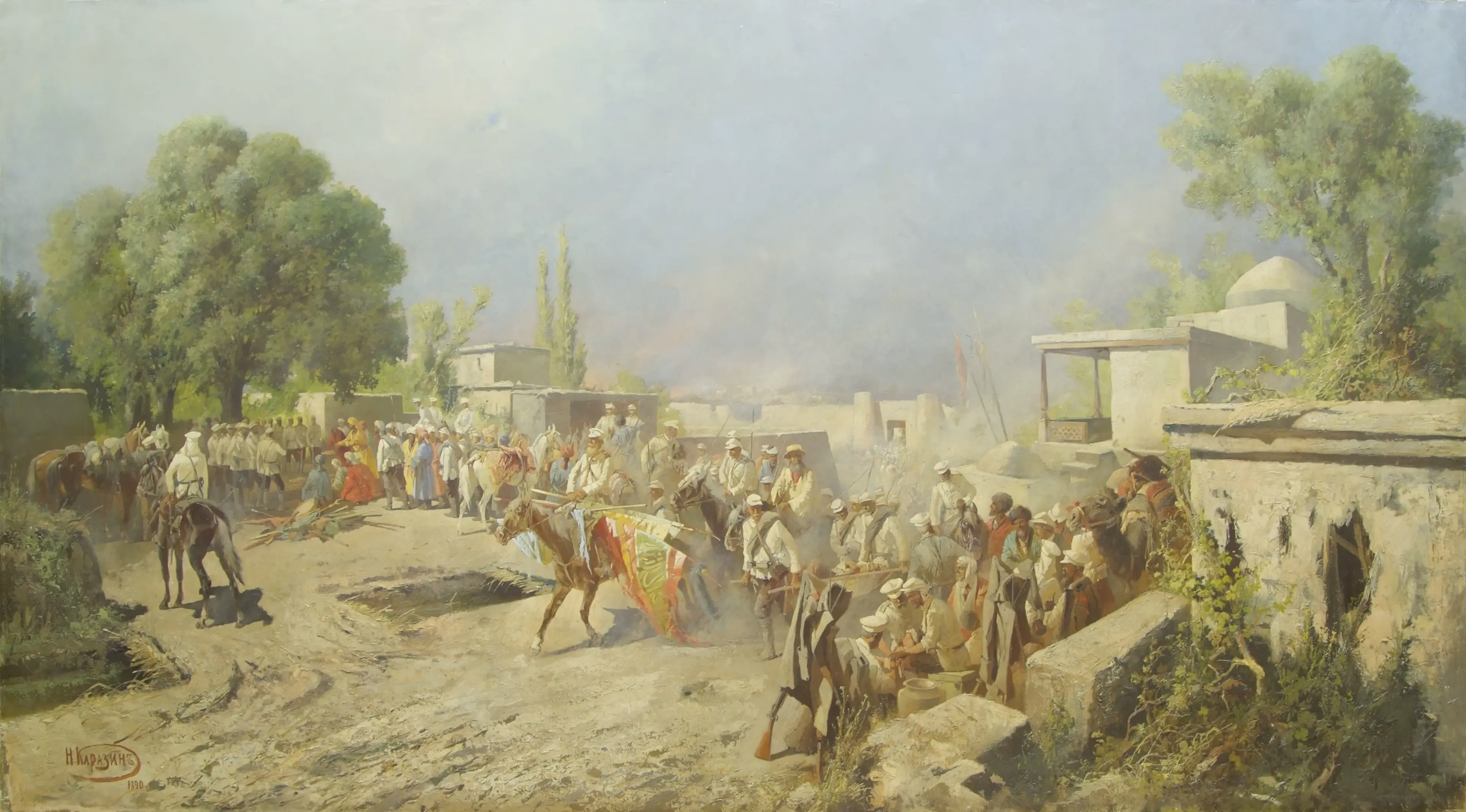
The capture of Tashkent by General Chernyaev, 1890, by Nikolay Karazin

About 80 km (50 mi) south of the new line was Chimkent (Shymkent) which belonged to Kokand. He failed to take Shymkent in his first attack and retreated, but was able to take it in his next attack. On 15 October, he suddenly appeared before Tashkent, failed to take it by sudden assault and retreated to Chimkent. Kokand then tried and failed to re-take Hazrat-i-Turkestan. In April 1865, Chernayev made a second attack on Tashkent. Unable to take such a large place (it was said to have a garrison of 30,000) he occupied the town's water supply at Niazbek. The Kokand Regent Alim Kuli arrived with 6,000 more troops and almost defeated the Russians, but was killed in the fight. The inhabitants now offered to submit to the Emir of Bokhara in return for assistance. About 21 June, a party of Bokharans entered the town and more Bokharan troops were on the move. In this critical position, Chernayev determined to risk a storm. At 3 a.m. on 27 June, Captain Abramov scaled the wall and opened the Kamelan Gate, advanced along the wall and opened a second gate while another party took the Kokand gate. That day and the next there was constant street fighting, but on the morning of the 29th a deputation of elders offered surrender.

=== Campaign of 1866 ===
The Bokhara was now involved in the war. In February 1866, Chernayev crossed the Hungry Steppe to the Bokharan fort of Jizzakh. Finding the task impossible, he withdrew to Tashkent followed by Bokharans who were soon joined by Kokandis. At this point Chernayev was recalled for insubordination and replaced by Romanovsky. Romanovsky prepared to attack Bohkara, the Amir moved first, the two forces met on the plain of Irjar. Note: Near Kattakurgan, Uzbekistan about halfway between Jizzakh and Bokhara. The Bukharians scattered, losing most of their artillery, supplies and treasures and more than 1,000 killed, while the Russians lost 12 wounded. Instead of following him, Romanovsky turned east and took Khujand, thus closing the mouth of the Fergana Valley. The losses of the Kokand residents were more than 2,500 thousand killed, 130 Russians killed and wounded. Then he moved west and took Ura-Tepe (Note: Apparently Istaravshan about 32 km (20 mi) south of the middle 160 km (100 mi) the line between Jizzakh and Kozhent.) and Jizzakh from Bukhara. During the capture of Jizzak, the Bukharians lost 6,000 killed and 3,000 prisoners, as well as all the artillery. In total, during the campaign of 1866, the Russian troops lost 500 people killed and wounded, while the natives lost more than 12,000 killed. Defeats forced Bukhara to start peace talks.

=== 1868 campaign ===
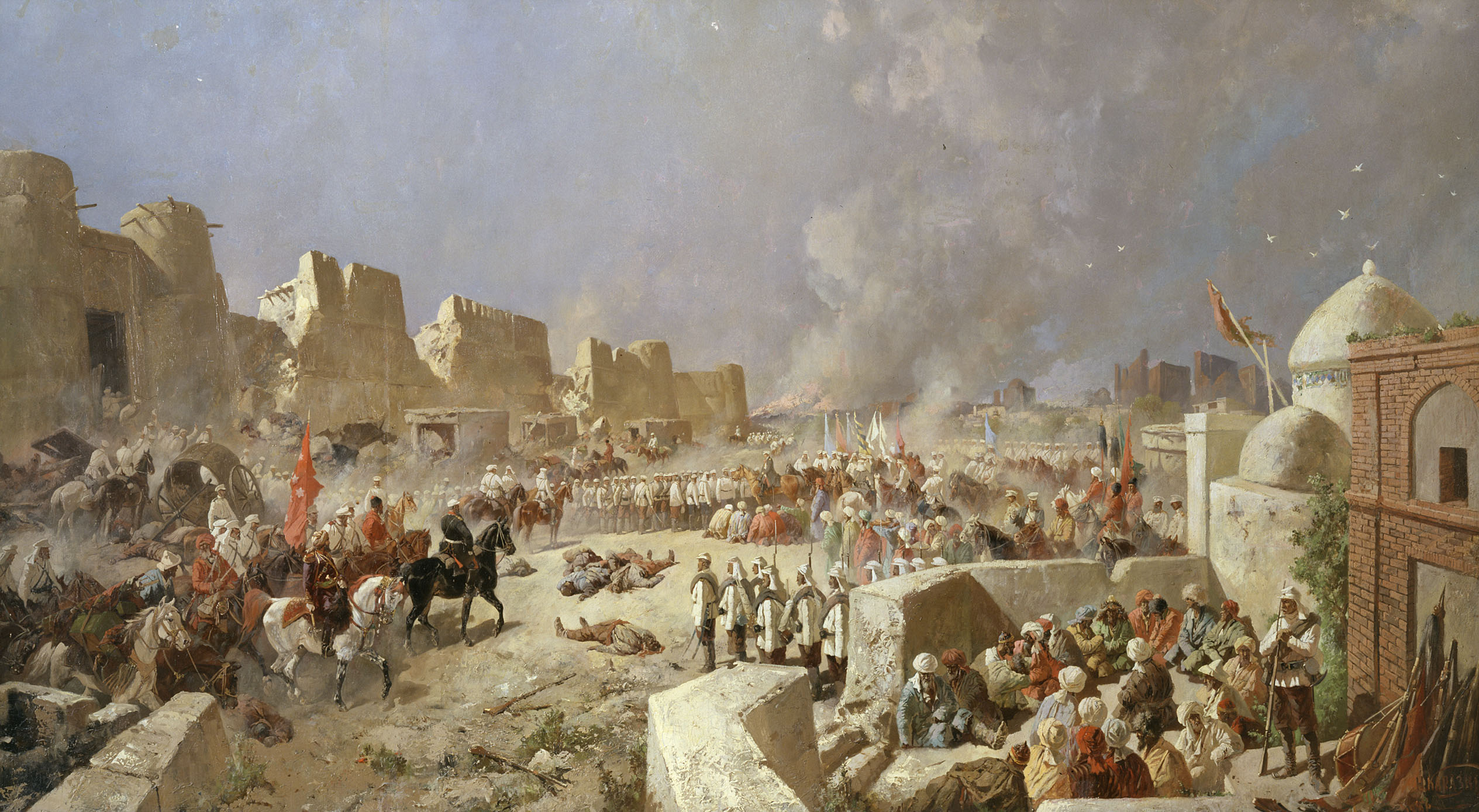
Russian troops taking Samarkand, 8 June 1868, 1888, by Nikolay Karazin. This painting depicts the main Russian army lifting the siege of Samarkand.

In July 1867, a new Province of Turkestan was created and placed under General von Kaufmann with its headquarters at Tashkent. The Bukharan Emir did not fully control his subjects, there were random raids and rebellions. The Emir also did not ratify the peace treaty in time. In response, Kaufmann decided to hasten matters by marching towards Samarkand. After marching 75 kilometers, he defeated a Bukharan army on the heights of Chupan-Ata near Samarkand, the Emir retreated and the city surrendered without resisting (May 1868). The Russian army spent the entirety of May trying to locate the Emir and his army. In late May, Kaufmann left a garrison in Samarkand as he marched towards Bukhara to defeat the Emir in an open battle. (Note: Shahrisabz, Katti-Kurgan, Hussein Bek of Urgut, Omar Bek of Chilek, Jura Bek, Baba Bek, and others.)

On 2 June, the same day the Battle of Zerabulak took place, the garrison in Samarkand was besieged by a large army of different tribes. The besieging army attempted to take back Samarkand. Over the course of six days, the small Russian garrison defended in the city's citadel. In some instances, the garrison was close to being overrun. Despite suffering heavy casualties and running low on water, the garrison successfully held out until the main Russian army returned to lift the siege. The siege helped the Russian Empire to secure Samarkand. Not only was Samarkand a historically and a religiously important city in the region, but the city also controlled the region's water resources. The loss of Samarkand forced the Emir to sue for peace.

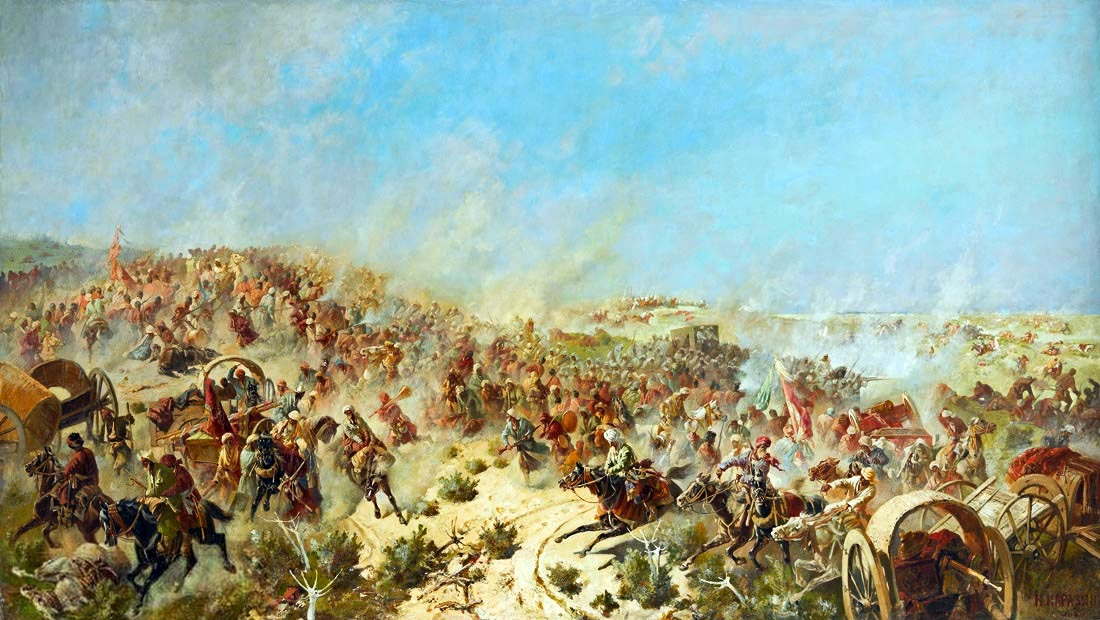
Battle of Zerabulak, a painting by Nikolay Karazin. In this battle, the Emir was decisively defeated.

On 2 June 1868, in a decisive battle on the Zerabulak heights, the Russians defeated the main forces of the Emir, losing less than 100 people, while the Bukhara army lost from 3,500 to 10,000. Having lost Samarkand and his army, Emir Muzaffar sued for peace. On 5 July 1868, a peace treaty was signed. The Emirate of Bukhara lost Samarkand and remained a semi-independent vassal until the Russian revolution. The Khanate of Kokand had lost its western territory, was confined to the Ferghana valley and surrounding mountains and remained independent until 1876. According to the Bregel's Atlas, if nowhere else, in 1870 the now-vassal Emirate of Bukhara expanded east and annexed that part of Bactria enclosed by the Turkestan Range, the Pamir Plateau, and the Afghan border.

== Consolidation of the Caspian ==
Russian forts on the east side of the Caspian

Russia now held an approximately triangular area bounded by the eastern mountains and the vassal Khanate of Bokhara along most of the Oxus. The southern point was about 1,600 km (1,000 mi) south of Siberia, 1,600 km (1,000 mi) southeast of Orenburg, and 1,900 km (1,200 mi) southeast of the supply bases on the Volga. The next step was to turn this triangle into a rectangle by moving east across the Caspian Sea from the Caucasus. The Caucasus held many troops left over from the Russian conquest of the Caucasus but the Viceroy of the Caucasus had so far not been active in Turkestan. The Caucasus has a fairly dense population but the east side of the Caspian is desert with significant population only in the oases of Khiva and along the Kopet Dag and at Merv in the south. The main events were the defeat of Khiva in 1873, the conquest of the Turkomans in 1881, the annexation of Merv in 1884 and the Panjdeh area in 1885.

For reference, these were the Russian bases on the north and east side of the Caspian:

- Astrakhan (1556–): at the mouth of the Volga River with connections to the rest of Russia
- Guryev (1645–): a small place at the mouth of the Ural River
- Novo-Aleksandrovsky (1834–1846): a shallow port, overlooking Dead Kultuk Bay, that was soon abandoned as the local climate was too inhospitable
- Alexandrovsk (1846–): important at this time but not later
- Kenderli (?1873): a temporary base
- Krasnovodsk (1869–): the best port and later headquarters of the Transcaspian Oblast and start of the Trans-Caspian railway
- Chikishlyar (1871–?): a beach rather than a port
- Ashuradeh (1837–?): a fort and naval station on land claimed by Persia

== Khivan campaign of 1873 ==
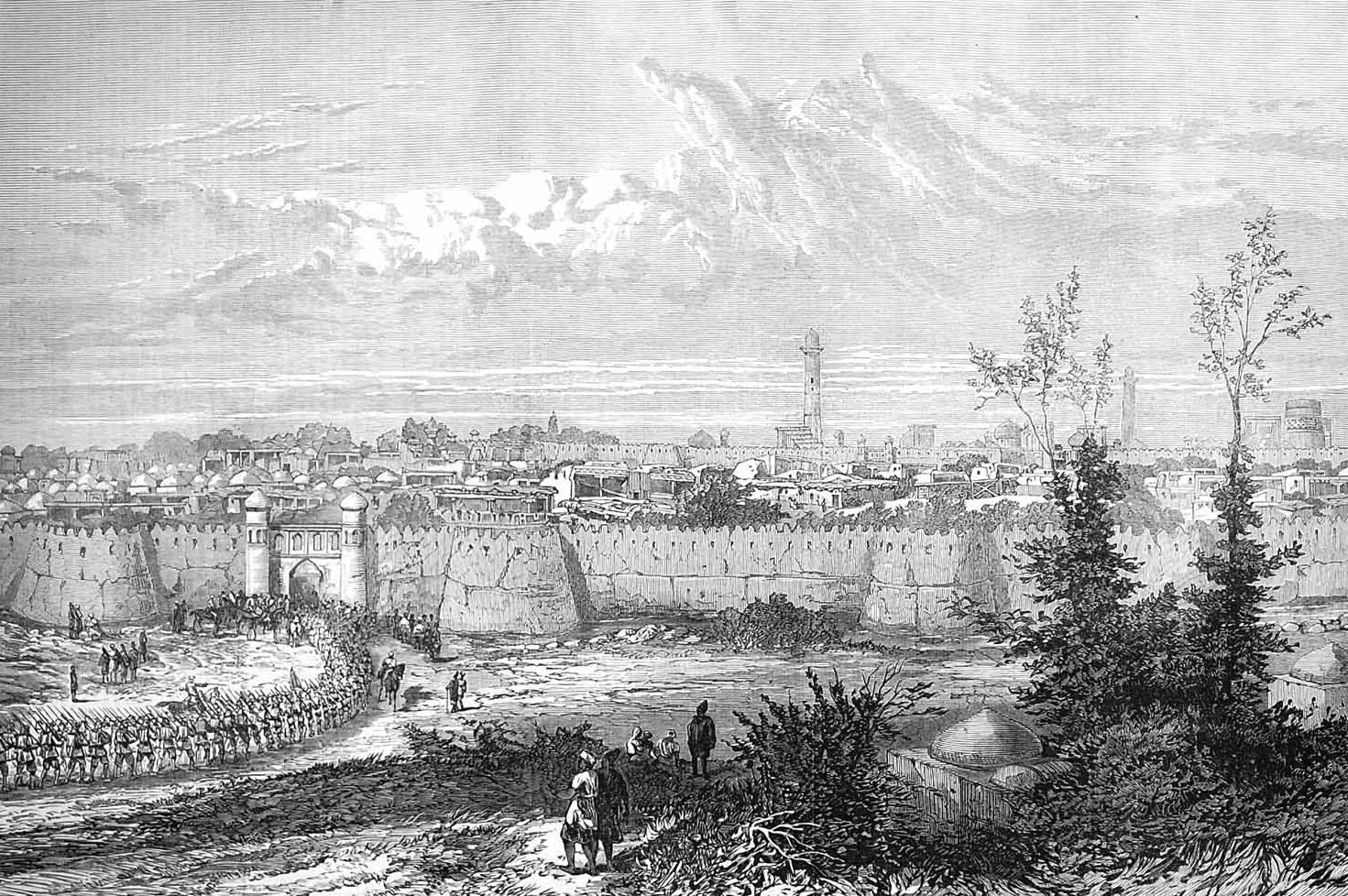
Russians entering Khiva in 1873

The decision to attack Khiva was made in December 1872. Khiva was an oasis surrounded by several hundred kilometres of desert. The Russians could easily defeat the Khivan army if they could move enough troops across the desert. The place was attacked from five directions. Kaufmann marched west from Tashkent and was joined by another army coming south from Aralsk. They met in the desert, ran short of water, abandoned part of their supplies and reached the Oxus in late May. Veryovkin left from Orenburg, had little difficulty moving along the west side of the Aral Sea and reached the northwest corner of the delta in mid-May. He was joined by Lomakin who had a hard time crossing the desert from the Caspian. Markozov started from Chikishlyar, ran short of water and was forced to turn back. Kaufmann crossed the Oxus, fought a few easy battles, and on 4 June, the Khan sued for peace. Meanwhile, Veryovkin, who was out of contact with Kaufmann, crossed the delta and attacked the city walls of Khiva until he was called off by Kaufmann. The Khanate of Khiva became a Russian protectorate and remained so until the Russian Revolution.

== Annexation of the Kokand Khanate ==
In 1875, the Kokand Khanate rebelled against Russian rule. Kokand commanders Abdurakhman and Pulat bey seized power in the khanate and began military operations against the Russians. By July 1875, most of the Khan's army and much of his family had deserted to the rebels, so he fled to the Russians at Kojent along with a million British pounds of treasure. Kaufmann invaded the Khanate on 1 September, fought several battles and entered the capital on 10 September 1875. In October he transferred command to Mikhail Skobelev. Russian troops under the command of Skobelev and Kaufmann defeated the rebels at the Battle of Makhram. In 1876, the Russians freely entered Kokand, the leaders of the rebels were executed, and the khanate was abolished. Fergana Oblast was created in its place.

== Conquest of Transcaspia ==
Conquest of Transcaspia 1879–1885
=Russian fort; =Khanate
The Kopet Dagh Mountains run from beyond Geok Tepe northwest toward Krasnovodsk

Transcaspia remained unconquered. The area corresponded to the Karakum Desert and was inhabited by Turkmen desert nomads. Irrigation supported a settled population along the Amu Darya in the northeast and along the north slope of the Kopet Dag mountains in the southwest. East of the Kopet Dag two rivers, the Murghab and Tejen, flow north from Afghanistan, supporting the oases of Tejen and Merv. The semi-sedentary population would drive their flocks out into the desert in spring and fall. The Turkomans had no organized state. Some served as mercenaries for Khiva. They habitually raided Persia and sold the resulting slaves in the Khiva slave market. Khiva and Bukhara were known as the major centers of slave trade in Central Asia for centuries. They also bred desert-adapted horses that could usually outrun anything the Cossacks had. Unlike the rather antiquated armies of the Khanates, the Turkomans were good raiders and horsemen, but they could do little against the Russians' modern weapons and explosive artillery. As usual, the main problem was moving men and supplies across the desert.

=== First battle of Geok Tepe ===
Lazarev landed a large force at Chikishlyar and began moving men and supplies up the Atrek River. He died suddenly and Lomakin took command. Lomakin crossed the Kopet Dagh with too few men, made an incompetent attack on Geok Tepe and was forced to retreat. The warlike Teke put up resistance Russian observers assessed as "worthy of the best European armies", proof of that being the heavy losses, over 25 percent, the Russians suffered in combat. Russian officers additionally noted that the Turkmen position was "fortified in an exemplary manner, according to all the rules of modern fortification".

=== Second battle of Geok Tepe ===
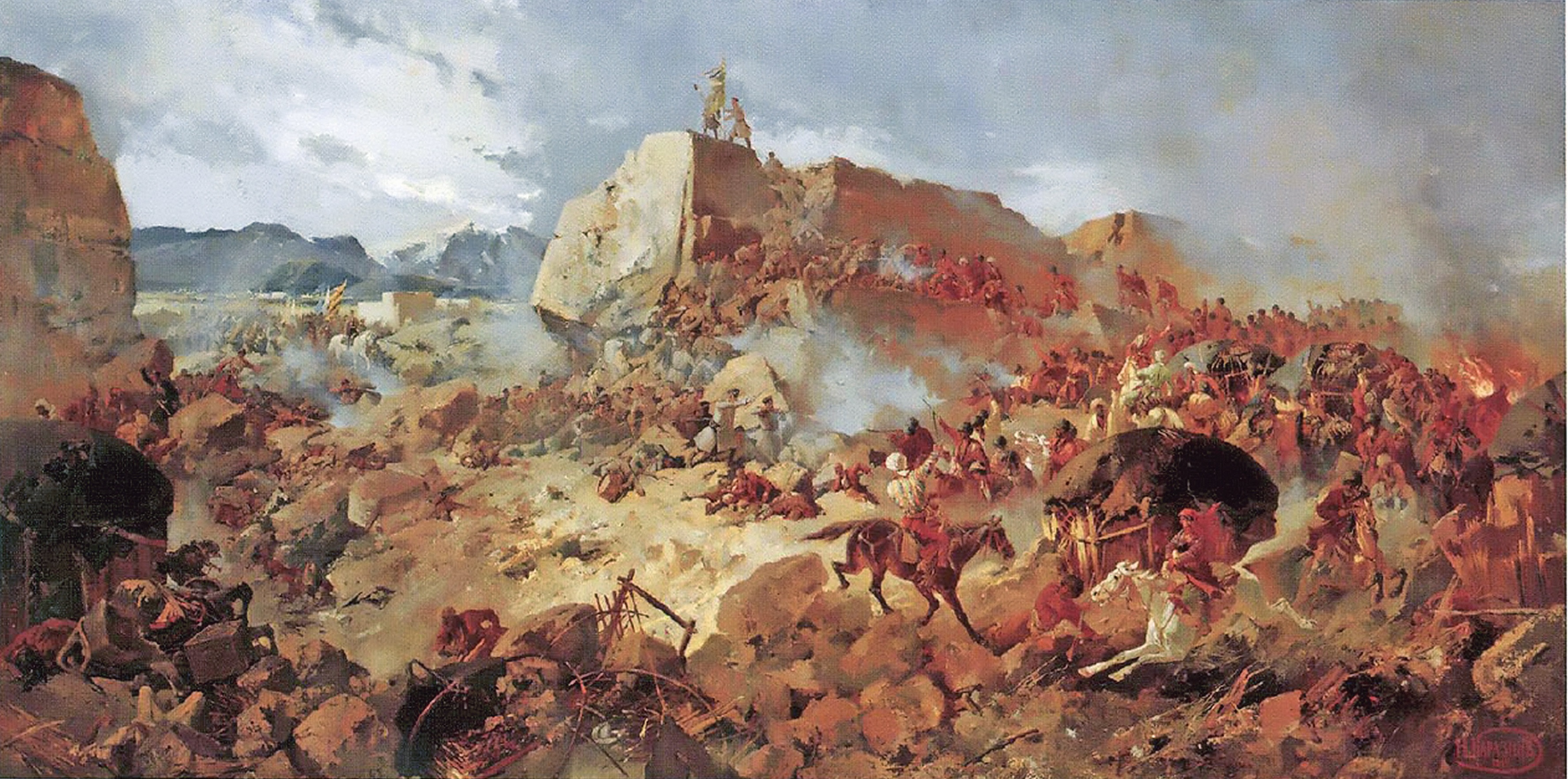
Siege of Geok Tepe, c. late 1800s, Nikolay Karazin

Skobelev was put in command in March 1880. He spent most of the summer and fall moving men and supplies from Chikishlyar to the north side of the Kopet Dag. In December, he marched southwest, besieged Geok Tepe for a month and took it by detonating a mine to breach the wall. At least 14,000 Tekes were killed. A week later, he occupied Ashgabat 40 km (25 mi) southeast, but could go no farther. In May 1881, the occupied area was annexed as the Transcaspian Oblast. The eastern boundary of the oblast was undefined.

=== Annexation of Merv ===
The Trans-Caspian Railway reached Kyzyl Arbat at the northwest end of the Kopet Dag in mid-September 1881. From October through December, Lessar surveyed the north side of the Kopet Dag and reported that there would be no problem building a railway along it. From April 1882, he examined the country almost to Herat and reported that were no military obstacles between the Kopet Dag and Afghanistan. Nazirov or Nazir Beg went to Merv in disguise and then crossed the desert to Bukhara and Tashkent.

The irrigated area along the Kopet Dag ends east of Ashkebat. Farther east there is desert, then the small oasis of Tejent, more desert, and the much larger oasis of Merv. Merv had the great fortress of Kaushut Khan and was inhabited by Merv Tekes, who had also fought at Geok Tepe. As soon as the Russians were established in Askhabad, traders, and also spies, began moving between the Kopet Dag and Merv. Some elders from Merv went north to Petroalexandrovsk and offered a degree of submission to the Russians there. The Russians at Askhabad had to explain that both groups were part of the same empire. In February 1882, Alikhanov visited Merv and approached Makhdum Kuli Khan, who had been in command at Geok Tepe. In September, Alikhanov persuaded Makhdum Kuli Khan to swear allegiance to the White Czar.

Skobelev had been replaced by Rohrberg in the spring of 1881, who was followed General Komarov in the spring of 1883. Near the end of 1883, General Komarov led 1,500 men to occupy the Tejen oasis. After Komarov's occupation of Tejen, Alikhanov and Makhdum Kuli Khan went to Merv and called a meeting of elders, one threatening and the other persuading. Having no wish to repeat the slaughter at Geok Tepe, 28 elders went to Askhabad, and on 12 February, swore allegiance in the presence of General Komarov. A faction in Merv tried to resist but was too weak to accomplish anything. On 16 March 1884, Komarov occupied Merv. The subject Khanates of Khiva and Bukhara were now surrounded by Russian territory.

=== Panjdeh incident ===
Between Merv and the current Afghan border lies about 230 km (140 mi) of semi-desert. South of that is the important border fort of Herat. In the summer of 1884 Britain and Russia agreed to demarcate the northwest Afghan border. The Russians did what they could to push the border south before it became frozen. When they captured the Afghan fort of Panjdeh, Britain came close to threatening war. Both sides backed down and the border was delineated between 1885 and 1886.

=== Cost ===
Russian military expense records indicate that between 1869 and 1879, the Transcaspian campaign cost 4.8 million rubles, the 1879–1880 expedition 5.525 million rubles, and the 1880–1881 expedition 11 million rubles. Railroad construction to that point cost 4,429,991 rubles, and construction materials another 3.518 million rubles. Total expenses from 1869 to 1881 amounted to 29,274,991 rubles.

== Eastern border ==
The natural eastern boundary of Russian Turkestan was the eastern mountains, but the exact line had to be settled. There were four main problems.

=== Yakub Beg ===
East of the Feghana Valley and southeast of Fort Vernoye on the other side of the mountains is the oval Tarim Basin which had belonged to China since 1759. During the Dungan Revolt China lost partial control of its western territories. A man named Yakub Beg made himself master of Kashgar and most of the Tarim Basin. Kaufmann twice thought of attacking him. In 1872, forces were massed on the border but this was called off because of the impending war against Khiva. In 1875, more serious plans were made. A mission was sent to the Khan of Kokand to ask permission to move forces through his domains. A revolt broke out and the Russian troops were used instead to annex Kokand (see below). In 1877, China re-conquered the Tarim Basin and Yakub Beg was killed.

=== Occupation of Kulja ===
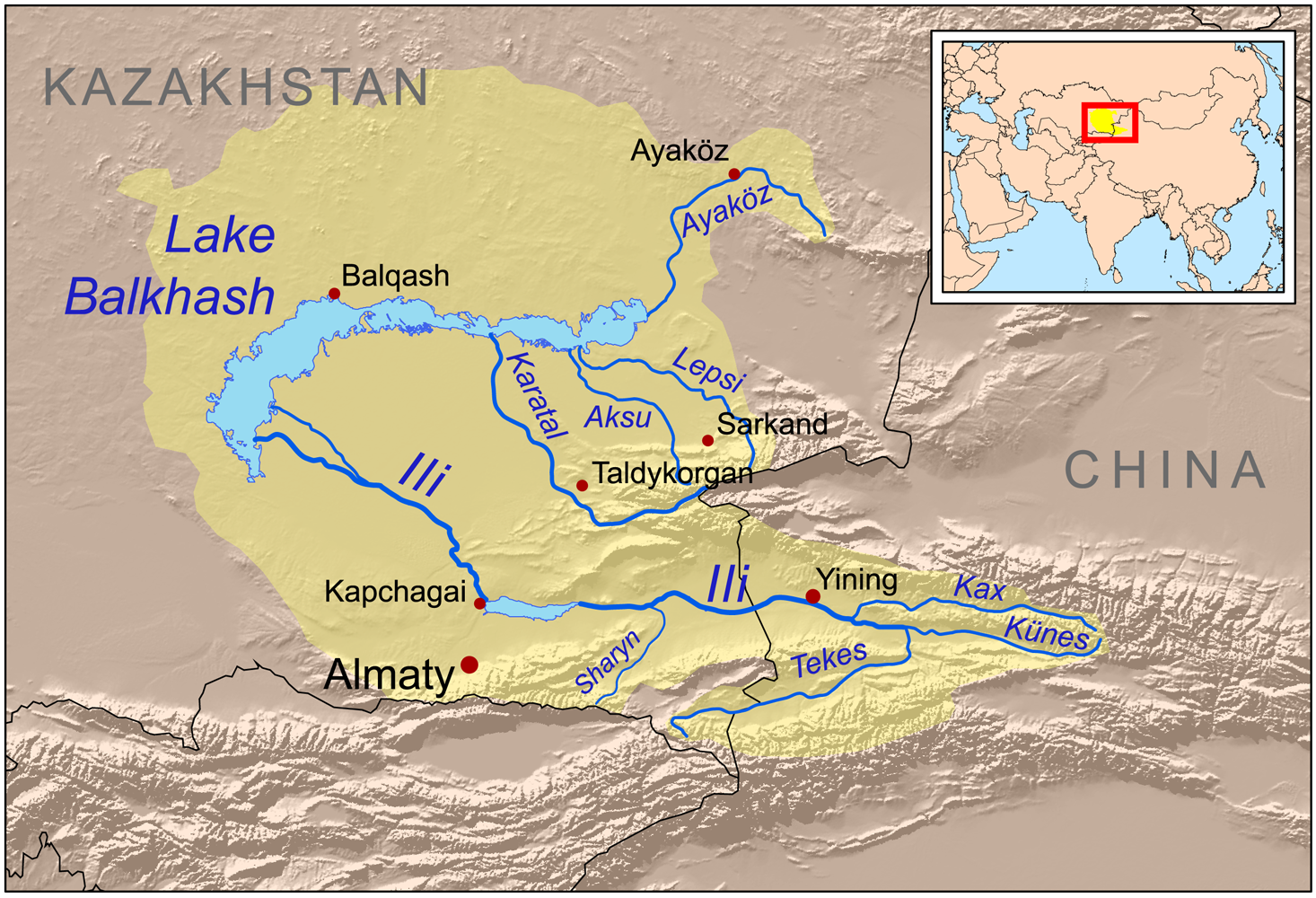
A map of the Ili River basin depicting Kulja (Yining), Fort Vernoye (Almaty), and the Tarim Basin (Lower right)

The Tien Shan Mountains run along the northern border of Kyrgyzstan. They continue east and separate Dzungaria in the north from the Tarim Basin in the south. On the Chinese side, the Borohoro Mountains branch off creating the upper Ili River valley with its capital of Kulja (modern Yining City). Although normally part of Dzungaria the valley opens out onto the Russian-controlled steppe. In 1866, the Dungans captured Kulja and massacred its inhabitants. They soon began fighting with the Taranchis (Uigurs) who soon became dominant. In 1870, it appeared that Yakub Beg might move on Kulja so Kaufmann occupied the Muzart Pass. In June 1871, General Kolpakovsky crossed the border and occupied Kulja (4 July 1871). Some talked of permanent occupation but the Russian Foreign Office told the Chinese that the province would be returned as soon as the Emperor could send enough troops to maintain order. In 1877, China regained control of Chinese Turkestan and requested the return of Kulja. In September 1879, the Chinese ambassador concluded a treaty at Livadia but his government rejected it. This was replaced by the more favorable Treaty of Saint Petersburg (1881). Russia finally evacuated Kulja in the spring of 1883. There were the usual border disputes and an additional protocol was signed at Chuguchak (Tacheng?) on 19 October 1883. The re-occupation of Kulja was one of the few Chinese successes against a Western power during the nineteenth century.

=== Occupation of the Pamirs ===
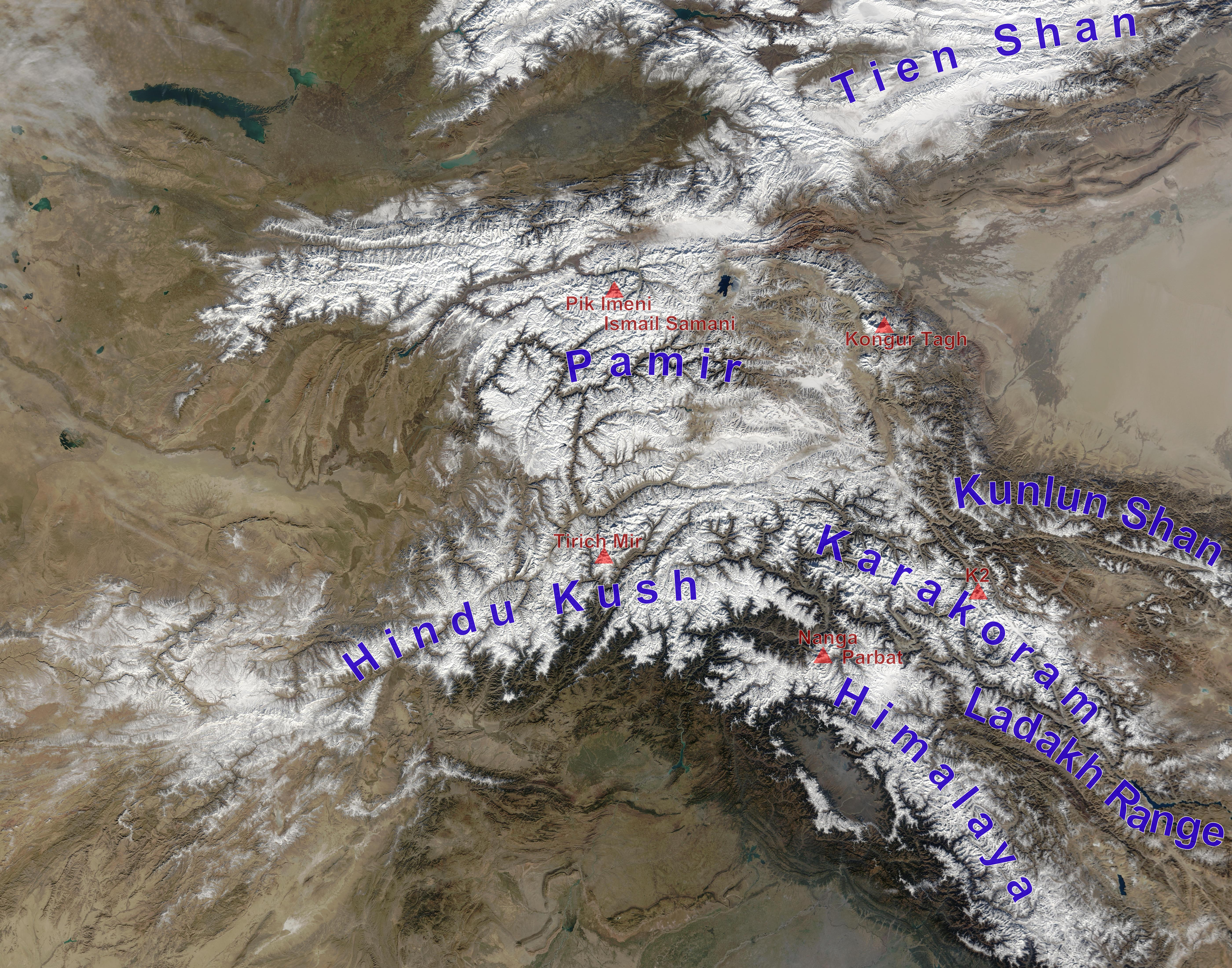
Pamirs from space Right: Tarim Basin Left: part of Afghanistan, Hindu Kush, Bactria, Turkestan Range, Ferghana Valley, main range of the Tien Shan

The southeast corner of Russian Turkestan was the high Pamirs which is now the Gorno-Badakhshan Autonomous Region of Tajikistan. The high plateaus on the east are used for summer pasture. On the west side, difficult gorges run down to the Panj River and Bactria. In 1871, Alexei Pavlovich Fedchenko got the Khan's permission to explore southward. He reached the Alay Valley but his escort would not permit him to go south onto the Pamir plateau. In 1876, Skobelev chased a rebel south to the Alay Valley and Kostenko went over the Kyzylart Pass and mapped the area around Karakul Lake on the northeast part of the plateau. In the next 20 years, most of the area was mapped. In 1891, the Russians informed Francis Younghusband that he was on their territory and later escorted a Lieutenant Davidson out of the area ('Pamir Incident'). In 1892, a battalion of Russians under Mikhail Ionov entered the area and camped near the present Murghab, Tajikistan in the northeast. Next year, they built a proper fort there (Pamirskiy Post). In 1895, their base was moved west to Khorog facing the Afghans. In 1893, the Durand Line established the Wakhan Corridor between the Russian Pamirs and British India.

== The Great Game ==
The Russian Turkestan (including Khiva and Bukhara) after 1900s

The Great Game refers to British attempts to block Russian expansion toward British India. Although there was much talk of possible Russian invasion of India and a number of British agents penetrating Central Asia, the British did nothing serious to prevent the Russian conquest of Turkestan, with one exception. Whenever Russian agents approached Afghanistan, the British reacted strongly, seeing Afghanistan as a necessary buffer state for the defense of India.

A Russian invasion of India seems improbable, but a number of British writers considered how it might be done. While not much was known about the geography, it was thought that they could reach Khiva and sail up the Oxus to Afghanistan. More realistically they might gain Persian support and cross northern Persia. Once in Afghanistan, they would swell their armies with offers of loot and invade India. Alternatively, they might invade India and provoke a native rebellion. The goal would probably not be the conquest of India, but to apply pressure on the British while Russia shifted focus on more important tasks, like taking Constantinople.

In 1801, there was some loose talk of a joint Franco-Russian invasion of India. During the Russo-Persian War, both British and French agents were active in Persia, their goals varying depending on which power was allied with Russia at the time. In 1810, Charles Christie and Henry Pottinger crossed western Afghanistan and eastern Persia. Christie was killed in 1812 supporting the Persians at the Battle of Aslanduz. In 1819, Muraviev reached Khiva. A Russian mission reached Bokhara in 1820. In 1825, Moorcroft reached Bukhara. In 1830, Arthur Conolly tried to reach Khiva from Persia but was turned back by bandits and continued on to Herat and British India. In 1832, Alexander Burnes reached Bokhara.

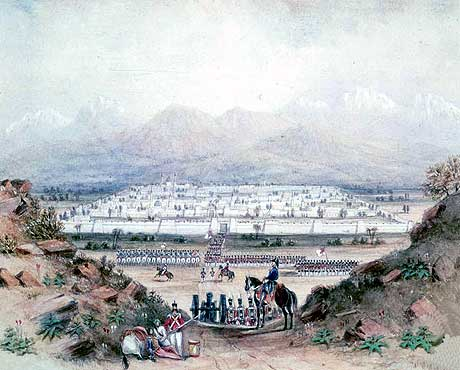
British army entering Kandahar in 1839

The period from 1837 to 1842 was especially active. In 1839, at the time of Perovsky's failed attack on Khiva, Abbot went to Khiva to negotiate the release of Russian slaves held there in order to remove a pretext for the invasion. He failed. Next year Richmond Shakespear went after him, was successful, and led 416 Russian slaves to the Caspian. In 1837, Jan Prosper Witkiewicz reached Kabul. In 1838, Persia besieged Herat, with British and Russian agents supporting the two sides. Britain ended the siege by occupying a Persian island. In 1838, Charles Stoddart went to Bokhara and was arrested. In 1841, Arthur Conolly went to secure his release and both were executed in 1842. During the First Anglo-Afghan War (1839–1842) Britain invaded Afghanistan, was driven out, re-invaded, and withdrew.

The British took Sindh in 1843 and Punjab in 1849, thereby gaining the Indus River and a border with Afghanistan. The Crimean War occurred in 1853–1856. A second Persian attack on Herat led to the Anglo-Persian War of 1856–1857. The Indian Mutiny occurred in 1857–1858. This was about the time Russian was building forts east from the Aral Sea (1847–1853). The Russian capture of Tashkent (1865) and Samarkand (1868) produced no British response.

In 1875, following the conquest of Khiva, Frederick Gustavus Burnaby rode from Orenburg to Khiva, an event that was only important because of his widely-read book. Kaufmann's intrigues in Kabul provoked the Second Anglo-Afghan War of 1878–1880. During the second battle of Geok Tepe, Colonel Charles Stewart was on the south side of the mountain doing something that has never been clarified.

On the Chinese side of the mountains a line of passes corresponding the Karakoram Highway provided a trade and pilgrim route from the Tarim Basin to India. It was not clear whether this could be used by an army. At the time of Yakub Beg, both Russian and British agents were active at his court. A number of Indians in the British service mapped the area around the Pamirs. Russian expansion in the Pamirs provoked the British to move northward and gain control of places like Hunza and Chitral.

The Great Game came to an end with the demarcation of the northern Afghan border in 1886 and 1893 and the Anglo-Russian Entente of 1907.

== See also ==
- Bibliography of the history of Central Asia
