= Janakorgan District =

Coordinates: 43°56′24″N 67°13′12″E

Janakorgan Жаңақорған
- District
- Жаңақорған ауданы
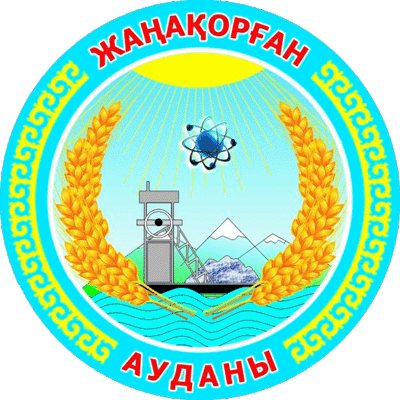
- Seal

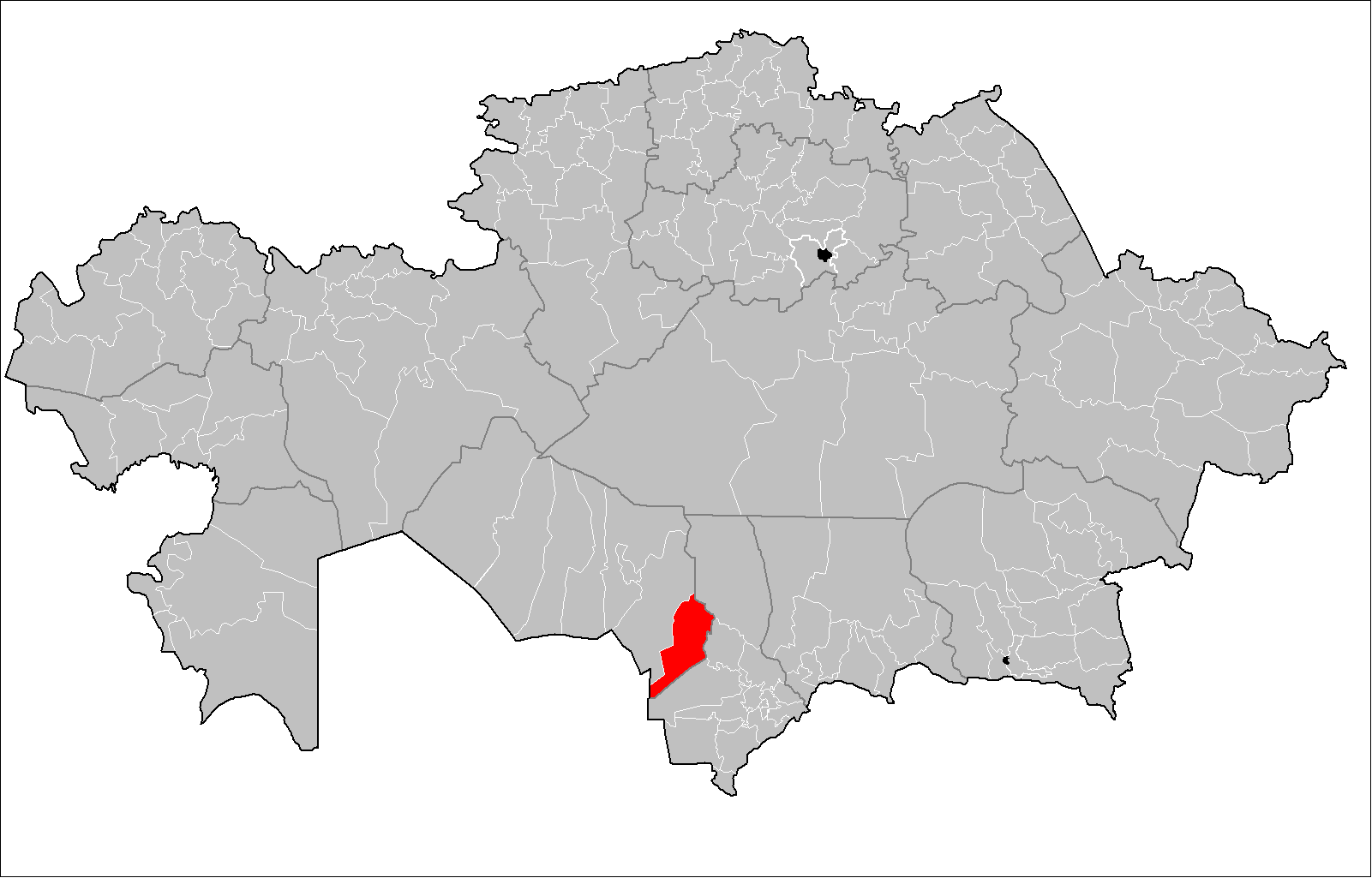
- Country: Kazakhstan
- Region: Kyzylorda Region
- Administrative center: Janakorgan

Government
  - Akim: Tleumbetov Murat Jolkeldinovich

Population (2013)
  - Total: 77,509
- Time zone: UTC+6 (East)

Janakorgan (Kazakh: Жаңақорған ауданы, Jañaqorğan audany) is a district of Kyzylorda Region in southern Kazakhstan. The administrative center of the district is the urban-type settlement of Janakorgan. Population: 77,509 (2013 estimate); 70,128 (2009 census results); 67,563 (1999 census results).
