= Alexander Debu =

Alexander Osipovich (Iosifovich) Debu
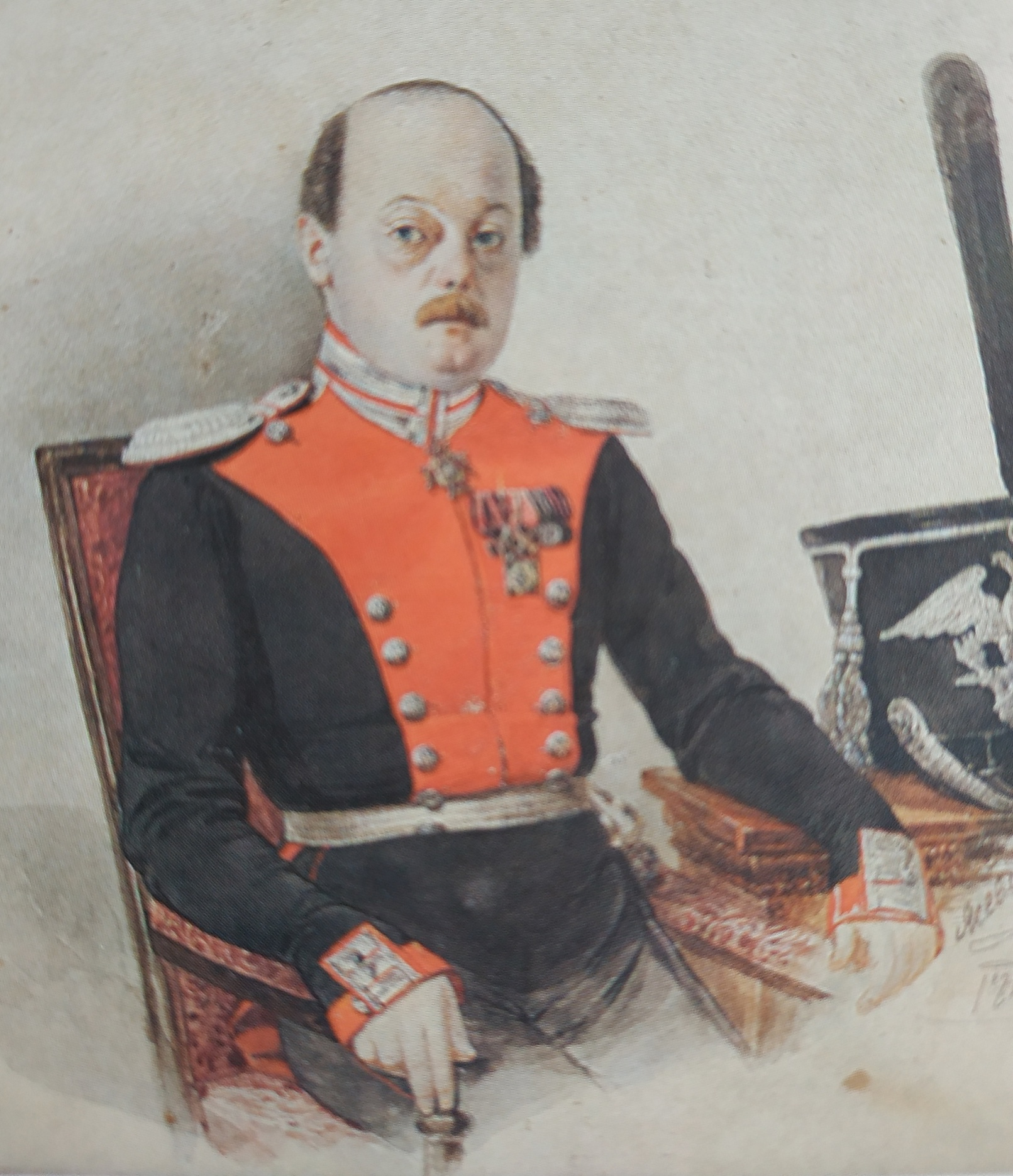
- Portrait of Alexander Debu by Russian painter Kazimir Yasevich.
- Born: 1802
- Died: 1862 (aged 59–60) Dzhulek
- Allegiance: Russian Empire
- Branch: Infantry
- Rank: Lieutenant general
- Commands: 14th Georgian Grenadier Regiment
- Conflicts: Khivan campaign of 1839–1840; Crimean War; Caucasian War; Russian conquest of Central Asia
- Awards: 4th Order of St. George; Golden Weapon for Bravery; 2nd Order of Saint Anna; 1st Class Order of Saint Stanislaus (House of Romanov)

Alexander Osipovich (Iosifovich) Debu (1802–1862) was a Russian general. He was a participant of the Caucasian War, Crimean War, and the Russian conquest of Central Asia.

He is particularly famous for capturing the Kokand fort of Yany-Kurgan in September 1861.

== Biography ==
Alexander Debus was born into a noble family in the Saint Petersburg Governorate. Alexander was the son of Joseph Lvovich Debu, Joseph was a privy councilor and a senator. The Debu family was of French descent.

Debu joined the military between 1815 and 1820. On April 24, 1820 he was put into Tenginsky 77th Infantry Regiment with a rank of Praporshchik.

From 1824 to 1825 he participated in battles against Caucasian tribes during the Caucasian War. He was promoted for his courage and bravery. First to a second lieutenant, then to a lieutenant, and later to a staff-captain.

In 1829, he was transferred to the Orenburg district. He was staffed into Lithuanian Life Guards Regiment where he served until he reached the rank of captain.

Debu participated in the 1839 Khivan campaign. During that campaign, Debu got in favor with Vasily Perovsky. Debu was awarded and promoted to a colonel for his service in the campaign.

In 1841, Debu returned to the Lithuanian Regiment in Warsaw before being sent to the Caucasus in spring of 1844. For his further service and courage in battle, Debu received a 4th class Order of St. George, a Golden Weapon for Bravery, and a 2nd grade Order of Saint Anna.

In March 1846, Debu was made the commander of the 14th Georgian Grenadier Regiment. Debu continued to fight in the Caucasian War and he was promoted to a Major general in 1849. In 1851, Debu successfully won an engagement against a Caucasian tribe. For that action, he was awarded a 1st class Order of Saint Stanislaus.

Debu continued his service in the Caucasus during the 1850s. When the Crimean War broke out, Debu commanded infantry regiments in the Caucasus theatre of the war. Debu successfully fought against both the Caucasian tribes and the Ottoman armies. For his service in the Crimean War, Debu was promoted to a Lieutenant general in 1859.

In May 1859, he was once again transferred to Turkestan. Debu became the commander of the Syr-Darya line - a logistical and a defensive line in the region.

In September 1861, Debu commanded the 4th Turkestan Line Battalion and he led a campaign to capture the Kokand fort of Yany-Kurgan. Debu led a brief, but a victorious, campaign during which he captured and destroyed Yany-Kurgan. The capture of Yany-Kurgan was a small engagement when compared with other battles of the conquest; however, it was a significant engagement because the loss of Yany-Kurgan deprived the Kokand of strategic initiative in the region. Following the capture of Yany-Kurgan, the Russians would launch further campaigns and capture more cities in Turkestan.

Alexander Debu died in Fort Dzhulek in September 1862. He died while still being in command of the Syr-Darya line.
