= Charter on the Orenburg Kyrgyz =

The charter on the Orenburg Kirgiz
- Created: 1822
- Date effective: 1824
- Location: Orenburg oblast
- Author: P. Essen

The Charter of the Orenburg Kirghiz in 1824, created in 1822, was designed by Orenburg Governor-General P. Essen. The draft of a similar charter for the Junior Zhuz was adopted by the Asian Committee in 1824, leading to the immediate abolition of the khanate.

== History ==
Internecine conflict emerged among the sultans of the Junior Zhuz. In 1822, the Governor of the Orenburg region, P.K. Essen, sent a draft of "Charter on the Orenburg Kyrgyz" to the capital. The project was sent for revision to the Asian Committee. In the spring of 1824, Tsar Alexander I approved the final version. Khan Shergazy (the khan) was summoned to Orenburg, where he was given a life stipend, and his authority over the Junior Zhuz was abolished.

A few years later, in 1828, the Junior Zhuz was divided into 3 parts: The West (tribes Baiuli), The Centre (The Zhetira tribe), and the East (Alimuliu tribe with a few kipchak and argin). Each part was led by a sultan, and the Zhuz was under the influence of the General-governor of the region.

Following these events, Russian influence and control over Junior Zhuz increased.

Due to the expansion of Russian territories and the rise of capitalism, a reform known as “The Administrative reform of 1868-1869 was passed.
