= Mikhail Ivanov =

Mikhail Ivanov may refer to:

- Mikhail Dimitrov Ivanov (1900–1986), later known as Omraam Mikhaël Aïvanhov, Bulgarian philosopher and esotericist
- Mikhail Ippolitov-Ivanov (1859–1935), Russian composer and conductor
- Mikhail Matveevich Ivanov (1748–1823), Russian painter
- Mikhail Ivanov (composer) (1849–1927), Russian composer
- Mikhail Ivanov (cross-country skier) (born 1977), Russian cross country skier
- Mikhail Ivanov (rower) (born 1965), Russian rower
- Mikhail Ivanov (sledge hockey) (born 1983), Russian sledge hockey player
- Mikhail Ivanov (water polo) (born 1958), Russian former water polo player
- Mikhail Ivanov (chess player) (born 1963), Serbian-Russian chess grandmaster
