= Zhanakorgan =

Coordinates: 43°55′N 67°15′E

Zhanakorgan (Kazakh: Жаңақорған, Jañaqorğan) is an urban-type settlement and the administrative center of Zhanakorgan District in Kyzylorda Region of Kazakhstan. This may be to 'Yani Kurgan' (new tumulus) captured in 1861 during the Russian conquest of Turkestan.
