= Eset Kotibaruli =

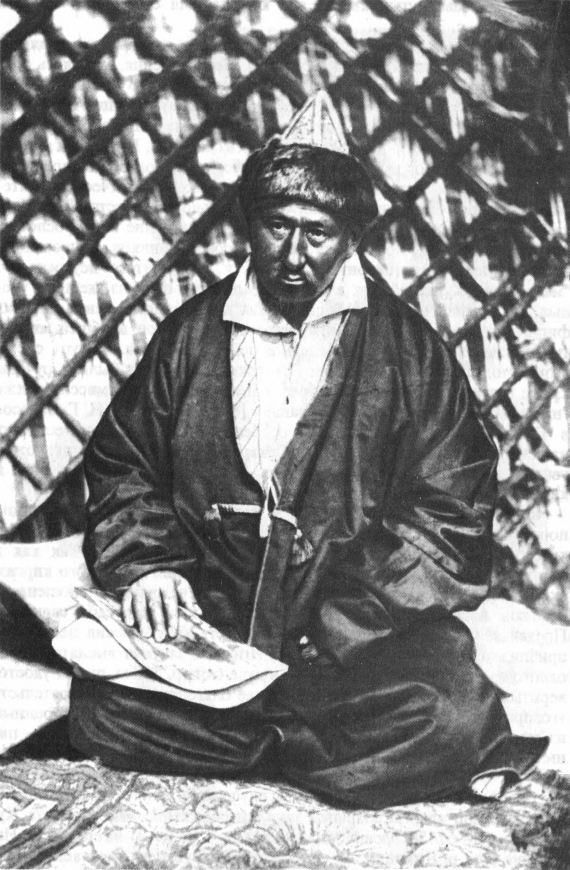
Eset Kotibaruli in 1858

Eset Kotibaruli (Kazakh: Есет Көтібарұлы, Eset Kötıbarūly) (1803–1889), sometimes Izzat (or Izzet) Kutebar, was the leader of the wars against Khiva and Kokand khanates, the head of an anti-colonial uprising and the leader of the national liberation movement of Kazakhs. He was a Kazakh rebel and guerrilla leader who was active from the 1820s to 1858. He first robbed the Bukhara caravan in 1822, and was at his height as a raider and scourge of the Russian invaders in the 1840s. They eventually persuaded him to suspend his activities and rewarded him with a gold medal, but he rebelled again in the early 1850s. He was captured in 1854, but he either escaped or was released.

== Origin ==
Eset Batyr was originally from Shekty-Kabak subdivision of Alimuli tribe of the Lesser Horde. This tribe had nomadic style of life on the territory of modern Aktobe Province of Kazakhstan and Orenburg province of the Russian Federation, as well as between the Ural(Zhaik) and Volga rivers. Eset Batyr was born in 1803 near the Lake Shalkar in Kazakhstan in the family of famous judge and leader Kotibar.

== Anti-Khiva uprising ==
Kazakhs of Lesser Horde constantly conflicted with Khiva troops due to aggressive attacks into the territory of the Kazakh Steppe by the Khiva Kingdom. Eset Batyr led a large army of Kazakhs and defeated the aggression of Khiva. Eset Batyr also successfully defended his ancestral lands against Kokand Khanate's aggression.

== Anti-Colonial Uprising ==
From 1847 to 1858 Eset Batyr led a revolt of Kazakhs against the Russian administration. The Tsar's administration sent two Cossack detachments and 200 Kazakhs controlled by Sultan Taukin and Major Mikhailov from the Ural division. Also, 600 Kazakhs were sent under the leadership of Elekey Kasymov by the Tsarist administration. Eset Batyr sent 800 people against the Russian troops and destroyed them. In 1854–1858, there was an uprising of Kazakhs living in Aral region, due to the high taxes of the Tsarist administration. At that time, extortion or taxation was carried out by camels. For instance, the military campaign of Perovskii in 1853 to conquer the city of Akmeshit in Kazakhstan required almost 8 thousand camels. Kazakhs organized an uprising and moved to the territory of the Emba river. The rebels put forward a number of demands: the removal of tax for households, termination of the sending of punitive detachments to the Kazakh steppe, allowing usage of pastures and the possibility to move on the banks of rivers Zhem, Mugadzhar, Elek, Kobda, Zhayyk. V.A Perovskiy organized a punitive detachment and sent Baron Wrangel with a large army to suppress the uprisings. Eset Batyr agreed with Baron Wrangel, but the war did not stop and subsequently Eset batyr continued military actions against the military colonial posts and Cossack troops. The newly created punitive detachment under the leadership of Sultan Arslan Zhantorin was defeated by the army of Eset Batyr. Sultan Arslan Zhantorin was killed.

== The suppression of uprising ==
The suppression of the uprising was accompanied by mass killings of the civilian population. Many rebels were executed while others were sent to jail such as Batyr Becket Serkebaeyev. In 1858, General Katenin, newly appointed as Russia's Governor-General of the Orenburg district, decided to attempt conciliation by offering a general amnesty to all rebels. At first, Eset refused to enter into negotiations with the Russians but changed his mind after he learned about Nikolay Pavlovich Ignatyev's mission en route for Khiva and Bokhara. Eset met Ignatyev and agreed to make his peace with Russia, promising future loyalty to the Tsar.

== Eset Batyr in historical essays ==
- AI Dobrosmyslov, "Turgayskaya Oblast - historical sketch" (Orenburg, 1902, pp. 407–409): "The most important Batyrs were Shekti batyrs Dzhankozha Nurmuhamedov and Eset Kotibarov. Our administration quarrelled with Eset Kotibarov and created a dangerous enemy. His influence and importance among people is indisputable… "
- Chief of General Staff of Defense ministries L. Meyer St. Peterburg in 1865, "Kirgiskaya steppe, Orenburgskogo Office" (65-69 pp.) -: "Eset is a good family man, his dangers were shared with his several brothers and a mother who on hearsay, is the woman of excellent mind and energies… "
- "Russian art piece" 1858, 1 January 31 issue, "Minor Kirgiz Horde, a nomadic proposes Ust-Urta : … The name of Eset in the Little Orde was also formidable, as of his colleague Keny-Sary, who was killed in the fortieth years … or as the name of the hero Shamil of Caucasus.".
- The artist Bronislaw Zaleski, "Journey to the Kazakh Sahara, Paris", in 1865:" I spent one day at Iset Kotibarov's place. For that era it was the most interesting person, very popular in the steppes…… He remained leader and served as a judge."
- E. P. Kovalevsky, Head of Department MFA Russian Empire, during the campaign to Khiva in 1839-1840: "… At the crossroads of the steppe I have met Batyr Eset Kotibarov, before he led the anti-colonial movement in priaral region, among some of the Kazakhs of the Lesser Horde. Eset had a body comparable to Hercules, his athletic form, his wild beauty and actions full of courage could impress Europeans and had strong influence among his fellow citizens " (" Explorer by land and seas ", kn.1, str.155).
- Also uprising of Eset widely reported in Russian publications such as Century 19: "Contemporary" (1851), "World illustration" (1860), "Domestic notes" (1860), "Russian Gazette" (1859), "Russian art piece" (1860), etc.
- Furthermore, books of Torekhanov Tauman Alybayuly describe in detail about Eset Kotibaruli.

== Cultural legacy ==
In popular culture, Izzat is a major character in Flashman at the Charge (1973), written by George MacDonald Fraser. Although Izzat's character in the novel is loosely based upon him as a real person, Fraser added an appendix in which he summarised his researches of the real Izzat.
