= Karakalpakstan (de facto state) =

De facto independent Karakalpakstan (1990–1993)

Karakalpakstan Soviet Socialist Republic (1990–1991) Republic of Karakalpakstan (1991–1993)
- 1990–1993
- Flag (1990–1992); Flag (1992–1993) Emblem (1990–1993)

- Location of Karakalpakstan in red, when it was part of the Soviet Union in 1989.
- Status: De facto independent state
- Capital and largest city: Nukus
- Official languages: Karakalpak; Uzbek
- Chairman of the Soviet Supreme/President of Karalpakastan/Chairman of the Supreme Council
  - 1990–1991: Tursun Eshimbeyova
  - 1991–1992: Dauletbay Shamshetov
  - 1992–1993: Urbiniyaz Ashirbekov
- Chairman of the Council Ministers
  - 1990–1992: Amin Tojiyev
  - 1992–1993: Rejepbay Yuldashev
- First Secretary
  - 1990–1991: Sagyndyk Niyetullayev
  - 1991: Dauletbay Shamshetov
- Legislature: Supreme Soviet of Karakalpak
- Establishment: Cold War
- History
  - Sovereignty declared; effectively independence declared: 14 December 1990
  - Officially independence declared; Renamed as the Republic of Karakalpakstan: 21 December 1991
  - Constitution adopted; per constitution part of Uzbekistan: 8 December 1992
  - Interstate agreement to officially rejoin Uzbekistan: 9 January 1993
  - Adoption of the 1993 consitution; Becomes an autonomous republic within the Republic of Uzbekistan: 9 April 1993

Area
  - Total: 166,590 km^{2} (64,320 sq mi)
Preceded by	Succeeded by
Karakalpak Autonomous Soviet Socialist Republic	Republic of Karakalpakstan (part of Uzbekistan)
- Today part of: Republic of Uzbekistan: Republic of Karakalpakstan

Between late 1990 and early 1993, Karakalpakstan was de facto independent, however one source indicate that Karakalpakstan was only de jure independent between 1990 and 1991, while another says it's not known, however that it could be a similar case as it was for the Chechen Republic.

== Background ==
On 19 February 1925, the Karakalpak Autonomous Oblast was established as an autonomous oblast of the Russian Soviet Federative Socialist Republic, a Soviet Republic of the Soviet Union. On 20 March 1932, the Karakalpak Autonomous Oblast was replaced with the Karakalpak Autonomous Soviet Socialist Republic, an autonomous republic of the Uzbek Soviet Socialist Republic, a Soviet Republic of the Soviet Union. On 20 June 1990, the Supreme Soviet of the Uzbek Soviet Socialist Republic declared sovereignty; however, Uzbekistan became independent one year later, on 31 August 1991. Meanwhile, the Karakalpakstan Autonomous Soviet Socialist Republic declared sovereignty on 14 December 1990 (in accordance with the Law of the USSR of April 26, 1990). The declaration of sovereignty by Karakalpakstan was also an effective declaration of independence, an with it Karakalpakstan a independent state.

== Development (1990–1993) ==
From 14 December 1990 on, the status of Karakalpakstan, then called Karakalpakstan Soviet Socialist Republic or just Soviet Republic of Karakalpakstan, became unclear till 1991. One source argues that Karakalpakstan only gained de jure independence, while another source mentions that the declaration of sovereignty by Karakalpakstan could have been similar to the one of the Chechen Republic, which declared de facto independence. On 21 December 1991, Karakalpakstan officially declared independence from the Soviet Union and renamed itself the Republic of Karakalpakstan. The Republic of Karakalpakstan adopted a constitution on 8 December 1992, after the constitution of Karakalpakstan was part of Uzbekistan. On 9 January 1993, the authorities of Uzbekistan and Karakalpakstan made an agreement, which resulted that Karakalpakstan will join Uzbekistan and that a independence referendum will take place twenty years later. After the joining agreement with the Republic of Uzbekistan, the Republic of Karakalpakstan adopted a new constitution on 9 April 1993, which turned then into a parliamentary republic. The adoption of the new constitution marks the end of the de facto independence.

=== Foreign relations ===
No country recognized the de facto independence of Karakalpakstan.

=== Birth rate ===
The rate of natural growth in Karakalpakstan in 1991 was more than 30 births per 1,000 and slightly higher in the rural areas.

== Aftermath ==
Years later, in 2022 protests broke out in Karakalpakstan, due the idea by the central government to remove the status of Karakalpakstan.

== Comparison to other Post-Soviet Republic de facto states ==
Slavomír Horák and Martin Lepič argue that Karakalpakstan was different from other de facto states, as the demand for complete separation was not strong. Another factor they name is that the Karakalpaks were not and still are not a majority in Karakalpakstan.

== List of leaders ==
=== Head of State ===
No.	Portrait	Name (Birth–Death)	Term of office			Party
No.	Portrait	Name (Birth–Death)	Took office	Left office	Time in office	Party
1		Tursun Eshimbeyova (?)	14 December 1990	February 1991	c. 49 days	Unknown
2		Dauletbay Shamshetov (1948 –1998)	February 1991	20 June 1992	c. 1 year, 140 days	CPSU (CPU; KCP) Xalq Manfati
3		Urbiniyaz Ashirbekov (?)	20 June 1992	9 April 1993	c. 293 days	Unknown

=== Head of Government ===
No.	Portrait	Name (Birth–Death)	Term of office			Party
No.	Portrait	Name (Birth–Death)	Took office	Left office	Time in office	Party
1		Amin Tojiyev (1947–2026)	14 December 1990	January 1992	c. 1 year, 18 days	CPSU (CPU; KCP) Unknown
2		Rejepbay Yuldashev (?)	January 1992	9 April 1993	c. 1 year, 98 days	Unknown

=== First Secretary ===
No.	Portrait	Name (Birth–Death)	Term of office			Party
No.	Portrait	Name (Birth–Death)	Took office	Left office	Time in office	Party
1		Sagyndyk Niyetullayev (?)	14 December 1990	18 January 1991	35 days	CPSU (CPU; KCP)
2		Dauletbay Shamshetov (1948 –1998)	18 January 1991	14 September 1991	239 days	CPSU (CPU; KCP)

== See also ==
- South Ossetian Soviet Democratic Republic
- Pridnestrovian Moldavian Soviet Socialist Republic
- Chechen Republic of Ichkeria
