= Uzbekistani sum =

Currency of Uzbekistan

Uzbek sum
Oʻzbek soʻmi (Uzbek); Ўзбек сўми (Uzbek)
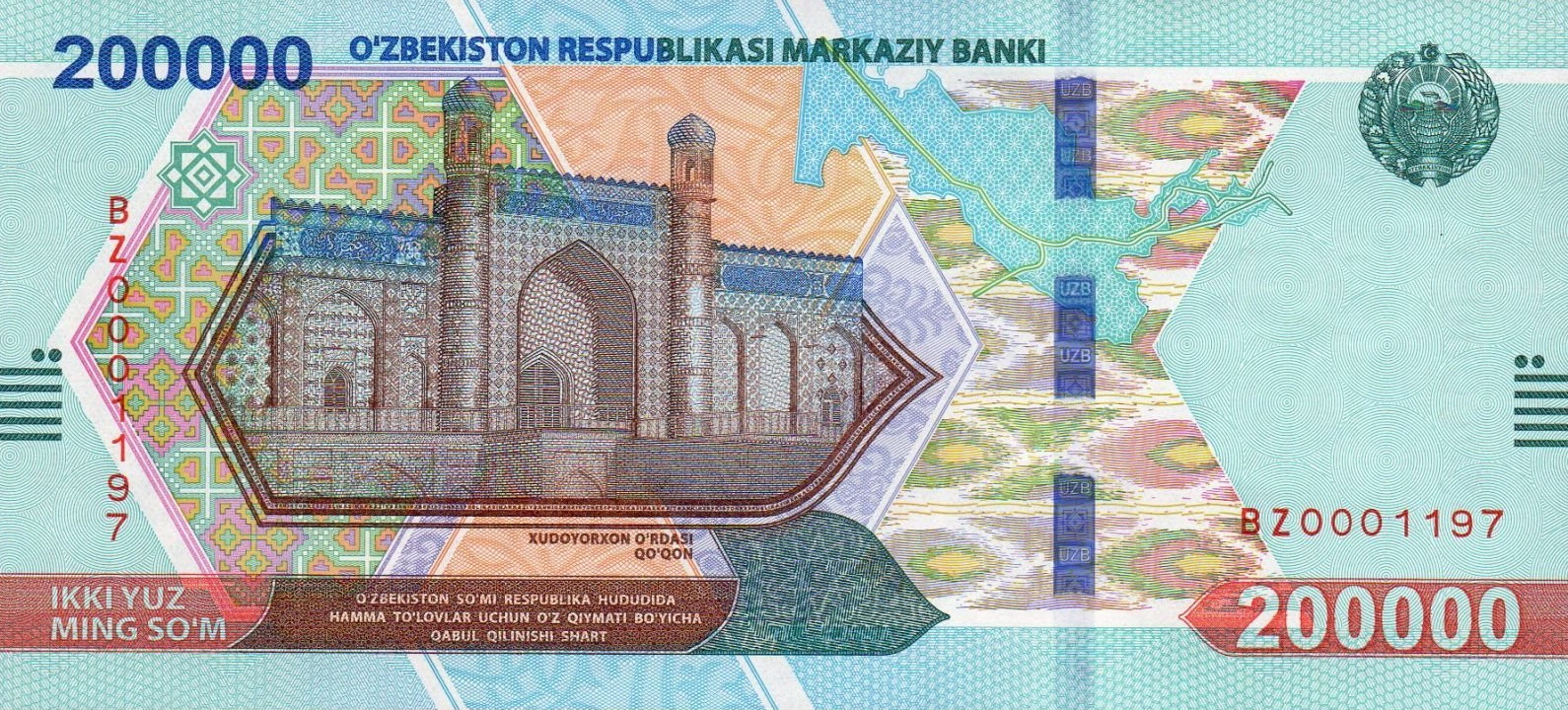
- 200,000 sum banknote (2022)

ISO 4217
- Code: UZS (numeric: 860)
- Subunit: 0.01

Units of account
- Plural: The language(s) of this currency do(es) not have a morphological plural distinction.
- Subunit
- 1/100: Tiyin

Denominations
- Banknotes
- Freq. used: 2,000, 5,000, 10,000, 20,000, 50,000, 100,000, 200,000 sum
- Rarely used: 1,000 sum
- Coins
- Freq. used: 50, 100, 200, 500, 1,000 sum

Demographics
- Date of introduction: 11 July 1994
- Replaced: Soviet ruble
- User(s): Uzbekistan

Issuance
- Central bank: Central Bank of the Republic of Uzbekistan (Oʻzbekiston Respublikasi Markaziy Banki)
- Website: www.cbu.uz

Valuation
- Inflation: 6.4%
- Source: , July 2026

The sum (Note: Uzbek: soʻm, сўм, سۉم, IPA: [sɵm]) (ISO code: UZS) is the official currency of the Republic of Uzbekistan. The Government replaced the Soviet Ruble with the Sum at par on 16 July 1994. No subdivisions of this Sum were initially issued and only banknotes were produced in denominations of 1, 3, 5, 10, 25, 50, 100, 200, 500, 1,000, 5,000, and 10,000 Sum. Further series, however, have introduced coins and a subunit, the tiyin. Because it was meant to be a transitional currency, the original design used during the first years of the Republic was rather simplistic.

== Etymology ==
The official name of the Soviet currency in the Kazakh, Kyrgyz, Tajik, and Uzbek languages was the som, and this name appeared written on the back of banknotes, among the texts for the value of the note in all 15 official languages of the USSR. This word translates as 'pure' in several Turkic languages, and is derived from the Proto-Turkic *som, meaning 'pure' or 'solid'. The word implies pure silver or gold.

== First sum ==
=== History ===
Like other republics of the former Soviet Union, Uzbekistan continued using the Soviet/Russian ruble after independence. On 26 July 1993, a new series of Russian ruble was issued and the old Soviet/Russian ruble ceased to be legal tender in Russia. Some successor states had their national currencies before the change, some chose to continue using the pre-1993 Soviet/Russian ruble, and some chose to use both the pre-1993 and the new Russian ruble. Tables of modern monetary history: Asia implies that both old and new rubles were used in Uzbekistan.

Uzbekistan replaced the ruble with the sum at par in on 15 November 1993. No subdivisions of this sum were issued and only banknotes were produced, in denominations of 1, 3, 5, 10, 25, 50, 100, 200, 500, 1,000, 5,000, and 10,000 sum. Because it was meant to be a transitional currency, the design was rather simplistic. All notes had the Coat of arms on the obverse, and Sher-Dor Madrasah of the Registan in Samarkand on the reverse.

=== Coins ===
No coins were issued for the first sum.

=== Banknotes ===
The first banknotes were issued by the State Bank of Uzbekistan in 1993. All of the denominations share the same designs: the Coat of arms of Uzbekistan on the front and the madrasahs on Registan Square in Samarkand.

Image		Value	Dimensions (mm)
Obverse	Reverse	Value	Dimensions (mm)
		1 sum	120×61
		3 sum	120×61
		5 sum	120×61
		10 sum	120×61
		25 sum	120×61
		50 sum	144×69
		100 sum	144×69
		200 sum	144×69
		500 sum	144×69
		1,000 sum	144×69
		5,000 sum	144×69
		10,000 sum	144×69

== Second sum ==
=== History ===
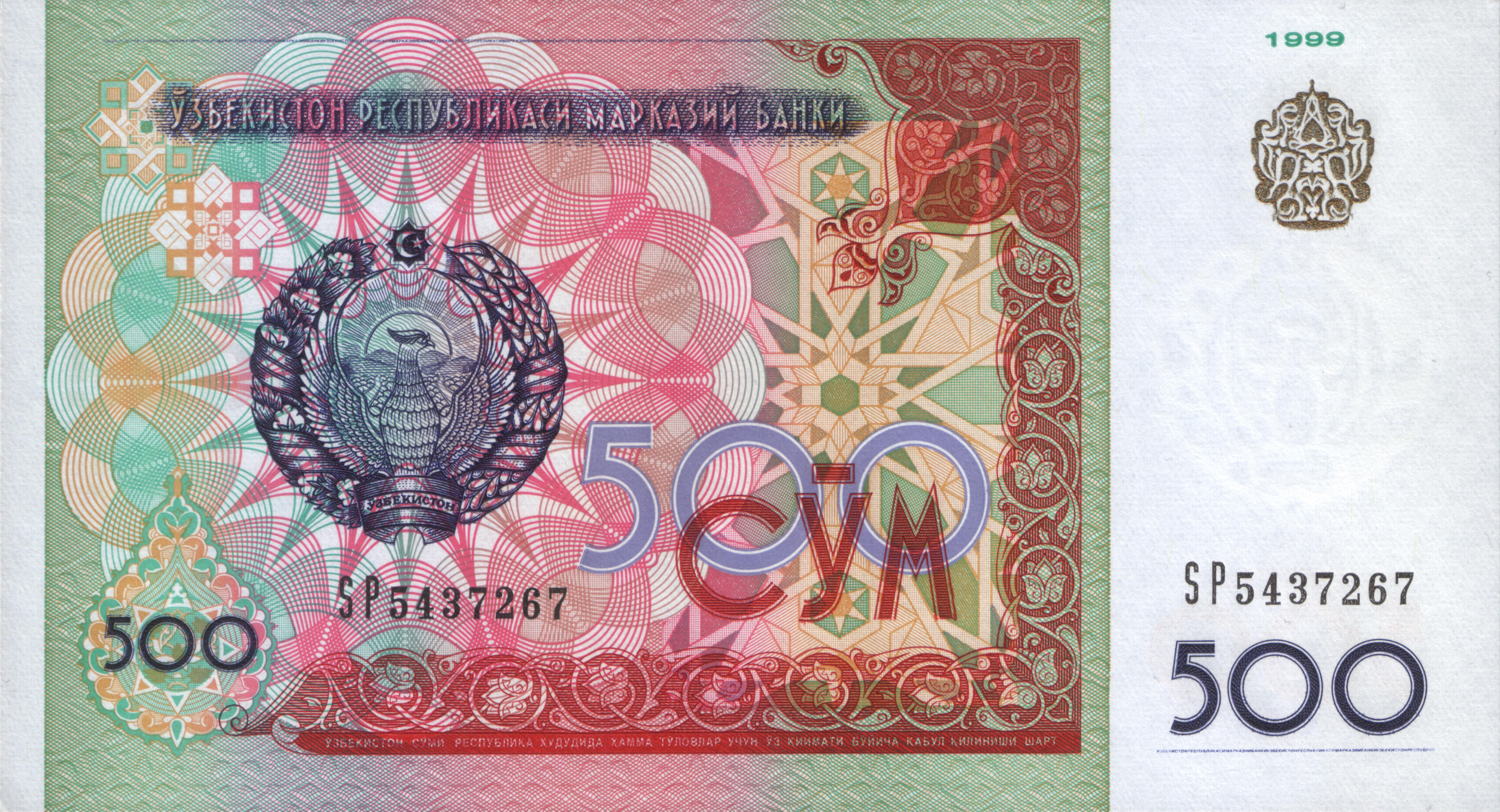
500 sum note issued in 1999.

On 1 July 1994, a second sum was introduced at a rate of 1 new sum = 1,000 old sum. This sum is subdivided into 100 tiyin.

==== Inflation ====
Until 2013, the largest denomination of Uzbek currency was the 1,000-sum banknote, then worth US$0.60, requiring Uzbeks to carry large bundles of notes for routine transactions.

Back in 2019, a new largest denomination was issued, the 100,000-sum banknote (as of October 2019 worth US$10.55), which made the situation easier. The smallest denomination, the 1 tiyin, is worth less than 1/9400 of a US cent making it the "world's most worthless coin" that was still legal tender until 1 March 2020. However, coins and banknotes smaller than 50 sum are rare now.

The rampant inflation situation is considered a politically sensitive issue in Uzbekistan, which is why the Uzbek government is slow to acclimate the currency to its current value by issuing higher coin and note denominations. As a result, the current highest coin denomination in circulation is the 1000 sum while the highest banknote denomination is the 200,000 sum. Official state figures put inflation as of the first half of 2011 at 3.6%, however accurate numbers are pinned far higher. Coins and banknotes below 50 sum are practically worthless now.

As of December 2025, the annual inflation rate in Uzbekistan is 7.3%. This marks the lowest inflation rate since December 2016. The Central Bank of Uzbekistan has noted that the slowdown is primarily attributed to the stabilizing effects of the 2024 energy price liberalization.

=== Coins ===
Three series of coins have been issued for the second sum. They can be easily distinguished by the script used for the Uzbek language. The first series was written in Cyrillic script, while the second and third series is written in Latin script.

==== First series (1994–2000) ====
First series coins (1994–2000)
Image	Value	Technical parameters			Description			Date of			
Image	Value	Diameter	Mass	Composition	Edge	Obverse	Reverse	minting	issue	withdrawal	lapse
	1 tiyin	16,9 mm	1,75 g	Brass-clad steel	Smooth	Coat of arms with 12 stars State title	Value, year of minting	1994	July 1994	1 March 2020	1 January 2021
	3 tiyin	19,9 mm	2,7 g	Brass-clad steel	Reeded	Coat of arms with 12 stars State title	Value, year of minting	1994	July 1994	1 March 2020	1 January 2021
	5 tiyin	17 mm	1,8 g	Brass-clad steel	Reeded	Coat of arms with 12 stars State title	Value, year of minting	1994	July 1994	1 March 2020	1 January 2021
	10 tiyin	18,7 mm	2,85 g	Nickel-clad steel	Reeded	Coat of arms with 12 stars State title	Value, year of minting	1994	July 1994	1 March 2020	1 January 2021
	20 tiyin	22 mm	4 g	Nickel-clad steel	Inscription: “ЙИГИРМА ТИЙИН ЙИГИРМА ТИЙИН”	Coat of arms with 12 stars State title	Value, year of minting	1994	July 1994	1 March 2020	1 January 2021
	50 tiyin	23,9 mm	4,8 g	Nickel-clad steel	Inscription: “ЭЛЛИК ТИЙИН * ЭЛЛИК ТИЙИН * ЭЛЛИК ТИЙИН”	Coat of arms with 12 stars State title	Value, year of minting	1994	July 1994	1 March 2020	1 January 2021
	1 sum	19,8 mm	2,72 g	Nickel-clad steel	Smooth	Coat of arms with 12 stars State title	Value, year of minting	1997, 1998, 1999	1997	1 March 2020	1 January 2021
	5 sum	22,2 mm	4 g	Nickel-clad steel	Smooth	Coat of arms with 12 stars State title	Value, year of minting	1997, 1998, 1999	1997	1 March 2020	1 January 2021
	10 sum	24 mm	4,7 g	Nickel-clad steel	Smooth	Coat of arms with 12 stars State title	Value, year of minting	1997, 1998, 1999, 2000	1997	1 March 2020	1 January 2021
These images are to scale at 2.5 pixels per millimetre. For table standards, see the coin specification table.

==== Second series (2000–2004) ====
Second Series
Image	Value	Technical parameters			Description			Date of minting	Withdrawal
Image	Value	Diameter	Mass	Composition	Edge	Obverse	Reverse	Date of minting	Withdrawal
	1 sum	18.4 mm	2.83 g	Stainless steel	Reeded	Coat of arms without stars Bank title, year of minting	Value, map of Uzbekistan	2000	1 March 2020
	5 sum	21.2 mm	3.35 g	Brass-clad steel	Plain	Coat of arms without stars Bank title, year of minting	Value, map of Uzbekistan	2001	1 March 2020
	10 sum	19.75 mm	2.71 g	Nickel-clad steel	Plain	Coat of arms without stars Bank title, year of minting	Value, map of Uzbekistan	2001	1 March 2020
	50 sum	26.1 mm	8 g	Nickel-clad steel	Plain and reeded sections	Coat of arms without stars Bank title, year of minting	Value, map of Uzbekistan	2001	1 July 2019
	50 sum	26.1 mm	7.9 g	Nickel-clad steel	Plain and reeded sections	Coat of arms without stars Bank title, year of minting	Value, statue and ruin of Shahrisabz	2002	1 July 2019
	100 sum	26.9 mm	7.9 g	Nickel-plated steel	Inscription	Coat of arms without stars Bank title, year of minting	Value, map of Uzbekistan, sunrays	2004	1 July 2019
These images are to scale at 2.5 pixels per millimetre. For table standards, see the coin specification table.

==== Third series (2018–2022) ====
In May 2018 the introduction of new coins valued 50, 100, 200 and 500 sum was announced. All previously issued banknotes and coins of those denominations were to be withdrawn from circulation by 1 July 2020. In December 2022, the Central Bank of the Republic of Uzbekistan introduced a 1,000 sum coin into circulation, notable as it is the first bi-metallic coin issued for circulation since the introduction of the Uzbek sum in 1994.

Third series (2018)
Image	Value	Technical parameters			Description			Date of			
Image	Value	Diameter	Mass	Composition	Edge	Obverse	Reverse	minting	issue	withdrawal	lapse
	50 sum	18.0 mm	2.0g	Nickel-plated steel	Plain	Denomination	National emblem of Uzbekistan, year of minting	2018	2 July 2018	Current	
	100 sum	20.0 mm	2.5 g	Nickel-plated steel	Plain	Independence and Goodness monument, Tashkent	National emblem of Uzbekistan, year of minting	2018	2 July 2018	Current	
	200 sum	22.0 mm	3.3 g	Nickel-plated steel	Plain	Detail of a tiger mosaic on the Sher-Dor Madrasah at the Registan in Samarkand	National emblem of Uzbekistan, year of minting	2018	2 July 2018	Current	
	500 sum	24.0 mm	3.9 g	Nickel-plated steel	Plain	Palace of Conventions (Anjumanlar Saroyi) in Tashkent	National emblem of Uzbekistan, year of minting	2018	2 July 2018	Current	
These images are to scale at 2.5 pixels per millimetre. For table standards, see the coin specification table.

Third series (2022)
Image	Value	Technical parameters			Description			Date of			
Image	Value	Diameter	Mass	Composition	Edge	Obverse	Reverse	minting	issue	withdrawal	lapse
	1,000 sum	26.27 mm	7.3 g	Brass-plated copper center in a nickel ring	Plain	Center of Islamic Civilization (Islom Sivilzatsiyasi Markazi) in Tashkent	National emblem of Uzbekistan, year of minting	2022	26 December 2022	Current	
These images are to scale at 2.5 pixels per millimetre. For table standards, see the coin specification table.

=== Banknotes ===
The second and current series, issued by the Central Bank of the Republic of Uzbekistan, was released in 1994 in denominations of 1, 3, 5, 10, 25, 50, and 100 sum. A 200 sum banknote was issued in 1997, the 500 sum in 1999, the 1,000 sum in 2001, the 5,000 sum in 2013, the 10,000 sum on 10 March 2017, the 50,000 sum on 22 August 2017 and the 100,000 sum on 25 February 2019. The latter four denominations feature inscriptions in Latin-based Uzbek as opposed to Uzbek Cyrillic in banknotes of 1 to 1,000 Uzbek sum. On 14 June 2021, the Central Bank of the Republic of Uzbekistan issued the 2,000 and 20,000 sum banknotes to help bridge the gap between 1,000 and 5,000 sum as well as 10,000 and 50,000 sum. On 18 June 2021, the Central Bank of the Republic of Uzbekistan issued new 5,000 and 10,000 sum banknotes, utilizing the design templates of the 2,000 and 20,000 sum banknotes. In that same year, the Central Bank of the Republic of Uzbekistan issued new 50,000 and 100,000 sum banknotes as part of a new series of banknotes first introduced with the 2,000 and 20,000 sum banknotes. An entirely new 200,000 sum banknote was issued on 15 July 2022.

1994-2019 Series
Image		Value	Main Colour	Description		Date of printing	Date of first issue	withdrawal
Obverse	Reverse	Value	Main Colour	Obverse	Reverse	Date of printing	Date of first issue	withdrawal
		1 sum	Green and pink	National emblem of Uzbekistan	Alisher Navoi Opera and Ballet Theater in Tashkent	1994	1 July 1994	1 March 2020
		3 sum	Red and green	National emblem of Uzbekistan	Chashma-Ayub Mausoleum in Bukhara	1994	1 July 1994	1 March 2020
		5 sum	Blue and orange	National emblem of Uzbekistan and Islamic pattern	Alisher Navoi Monument in Tashkent	1994	1 July 1994	1 March 2020
		10 sum	Purple and blue	National emblem of Uzbekistan and Islamic pattern	Gur-e Amir in Samarkand	1994	1 July 1994	1 March 2020
		25 sum	Blue and pink	National emblem of Uzbekistan and Islamic pattern	Shah-i-Zinda Complex in Samarkand	1994	1 July 1994	1 March 2020
		50 sum	Brown and orange	National emblem of Uzbekistan and Islamic pattern	The three Madrasahs of the Registan in Samarkand	1994	1 July 1994	1 July 2019
		100 sum	Purple and blue	National emblem of Uzbekistan and Islamic pattern	Palace of Friendship of Peoples in Tashkent	1994	1 July 1994	1 July 2019
		200 sum	Green and some blue	National emblem of Uzbekistan	Detail of a tiger mosaic (Shir o Khorshid) on the Sherdor Madrasah at the Registan in Samarkand	1997	1 March 1997	1 July 2020
		500 sum	Red and some green	National emblem of Uzbekistan	Statue of Amir Temur (Tamerlane) in Tashkent	1999	1 June 2000	1 July 2020
		1,000 sum	Grey	National emblem of Uzbekistan	Amir Timur Museum in Tashkent	2001	1 September 2001	Current
		5,000 sum	Green	National emblem of Uzbekistan	National Assembly (Oliy Majlis) in Tashkent	2013	1 July 2013	Current
		10,000 sum	Blue	National emblem of Uzbekistan	Senate (Senat) in Tashkent	2017	10 March 2017	Current
		50,000 sum	Violet	National emblem of Uzbekistan; top of the “Ezgulik” ark in Independence Square in Tashkent	Palace of Conventions (Anjumanlar Saroyi) in Tashkent	2017	22 August 2017	Current
		100,000 sum	Orange and light brown	National emblem of Uzbekistan; Mirzo Ulugbek; solar system	Mirzo Ulugbek Observatory in Samarkand; map of Uzbekistan	2019	25 February 2019	Current
These images are to scale at 0.7 pixel per millimetre (18 pixel per inch). For table standards, see the banknote specification table.

2021–2022 series
Image		Value	Dimensions	Main colour	Description			Date of		Ref.
Obverse	Reverse	Value	Dimensions	Main colour	Obverse	Reverse	Watermark	printing	issue	Ref.
		2,000 sum	142 × 69 mm	Red	Bukhara Arch, caravan routes on map of Uzbekistan, Honatlas textile patterns, National emblem of Uzbekistan	Varahsha ruins of the ancient caravan route Poykend, clay pot and artifact, camel	Camel and "2000"	2021	14 June 2021	
		5,000 sum	142 × 69 mm	Green	Sherdor madrasasi in Samarkand, National emblem of Uzbekistan	Archaeological Monuments of Afrosiyob belonging to the 8th-5th centuries BC, Archeological find of a 10th-century pottery jug and an embossed ceramic bowl found in the ruins of Afrosiyob	Camel and "5000"	2021	20 August 2021	
		10,000 sum	147 × 69 mm	Blue	Great Silk Road, Architectural monument Kokaldosh madrasasi in Tashkent, National emblem of Uzbekistan	Oldest monument in the territory of Tashkent, which dates back to the 1st century BC - Shoshtepa archaeological monument, Ancient ceramics of Tashkent, pottery of 10th-12th century, and household utensils of the 10th century	Camel and "10000"	2021	20 August 2021	
		20,000 sum	147 × 69 mm	Indigo	Koi Krylgan Kala archeology site, caravan routes on map of Uzbekistan, textile patterns, National emblem of Uzbekistan	6th-century pottery from Aral and Caspian Seas, embroidery design	Camel and "20000"	2021	14 June 2021	
		50,000 sum	147 × 69 mm	Purple	Al-Hakim At-Termiziy Maqbarasi in Surxondaryo, caravan routes on map of Uzbekistan, National emblem of Uzbekistan	Fayoztepa Arxeologiya Yodgorligi ancient archaeological monument in Surxondaryo, flying dove, 17th-century pottery from Sopollitepa	Camel and "50000"	2021	22 December 2021	
		100,000 sum	152 × 69 mm	Orange	Ichan Qal’a museum in Khiva, Khorezm, caravan routes on map of Uzbekistan, National emblem of Uzbekistan	Angkaqal’a Archeologiya Yodgorligi fortress in Khorezm, 1st-century BC silver coin, 10th-century pottery from Khorezm	Camel and "100000"	2021	22 December 2021	
		200,000 sum	152 × 69 mm	Cyan	Xudoyorxon O’rdasi (Khan’s Palace) in Kokand, Fergana, caravan routes on map of Uzbekistan, National emblem of Uzbekistan	Axsikent Arxeologiya Yodgorligi (ancient archaeological monument) in ancient Fergana, pomegranate, double-headed snake and ceramic bowl	Camel and "200000"	2022	15 July 2022	
These images are to scale at 0.7 pixel per millimetre (18 pixel per inch). For table standards, see the banknote specification table.

=== Exchange rates ===
At its introduction on 1 July 1994, 1 US dollar was equal to 25 sum.

==== 2017 reform ====
On 2 September 2017, President of Uzbekistan Shavkat Mirziyoyev issued a decree "On priority measures of liberalizing foreign exchange policy". The reform took effect on 5 September 2017. The currency was untethered from its US dollar peg and started to float. As a result the sum's exchange rate to the US dollar increased from 4,210 Uzbek sum to 8,100 Uzbek sum. The new rate was even weaker than the sum's black-market convertibility of about 7,700 to the dollar. Restrictions on the amount of foreign currencies individuals and companies could buy were also abolished on the same day.

From February 1, 2018 to February 1, 2025 the exchange rate for the US Dollar rose from 8175 to 12957 Sum (UZS) per USD. This corresponded to an era of Uzbek double digit inflation. However, by February 1, 2026 the rate had dipped to 12199.

Current UZS exchange rates
From Google Finance:	AUD CAD CHF CNY EUR GBP HKD JPY USD
From Yahoo! Finance:	AUD CAD CHF CNY EUR GBP HKD JPY USD
From XE.com:	AUD CAD CHF CNY EUR GBP HKD JPY USD
From OANDA:	AUD CAD CHF CNY EUR GBP HKD JPY USD

== See also ==
- Economy of Uzbekistan

Earlier currencies

- Bukharan tenga
- Kokand tenga
- Khwarazmi tenga

== Sources ==
- Krause, Chester L.; Clifford Mishler (2003). Colin R. Bruce II (ed.). 2004 Standard Catalog of World Coins: 1901–Present (31st ed.). Krause Publications. ISBN 0873495934.
- Cuhaj, George S., ed. (2005). Standard Catalog of World Paper Money: Modern Issues 1961-Date (11th ed.). Krause Publications. ISBN 0-89689-160-7.
