= Flag of the Karakalpak Autonomous Soviet Socialist Republic =

Flag

Karakalpak Autonomous Soviet Socialist Republic
- Flag of the Karakalpak ASSR (1978–1992)
- Use: Civil and state flag
- Proportion: 1:2
- Adopted: 12 June 1954; 27 October 1978 (minor changes)
- Design: A triband flag with the colors (from top to bottom) red, blue, and red, with the blue band fimbriated in white, with a golden hammer and sickle in the upper canton.

The flag of the Karakalpak Autonomous Soviet Socialist Republic was adopted in 1954 by the government of the Karakalpak Autonomous Soviet Socialist Republic. The flag is nearly identical to the flag of the Uzbek Soviet Socialist Republic. The former Karakalpak ASSR had its own flag from 1934 to its dissolution in 1992, which developed similarly to that of the Uzbek SSR. Basic design of the flag was always a red cloth with inscription.

== History ==
=== First version ===
The 2nd Congress of Soviets of the Karakalpak Autonomous Soviet Socialist Republic from 21 until 25 December 1934 adopted the Constitution of the Karakalpak ASSR. The flag of the Karakalpak ASSR was described in the Article 109 of the constitution.

The state flag of the Karakalpak Autonomous Soviet Socialist Republic consists of a panel of red (scarlet) color, rectangular, with a ratio of length to width - as two to one. In the left corner of the flag, near the pole there are golden letters "RSFSR" and "Karakalpak ASSR" - in Karakalpak and Russian languages.

— Constitution of the Karakalpak Autonomous Soviet Socialist Republic (1934), Article 109

=== Second version ===
On December 5, 1936, the Karakalpak ASSR became part of the Uzbek SSR. The new state symbols was approved in the Constitution, adopted by the 3rd Extraordinary Congress of Soviets of the Karakalpak Autonomous Soviet Socialist Republic in October 1936, and approved by the Presidium of the Central Executive Committee of the Uzbek SSR on September 29, 1937. The flag of the Karakalpak ASSR was described in the Article 111 of the constitution.

The state flag of the Karakalpak Autonomous Soviet Socialist Republic is the state flag of the Uzbek SSR, consisting of a red cloth, in the left corner of which, at the top of the tree, are placed the golden letters “Uzbek SSR” in Uzbek, with the letters under the inscription “Uzbek SSR” the inscription "KaraKalpak ASSR" in Karakalpak language.

— Constitution of the Karakalpak Autonomous Soviet Socialist Republic (1936), Article 111

==== Revision ====
In accordance with the official change of the writing system of the Uzbek language on 8 May 1940.

== Gallery ==
Flag of the Khanate of Khiva (from the Middle Ages to 1917)

Flag of the Khanate of Khiva (1917–1920)

Flag of the Turkestan Autonomous Soviet Socialist Republic (1919–1921)

Flag of Turkestan ASSR (1921–1924)

Flag of the Khorezm People's Soviet Republic (January 1920–April 30, 1920)

Flag of the Khorezm People's Soviet Republic (April 30, 1920–July 1922)

Flag of the Khorezm People's Soviet Republic (July 1922–October 23, 1923)

Flag of the Khorezm People's Soviet Republic (October 23, 1923 – October 2, 1924)

Flag of the Kirghiz Autonomous Socialist Soviet Republic (1920–1925)

Flag of the Uzbek Soviet Socialist Republic (July 22, 1925 – January 9, 1926)

Flag of the Uzbek Soviet Socialist Republic (January 9, 1926 – 1931)

Flag of the Uzbek Soviet Socialist Republic (1931-January 1935)

Flag of the Uzbek Soviet Socialist Republic (January 1935 – 1937)

Flag of the Uzbek Soviet Socialist Republic (1937–January 16, 1941)

Flag of the Uzbek Soviet Socialist Republic (January 16, 1941 – August 29, 1952)

Flag of the Karakalpak Autonomous Soviet Socialist Republic (1934–1937)

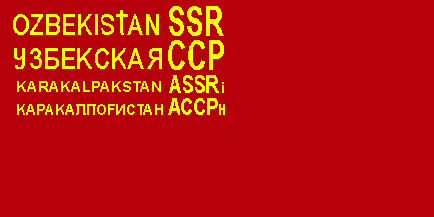
Flag of the Karakalpak Autonomous Soviet Socialist Republic (1937–1941)

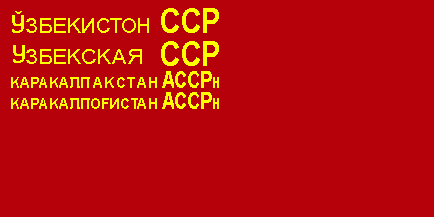
Flag of the Karakalpak Autonomous Soviet Socialist Republic (1941–1952)

Flag of the Karakalpak Autonomous Soviet Socialist Republic (1952–1992)

== See also ==
- Emblem of the Karakalpak Autonomous Soviet Socialist Republic
- Flag of Karakalpakstan
- Flag of the Uzbek Soviet Socialist Republic
