= Amanbai Orynbaev =

Chairman of the Supreme Council of Karakalpakstan

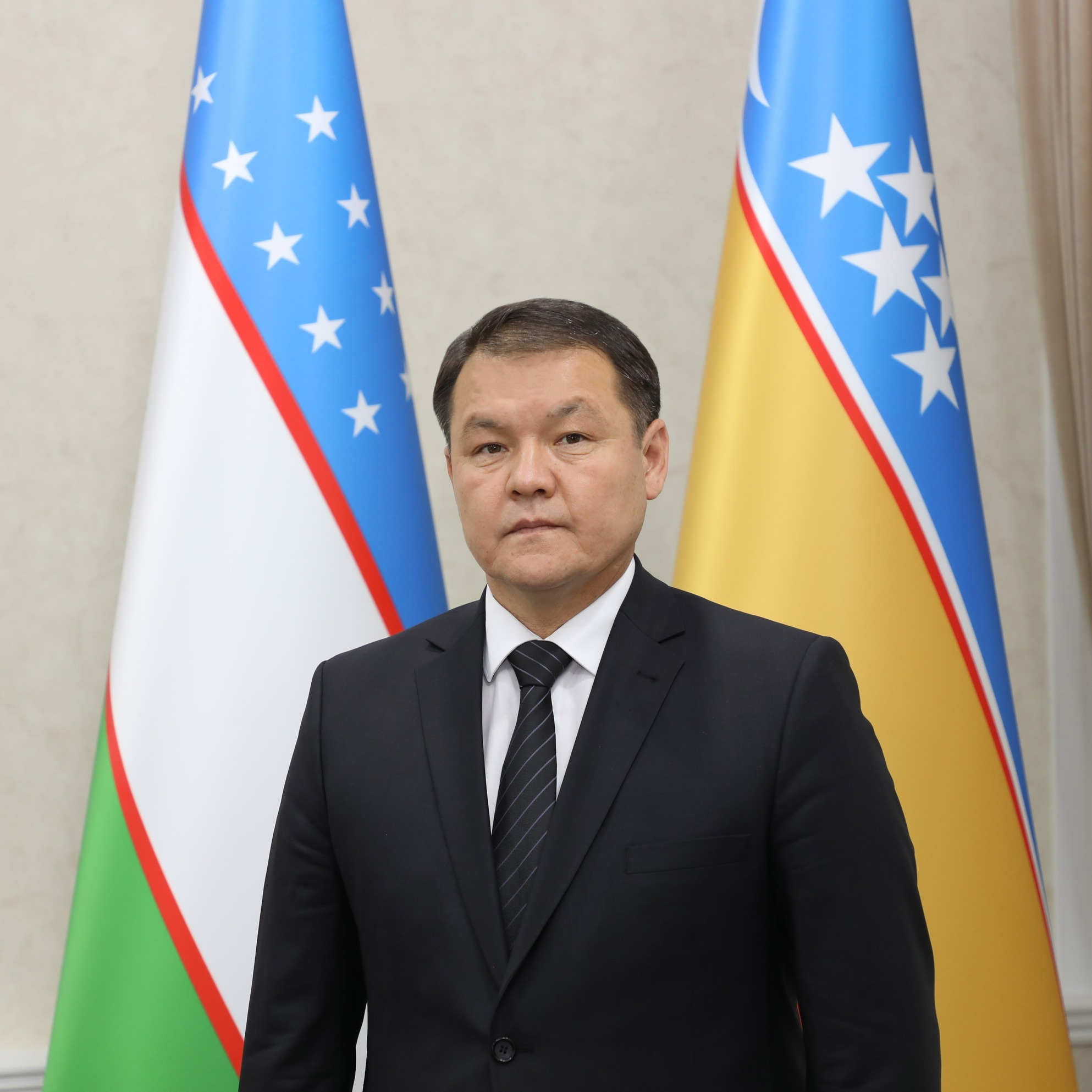
- Official portrait, 2022

Chairman of the Supreme Council of Karakalpakstan
- Incumbent
- Assumed office 26 August 2022
- President: Shavkat Mirziyoyev
- Prime Minister: Abdulla Aripov
- Preceded by: Murat Kamalov

Personal details
- Born: Amanbai Tlewbaevich Orynbaev; 17 September 1979 (age 47) Kegeyli District, Uzbekistan, Soviet Union
- Education: In 2002 he graduated from the Academy of the Ministry of Internal Affairs of the Republic of Uzbekistan. In 2004, a master's degree at the Academy of the Ministry of Internal Affairs of the Republic of Uzbekistan. In 2011 - the Higher School of Strategic Analysis and Prospects of the Republic of Uzbekistan.
- Profession: Lawyer and Political scientist.
- Website: Official site

Orynbaev Amanbai Tlewbaevich (Uzbek: Orinbayev Amanbay Tlewbay og'li, Karakalpak: Orınbaev Amanbay Tlewbay uli; born September 17, 1979) is a Karakalpak-Uzbek statesman and politician, chairman of the Jokargy Kenes of the Republic of Karakalpakstan since August 26, 2022, and concurrently deputy head of the Senate of the Republic of Uzbekistan.

== Early life ==
Amanbai Orinbaev was born on 17 September 1979, in the Kegeyli region of Karakalpak ASSR, then part of the Soviet Union.

== Lobar activities ==
Minister of Internal Affairs of the Republic of Karakalpakstan 2022-2022, Minister of Internal Affairs of the Republic of Uzbekistan - First Deputy Chairman of the Council of Ministers of the Republic of Karakalpakstan on ecology and development of the Aral Sea region.

Since 26 August 2022 - Chairman of Jokargy Kenes of the Republic of Karakalpakstan.

== Other Link ==
- Official site Jokargi kenes
- Official instagram account Amanbai Orinbayev
