= Flag of Karakalpakstan =

Karakalpakstan
- Use: Civil and state flag, civil and state ensign
- Proportion: 1:2
- Adopted: 14 December 1992; 33 years ago
- Designed by: Zhollybai Izentaev

The state flag of Karakalpakstan (Note: Karakalpak: Qaraqalpaqstan Respublikasınıń mámleketlik bayraǵi / Қарақалпақстан Республикасының мәмлекетлик байрағи; Uzbek: Qoraqalpogʻiston Respublikasining davlat bayrogʻi / Қорақалпоғистон Республикасининг давлат байроғи) is one of the official symbols (along with the emblem and anthem) of Karakalpakstan, an autonomous republic within Uzbekistan. It was designed from a sketch by Karakalpak artist Zhollybai Izentaev. The flag of Karakalpakstan is based on the flag of Uzbekistan.

It consists of three equally horizontal bands of blue, yellow, and green separated by a narrow red and a narrower white band. On the hoist side of the flag, in the blue stripe, are a white crescent moon and five white stars. The colors of the flag symbolize Islam, fertility, agriculture, renewal of nature, spirituality, and trust (green), water, spring and sky (blue), peace, prosperity and harmony (white) and the Karakalpak people and its deserts (yellow). The stars and crescent represent Muslims, and the five stars are a symbol of Karakalpakstan's five oldest cities.

During the time of the Soviet Union, promotion of a Karakalpak identity was opposed. After the independence of Uzbekistan, the Karakalpaks were granted more freedoms, including the right to fly their own flag. While the area also had its own flag under Soviet rule, it had the standard pattern of a Soviet flag.

== Design specifications ==
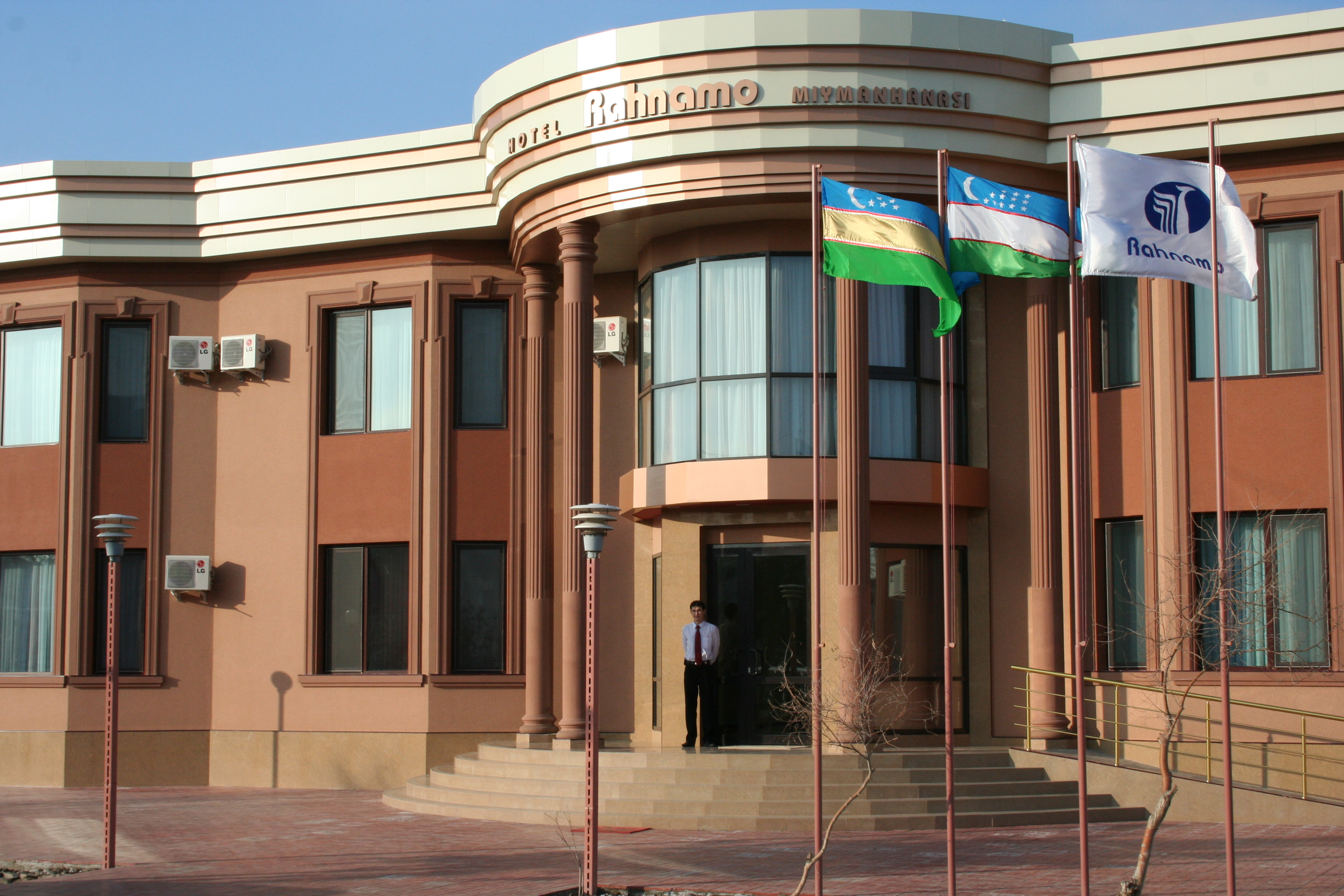
The flag of Karakalpakstan alongside the flag of Uzbekistan, in front of a hotel in Nukus

The flag consists of three horizontal stripes of blue, golden (or yellow) and green colors. The gold band is separated by borders of white and red. It is 250 cm long and 125 cm wide. The width of the blue and green stripes are equal to each other and is 42 cm. The width of the golden color band, located in the middle of the flag, is 34 cm. The width of the white borders is 1 cm and the width of the red borders is 2.5 cm.

On the upper blue band is a white crescent moon (convex side facing the flag's staff) and on its right side are five five-pointed white stars. The crescent is formed by the intersection of two circles with diameters of 22 and 19 cm. The centers of these circles lie on a line that divides the blue stripe into two equal parts. The distance between the centers of these circles is 4 cm. The distance from the flagstaff to the crescent is 20 cm. The stars are inscribed in a rectangle 30 cm by 15 cm. The distance from the flagstaff to the rectangle is 42 cm. The stars are arranged in two rows as follows: the upper row consists of two and the lower row consists of three stars; each star is inscribed in a circle 10 cm in diameter. The lower point of the crescent and the vertices of the rays of the lower row of stars touch the horizontal line located 10 cm from the upper white stripe.

=== Colors ===
System	Blue	White	Red	Yellow	Green
CMYK	100-21-0-27	0-0-0-0	0-85-89-14	0-22-85-3	83-0-64-38
RGB	0-143-184	255-255-255	219-32-23	247-190-36	26-157-55
Hexadecimal	#008FB8	#FFFFFF	#DB2017	#F7BE24	#1A9D37

== Gallery ==
Flag of the Khanate of Khiva (from the Middle Ages to 1917)

Flag of the Khanate of Khiva (1917–1920)

Flag of the Turkestan Autonomous Soviet Socialist Republic (1919–1921)

Flag of Turkestan ASSR (1921–1924)

Flag of the Khorezm People's Soviet Republic (January 1920–April 30, 1920)

Flag of the Khorezm People's Soviet Republic (April 30, 1920–May 1921)

Flag of the Khorezm People's Soviet Republic (May 1921–July 1922)

Flag of the Khorezm People's Soviet Republic (July 1922–October 23, 1923)

Flag of the Khorezm People's Soviet Republic (October 23, 1923 – October 2, 1924)

Flag of the Kirghiz Autonomous Socialist Soviet Republic (1920–1925)

Flag of the Uzbek Soviet Socialist Republic (July 22, 1925 – January 9, 1926)

Flag of the Uzbek Soviet Socialist Republic (January 9, 1926 – 1931)

Flag of the Uzbek Soviet Socialist Republic (1931-January 1935)

Flag of the Uzbek Soviet Socialist Republic (January 1935 – 1937)

Flag of the Uzbek Soviet Socialist Republic (1937–January 16, 1941)

Flag of the Uzbek Soviet Socialist Republic (January 16, 1941 – August 29, 1952)

Flag of the Karakalpak Autonomous Soviet Socialist Republic (1934–1937)

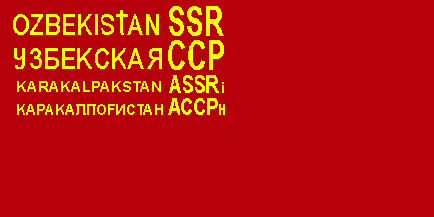
Flag of the Karakalpak Autonomous Soviet Socialist Republic (1937–1941)

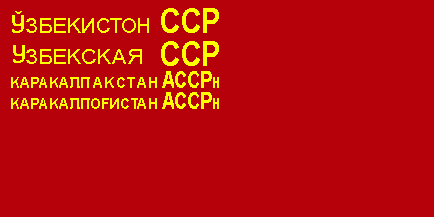
Flag of the Karakalpak Autonomous Soviet Socialist Republic (1941–1952)

Flag of the Karakalpak Autonomous Soviet Socialist Republic (1952–1992)

== See also ==
- Emblem of Karakalpakstan
- Flag of Uzbekistan
