= Amin Tojiyev =

Uzbek politician (1947–2026)

Amin Tojiev

Chairman of the Council of Ministers of Karakalpakstan
- In office October 1998 – 10 July 2002
- Preceded by: Saparbay Avezmatov
- Succeeded by: Tursinbay Tanirbergenov

Chairman of the Council of Ministers of the Karakalpak Autonomous Soviet Socialist Republic
- In office July 1989 – January 1992
- Preceded by: Sagʻindiq Nietullaev
- Succeeded by: Rejepbay Yoʻldoshev

Personal details
- Born: 12 April 1947 Tórtkúl District, Karakalpak ASSR, Uzbek SSR, Soviet Union
- Died: 4 June 2026 (aged 79)
- Party: CPSU (until 1991)
- Occupation: Civil servant

Amin Xamraevich Tojiev (12 April 1947 – 4 June 2026) was an Uzbek politician. He served as chairman of the Council of Ministers of the Karakalpak Autonomous Soviet Socialist Republic from 1989 to 1992 and chairman of the Council of Ministers of Karakalpakstan from 1998 to 2002.

Tojiev died on 4 June 2026, at the age of 79.
