= Emblem of Uzbekistan =

- Emblem of Uzbekistan

Versions
- With cyrillic text
- Armiger: Republic of Uzbekistan
- Adopted: 2 July 1992
- Supporters: Khumo
- Motto: O‘ZBEKISTON

The State Emblem of Uzbekistan was formally adopted on 2 July 1992 by the Government of Uzbekistan. It bears many similarities to the emblem of the former Uzbek Soviet Socialist Republic, which the Republic of Uzbekistan succeeded. Like many other post-Soviet republics whose symbols do not predate the October Revolution, the current emblem retains some components of the Soviet one. Prior to 1992, Uzbekistan had an emblem similar to all other Soviet Republics, with standard communist emblems and insignia.

The emblem displays the natural wealth of the country. On the left there is a cotton plant, which has been immensely important to the country's industry and agriculture since the Soviet era as the Uzbek SSR was one of the main producers and suppliers of cotton in the entirety of the USSR, thus it is often called the white gold symbolizing its sheer significance. To the right is a wreath of wheat ears, symbolizing the country's wealth and prosperity. Together, both cotton and wheat plants are intertwined with the ribbon of the state flag, which portrays the peace and consolation of different peoples and ethnic groups living within the republic.

It is surmounted by the blue star of Rub El Hizb (۞) with white star and crescent inside, a symbol of Islam, which a majority of Uzbeks profess.

In the center, a right-facing Huma (or Khumo) is displayed with outstretched wings. This legendary bird symbolizes peace, happiness and striving for freedom. Enclosed by the Huma's wings is a depiction of the rising sun over mountains, overlooking green pastures. Two rivers, the Amu Darya and Syr Darya, flow from the mountains and crepuscular rays emanate from the rising sun at the rear of the emblem.

The Khumo is perched on a banner at the base of the cotton and wheat borders which bears the national colors and the name of the country in Latin script (Oʻzbekiston).

Karakalpakstan, an autonomous republic within Uzbekistan uses an emblem based on Uzbekistan's, but featuring the regional colors blue, gold, and green. It features only one river, the Amu Darya, along with a local monument at the background of the emblem, adjacent to the mountains.

== History ==
Prior to the October Revolution and the subsequent establishment of the Soviet regime in the country, the local khanates and emirates such as the Emirate of Bukhara and the Khanate of Khiva that gave way to the Uzbek Soviet Socialist Republic, lacked the coat of arms in the western sense of the word, with the local states using more traditional ways of self-representation and symbols of governance.

=== Bukharan People's Republic ===
Bukharan People's Soviet Republic on the map of the U.S.S.R marked in green, circa 1922

On September 1, 1920, the Young Bukharians and bukharan communists started a revolt in the city of Charjow supported by the RSFSR, against the emir of Bukhara Mohammed Alim Khan and the government of the Emirate. On the second September, the bolsheviks and their allies captured the city after heavy aerial bombardment and an effective destruction of numerous parts of the city. Emir of Bukhara and his court first fled to the Eastern Bukhara and subsequently into Afghanistan.

14 September 1920 marked the date when a republican form of government was adopted and all the related government institutions were established. On October 8, during the All-Bukharan Kurultai, formation of the Bukharan People's Soviet Republic was announced, followed by an adoption of a constitution on 23 September of the next year, by the same congressional body, the kurultai.

Emblem of the Bukharan People's Soviet Republic

The 78th Article of the constitution of Bukharan P.S.R. was as follows:

The Government emblem of the Bukharan People's Soviet Republic consists of a depiction of a green sheaf of dzhugara with a golden sickle thrust into it on the red background. At the upper part of the emblem, a sickle of a half crescent is placed above the sheaf, inside of which is a golden five-pointed star. The sheaf itself is surrounded by the inscription of "Bukharan People's Soviet Republic".

— Central Government Archive of the Republic of Uzbekistan.

=== Uzbek S.S.R ===
The original emblem of the Uzbek SSR from 1925

On 13–15 February 1925, in the city of Bukhara, the first Uzbek Congress of the Soviets issued a declaration about the establishment of the Uzbek Soviet Socialist Republic. And 22 June 1925, the Central Executive Committee of the Soviets of the Uzbek SSR adopted a resolution No.67 Concerning the emblem and the flag of the Uzbek SSR, which temporarily, until the establishment of the Constitution of the Uzbek SSR. established the emblem of the republic.

The project of the emblem taken as basis of the final design consisted of depictions of uraq (a sickle) and a hammer criss-cross with the handles down and surrounded by a wreath of ears and branches of cotton. The red ribbon, surrounding the wreath, is adorned with the inscription Uz.S.S.R (in the Arabic script of the Uzbek language and in Russian. A red star with a golden borders is located at the upper side of the emblem; the emblem is surrounded with the inscription, both in Russian and Uzbek, of the communist motto: "Proletarians of the world, unite!".

In 1927–1928, a series of reforms were made to change the writing system of the Uzbek language into a Latinized alphabet, known as Yañalif, intended as a singular alphabet for all the Turkic Languages of the USSR. In accordance with this, the inscription on the coat of arms was altered, in order to reflect the current reforms. Furthermore, several smaller changes were implemented due to the secession of Tajikistan as a separate republic within the Soviet Union in 1929 and separation of the Tajik Soviet Socialist Republic from the Uzbek Soviet Socialist Republic.

Emblem of the Uzbek SSR from 1929 to 1937

On July 11, 1939, a decree was issued by the Central Government of the Soviet Union, as to alter the alphabets of several republics within the union into the cyrillic script. Thus, on 8 May 1940, the Uzbek script was changed from Latin alphabet, into the new Cyrillic one, based on Russian. On 16 January 1941, the emblem of the republic followed suit, and it too, switched its inscription from Latin script to Cyrillic. Hence, the coat of arms got a new insignia of «Ӯз.С.С.Р.» in the place of the old Latin one.

Emblem of the Uzbek SSR, as prescribed in the 1978 Constitution

Further down the line, in the new constitution of 19 April 1978, a new description of the emblem was given, which brought forth several alterations to the design. The article 178. read thusly:

Government Emblem of the Uzbek Soviet Socialist Republic consists of the hammer and sickle in the rays of sun, surrounded by a wreath, on the right consisting of ears of wheat and on the right, of a branch of cotton plant with flowers and open buds of cotton. On the top of the emblem is a five-pointed star and at the bottom, a part of the world globe. On the ribbon of the wreath are the inscriptions; Uzbek on the left: «Бутун дунё пролетарлари, бирлашингиз» and Russian on the right: «Пролетарии всех стран, соединяйтесь!». At the bottom of the two ribbons is the inscription «Ўз.ССР».

— Constitution of the Uzbek SSR (1978)

This version of the emblem survived until the Dissolution of the Soviet Union, when a new coat of arms, along with other state insignia such as a flag was adopted, for the newly independent Republic of Uzbekistan.

=== Post Independence ===
The current state emblem of Uzbekistan approved by the 10th session of the Supreme Council of Uzbekistan on 2 July 1992 in accordance with the law No. 616-XII "About the State emblem of the Republic of Uzbekistan".

== The symbolism ==
In the centre of the emblem depicts Khumo with wings spread—in Uzbek mythology, the symbol of happiness and freedom. Uzbek poet Alisher Navoi characterized the bird Humo as the kindest of all living beings.

In the upper part of the emblem is an octagon, symbolizing the unity and the confirmation of the republic. The crescent and star inside the eight-pointed star are the sacred symbols of Islam.

The image of the sun symbolizes the light that illuminates the path of the Uzbek state, whilst the flourishing valley emphasizes the unique and favorable natural and climatic conditions of the Republic.

Two rivers, run through the valley, representing the Amu-Darya and Syr-Darya, which flow through the territory of Uzbekistan.

The ears of wheat are the symbol of bread, and mark the wealth and prosperity of the republic, with open cotton boxes characterizing the previously vital cotton industry of Uzbekistan. Together, wheat and cotton boxes entwined with ribbon of the tricolor of national flag, symbolize the consolidation of the peoples living in the Republic.

== Gallery ==
Presidential Seal of Uzbekistan

Emblem of Karakalpakstan

An Uzbek passport with the national emblem displayed on the front

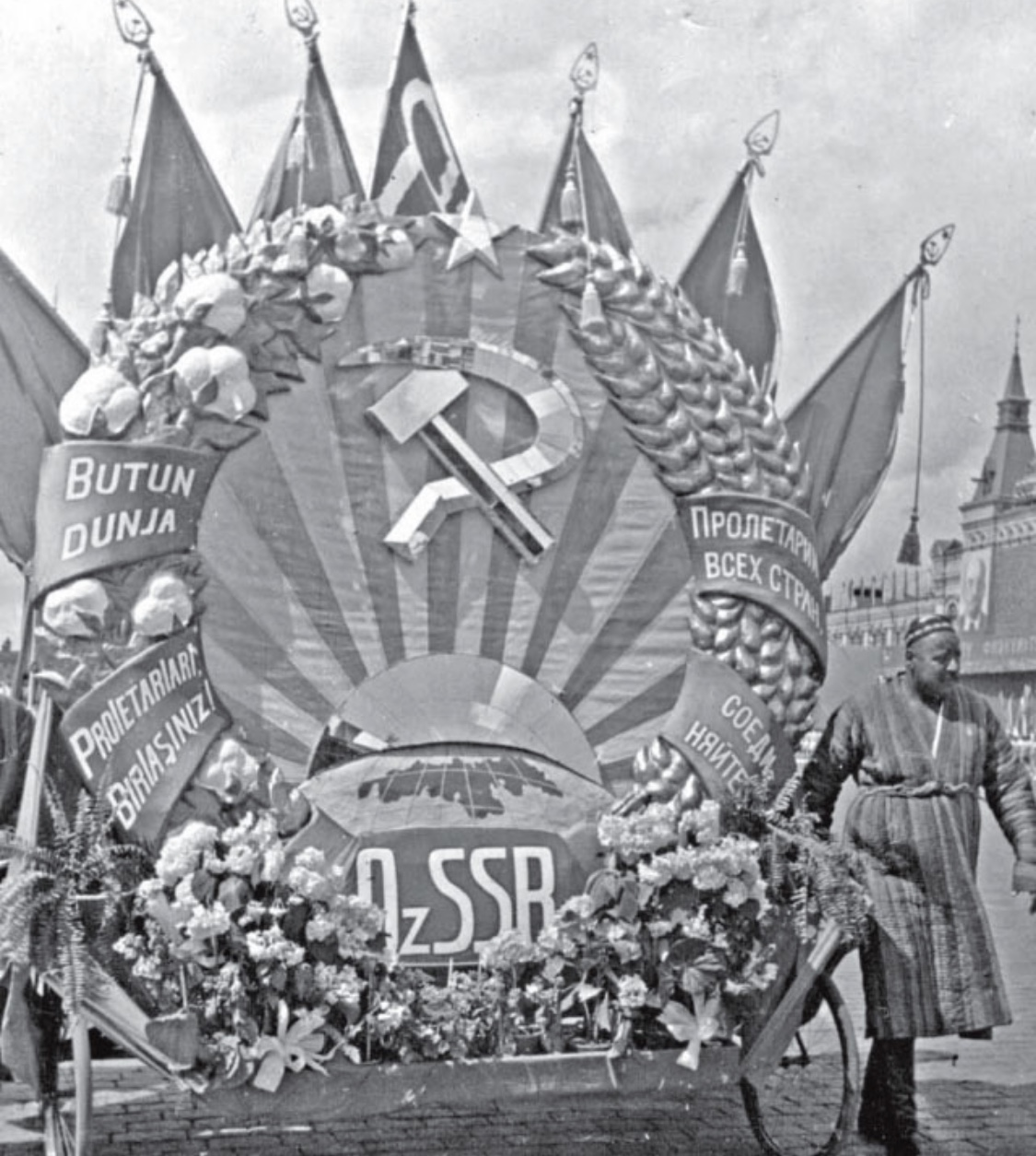
The Soviet Emblem in the Latin script, during a parade in Moscow

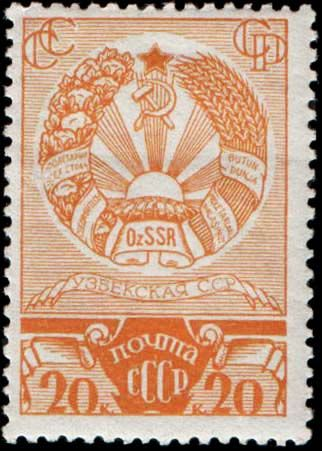
A Soviet stamp with the Emblem of the Uzbek SSR
