= List of chairmen of the Supreme Council of Karakalpakstan =

Chairman of the Supreme Council of the Republic of Karakalpakstan
- Qaraqalpaqstan Respublikası Joqarǵı Keńesiniń Baslıǵı
- Flag of Karakalpakstan

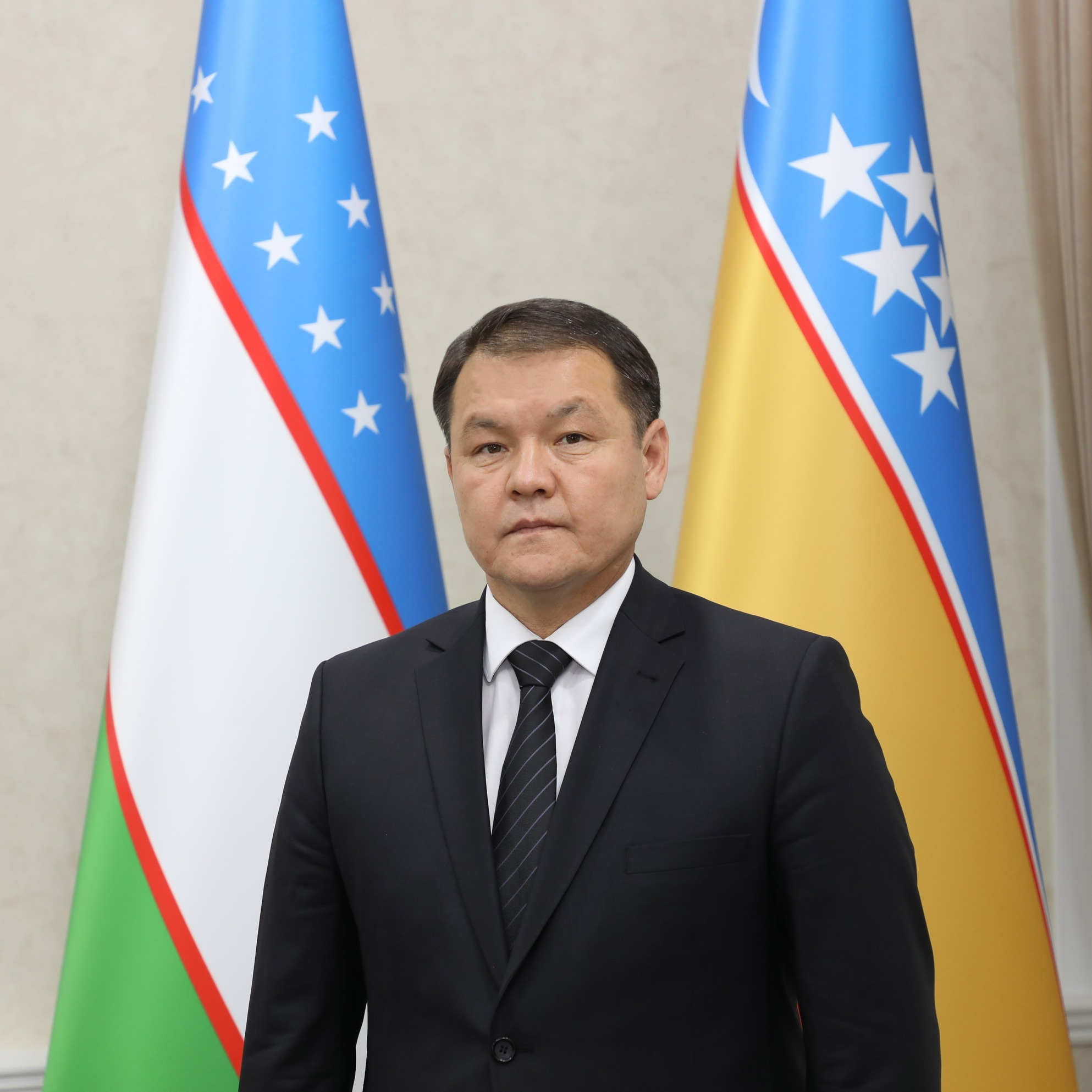
- Incumbent; Amanbai Orynbaev since 26 August 2022
- Style: "Mr. Chairman"
- Member of: Council of Ministers
- Seat: Nukus
- Nominator: Largest political party (or bloc of parties) in parliament.
- Appointer: The president with Jokargi Kenes' advice and consent
- Precursor: President of Karakalpakstan
- Inaugural holder: Tursun Eshimbeyova
- Formation: 1990; May 1992 (current form)

The chairman of the Supreme Council of the Republic of Karakalpakstan (Karakalpak: Qaraqalpaqstan Respublikası Joqarǵı Keńesiniń Baslıǵı; Uzbek: Qoraqalpogʻiston Respublikasi Joʻqorgʻi Kenges raisi) is highest state position and the head of the Republic of Karakalpakstan. They chair the Supreme Council of Karakalpakstan. It was preceded by the office of President of the Republic and Chairman of the Supreme Soviet before that. The current chairman is Amanbai Orynbaev since August 2022.

== List ==
| | Name | Entered office | Left office | Ref |
Chairmen of the Supreme Soviet
| 1 | Tursun Eshimbeyova | 1990 | January 1991 | |
| 2 | Dauletbay Shamshetov | January 1991 | November 1991 | |
Presidents of Karalpakastan
| 1 | Dauletbay Shamshetov | November 1991 | May 1992 | |
Chairmen of the Supreme Council
| 1 | Urbiniyaz Ashirbekov | May 1992 | July 17, 1997 | |
| 2 | Temur Kamolov | July 17, 1997 | May 3, 2002 | |
| 3 | Musa Yerniyazov | May 3, 2002 | July 31, 2020 | |
| 4 | Atabek Davletov (Note: Became acting Chairman following the death of his predecessor) | July 31, 2020 | October 2, 2020 | |
| 5 | Murat Kamalov | October 2, 2020 | August 26, 2022 | |
| 6 | Amanbai Orynbaev | August 26, 2022 | present | |

== Sources ==
- World Statesmen.org
