= Flag of the Uzbek Soviet Socialist Republic =

Uzbek Soviet Socialist Republic
- Use: Civil and state flag, civil and state ensign
- Proportion: 1:2
- Adopted: 29 August 1952
- Relinquished: 18 November 1991
- Design: A triband flag with the colors (from top to bottom) red, blue, and red, with the blue band frimbrated in white, with a golden hammer and sickle in the upper canton.
- Designed by: Anatoly Kuzmich Osheyko
- Reverse flag
- Use: Civil and state flag, civil and state ensign
- Flag of the Uzbek SSR (1991) and the Republic of Uzbekistan (1991–)
- Use: Civil and state flag, civil and state ensign
- Proportion: 1:2
- Adopted: 18 November 1991
- Design: A horizontal triband of azure, white and green, separated by two narrow red stripes. A white crescent and three rows of twelve white five-pointed stars are situated on the left side of the upper azure stripe.

The flag of the Uzbek Soviet Socialist Republic was adopted on 29 August 1952. The red represents the "revolutionary struggle of the working masses", the hammer and sickle represents the peasants' and workers' union, and the red star is the symbol of the communist party. There is no official explanation for the symbolic meanings of other elements. However, in some material the white stripes represent cotton, the blue band represents Amu Darya and irrigation in general.

Before that, from 9 January 1926, the flag was about the same, but with the country's name in Uzbek, Russian and Tajik.

The first flag was hoisted on 22 July 1925 and was red, with the country's name in Arabic and the Cyrillic characters УзССР in the top-left corner in gold. Between 1931 and 1937, the flag was very similar, but with the Uzbek abbreviation OzSSC, and its Russian equivalent: УзССР.

Between 14 February 1937 and the adoption of the flag in the 1940s, the flag was the same, but with the Uzbek country's name in Latin characters: "OZBEKISTAN SSR." In 1940, the flag was red with the country's name in both Uzbek (Ўзбекистон ССР, Oʻzbekiston SSR) and Russian (Узбекская ССР, Uzbekskaya SSR) languages in gold in the top-left corner.

The last Uzbek SSR flag was adopted on 29 August 1952. Although the flag is visually identical to the Soviet flag, the red panel has a light blue (azure) down the middle of the whole flag length. At the edges of the light blue stripes are narrow white. The blue stripe with white edges is 1/5 (one-fifth) of the flag width. The specification amendments were accepted on 27 September 1974 and 30 June 1981.

On 31 August 1991, the Uzbek SSR was renamed to the Republic of Uzbekistan and the flag remained in use until 18 November 1991.

== History ==
First version of the flag (22 July 1925 – 1927)

=== First version ===
On July 22, 1925, the Central Executive Committee (CEC) of the Soviets of the Uzbek SSR adopted Resolution No. 67 "On the Emblem and Flag of the Uzbek Soviet Socialist Republic". The resolution approved the first flag of the Uzbek SSR with the following description :

The state flag of the Uzbek Soviet Socialist Republic consists of a panel of red (scarlet) color, in the left corner of which, near the tree above, are placed the golden letters:

1. above (in Uzbek) – .ئوز.ئـ.شـ.جـ
2. below (in Russian) – Уз.С.С.Р

— On the Emblem and Flag of the Uzbek Soviet Socialist Republic (1925), Article 2

The 2nd All-Uzbek Congress of Soviets on March 31, 1927, adopted the Constitution of the Uzbek SSR, which was published on July 11, 1927. The flag is described in chapter 113:

The state flag of the Uzbek Soviet Socialist Republic consists of a panel of red (scarlet) color, in the left corner of which the golden letters are placed at the top:

1. above (in Uzbek) – .ئوز.ئـ.شـ.جـ
2. below (in Russian) – Уз.С.С.Р

The ratio of flag width to length is 1:2.

— Constitution of the Uzbek SSR (1927), Article 113

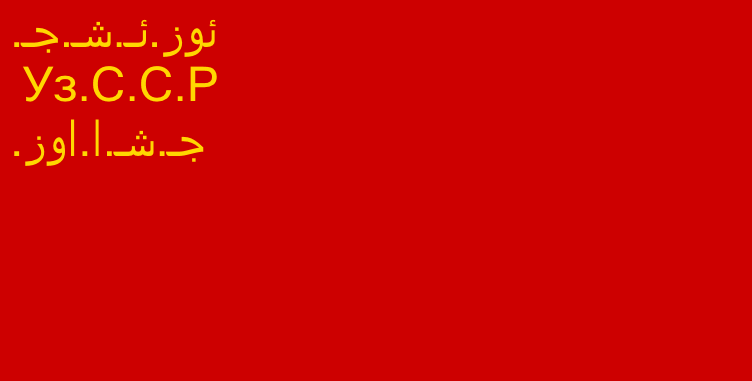
Second version of the flag (1927 – 9 May 1929)

The Russian acronym represents the Russian name "Узбекская Советская Социалистическая Республика", and the Uzbek accronymy represents the Uzbek name written in the post-1921 reformed Arabic script, "ئوزبېكیستان ئیجتیماعیی شورالەر جۇمھۇرییەتى" (O‘zbekiston ijtimoiy sho‘rolar jumhuriyati).

==== First revision ====
In 1927, the 4th session of the CEC of the Soviets of the Uzbek SSR amended Article 113 of the Constitution of the Uzbek SSR. The name of republic was depicted in Uzbek and Tajik language.

The state flag of the Uzbek Soviet Socialist Republic consists of a panel of red (scarlet) color, in the left corner of which the golden letters are placed at the top:

1. above (in Uzbek) – .ئوز.ئـ.شـ.جـ
2. middle (in Russian) – Уз.С.С.Р
3. below (in Tajik) – .جـ.شـ.ا.اوز

The ratio of flag width to length is 1:2.

— Constitution of the Uzbek SSR (1927), Article 113

The Russian acronym represents the Russian name "Узбекская Советская Социалистическая Республика", and the Uzbek accronym represents the Uzbek name written in the post-1921 reformed Arabic script, "ئوزبېكیستان ئیجتیماعیی شورالەر جۇمھۇرییەتى" (O‘zbekiston ijtimoiy sho‘rolar jumhuriyati). The Tajik accronym represents the Tajik name written in Perso-Arabic Alphabet "جمهوری شوروی اجتماعی اوزبیکستان" (Ҷумҳурии Шӯравии иҷтимоӣи Ӯзбекистон).

==== Second revision ====
Third version of the flag (9 May 1929 – 28 February 1931)

On May 9, 1929, the 3rd All-Uzbek Congress of Soviets approved the changes made by the 4th session of the CEC in 1927. The inscription of the name of the republic in Tajik and Uzbek were depicted in Latin alphabet.

The state flag of the Uzbek Soviet Socialist Republic consists of a panel of red (scarlet) color, in the left corner of which the golden letters are placed at the top:

1. above (in Uzbek) – ӨZ.Ь.Ş.Ç
2. middle (in Russian) – Уз.С.С.Р
3. below (in Tajik) – Ç.Ş.Ь.ӨZ

The ratio of flag width to length is 1:2.

— Constitution of the Uzbek SSR (1927, amended 1929), Article 113

==== Third revision ====
Fourth version of the flag (28 February 1931 – 1934)

On 5 December 1929, the Tajik ASSR was transformed into the Tajik SSR and removed from the Uzbek SSR. In accordance with this, references to the Tajik Autonomous Soviet Socialist Republic were excluded from the Constitution of the Uzbek SSR, including the inscription in the Tajik language in the description of the flag of the Uzbek SSR.

The new version of the Constitution of the Uzbek SSR was adopted on February 28, 1931, at the 4th All-Uzbek Congress of Soviets in the city of Tashkent. The new version of the flag was described in the Article 103 of the Constitution.

The state flag of the Uzbek Soviet Socialist Republic consists of a panel of red (scarlet) color, in the left corner of which the golden letters are placed at the top:

1. above (in Uzbek) – ӨZ.Ь.Ş.Ç
2. below (in Russian) – Уз.С.С.Р

The ratio of flag width to length is 1:2.

— Constitution of the Uzbek SSR (1931), Article 103

==== Fourth revision ====
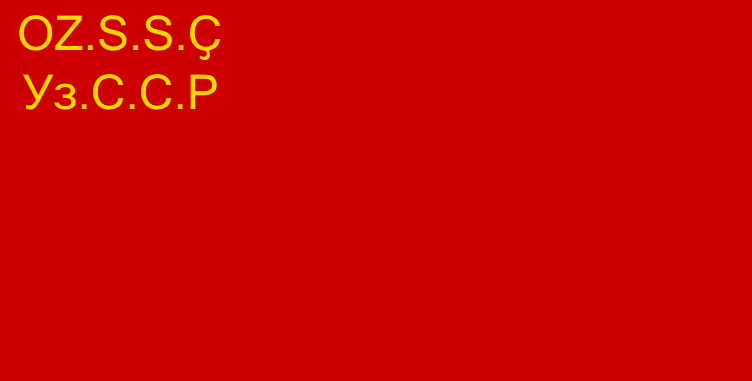
Fifth version of the flag (1934 – 1935)

From 1934, the spelling of the initial letters in the name of the republic in the Uzbek language and in the translation of the word "socialist" has changed. The change resulted in the initial name of the republic "Өzвekistan Ьҫtьmaьь Şoralar Ҫymhyrijәti (ӨZ.Ь.Ş.Ç)" to "Ozвekistan Sotsialistik Sovet Ҫumhurijәti (OZ.S.S.Ҫ)".

==== Fifth revision ====
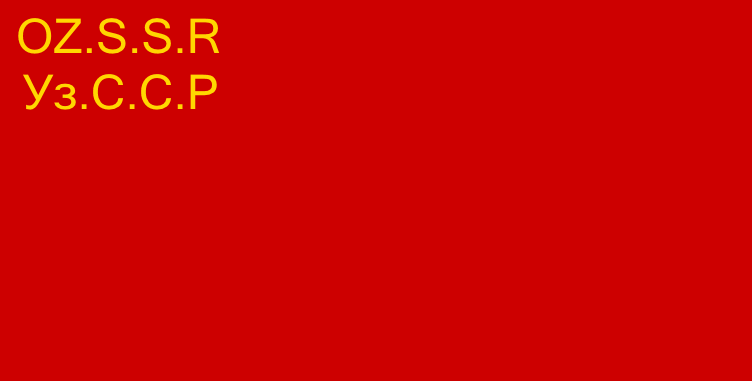
Sixth version of the flag (1935 – 14 February 1937)

From 1935, the translation of the word "republic" into the Uzbek language has changed. This change resulted in the change of the name of the republic : from "Ozвekistan Sotsialistik Sovet Ҫumhurijәti (OZ.S.S.Ҫ)" to "Ozвekistan Sotsialistik Sovet Respublikasi (OZ.S.S.R)"

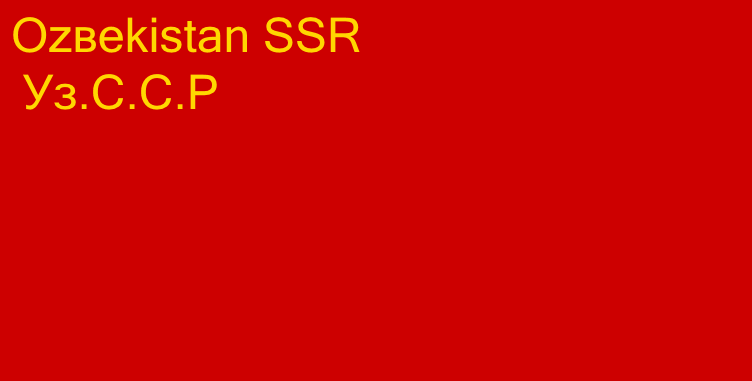
Seventh version of the flag (14 February 1937 – 23 July 1938)

=== Second version ===
On February 14, 1937, the Extraordinary 6th All-Uzbek Congress of Soviets approved the new Constitution of the Uzbek SSR. The flag was described in Article 144 of the Constitution:

The state flag of the Uzbek Soviet Socialist Republic consists of a panel of red (scarlet) color, in the left corner of which the golden letters are placed at the top:

1. above (in Uzbek) – Ozʙekistan SSR
2. below (in Russian) – Уз.С.С.Р

The ratio of flag width to length is 1:2.

— Constitution of the Uzbek SSR (1937), Article 144

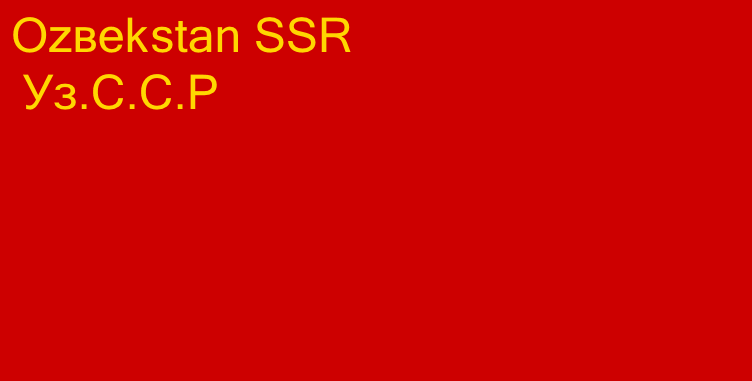
Eighth version of the flag (23 July 1938 – 16 January 1941)

==== First revision ====
On 23 July 1938, the constitution of the Uzbek SSR was amended. The name of the country in Uzbek "Ozʙekistan SSR" was changed into "Ozʙekstan SSR".

Ninth version of the flag (16 January 1941 – 29 August 1952)

==== Second revision ====
On May 8, 1940, the 3rd session of the Supreme Soviet of the Uzbek SSR adopted a law on transition to the alphabet on the basis of Cyrillic alphabet.

On January 16, 1941, by the Decree of the Presidium of the Supreme Soviet of the Uzbek SSR, the text of the inscription on the state flag of the Uzbek SSR was translated into Russian alphabet.

=== Third version ===
Tenth version of the flag (29 August 1952 – 18 November 1991)

On August 29, 1952, a new flag design, designed by the Uzbek artist Anatoly Kuzmich Osheyko was approved, by the Decree of the Presidium of the Supreme Soviet of the Uzbek SSR.

To approve the state flag of the Uzbek Soviet Socialist Republic from a red cloth with a blue stripe in the middle of the entire length of the flag. Narrow white borders go along the edges of the blue stripe. The blue stripe along with the white edging is one-fifth of the flag's width. the shaft, the golden sickle and the hammer are depicted, and above them is a red five-pointed star, framed by a gold border. The ratio of the flag's width to its length is 1:2".

— Decree "On the State Flag of the Uzbek Soviet Socialist Republic" (1952)

By the Law of the Uzbek SSR of May 30, 1953, this decree was approved. The flag description in Article 144 of the Constitution of the Uzbek SSR was amended to include the design of the new flag.

The state flag of the Uzbek Soviet Socialist Republic consists of a red cloth with a blue stripe in the middle of the entire length of the flag. Along the edges of the blue strip are narrow white rims. The blue bar with white rims is one-fifth the width of the flag. On the upper red part of the flag panel, at the flagpole, there is a golden hammer & sickle, and above them is a red five-pointed star framed by a gold border.

— Constitution of the Uzbek SSR (1937, amended 1953), Article 144

On October 31, 1955, the Decree of the Presidium of the Supreme Soviet of the Uzbek SSR "On the Procedure for Raising the State Flag of the Uzbek SSR" was adopted. By the Decree of the PVS of the Uzbek SSR of November 30, 1966, the Decree was amended.

Construction sheet based on the Regulations on the State Flag of the Uzbek SSR.

On September 27, 1974, the Decree of the Presidium of the Supreme Soviet of the Uzbek SSR approved the Regulations on the State Flag of the Uzbek SSR, which, in clarifying and supplementing the description of the flag in the Constitution, established:

The state flag of the Uzbek Soviet Socialist Republic is a red rectangular panel with a blue stripe in the middle of the entire length of the flag. Along the edges of the blue stripe are narrow white rims with a size of 1/100 of the flag's width. The blue stripe with white rim is 1/5 of the width of the flag.

On the upper red part of the flag panel, at the flagpole, there is a golden sickle and hammer and a red five-pointed star framed by a gold border. The ratio of the width of the flag to its length – 1:2.

The hammer and sickle fit into a square whose side is 1/5 of the flag's width. The sharp end of the sickle falls in the middle of the upper side of the square, the sickle and hammer handle rest on the lower corners of the square. The length of the hammer with a handle is 3/4 diagonal square. The five-pointed star fits into a circle with a diameter of 1/10 of the flag's width, touching the middle of the upper side of the square. The distance of the vertical axis of the star, sickle and hammer from the pocket for the shaft is 1/3 of the width of the flag. The distance from the top edge of the flag to the center of the star is 1/10 of the width of the flag.

— Regulations on the State Flag of the Uzbek SSR (1974)

By the Decree of the Council of Ministers of the Uzbek SSR of October 14, 1974, the instruction on the application of the Regulations on the State Flag of the Uzbek SSR was introduced.

The amendment to the decree "On the State Flag of the Uzbek SSR" was approved by the Decree of the Presidium of the Supreme Soviet of the Uzbek SSR dated June/July 30, 1981. According to the amended decree, the reverse side of the flag was still the same, but without any hammer and sickle.

==== Symbolism ====
There was no official explanation of the symbolism of the flag. In various publications, white stripes represents the cotton-growing fields, and the blue bar represents the Amudarya river and irrigation in Uzbekistan. Another source describes the blue bar as the symbol of Pan-Turkism, as seen in the flag of the Turkic Council, although Uzbekistan was against Pan-Turkism in the USSR.

=== Fourth version ===
Eleventh version of the flag, later becoming the flag of the independent Republic of Uzbekistan (18 November 1991 – present)

A search for a national flag began soon after, with a contest being held to determine the new design. More than 200 submissions were made, and a commission was formed in order to evaluate these suggestions coming from a variety of stakeholders. The winning design was adopted on 18 November 1991, after being selected at an extraordinary session of the Uzbek Supreme Soviet. In doing so, Uzbekistan became the first of the newly independent republics in Central Asia to choose a new flag. Pertaining to its tricolour combination of horizontal stripes of blue, white and green colour, it is similar to the flags of Lesotho, an enclaved country within the border of South Africa, and Puntland, a Somali federal state at the tip of the Horn.

== See also ==
- Flag of the Soviet Union
- Coat of arms of the Uzbek SSR
- Flag of Uzbekistan
