= Qallibek Kamolov =

Uzbek politician (1926–2026)

- Qállibek Kamalov

First Secretary of the Karakalpak Regional Committee of the Communist Party of Uzbekistan
- In office March 1963 – 13 August 1984
- Preceded by: Nosir Mahmudov
- Succeeded by: Kakimbek Saliqov

Chairman of the Council of Ministers of the Karakalpak ASSR
- In office 31 March 1959 – 16 March 1963
- Preceded by: Navro‘z Japakov
- Succeeded by: Yerejep Aytmuratov

Personal details
- Born: Qallibek Kamolovich Kamolov; 18 March 1926 Taxtakópir District, Karakalpak AO, Kazakh ASSR, Russian SFSR, Soviet Union
- Died: 11 February 2026 (aged 99) Nukus, Karakalpakstan, Uzbekistan
- Party: CPSU
- Education: Karakalpak State Pedagogical Institute
- Occupation: Teacher

Qallibek Kamolovich Kamolov (Karakalpak: Қәллибек Камалов, romanized: Qállibek Kamalov; 18 March 1926 – 11 February 2026) or sometimes written Kallibek Kamalov was an Uzbek politician. A member of the Communist Party of the Soviet Union, he served as Chairman of the Council of Ministers of the Karakalpak ASSR from 1959 to 1963 and was the longest-serving First Secretary of the Karakalpak Regional Committee of the Communist Party of Uzbekistan, having held the position from 1963 to 1984. His brother, Temur Kamalov and his son Murat Kamalov also held the position of Chairman of the Supreme Council of the Republic of Karakalpakstan from 1997 to 2002 and from 2020 to 2022.

Kamolov died in Nukus on 11 February 2026, at the age of 99.

== Awards and honours ==
- Hero of Socialist Labour (1973)
- Three Orders of Lenin (27 August 1971; 10 December 1973; 25 December 1976)
- Order of the October Revolution (4 March 1980)
- Order of the Red Banner of Labour (1 March 1965)
- Two Orders of the Badge of Honour (17 December 1949; 11 January 1957)
- Two Medals "For Labour Valour" (28 October 1949; 25 December 1959)

Stripped of all titles on 15 June 1990 by the President of the USSR regarding the Uzbek cotton scandal.
