= Emblem of Karakalpakstan =

State Emblem of the Republic of Karakalpakstan
- Armiger: Karakalpakstan
- Adopted: April 9, 1993
- Supporter: Kumai bird
- Motto: ҚАРАҚАЛПАҚСТАН

The Emblem of Karakalpakstan (Karakalpak: Қарақалпақстан Республикасының мәмлекетлик герби, romanized: Qaraqalpaqstan Respublikasınıń mámleketlik gerbi) is one of the official symbols (along with the flag and anthem) of Karakalpakstan, an autonomous republic within Uzbekistan. It was approved on April 9, 1993. The coat of arms was developed from a sketch by Karakalpak artist Jollybai Izentaev based on the emblem of Uzbekistan.

== Design ==
The emblem of Karakalpakstan is very similar to the emblem of Uzbekistan, and practically copies it in parts. It is a sign of the unity of the two republics. The emblem of Karakalpakstan shows the rising sun above the dark blue mountains and the ancient Zoroastrian fortress of Chilpyk - a symbol of ancient history and culture of the republic, the Amu Darya and the Aral Sea, surrounded by a wreath of wheat ears on the right and cotton branches with open boxes of cotton on the left. At the top of the coat of arms is an octahedron of blue with orange edges, inside which is a crescent with a white star. In the center of the coat of arms is a depiction of the mythical Kumai bird with open wings. The inscription "QARAQALPAQSTAN" (or "ҚАРАҚАЛПАҚСТАН") is written at the bottom of the ribbon bow of the wreath, which symbolizes the national flag of the republic. The wreath made of branches of cotton and wheat is tied with ribbons of flowers from the flags of Uzbekistan and Karakalpakstan.

== History ==
=== First version ===
The first Constitution of the Karakalpak ASSR was adopted on December 21, 1934, by the 2nd Congress of Soviets of the Autonomous Soviet Socialist Republic.

The emblem of the republic consisted of images on a red background of a golden sickle and hammer, placed crisscrossed with handles downwards and surrounded by a wreath of wheat ears, at the bottom on the sling was the image of the Karakul rune.

=== Second version ===
On March 23, 1937, the new Constitution of the Karakalpak Autonomous Soviet Socialist Republic was approved. The constitution described the arms in Article 110:

State Emblem of the Karakalpak Autonomous Soviet Socialist Republic
- Armiger: Karakalpak Autonomous Soviet Socialist Republic
- Adopted: March 23, 1937; May 29, 1978 (final revision)
- Crest: Red five-pointed star with golden border
- Motto: Бутун дунё пролетарлари, бирлашингиз! (Uzbek) Барлық еллердиң пролетарлары, бирлесиңиз! (Karakalpak) "Workers of the world, unite!"
- Earlier version: 1934

The state emblem of the Kara-Kalpak Autonomous Soviet Socialist Republic is the state emblem of the Uzbek SSR, which consists of a picture on a white background in the golden rays of the rising sun of silver uraca (hammer) and a hammer, placed cross on the cross, and surrounded by a wreath consisting of wheat on the right and left of cotton branches with flowers and open cotton boxes, a part of the globe lies between the halves of the wreath. a red ribbon with inscriptions on it, on the right in Karakalpak language "Proletarians of all countries, unite!" and on the left in Uzbek language "Proletarians of all countries, unite!", at the bottom of the tape there are golden initials with the inscription "Uzbek SSR", with letters a smaller size of the Kara-Kalpak ASSR in Karakalpak and Russian languages. Above the ribbon is a red five-pointed star with a gold border.

— Constitution of the Karakalpak ASSR (1937), Article 110

Inscriptions on the arms: the abbreviation of the name of the republic in Uzbek "OZSSR", in Karakalpak "QQASSR" and in Russian "ККАССР"; the motto: in Karakalpak region "PYTKIL DYNJA PROLETARLARI BIRLESINIZ"; in Uzbek "BUTUN DUNJA PROLETARLARI BIRLASINIZ".

=== First revision ===
In the late 1930s, the process of translating the written languages of the USSR into a Cyrillic basis began, in 1940 an alphabet and spelling rules for the Karakalpak language were developed. The new alphabet was introduced by decree of the Presidium of the Supreme Council of the CCASSR on July 18, 1940, which established a deadline before January 1, 1942 for the transition of the press, education and institutions to a new alphabet.

Inscriptions on the coat of arms: the abbreviation of the name of the republic in Uzbek "ЎзССР", in Karakalpak "ҚҚАССР" and in Russian "ККАССР"; the motto: in Karakalpak language БАРЛЫК, ЕЛЛЕРДИН ПРОЛЕТАРЛАРЫ, БИРЛЕСИНИЗ!"; in Uzbek "БУТУН ДУНЁ ПРОЛЕТАРЛАРИ, БИРЛАШИНГИЗ!".

=== Second revision ===
In 1956, the abbreviation mark between the letters on the coat of arms was deleted.

=== Third revision ===
After the adoption of the new Constitution of the USSR in 1977 and the new Constitution of the Uzbek SSR, the Extraordinary 8th Session of the Supreme Soviet of the 9th convocation of the Karakalpak ASSR on May 29, 1978 adopted a new Constitution of the CCASSR. Article 156.

"The State Emblem of the Karakalpak Autonomous Soviet Socialist Republic is the State Emblem of the Uzbek SSR, which is an image of the sickle and hammer in the sun, surrounded by a wreath on the right of the wheat ears and to the left - cotton branches with flowers and open cotton boxes, a five-pointed star, and below it a part of the globe is depicted: on the ribbon there is a wreath of inscriptions: on the right - in the Karakalpak language "БАРЛЫҚ ЕЛЛЕРДИҢ ПРОЛЕТАРЛАРЫ, БИРЛЕСИҢИЗ!", on the left - in Uzbek "БУТУН ДУНЁ ПРОЛЕТАРЛАРИ, БИРЛАШИНГИЗ!" Below on the ribbon of the ribbon there is an inscription "ЎзССР" and letters of a smaller size "ҚҚАССР".

Changes in the emblem of 1978: the abbreviation of the name of the republic in Russian was deleted; the distribution of the words of the motto on the ribbon turns has changed - if earlier on each tape there were two words arranged in two rows, now there are four words on the upper turn of the tape (in two rows), and on the bottom - only one.
