= Tiyin =

Subdivision of the Uzbekistani sum

- Uzbekistan
- Value: 0.01 soʻm
- Mass: 1.75 g
- Diameter: 16.9 mm
- Thickness: 1.2 mm
- Edge: Smooth
- Composition: Brass-plated steel
- Years of minting: 1994

Obverse

Reverse

Tiyin is a unit of currency of Uzbekistan, equal to 1/100 of a soʻm. The tiyin was also the name of a subunit of the Kazakhstani tenge until 1995.

The Uzbek tiyin is the world's lowest value coin that was still legal tender until 1 March 2020, although in practice it was rarely found in circulation. As of 2024, it takes 1,000 of them to equal just one penny in the United States.
