= Emblem of the Uzbek Soviet Socialist Republic =

- Armiger: Uzbek Soviet Socialist Republic
- Adopted: 2 March 1937
- Relinquished: 2 July 1992
- Crest: Red star
- Shield: Globe, rising sun, and hammer and sickle
- Supporters: Cotton and Wheat
- Motto: Бутун дунё пролетарлари, бирлашингиз! (Uzbek) Пролетарии всех стран, соединяйтесь! (Russian) "Workers of the world, unite!"
- Earlier version

The Emblem of the Uzbek Soviet Socialist Republic was adopted on 14 February 1937 by the government of the Uzbek Soviet Socialist Republic. The emblem is based on the emblem of the Soviet Union. It shows symbols of agriculture (sickle, cotton and wheat) and heavy industry (hammer). The rising sun over a map of the Soviet Central Asia symbolizes the future of this region, while the five pointed red star stands for the "socialist revolution on all five continents".

The banner bears the Soviet Union state motto ("Workers of the world, unite!") in both the Russian and Uzbek languages. In Uzbek, it is "Бутун дунё пролетарлари, бирлашингиз!" (in the current Uzbek Latin script: "Butun dunyo proletarlari, birlashingiz!"). The acronym of the Uzbek SSR is shown only in the Uzbek alphabet. The earlier version of the emblem, from 1947 until the late 1970s, had a silver hammer and sickle before the emblem was redone with a gold hammer and sickle. The emblem was discontinued in 1991 and a changed format adopted in 1992 as the present Emblem of Uzbekistan, which retains many parts of the old Soviet one, including cotton, wheat and the rising sun. There are major changes in the new emblem, including the red star replaced with Uzbek Rub el Hizb, globe and the hammer and sickle replaced with Huma bird, Amu and Sir rivers and mountains, and the red banner replaced with the current national flag.

The Karakalpak Autonomous Soviet Socialist Republic used a variant of this emblem, with the state motto in both Karakalpak and Uzbek languages, and the republic's acronym.

== History ==
=== First version ===
On 22 July 1925, the Central Executive Committee (CEC) of the Soviets of the Uzbek SSR adopted Resolution No. 67 "On the arms and flag of the Uzbek Soviet Socialist Republic" which "temporarily, pending the adoption of the Constitution of the Uzbek SSR" a coat of arms was adopted. The design of the coat of arms, taken as a basis, represented images on a white background in the golden rays of the sun of silver uraca (a sickle) and a hammer crisscrossed downwards, surrounded by a wreath of ears and a branch of cotton; On the scarlet ribbon wrapping a wreath, there was an inscription "УзССР" (in Uzbek language in Arabic alphabet and in Russian), in the upper part of the emblem there was a red star with a gold border; the coat of arms was surrounded by an inscription from above in Uzbek, from below in Russian: "Workers of all countries, unite!".

==== First revision ====
On 8 October 1925, the Central Executive Committee of the Uzbek SSR adopted a resolution "On drafting the Constitution of the UzSSR and on the composition of the commission for the development of this project." On 30 March 1927, the draft Constitution was approved by the II All-Uzbek Congress of Soviets. It was accepted the proposal of the representative of the Tajik Autonomous Soviet Socialist Republic to make inscriptions in the emblem of the Uzbek SSR in three languages (add Tajik). A description of the coat of arms is given in Article 112:

The State Emblem of the Uzbek Soviet Socialist Republic consists of a picture on a white background in the golden rays of the sun of silver uraca (a local sickle) and a hammer placed criss-crossed by handles down and surrounded by a wreath - on the right of wheat ears and to the left - from a branch of cotton with flowers and open bolls such.

The crown will translate ribbons of red (scarlet) color with the inscription of the name of the republic on them:
a) below on the fastening of the crown (in Uzbek) Arabic graphics
b) on the left (on the branch of cotton - in Russian)
c) on the right (on the ears of wheat - in Tajik), Arabic graphics
At the top between the ends of wheat ears and a branch of cotton is a red (scarlet) five-pointed star with a gold border. The whole emblem is surrounded by the motto "Workers of all countries, unite!":
a) on the right (in Uzbek), Arab graphics
b) on the left (in Tajik), Arab graphics

c) at the bottom (in Russian)

— Constitution of the Uzbek SSR (1927), Article 112

==== Second revision ====
In the years 1927-1928. the Uzbek script was translated into the Latinized alphabet. On 2 February 1929, the Central Executive Committee of the republic adopted a resolution to change the State Emblem of the Uzbek SSR in connection with the romanization of the alphabet, and on 9 May 1929, the All-Uzbek Congress of Soviets approved this resolution by making changes to the Constitution. The abbreviation of the name of the republic was given by a new alphabet at the bottom of the wreath in Uzbek, on the right in Tajik, on the left in Russian. The motto "Workers of all countries, unite!" Around the coat of arms - on the right in Uzbek, on the left in Tajik. With the formation of the Tajik SSR on 16 October 1929, inscriptions in the Tajik language were removed from the State Emblem of the Uzbek SSR. Most likely, these changes were also carried out by the decisions of the Central Executive Committee of the Uzbek SSR.

=== Second version ===
IV All-Uzbek Congress of Soviets in February 1931 adopted a resolution "On Amending the Constitution of the UzSSR in connection with the allocation of the Tajik ASSR from the UzSSR and the liquidation of the districts." A new description of the coat of arms is given in Article 102:

The State Emblem of the Uzbek Soviet Socialist Republic consists of a picture on a white background in the golden rays of the rising sun, silver uraca (local sickle) and a hammer, placed crosswise in crosshairs and surrounded by a wreath consisting of wheat ears on the right and left of a cotton branch with flowers and open boxes of that; below, between the two halves of the wreath is a part of the globe. Both halves of the wreath are interwoven with a ribbon of red (scarlet) color, on which are inscriptions on the right in Uzbek and on the left in Russian - "Proletarians of all countries, unite!", At the bottom on the ribbon ribbons golden initials of "UzSSR" in Uzbek, above the ribbon at the top of the coat of arms red five-pointed star with a gold border."

— Constitution of the Uzbek SSR (1931), Article 102

The abbreviation of the name of the republic: "ӨZ.Ь.Ş.Ҫ." - Өzʙekistan Ьҫtьmaьь Şoralar Ҫymhyrijәti; the motto: "ВYTYN DUNJA PROLETARLARЬ, ВIRLƏŞIꞐIZ!".

==== First revision ====
In the years 1934-1935. there is a reform of the Uzbek Latin: since 1934 vowels Өө, Yy, and Ьь have been canceled. As a result, the inscription of the motto changed to: "BUTUN DUNJA PROLETARLARI, ВIRLAŞIꞐIZ!", The name of the republic was written as "Ozʙekistan". At the same time, the translation of the words in the republic's name "socialist" (Ьҫtьmaьь-Sotsialistik) and "Soviet" (Şoralar-Sovet) is clarified, and in 1935 the translation of the word "republic" (Ҫymhyrijәti - Respuʙlikasi) has changed. Perhaps, these changes could be introduced by the relevant decisions of the Central Executive Committee of the republic, there could be variants of the emblem of 1931 with abbreviations for the name of the republic "Oz.S.S.Ҫ." and "Oz.S.S.R.". Most likely, one of these options corresponds to a color image of the coat of arms in the interiors of the Northern River Station (Moscow), the construction of which was completed in 1937.

==== Second revision ====
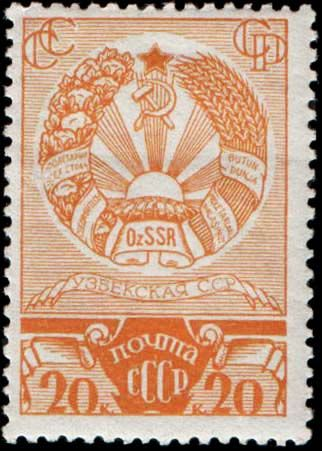
Arms of the Uzbek SSR on a 1937 stamp

According to the Constitution, approved by the VI Extraordinary All-Uzbek Congress of Soviets on 14 February 1937, the initials of the republic and the motto were written differently in the state emblem in connection with the clarification of the translation of inscriptions: "OzSSR" - Ozʙekistan Sotsialistik Sovet Respuʙlikasi; the motto: "BUTUN DUNJA PROLETARLARI, ВIRLAŞIꞐIZ!".

The description of the coat of arms is given in 143 articles of the Constitution, But, judging by these two images, the design of the emblem of this period has undergone some changes: to the location and frequency of the sun's rays; and the coat of arms clearly shows a sickle, although the description mentions uraca. In the drawings of the coat of arms in a later period portrayed uraca.

==== Third revision ====
11 July 1939 by the Decree of the Presidium of the Supreme Soviet of the USSR, the alphabets of a number of Union and autonomous republics were translated into Russian. Under the Law of 8 May 1940, the Uzbek script was translated from the Latin alphabet into a new Uzbek based on Russian graphics.

The 4th session of the Supreme Council of Uzbekistan on 16 January 1941, considered the question of changing the name of the republic on the arms and adopted a decree according to which the text of the inscriptions was translated into a new alphabet, and the name began to look like "Ӯз.С.С.Р." In the edition of the Constitution of the Uzbek SSR of the 1940s, the coat of arms is described in Article 143:

The State Coat of Arms of the Uzbek Soviet Socialist Republic consists of a picture on a white background in the golden rays of the rising sun of silver uraca (hammer) and a hammer, placed criss-crossed by handles downwards and surrounded by a wreath, ears of wheat and left - from cotton branches with flowers and open cotton boxes; down between the halves of the wreath is a part of the globe. Both halves are intertwined with a red ribbon bearing inscriptions: on the right in the Uzbek language "БУТУН ДУНЁ ПРОЛЕТАРЛАРИ, БИРЛАШИНГИЗ!" And on the left in Russian "Proletarians of all countries, unite!"; on the ribbon there are ribbons of gold initials with the inscription "Ӯз.С.С.Р."; above the ribbon at the top of the coat of arms - a red five-pointed star with a gold border.

— Constitution of the Uzbek SSR (1941), Article 143

According to the spelling rules of 1956, the abbreviation of the republic's name was written without dots.

==== Fourth revision ====
In the new Constitution (adopted 19 April 1978 at the extraordinary 6th session of the Supreme Soviet of the Uzbek SSR of the ninth convocation), the description of the arms is as follows:

Article 178. The State Emblem of the Uzbek Soviet Socialist Republic is an image of the sickle and hammer surrounded by the sun a wreath consisting on the right of wheat ears and to the left - from cotton branches with flowers and open cotton boxes; in the upper part of the arms there is a five-pointed star; below is a part of the globe. On the ribbon there is a wreath of inscriptions: on the left - in Uzbek language "БУТУН ДУНЁ ПРОЛЕТАРЛАРИ, БИРЛАШИНГИЗ!", On the right - in Russian "Proletarians of all countries, unite!". Below on the ribbon is the inscription "Ўз.ССР".

In the image of the coat of arms, the shape of the rays changed, the size (diameter) of the globe decreased with respect to the size of the whole emblem, the mottos on the sides of the wreath changed places, now the motto is in Russian on the right side and in Uzbek on the left. But the most noticeable changes were the changes in the color of the sickle and uraq (although in the description it is called a sickle) from silver to gold (in the description, color is not specified) - the generally accepted color in Soviet emblematic.

The Regulation on the Emblem of the Uzbek SSR was approved by the Decree of the Supreme Council of the Republic of Uzbekistan on 30 July 1981 and the Law of 27 November 1981.

== Gallery ==
Emblem of the Uzbek Soviet Socialist Republic (1921)

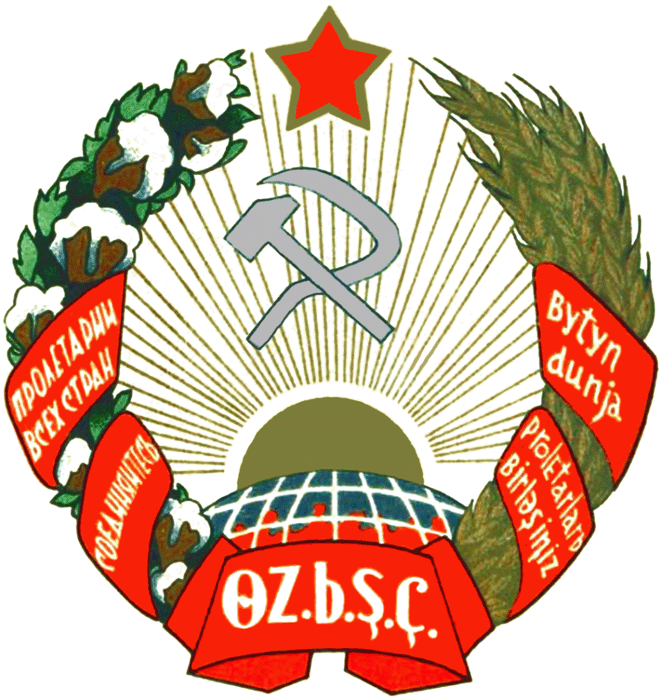
Emblem of Uzbek Soviet Socialist Republic (1929–1941)

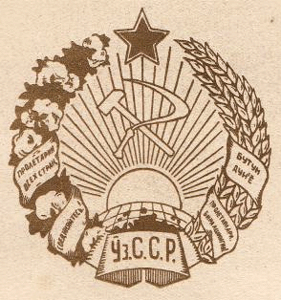
Emblem of Uzbek Soviet Socialist Republic (1941–1956)

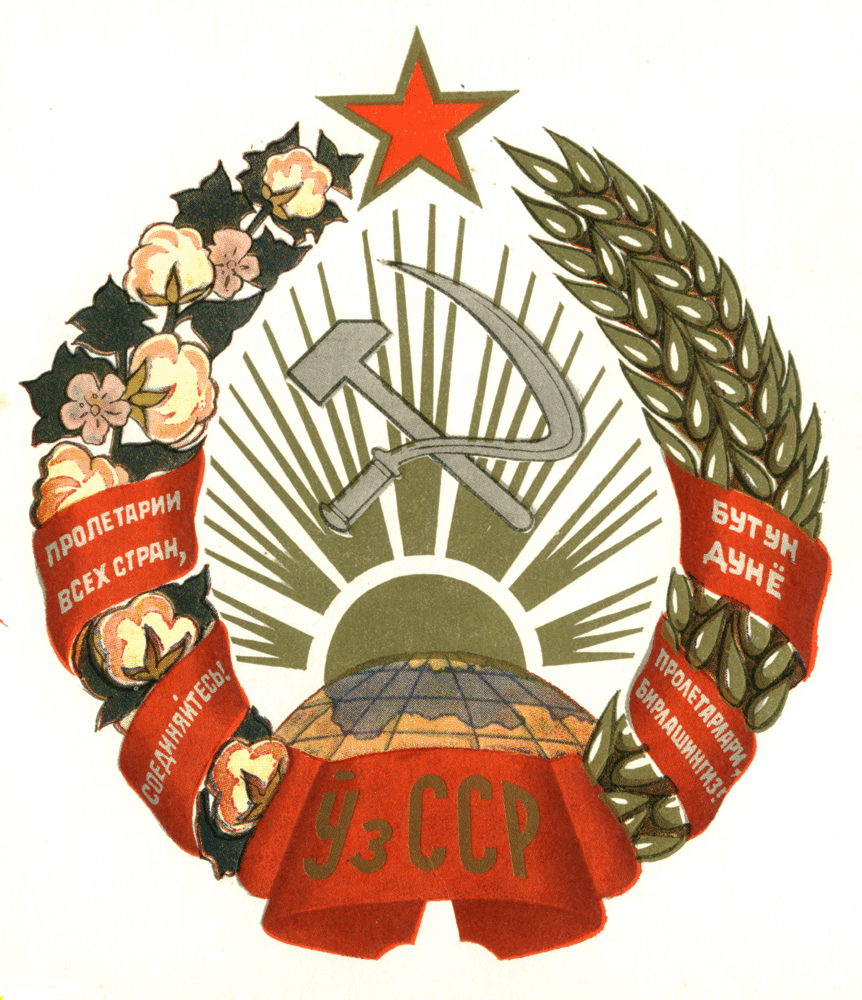
Emblem of the Uzbek Soviet Socialist Republic (1956–1978)

Emblem of Uzbek Soviet Socialist Republic (1978–1991) and the Republic of Uzbekistan (1991–1992)
