= Karakalpak Regional Committee of the Communist Party of Uzbekistan =

Emblem of the region

The First Secretary of the Karakalpak regional branch of the Communist Party of Uzbekistan was the position of highest authority in the Karakalpak AO (1925–1932) in the Kazak ASSR (from July 20, 1930, in the Russian SFSR) and the Karakalpak ASSR (1932–1991) in the Uzbek SSR (until December 5, 1936, in the Russian SFSR) of the Soviet Union. The position was created in October 1924, and abolished on September 14, 1991. The First Secretary was a de facto appointed position usually by the Central Committee the Communist Party of Uzbekistan or the First Secretary of the Republic.

== List of First Secretaries of the Karakalpak Communist Party ==
| Name | Term of Office | | Life years |
| Name | Start | End | Life years |
First Secretaries of the Communist Party
| Allayar Dosnazarov | October 1924 | April 1925 | 1896–1937 |
| Abu Kudabayev | April 1925 | 1927 | |
| Pyotr Varlamov | 1927 | 1930 | 1899–1942 |
| Timofey Churbanov | May 1930 | April 1933 | 1895–? |
| Islam Aliev | April 1933 | April 1937 | 1897–1938 |
| Davlet Rizayev | 1937 | August 1937 | |
| Kerim Baltayev | 1937 | 1939 | |
| Kurbanbay Khalikeyev | 1939 | April 1941 | |
| Sabyr Kamalov | April 1941 | October 1946 | 1910–1990 |
| Pirzhan Seitov | October 1946 | 1949 | 1909–? |
| Tursun Kambarov | 1949 | 1950 | 1912–? |
| Pirzhan Seitov | 1950 | January 1952 | 1909–? |
| Arzi Mokhmudov | January 1952 | 1956 | 1910–1970 |
| Nazir Mokhmudov | 1956 | March 1963 | 1913–1987 |
| Qallibek Kamolov | March 1963 | August 13, 1984 | 1926–2026 |
| Kakimbek Salykov | August 13, 1984 | July 26, 1989 | 1932– |
| Sagyndyk Niyetullayev | July 26, 1989 | January 18, 1991 | 1948– |
| Dauletbay Shamshetov | January 18, 1991 | September 14, 1991 | 1948– |

== See also ==
- Karakalpak Autonomous Oblast
- Karakalpak Autonomous Soviet Socialist Republic

== Sources ==
- World Statesmen.org
