= Flag of Uzbekistan =

Republic of Uzbekistan
- Flag of Uzbekistan
- Oʻzbekiston Respublikasining davlat bayrogʻi (Uzbek)
- Use: Civil and state flag, civil and state ensign
- Proportion: 1∶2
- Adopted: 18 November 1991; 35 years ago
- Design: A horizontal triband of dark blue, white, and green, separated by two narrow red stripes. A white crescent and twelve white five-pointed stars in three rows are situated on the hoist side of the upper azure stripe.
- Designed by: Farhod Yoʻldoshev

The national flag of Uzbekistan, officially the state flag of the Republic of Uzbekistan, (Note: Uzbek: Oʻzbekiston Respublikasining davlat bayrogʻi/Ўзбекистон Республикасининг давлат байроғи) consists of a horizontal triband of dark azure blue, white and dark green, separated by two thin red fimbriations, with a white crescent moon and twelve white stars in the canton. Adopted in 1991 to replace the flag of the Uzbek Soviet Socialist Republic, it has been the flag of the Republic of Uzbekistan since the country gained independence in that same year. The design of the present flag was based on the former one.

== Design ==
=== Construction ===
According to Article 4 of Law No. 407-XII, On the State Flag of the Republic of Uzbekistan, the flag consists of three equal horizontal stripes of dark azure blue, white, and dark green separated by narrow red stripes (fimbriations), with the blue stripe bearing a white crescent and twelve white five-pointed stars near the flagpole (hoist). The width-to-length ratio of the flag is 1:2, and the dimensions of a standard-sized flag are 125 by 250 centimetres. The blue, white, and green stripes of a standard-sized flag are each 40 centimetres wide, while the red stripe is 2.5 centimetres wide. The crescent and stars are positioned inside an imaginary rectangle measuring 30 by 75 centimetres and located 20 centimetres from the flagpole. The crescent faces away from the flagpole and fits inside an imaginary circle with a diameter of 30 centimetres, while the stars each fit inside an imaginary circle with a diameter of 6 centimetres. The stars are arranged in three horizontal rows, with the top row having three stars, the middle having four, and the bottom having five. The stars are 6 centimetres apart from each other, and the nearest star to the crescent, on the bottom row, is 3.5 centimetres from the lower tip of the crescent.

Construction sheet of the flag of Uzbekistan

=== Symbolism ===
Despite the lack of officially designated symbolism for the elements of the flag, various interpretations exist, ranging from geopolitical and historical to cultural and spiritual.

The azure colour on the flag is a symbol of the sky and of clear water. Azure is also the colour of the Turkic peoples. White is the traditional Uzbek symbol of peace and good luck. Green is a symbol of nature, new life, and good harvest. The red fimbriations represent the power of life.

The image of the crescent moon is connected with Uzbek historical imagery as well as being a symbol of the birth of a new nation. The stars represent the provinces of the Country, as well as an allusion to Uzbek historical tradition and calendar. The stars are also a symbol of the pursuit of perfection and happiness of Uzbek people in their homeland.

The government of Uzbekistan does not specify which hues should be used on its flag and instead generalizes them as azure, white, green, and red.

=== Legal protection ===
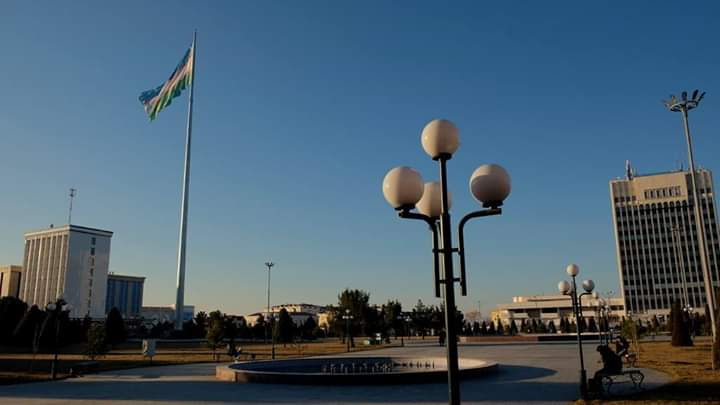
The Uzbek flag flying in Kuksaray Square, Samarkand

On 27 December 2010, President Islam Karimov signed an amendment to the law that strengthened the protection of the country's symbols, including its flag and emblem. It banned the utilization of the flag of Uzbekistan for promotional and commercial purposes, including its usage in advertisements and documents. It also forbade any organizations that are not affiliated with the Uzbek government from adopting logos that resemble the national symbols.

== History ==
Under Soviet rule, the Union Republic – situated in what is now modern-day Uzbekistan – utilised a flag derived from the flag of the Soviet Union and representing Communism, that was approved in 1952. The flag is similar to the Soviet design but with the blue stripe in 1/5 width and the two 1/100 white edges in between.

Uzbekistan declared itself independent on 1 September 1991, approximately three months before the dissolution of the Soviet Union. A search for a national flag began soon after, with a contest being held to determine the new design. More than 200 submissions were made, and a commission was formed in order to evaluate these suggestions coming from a variety of stakeholders. The winning design was adopted on 18 November 1991, after being selected at an extraordinary session of the Uzbek Supreme Soviet. In doing so, Uzbekistan became the first of the newly independent republics in Central Asia to choose a new flag.

== Other flags ==
Flag of Karakalpakstan

Presidential standard of Uzbekistan

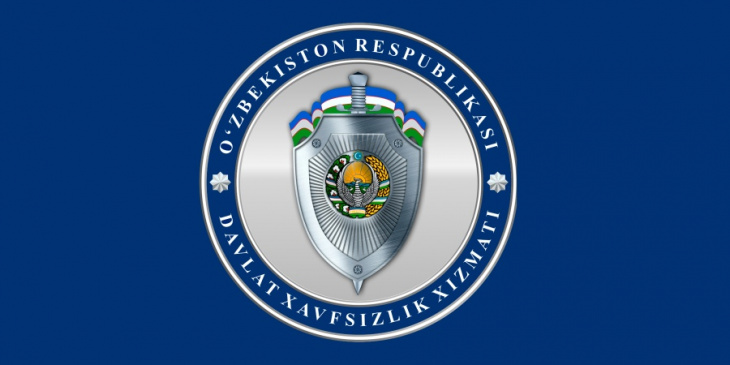
Flag of the State Security Service of Uzbekistan

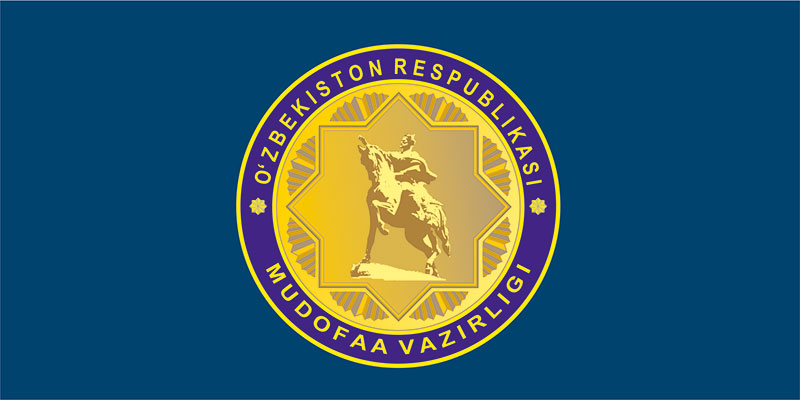
Flag of the Ministry of Defence of Uzbekistan

Flag of the Uzbekistan Air and Air Defence Forces

Flag of the Uzbekistan Naval Forces

== See also ==
- List of Uzbek flags
- Coat of arms of Uzbekistan
- State Anthem of Uzbekistan
