= Council of Ministers of Karakalpakstan =

Uzbek government institution

- Emblem of Karakalpakstan

Government overview
- Formed: 30 September 1991
- Preceding Government: Council of Ministers of the Karakalpak Autonomous Soviet Socialist Republic
- Jurisdiction: Republic of Karakalpakstan, Uzbekistan
- Headquarters: 50 Garezsizlik Street, Karakalpakstan, Nukus, Uzbekistan
- Minister responsible: Kakhraman Sariyev, Chairman of the Council of Ministers
- Website: Official Website

The Council of Ministers of Karakalpakstan (Karakalpak: Қарақалпақстан Республикасы Министрлер Кеңеси, romanized: Qaraqalpaqstan Respublikası Ministrler Keńesi; Uzbek: Qoraqalpogʻiston Respublikasi Vazirlar Mahkamasi) is the executive body of the Government of the Republic of Karakalpakstan.

== Institutions of the Council of Ministers ==
=== Overview ===
Ministries	Committees	Departments	Agencies
Ministry of Investments and Foreign Trade	Forestry Committee	Main Department for Tourism and Sports	Karakalpakkino
Ministry of Economic Development and Poverty Reduction	Antimonopoly Committee	Department of Emergency Situations	
Ministry for Support of the Mahalla and the Senior Generation	Committee of Veterinary Medicine and Livestock Development	Department of Information and Mass Communications	Karakalpak News Agency
Ministry of Finance	Committee on Ecology and Environmental Protection	Department of the State Customs Committee	Department of Information and Mass Communications
Ministry of Public Education		Department of Statistics	
Ministry of Preschool Education		State Tax Administration	
Ministry of Internal Affairs			
Ministry of Employment and Labor Relations			
Ministry of Health			
Ministry of Justice			
Ministry of Agriculture			
Ministry of Culture			
Ministry of Construction			
Ministry of Housing and Communal Services			
Ministry of Water Resources			
Ministry of Transport			

== List of Chairmen ==
List of Chairmen
Name	Start date	End date	Notes
Kasym Avezov	April 1925	March 1929	
Kasym Avezov	30 May 1932	1935	
Dzhumabay Kurbanov	1935	1938	
Khodjabay Nietullaev	July 1938	1941	
Pirzhan Seitov	1941	October 1946	
Nauruz Zhapakov	October 1946	1952	
Jolimbet Seitniyazov	1952	1954	
Pirzhan Seitov	July 15, 1954	1956	
Nauruz Zhapakov	1956	March 31, 1959	
Qallibek Kamolov	March 31, 1959	March 16, 1963	
Yerezhep Aitmuratov	March 1963	July 15, 1981	
Marat Yusupov	15 July 1981	August 1985	
Damir Yadgarov	August 1985	October 1988	
Sagyndyk Nietullaev	October 1988	July 1989	
Amin Tojiyev	July 1989	January 1992	
Rejepbay Yuldashev	1992	1995	
Bahram Jumaniyazov	February 1995	December 1995	
Saparbay Avezmatov	December 1995	1998	
Amin Tojiyev	October 1998	10 July 2002	
Tursynbai Tanirbergenov	2002	2006	
Bahadir Yangibaevich	September 23, 2006	October 13, 2016	
Kakhraman Sariev	October 14, 2016	17 December 2022	
Farkhat Ermanov	17 December 2022	present	
