= 1978 Constitution of the Uzbek Soviet Socialist Republic =

The constitution of the Uzbek Soviet Socialist Republic was a communist state constitution adopted on 18 April 1978 at the extraordinary session of the Supreme Soviet of Uzbekistan. The Constitution of Uzbekistan of 1978 contains 11 parts and it is further divided into 21 chapters.
