= State Anthem of the Republic of Karakalpakstan =

Қарақалпақстан Республикасының мәмлекетлик гимни
English: State Anthem of the Republic of Karakalpakstan
- Qaraqalpaqstan Respublikasınıń mámleketlik gimni
- Coat of arms of the Republic of Karakalpakstan
- State anthem of Karakalpakstan, Uzbekistan
- Lyrics: Ibrayım Yusupov
- Music: Nájimaddin Muhammeddinov
- Adopted: 24 December 1993

Audio sample
- Official orchestral and choral vocal recording: file; help

The State Anthem of the Republic of Karakalpakstan (Note: Karakalpak: Қарақалпақстан Республикасының мәмлекетлик гимни, romanized: Qaraqalpaqstan Respublikasınıń mámleketlik gimni; Uzbek: Қорақалпоғистон Республикаси Давлат мадҳияси, romanized: Qoraqalpog‘iston Respublikasi Davlat madhiyasi) was composed by Najimaddin Muhammeddinov, with lyrics written by Karakalpak poet and playwright Ibrayım Yusupov. It was officially adopted on 24 December 1993.

== Lyrics ==
=== Karakalpak original ===
Latin script

Jayxun jaǵasında ósken bayterek,
Túbi bir, shaqası mıń bolar demek.
Sen sonday sayalı, quyashlı elseń,
Tınıshlıq hám ıǵbal sendegi tilek.

Naqıratı:
Diyxan baba nápesi bar jerinde,
Juwsan ańqıp, kiyik qashar shólinde.
𝄆 Qaraqalpaqstan 𝄇 degen atıńdı,
Áwladlar ádiwler júrek tórinde.

Aydın keleshekke shaqırar zaman,
Mártlik miynet, bilim jetkizer oɡ́an.
Xalqıń bar azamat, dos hám miyirban,
Erkin jaynap–jasnap, máńgi bol aman.

Naqıratı

Cyrillic script

Жайхун жағасында өскен байтерек,
Түби бир, шақасы мың болар демек.
Сен сондай саялы, қуяшлы елсең,
Тынышлық ҳәм ығбал сендеги тилек.

Нақыраты:
Дийхан баба нәпеси бар жеринде,
Жуўсан аңқып, кийик қашар шөлинде.
𝄆 Қарақалпақстан 𝄇 деген атыңды,
Әўладлар әдиўлер жүрек төринде.

Айдын келешекке шақырар заман,
Мәртлик мийнет, билим жеткизер оған.
Халқың бар азамат, дос ҳәм мийирбан,
Еркин жайнап–жаснап, мәңги бол аман.

Нақыраты

IPA transcription (Note: See Karakalpak language#Phonology and Help:IPA.)

[ʑɑjˈχʊn ʑɑ.ʁɑ.sənˈdɑ ɥɵsˈkɘn bɑj.teˈrek |]
[tʉˈbɘ bɘr ɕɑ.qɑˈsə | məɴ boˈɫɑr deˈmek ǁ]
[sen sonˈdɑj sɑ.jɑˈɫə | qʊ.jɑɕˈɫə jelˈseŋ |]
[tə.nəɕˈɫəq hæm əʁˈbɑɫ | sen.deˈɣɘ tɘˈlek ‖]

[nɑ.qə.rɑˈtə]
[diˈχɑn bɑˈbɑ næ.peˈsɘ bɑr ʑe.rɘnˈde |]
[ʑuˈsɑn ɑɴˈqəp | kɘˈjɘk qɑˈɕɑr ɕɵ.lɘnˈde ǁ]
[𝄆 qɑˌrɑ.qɑɫˌpɑ.ʁəsˈtɑn 𝄇 | deˈɣen ɑ.təɴˈdə |]
[æɥ.ɫɑdˈɫɑr æ.dɘɥˈler ʑʉˈrek tɵ.rɘnˈde ‖]

[ɑjˈdən ke.le.ɕekˈke ɕɑ.qəˈrɑr zɑˈmɑn |]
[mærtˈlɘk miˈnet | bɘˈlɘm ʑet.kɘˈzer woˈʁɑn ‖]
[χɑɫˈqəɴ bɑr ɑ.zɑˈmɑt | dos hæm mɘ.jɘrˈbɑn |]
[jerˈkɘn ʑɑjˈnɑp ʑɑsˈnɑp | mæŋˈgɘ boɫ ɑˈmɑn ǁ]

[nɑ.qə.rɑˈtə]

=== English translation ===
A tall poplar grows along Jayhun coast,
Whose roots are a thousand years old.
You are such a shady, sunny place;
You long for happiness and peace.

Chorus:
Your land holds the breath of your farmers' ancestors;
A saiga runs through your deserts.
𝄆 Karakalpakstan 𝄇 is your name,
Your children are in the depths of your hearts.

In a bright future, this era is calling;
Courage and wisdom are presented.
Your people are courageous, friendly and kind;
Blossom and develop forever and freely.

Chorus

Translation:

== See also ==
- List of national anthems
- State Anthem of Uzbekistan
