= Karakalpak Autonomous Soviet Socialist Republic =

1932–1990 autonomous republic of the Uzbek SSR, Soviet Union

Coordinates: 44°N 59°E

Karakalpak Autonomous Soviet Socialist Republic Каракалпакская Автономная Советская Социалистическая Республика (Russian) Қорақалпоғистон Автоном Совет Социалистик Республикаси (Uzbek) Қарақалпақстан Автономиялық Совет Социалистик Республикасы (Karakalpak)
- ASSR of the Uzbek SSR; Autonomous republic of Uzbekistan
- 1932–1990
- Flag (1952–1992) Emblem (1978–1992)

- Karakalpakstan in Uzbekistan
- Capital: Nukus
- Government
  - Type: Autonomous Soviet Socialist Republic
  - Motto: Барлық еллердиң пролетарлары, бирлесиңиз! (Karakalpak) "Workers of the world, unite!"
- History
  - Established: 20 March 1932
  - Sovereignty declared: 14 December 1990
  - Renamed to the Republic of Karakalpakstan: 14 December 1990
  - New constitution: 9 April 1993
Preceded by	Succeeded by
Karakalpak AO	Karakalpakstan Soviet Socialist Republic
- Today part of: Uzbekistan: Karakalpakstan

The Karakalpak Autonomous Soviet Socialist Republic (Karakalpak ASSR; Karakalpak: Қарақалпақстан АССР, Qaraqalpaqstan ASSR; Uzbek: Қорақалпоғистон АССР, Qoraqalpog‘iston ASSR; Russian: Каракалпакская АССР, Karakalpakskaya ASSR), also known as Soviet Karakalpakstan or simply Karakalpakstan, was an autonomous republic within the Soviet Union. Until 20 March 1932, it was called the Karakalpak Autonomous Oblast. On 5 December 1936, it was moved from the Russian SFSR to the Uzbek SSR. It was the only ASSR in Soviet Central Asia (though other ASSRs existed in the region prior to the Karakalpak ASSR's creation, such as the Tajik ASSR and the Kirghiz ASSR, both of which were "upgraded" to union-level republics in 1929 and 1936 respectively).

Its capital was Nukus (Turtkul until 1939).

On 14 December 1990, Karakalpak ASSR declared state sovereignty over the Soviet laws. Uzbekistan declared independence on 31 August 1991 after the events of the failed coup while Karakalpak ASSR was renamed to and re-established as the Republic of Karakalpakstan on 21 December 1991. The Soviet Union was dissolved on 26 December 1991.

The new constitution was adopted on 8 December 1992, thus making Karakalpakstan an autonomous republic within Uzbekistan.

== Demographics ==
Demographics and ethnic composition of the population of Karakalpakstan according to the data of the 1926-1989 censuses

Ethnicities	1926 pop.	%	1939 pop.	%	1959 pop.	%	1970 pop.	%	1979 pop.	%	1989 pop.	%
Total	304,539	100.00	469,702	100.00	510,101	100.00	702,264	100.00	905,500	100.00	1,212,207	100.00
Uzbeks	84,099	27.62	116,054	24.71	146,783	28.78	212,597	30.27	285,400	31.52	397,826	32.82
Karakalpaks	116,125	38.13	158,615	33.77	155,999	30.58	217,505	30.97	281,809	31.12	389,146	32.10
Kazakhs	85,782	28.17	129,677	27.61	133,844	26.24	186,038	26.49	243,926	26.94	318,739	26.29
Turkmens	9,686	3.18	23,259	4.95	29,225	5.73	37,547	5.35	48,655	5.37	60,244	4.97
Russians	4,924	1.62	24,969	5.32	22,966	4.50	25,165	3.58	21,287	2.35	19,846	1.64
Koreans			7,347	1.56	9,956	1.95	8,958	1.28	8,081	0.89	9,174	0.76
Tatars	884	0.29	4,162	0.89	6,177	1.21	7,619	1.08	7,617	0.84	7,767	0.64
Ukrainians	621	0.20	3,130	0.67	2,201	0.43	2,316	0.33	2,005	0.22	2,271	0.19
Bashkirs	29	0.01	381	0.08	571	0.11	854	0.12	920	0.10	1,090	0.09
Kyrgyz	277	0.09	181	0.04	177	0.03	400	0.06	1,955	0.22	867	0.07
Moldovans	10	0.00	16	0.00			57	0.01	343	0.04	632	0.05
Belarusians	30	0.01	214	0.05	328	0.06	517	0.07	852	0.09	567	0.05
Others	2,072	0.68	1,697	0.36	1,874	0.37	2,691	0.38	2,650	0.29	4,038	0.33

== Flags ==
1934-1937

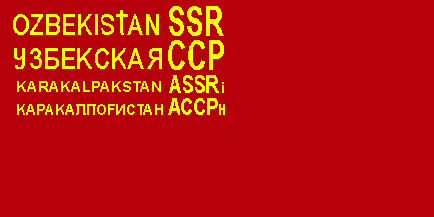
1937-1941

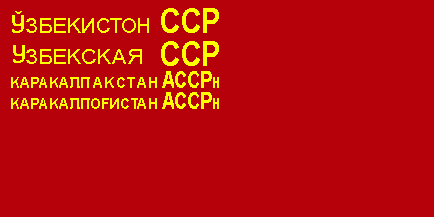
1941-1952

1952-1992

== See also ==
- Karakalpak Regional Committee of the Communist Party of Uzbekistan
