= Khivan campaign =

- Khivan campaign of 1839
- Khivan campaign of 1873
