= Xojeli =

Xojeli: Xojeli, Хожели (Karakalpak); Xöjayli, Хўжайли (Uzbek)
- City
- Central Xojeli Khalfa Erejep Mausoleum at Mizdahkan Mazlumxan Mausoleum Stalinist Univermag building Xojeli District Hokimiyat

- Location within Karakalpakstan Location within Uzbekistan
- Coordinates: 42°24′N 59°27′E
- Country: Uzbekistan
- Autonomous Republic: Karakalpakstan
- District: Xojeli district
- City Administration: Hokimiyat of Xojeli District

Population (2026)
  - Total: 83,400
- Time zone: UTC+5 (UZT)
- Postal index: 231300
- Area code: 61

Xojeli (Note: Karakalpak: Xojeli, Хожели [xoˈʒeli]; Uzbek: Xöjayli, Хўжайли) is a city in central Karakalpakstan, an autonomous republic in Uzbekistan. It is the administrative centre of the Xojeli District, and its population was around 83,400 people as of 2026.

There has been a settlement at Xojeli since prehistoric times. It is in the Amu Darya river delta and it has several natural hills raised slightly above the flat surface in the south-west. The area surrounding the modern city has been occupied since at least the construction of settlements in the Neolithic, with the structures at the Gyaur Kala fortress, on one of the hills, dating to around 4000 BCE. It is a part of the Mizdahkan archeological complex, with several Islamic Mausoleums on the hill next to the fortress. Before the Early Muslim conquests in the 8th century, Mizdahkan was a vital Zoroastrian city. The Mausoleums that remain were mainly built in the Middle Ages, when it was one of the largest cities of Khwarazm.

During its time in the USSR, the city underwent rapid industrialization and increase in agriculture and production of cotton.

Today, Xojeli is a populous city near Nukus, the capital of Karakalpakstan. Its bazaar serves as an alternative market for daily products, to those of Nukus. After the lowering of restrictions on entry to Uzbekistan, the historic sites in Xojeli have started attracting more tourists.

== Etymology ==
The name Xojeli is made up of two parts: the Karakalpak and Uzbek word xoja, meaning 'owner' or 'master'; likely referring to a family line of "Xoja", and the second part eli, that means 'the land of'. Together they mean lit. 'the land of masters'.

== History ==
A map of the Aral Sea region, with city "Khodjeili" depicted near "fort Nurkus" (1851)

=== Khivan Khanate ===
A city in the current location of Xojeli has been established in the 1600s, as a result of migration towards the Aral sea, after Mizdahkan had been desolate since the end of the 14th century. A tribe that migrated to the location of the modern-day city, was likely of the family line of "Xoja"s, giving rise to the current name of the city. During this period Xojeli was a part of the Khivan Khanate, where such tribes had the biggest political power in the region.

During the 17th-18th centuries, the city grew to become one of the biggest in the region of current day central Karakalpakstan, with the construction of canals and development of agriculture, trade, and fishing. Xojeli was considered one of the biggest markets for bread.

During the Khivan campaign of 1873, from 15 to 17 of May, Russian troops faced resistance, but eventually took Xojeli, in what was an attempt of Khivans to stop them before reaching the city. After the full occupation of the Khivan Khanate, of which Xojeli was a part of, in 1873 it became a protectorate. Initially, this had little effect on the life inside the Khanate, however after the introduction of larger taxes there were revolts in the region.

=== Modern history ===
Following the October Revolution, the anti-monarchist tribesmen joined Bolsheviks to dispose of the Khan, and in the February of 1920 Xojeli became a city in the Turkestan ASSR.

In 1927 Xojeli and the surrounding area were given a status of a district in the Karakalpak Autonomous Oblast, later elevated into Karakalpak ASSR. During the Soviet era, the city was greatly expanded, including the construction of a Compressor station, Textile factory, Brick and Asphalt factory, and a Meat processing plant in the district.

== Geography and climate ==
Situated south of the Amu Darya river, Xojeli itself is generally flat, apart from the three mounds south-west of the city:

- a cemetery hill, – 4 kilometers (2.4 mi)
- Jumart Kassab hill – 5.3 kilometers (3.3 mi), 105 m above sea level
- Gyaur Kala hill – 6.5 kilometers (4 mi)

As with most of Central Asia, Xojeli has a cold desert climate (Köppen BWk), with both dry, hot summers and cold winters. The nearest Uzhydromet weather station is in Taqiyatas, around 12 km from the centre of Xojeli, but there is an agro-meteorological measuring station in Xojeli.

== Education ==
There are many public schools in Xojeli, while vocational institutions include Xojeli Transport and Pedagogical Colleges.

== Transport ==
Xojeli is a city that lies on the key route for journeys by road and rail from western Kazakhstan. The A380 International Highway runs around the city, connecting Uzbekistan and the Kazakhstan border in the north-west, as well as the A381 International Highway, that extends from the city to the Turkmenistan border.

Xojeli has a railway station operated by Uzbek Railways on the line from Atyrau, Kazakhstan to Tashkent.

There are marshrutkas that operate on routes within the city and the district. While it lacks public transport, there are buses to and from Nukus's southern Auto station.

There is an inactive aerodrome, sometimes referred to as 'South Nukus', located between Xojeli and Taqiyatas. It lies 6 kilometers (3.7 mi) south-east of the Xojeli city center.

== Notable people ==
- Jumabay Medetbaev (1935-2005), Kazakh actor, People's Artist of Kazakhstan
- Jumagaliy Kaldikaraev (1922-1944), private in the WWII, Hero of the Soviet Union
- Raxilya Miftaxova (1940-2000), opera singer, Honored Artist of the RSFSR
- Yessengaly Raushanov (1957-2021), Kazakh poet
