= Vodnik, Uzbekistan =

Vodnik
- urban-type settlement
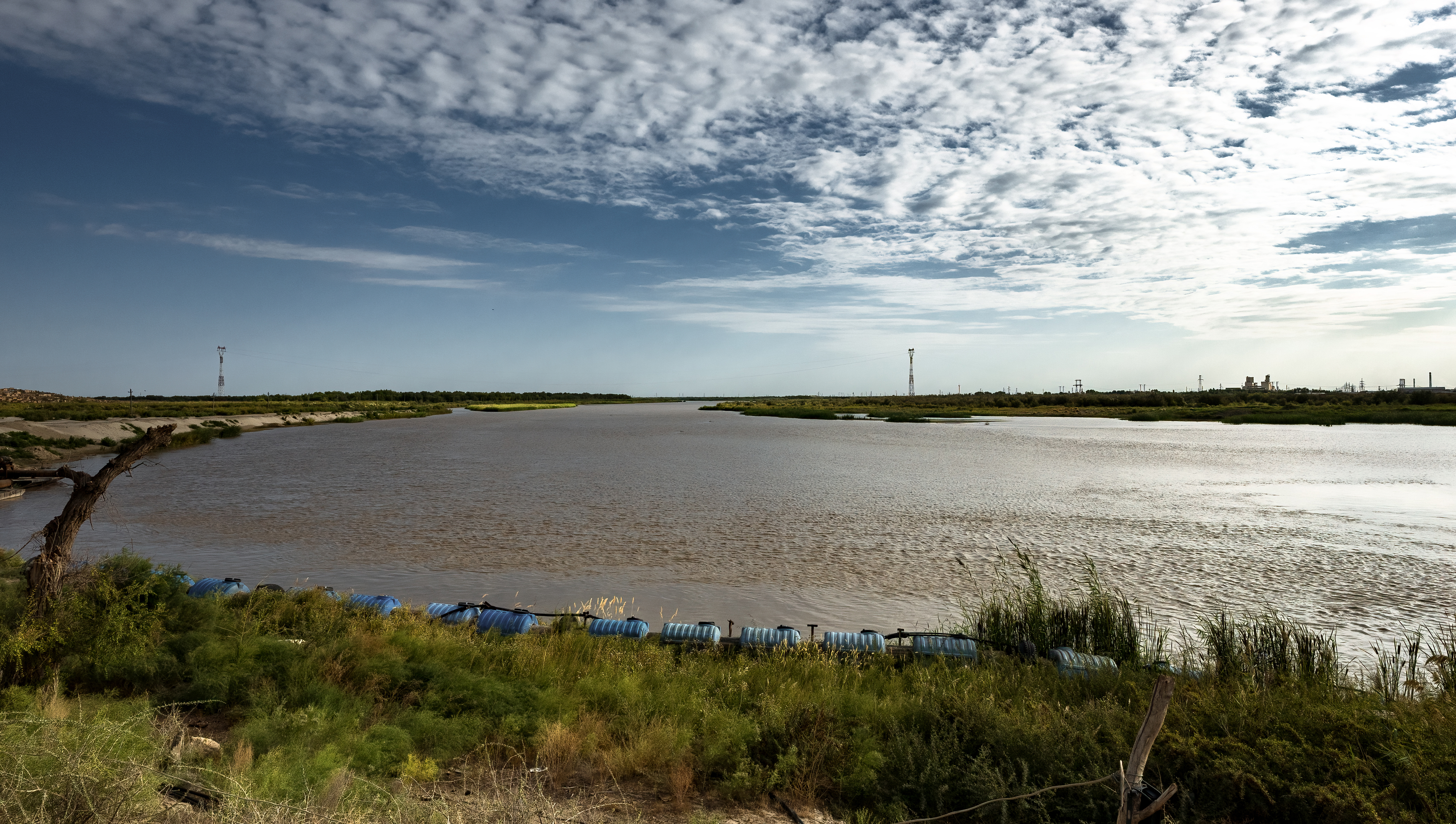
- Amu Darya river near Vodnik

- Location in Uzbekistan
- Coordinates: 42°25′59″N 59°32′24″E
- Country: Uzbekistan
- Autonomous Republic: Karakalpakstan
- District: Xojeli district

Population (2016)
  - Total: 5,900
- Time zone: UTC+5 (UZT)
- Postal index: 231301

Vodnik (Note: Karakalpak: Vodnik, Водник; Russian: Водник [ˈvodʲnʲɪk]) is a town and an urban-type settlement in the Xojeli District, in the south of central Karakalpakstan. The town is situated on the left bank of the Amu Darya river, bordering the Nukus District, about 7 km from the city of Xojeli. Its population was 5,176 people in 1989, and 5,900 in 2016.

Formerly the location of a river dock, with the decline of the incoming water in the Amu Darya, Vodnik no longer serves as a site for disembarking onto the river.

== Etymology ==
Vodnik, also written as Водник, means 'related to water', based on the Russian word Вода 'water'. The area is sometimes also referred to as Pristan' (Пристань), meaning 'Warf', with the train station Taqiyatas-Pristan' located in Taqiyatas.

== Transport ==
The town lies on the highway between Nukus and Xojeli, and is the destination for minibuses from both cities. Because of its proximity to Nukus, an auto-station on the west of the city is about a kilometer from Vodnik, just over the river.

== See also ==
- Xojeli District
- Meaning of Vodnik in Russian (Wikitionary)
