= Siege of Ak-Mechet =

1853 engagement of the Russo-Kokand War

- Part of the Russo-Kokand War
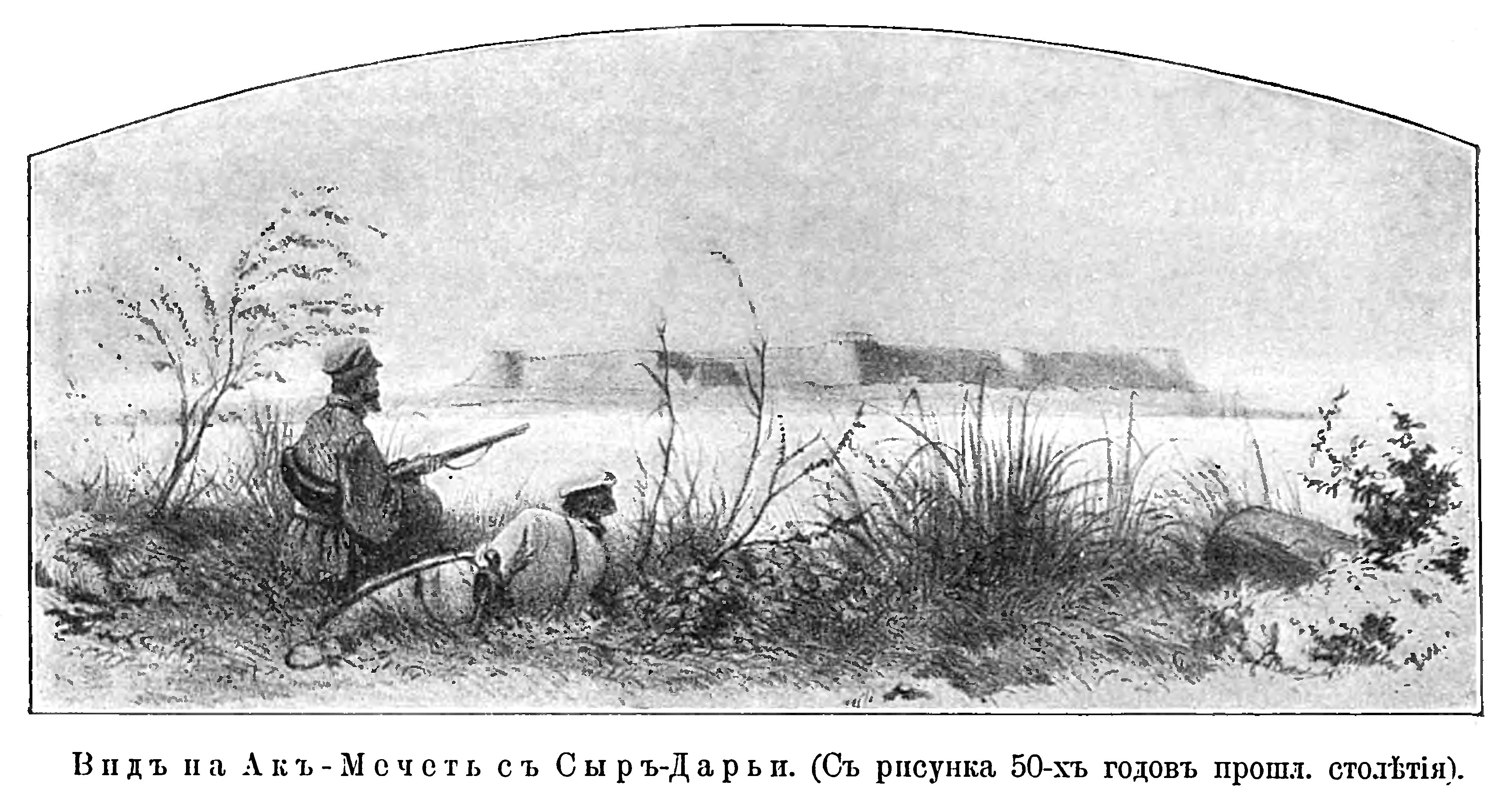
- View of Ak-Mechet from the Syr-Darya by Georg Wilhelm Timm (1856)
Date	2–28 July 1853 (3 weeks and 5 days)
Location	Ak-Mechet, Khanate of Kokand (modern Kyzylorda) 44°51′0″N 65°31′0″E
Result	Russian victory

Belligerents
Russian Empire; Kyrgyz auxiliaries	Khanate of Kokand

Commanders and leaders
(Russian Empire) Vasily Perovsky; (Russian Empire) Stepan Khrulev; (Russian Empire) Alexey Maksheev	(Khanate of Kokand) Abd al-Wali †

Strength
2,168	approx. 300

Casualties and losses
34 killed; 130 wounded; 1 missing	226 killed; 35 wounded

The siege of Ak-Mechet (Note: Russian: Ак-Мечети, lit. 'White Mosque'; also spelled Aq-Masjid) (2–28 July 1853) was the first major engagement of the Russo-Kokand War, fought between the Russian Empire and the Khanate of Kokand. Placed on the defensible Syr Darya river, Ak-Mechet was an important northern outpost of the Kokand Khanate, used as a base to collect tax from Kazakhs in the region, and to control trade between Russia and southern Central Asia. Due to the influence it gave Kokand over the Kazakh Steppe, its capture or destruction became a priority for regional Russian governors.

In 1852, Military-Governor Vasily Perovsky ordered an expedition to destroy the fortress, but this attack was repulsed due to inadequate equipment. Kokand would strengthen the fortress even further afterwards, preparing for another attack. The following year, Perovsky gained permission to expand Russia's fortress line along the Syr Darya, with Ak-Mechet to be captured and converted into a Russian outpost. Hoping to avoid the logistical failures of previous Russian expeditions in Central Asia, Perovsky prepared for several months, assembling a small but strong force with extensive support. On July 2, he attacked the city with a force of over 2,000 men against 300 Kokandi defenders. Despite the numerical disparity, Russian command approached the siege carefully, constructing several artillery batteries, trenches, and extensive mines underneath the fortress. After a ceasefire was declared for negotiations, the Kokandi defenders offered to surrender on the condition they be given 15 days to evacuate, though these terms were denied. On July 21, a detachment was sent ahead to intercept a rumored Kokandi reinforcement, instead finding a small Kokandi fortress which they destroyed. On July 28 the mines were sprung after a prolonged bombardment of the city, and Russian soldiers quickly captured it despite extensive friendly fire.

A majority of the Kokandi defenders were killed during the siege, and those who survived were mostly women and children. Many of the commanders who surrendered were humiliated or executed. The capture of the fort greatly destabilized the Kokand Khanate, which continued to unsuccessfully send raiding and siege parties for over a decade. Ak-Mechet was the first enemy settlement Russia captured during their conquest of Central Asia, and was the first to have its name Russified.

== Background ==
Initially built in 1820, Ak-Mechet was the Kokand Khanate's most influential and critical northern stronghold. The fort was used by Kokand to control Russian trade routes with themselves, the Khanate of Bukhara, and the Khanate of Khiva, as well as center to collect zakat from Kazakh tribes.

An early proposal to attack the fort was raised in a letter dated March 17, 1851 by Governor-General of Orenburg Vladimir Obruchev as part of a larger plan to counter British advances into Afghanistan. His proposal was strongly rejected by Tsar Nicholas I, and he was subsequently removed from office, replaced by Vasily Perovsky.

By 1852, the Russian Empire had begun to prioritize the suppression of Kokandi influence on the Kazakh Steppe, as frequent attacks by Kokandi and Kokandi allied Kazakh forces against Russians and Russian allied Kazakhs was interfering with Russia's goal of capturing Khiva. The capture or destruction of Ak-Mechet was seen by Russia as a critical step to ending these attacks.

=== First attack ===
In July 1852, Orenburg's new Governor-General Vasily Perovsky ordered Colonel Ivan Blaramberg to survey the land from Fort Raim to Ak-Mechet with 125 infantry and 200 Cossacks, and possibly to destroy the fort under certain circumstances. (Note: Sources variously report that the attack was performed fully at Blaramberg's initiative, that it was ordered in the case of Kokandi attack, or that it was ordered if the fort was on the right bank of the Syr Darya.) Upon arrival to Ak-Mechet in July, Blaramberg discovered that the fort's commander Yakub Beg was absent, and subsequently ordered an attack. The siege was largely unsuccessful due to a lack of equipment, including siege ladders and siege artillery, and the expedition was forced to retreat to Fort Raim at a loss of 10 dead and 40 wounded. Blaramberg's forces only managed to burn the fort's outer defenses and destroy three minor forts during the retreat to Fort Raim.

After the failure, Vasily Perovsky organized a second expedition in hopes of successfully capturing the fort and avoid a loss in prestige. Preparing for another attack, Kokandi forces rebuilt and strengthen the fortress. The outer ramparts and buildings were torn down, leaving a square fortress approximately 750 by 750 feet (230 by 230 m) large. Towers were built in the center and corners of the wall, and the two moats were merged into one 12 feet (3.7 m) foot wide ditch.

== Preparation ==
Positions of the forts

In January 1853, Perovsky proposed a plan to war minister Vasily Andreyevich Dolgorukov to build four fortresses at high expense on the right bank of the Syr-Darya, (Note: Costs were estimated at initial price of 173,000 rubles and annual maintenance and supply price of 330,000 rubles.) one of which would be constructed over Ak-Mechet. Perovsky claimed that this could bring fiscal and strategic benefits, though the former was unlikely and possibly mentioned to play down the high costs of the construction and expedition. Tsar Nicholas strongly endorsed the plan, due in part to his positive relations with Perovsky, and it was approved by Dolgorukov.

Perovsky spent spring preparing for the expedition in Fort Raim, hoping to avoid the logistical errors that had caused the failures of the Khivan campaign of 1839 and Blaramburg's attack. To accomplish this, he organized a significantly smaller force of stronger soldiers. Soldiers were gathered from forts across the region, including Orenburg, Orsk, Uralsk, and Aralsk, before rendezvousing at Karabutak. Those who fell ill or became tired during the march to Karabutak were left at the next fort to increase the average fighting strength of the army, and reduce logistical drain. The expedition left Karabutak for Ak-Mechet on May 23 with a total count of 2,168 men, including 550 Ural Cossack cavalry, 500 Bashkir-Meshcheryak cavalry, a sapper battalion, rocket battalion, mortar battalion, and 12 artillery pieces. This force was additionally accompanied by 150 volunteer Kirghiz auxiliaries.

A flotilla was used to transport supplies and troops along the Syr-Darya, including the steamships Perovsky and Obruchev provided by Grigory Butakov. Remaining equipment was carried by a camel caravan provided by native Kazakhs. (Note: The total number of camels has been reported as 1,400 and 2,038) Khazaks also provided crucial service as reconnaissance and guides. The march to Ak-Mechet was difficult, comprising primarily barren terrain with large swarms of mosquitos and horse-flies, and heat reaching 120.2 °F (49.0 °C). Despite this, the expedition suffered no significant losses.

== Siege ==
The Russian plan of siege and assault

On July 2, Perovsky's detachment reached Ak-Mechet, and established a camp 3,600 feet from the fort. He accepted an invitation from fort commander Abd al-Wali to negotiate a peace, and departed with several members of his retinue. Upon Perovsky's arrival at the fort, Abd al-Wali ordered marksmen on the walls to "Fire in volleys!" at Perovsky. Perovsky and his retinue survived the ambush, though two of his horses were wounded. Nervous of a Kokandi attack, Perovsky ordered a forced march of the remaining troops, who arrived between July 3 and July 5.

Evaluating that the 24 foot thick walls were unbreachable with his artillery, Perovsky ordered the construction of a mine into Ak-Mechet, the construction of zigzag trenches, and a bombardment of the fortress. From July 5 to July 8, Lieutenant General Stepan Khrulev directed the construction and movement of 5 batteries in a perimeter around the fort. Captain Alexey Maksheev noted that Khrulev's placement of the batteries meant they more often hit each other than the fortress. He thusly believed that they contributed little to the fortress's capture.

On July 18, Perovsky sent a letter to Abd al-Wali, demanding surrender and stating:

Ak-Mechet is already taken, although you are inside it, and you cannot fail to perceive that without losing any of my men, I am in a position to destroy every one of you.

The Russians have come hither not for a day, nor yet a year, but for ever. They will not retire.

If you wish to live, ask for mercy; should you prefer to die in Ak-Mechet, you can do so; I am not pressed for time, and do not intend to hurry you. I here repeat that I do not come to offer you combat, but to thrash you until you open your gates.

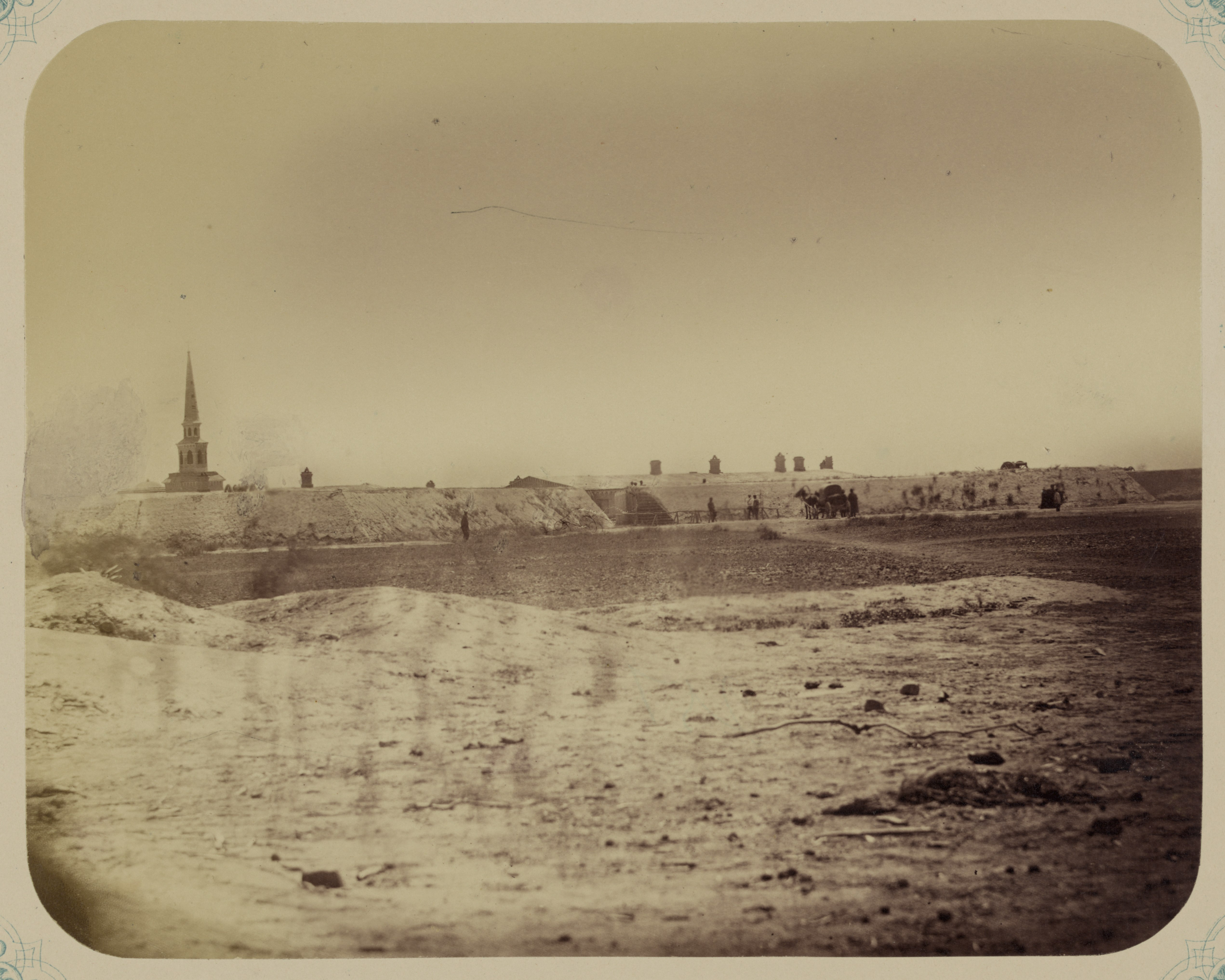
Fort Dzhulek

A ceasefire was declared until evening, when the Kokandi garrison gave its response. The Kokandis criticized Russia's demand to surrender on the grounds that the Russian Empire had not declared war or attempted diplomacy, but accepted if the Russians retreated and gave the Kokandis 15 days to escape. Perovsky rejected these conditions, and restarted construction of siegeworks the following day.

Perovsky maintained a slow and cautious pace during the siege, treating Ak-Mechet like "a strong European fortress". By July 15, this had led to impatience among Russian troops, who had not expected the siege to be prolonged. During the siege, rumors spread among the Kyrgyz auxiliaries responsible for transporting cattle to the Russian lines that Perovsky intended to simply destroy the fort and retreat, leaving them open to revenge from Kokand. The auxiliaries subsequently stopped transporting cattle, leading to a meat shortage among Russian forces. These rumors ended after Perovsky ordered materiel be prepared to garrison the fort, and cattle transports resumed. Approximately 150 Kyrgyz began to assist in the construction of earthworks.

Due to the slow pace of the siege, a lax attitude to safety developed as soldiers became bored. Soldiers often ventured into the fortresses' shady moat to relax, covered from bullet fire by the glacis. Kalmyks in the expedition took to openly walking in between trenches while in the Kokandi line of fire, and stealing watermelons from the gardens outside the fortress walls. The Kalmyks showed Russian forces how to use shovels as makeshift shields by holding wooden shovels flat and iron shovels to the side to minimize damage to the tool.

Kokandi defenders occasionally scaled down the fortress walls and skirmished with Russian forces. The first of these attacks took place on the afternoon of July 19, when 20 Kokandi soldiers bearing swords charged into the nearest trench and captured two Russian soldiers. The soldiers were then reportedly taken into Ak-Mechet and flayed. A similar attack began on July 22, but the Kokandis were spotted descending the fortress wall and shot at until they retreated. Kokandi soldiers also began to construct makeshift grenades by filling leather pouches with gunpowder, inserting a wick, and dousing the grenade in tar.

On July 21, Perovsky dispatched a small force of 200 Cossacks and 50 Bashkirs to search the road to Tashkent for a rumored Kokandi reinforcement coming from the city. On July 23 the force approached fort Dzhulek, and dispatched a message ordering it to surrender. The garrison of 40 Kokandi soldiers fled, and the fort was looted for materiel. The walls were also blown up to determine a safe distance to stand away when mine at Ak-Mechet was sprung. The detachment returned on July 27, the same day the Russian mines were completed.

At 10:00 p.m. on July 27, the final Russian mortar and artillery bombardment began, continuing until 3:00 a.m. the following morning. Russian commanders raised multiple false alarms for the assault to tire the Kokandi defenders and lower their guard. At 3:30 a.m. the mine was sprung, blowing a 240-foot-wide hole in the wall. Russian forces, who had been withdrawn 1,800 feet (550 m) from the fort for safety, were not able to rush the breach before Kokandi soldiers filled the gap. Two batteries fired into the breach with grapeshot, and two companies assisted by 50 Cossacks assaulted the gap. Their first two attacks were repulsed, but the third was successful due to the assistance of a third company. Multiple instances of friendly fire took place during the assault between Russian forces. After the 1st company took the wall, they began firing upon the 2nd company who were pursuing a fleeing Kokandi detachment. The 2nd company then mounted the walls, and mistakenly fired upon the 8th company. At 4:30 a.m., Lieutenant General Khrulev raised his handkerchief over the southern tower in lieu of a Russian flag.

== Aftermath ==
By the end of the battle, 34 Russian soldiers had been killed, 130 had been wounded and one had gone missing. Of the Kokandi garrison, 226 soldiers had been killed, including Abd al-Wali, and 35 had been wounded. Among the Kokandi survivors were 83 women and 67 children, who accounted for most of those who remained. Several of the commanders who surrendered were forced to dress in women's clothing as humiliation, and others were executed. Stories of the defenders being martyred quickly spread through Turkestan, building anti-Russian sentiment. However, Kokandi historian Mullah Yunus Tashkandi defended the attack as part of his opposition to Kokand's leadership, claiming that the women were repatriated to Kokand and the wounded were cared for.

Khudayar Khan, who had only recently regained power after a coup, lost much of his legitimacy because of the defeat. He sent two expeditions to recapture the fort soon after, both of which were strongly repulsed. The first consisted of 7,000 soldiers, who were intercepted and repulsed 25 miles outside of Ak-Mechet. The second occurred in December 1853 and successfully reached the fortress, initiating a three-day-long siege. The siege was broken after the defenders encircled and routed the Kokandi forces. Kokand continued to launch small attacks and raids well into the 1860s.

Ak-Mechet was the first enemy fort Russia captured during their conquest of Central Asia. As per Perovsky's plan, it became a lynchpin in Russia's new fortification line along the Syr-Darya. It was also the first Central Asian settlement to have its name russified, being renamed to Fort Perovsk in honor of Vasily Perovsky.

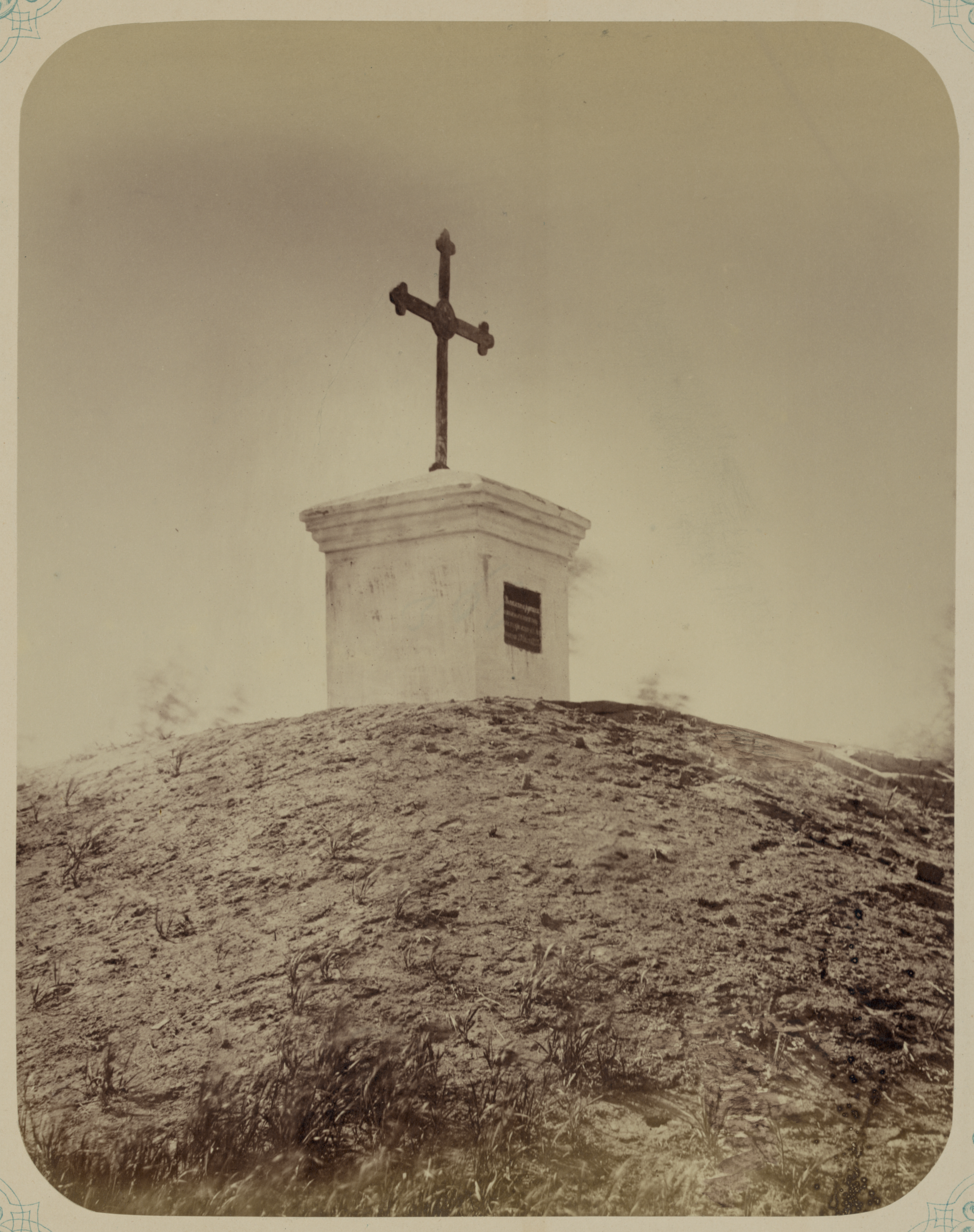
Monument to Russian Soldiers killed in the siege

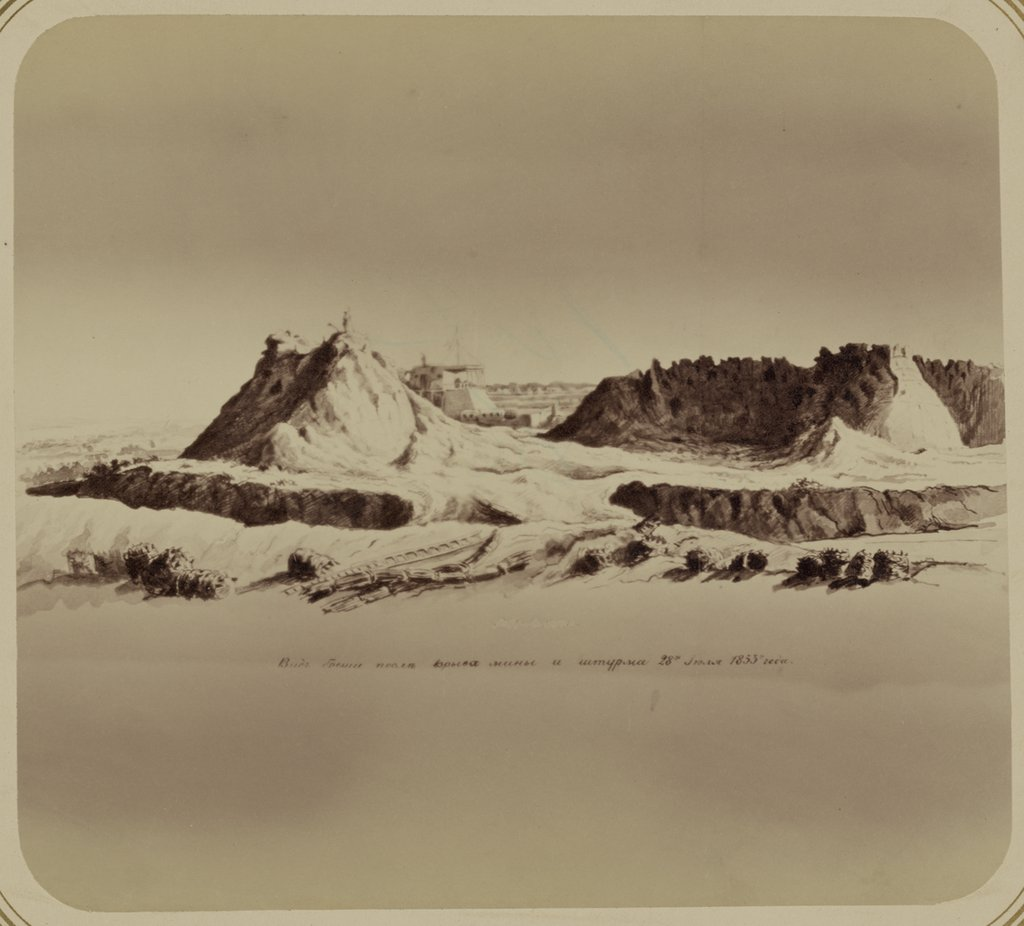
Ak-Mechet after the siege
