= Gyaur Kala =

Ancient city in Karakalpakstan, Uzbekistan

- Karakalpak: Gáwır Qala
- Remaining ruins of Gyaur Kala Fortress

- Location within Uzbekistan
- 42°23′34.4″N 59°22′46.8″E
- Type: Fortress ruins
- Location: Xojeli District, Karakalpakstan, Uzbekistan
- Region: Khwarazm
- Part of: Mizdahkan complex

History
- Founded: 4,000 BC
- Demolished: 1221

Site notes
- Condition: Ruined
- Public access: Limited

Gyaur Kala (Karakalpak: Gáwır Qala [gæwɯr qala]) was an ancient Zoroastrian city in present-day Karakalpakstan. It is part of the Mizdahkan archeological complex.

== Name ==
The name comes from an Arabic term Kafir, that refers to non-Muslims. Alternatively, the name could have been more directly related to the Persian equivalent Gabr. The name in use today likely stems from the 7-8th centuries, when the Muslim conquest of Transoxiana took place.

== History ==
The earliest structures at the fortress date to around 4,000 BC. Later, in 9-11th centuries, the city grew greatly, and a fortified citadel was built

Gyaur Kala fortress was destroyed in 1221 during the Mongol invasion of the Khwarazmian Empire and ever since is in ruins.
