= Yessengali =

Yessengali or Yessengaly is a given name and surname. People associated with this name include:

- Darkhan Yessengali
- Yessengaly Raushanov
