= Xojeli District =

Coordinates: 42°24′36″N 59°25′48″E

Xojeli district: Xojeli rayonı (Karakalpak); Xoʻjayli tumani (Uzbek)
- District
- Xojeli Hokimiyat (Administrative building)
- Interactive map of boundaries as of 2026
- Country: Uzbekistan
- Autonomous Republic: Karakalpakstan
- Capital: Xojeli
- Incorporated: 1927
- Administrative building: 14 Mustaqillik Street, Xojeli

Government
  - Type: City Administration
  - Body: Kengash of People's deputees of Xojeli District
  - Mayor (Hokim): Jengis Ermashev (UzLiDeP)

Area
  - Total: 550 km^{2} (210 sq mi)

Population (2026)
  - Total: 131,575
  - Rank: 7th
  - Density: 240/km^{2} (620/sq mi)
- Time zone: UTC+5 (UZT)

Xojeli district (Note: Karakalpak: Xojeli rayonı, Хожели районы [xoˈʒeli rayonɯ]; Uzbek: Xoʻjayli tumani, Хўжайли тумани) is one of 16 districts of Karakalpakstan. Its seat and only city is Xojeli. It is bordered by districts Nukus and Qanlıkól to the north,Taqiyatas to the east, and Shomanay to the west, as well as Turkmenistan to its south.

Geographically, Xojeli district is mostly bound by the Amu Darya river and the Turkmenistan border. The southern area is the more populous part of the district, with its channels extending from Amu Darya and the Mizdahkan archeological complex, while agriculture is predominant in the northern parts of the district.

== Administrative History ==
The district was first incorporated in 1927, within the Karakalpak Autonomous Oblast, as one of 10 regions that comprised it. The Oblast was later elevated into Karakalpak ASSR. In 1960 after the abrogation of the Shomanay district, a part of it was transferred to the Xojeli district.

After Uzbekistan declared independence, with the adoption of the Constitution of Uzbekistan in 1992, it became a district in the autonomous Republic of Karakalpakstan.

In 2017, the south-eastern part of its territory was given for the creation of the Taqiyatas district.

== Settlements ==
Settlements by type
| Type | Settlement |
|---|---|
| City | Xojeli |
| Urban-type settlement, town | Vodnik |
| Rural communities | Amiwdarya, Jańajap, Qalap, Garezsizlik, Qumjiqqin, Sarıshunkôl, Samankôl |

There are 28 Neighborhood authorities(Mahalla), in Xojeli District.

== Politics and governance ==
=== Local government ===
The local authority is Xojeli district Kengash of People's deputees, led by the Hokim, which meets at the Hokimiyat building at 14 Mustaqillik street, Xojeli. Appointed as the Hokim in 2018, Jengis Ermashev of UzLiDeP, as of 2026, is the representative of the 13th electoral district to the Xojeli Kengash.

Following the 2024 election, 15 seats are held by the ruling coalition of UzLiDeP and Milliy Tiklanish(12 and 3 seats respectively), 5 seats by the XDP, 3 Seats by the Ecological Party, and 2 by Adolat.

=== Supreme Council of Karakalpakstan ===
The district has two representatives to the Jokargy Kenes of Karakalpakstan. Following the 2024 election these two positions are held by Tajibay Romanov and Muxtar Ibragimov, members of Milliy Tiklanish and UzLiDeP respectively.

=== Oliy Majlis ===
Xojeli district is part of the third electoral district to the Legislative Chamber of Oliy Majlis, which includes Moynaq, Qońirat, Qanlikól, Shomanay, Taqiyatas, and Xojeli districts. As a result of the 2024 Uzbek parliamentary election that seat is held by Guljan Xalmuratova of UzLiDeP.
