= Fort Raim =

Coordinates: 46°04′18.1″N 61°43′41.5″E

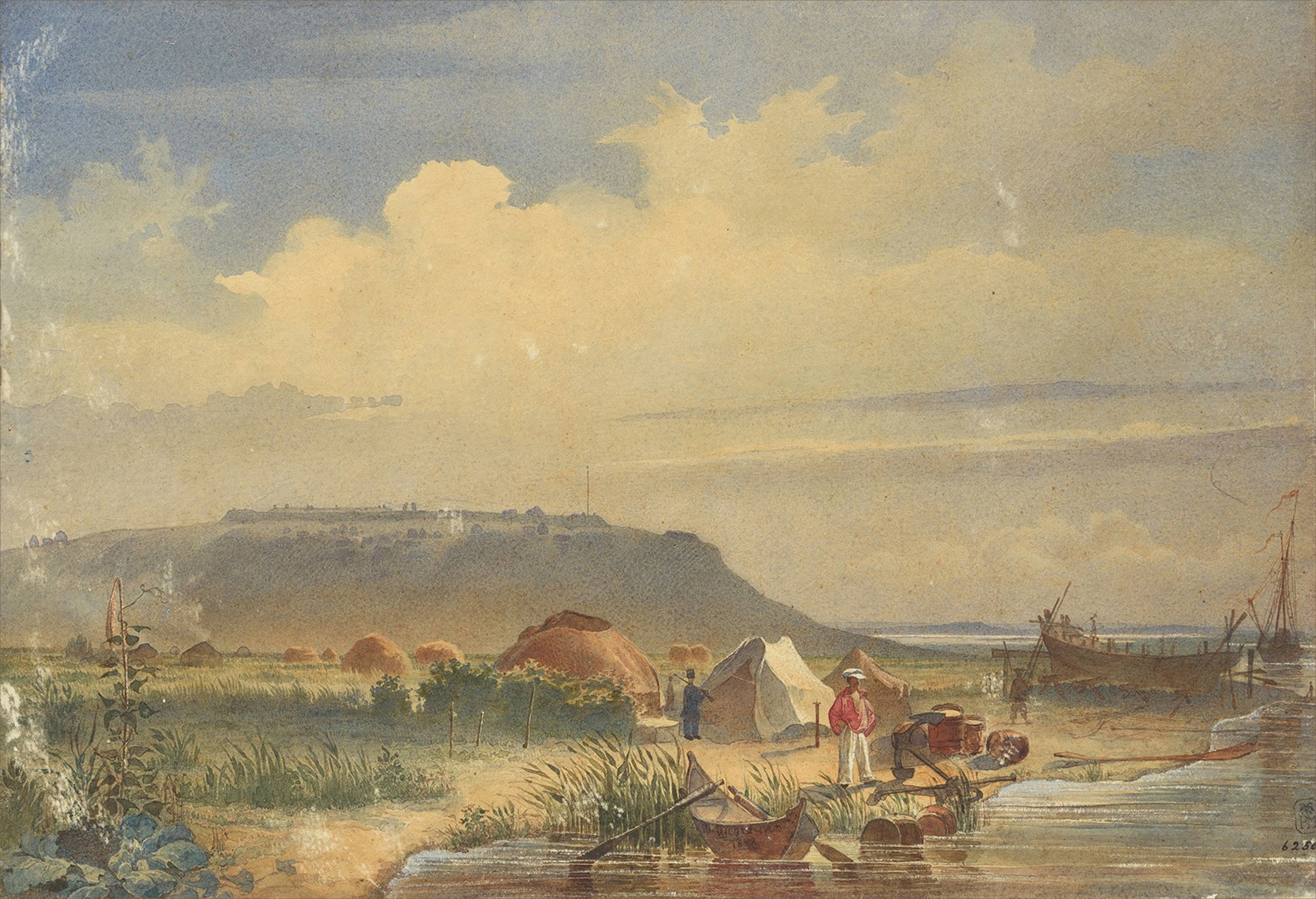
Fort Raim (on hill in background) by Taras Shevchenko, June 1848

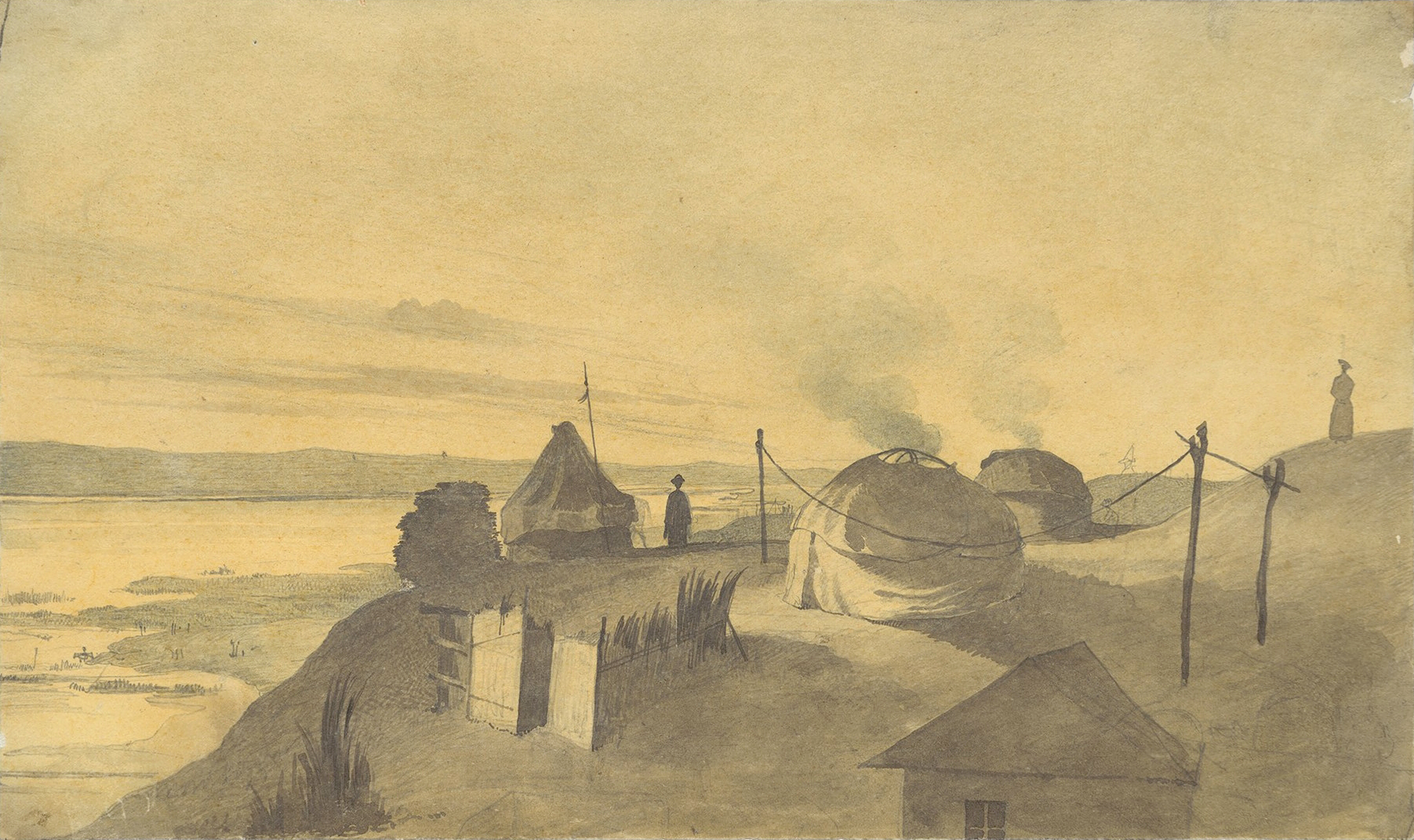
Shevchenko's view from the fort to the north-west, June 1848

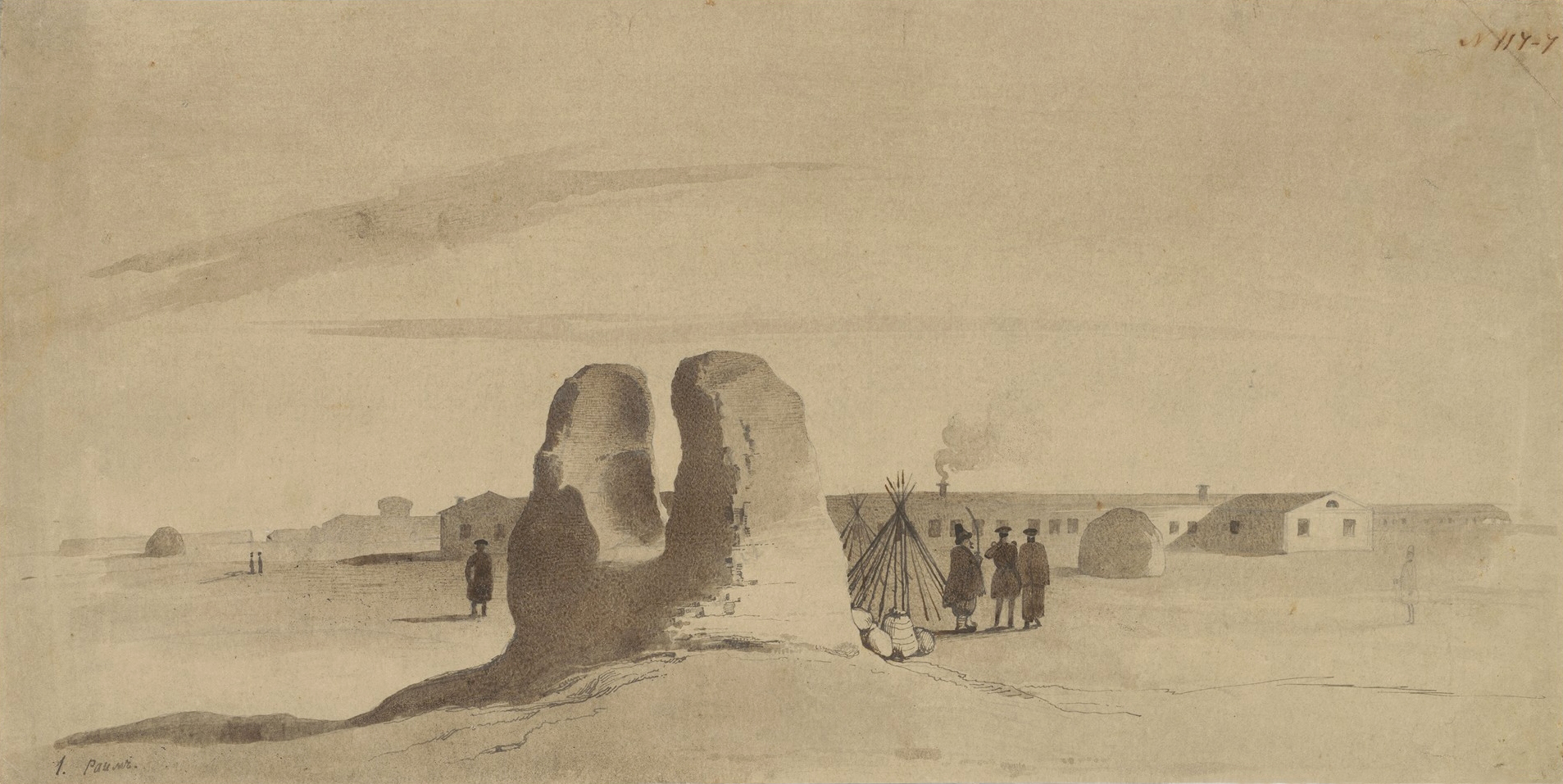
Shevchenko's depiction of the remains of the mausoleum of Raiymbek Batyr with some of the fort's quarters in the background

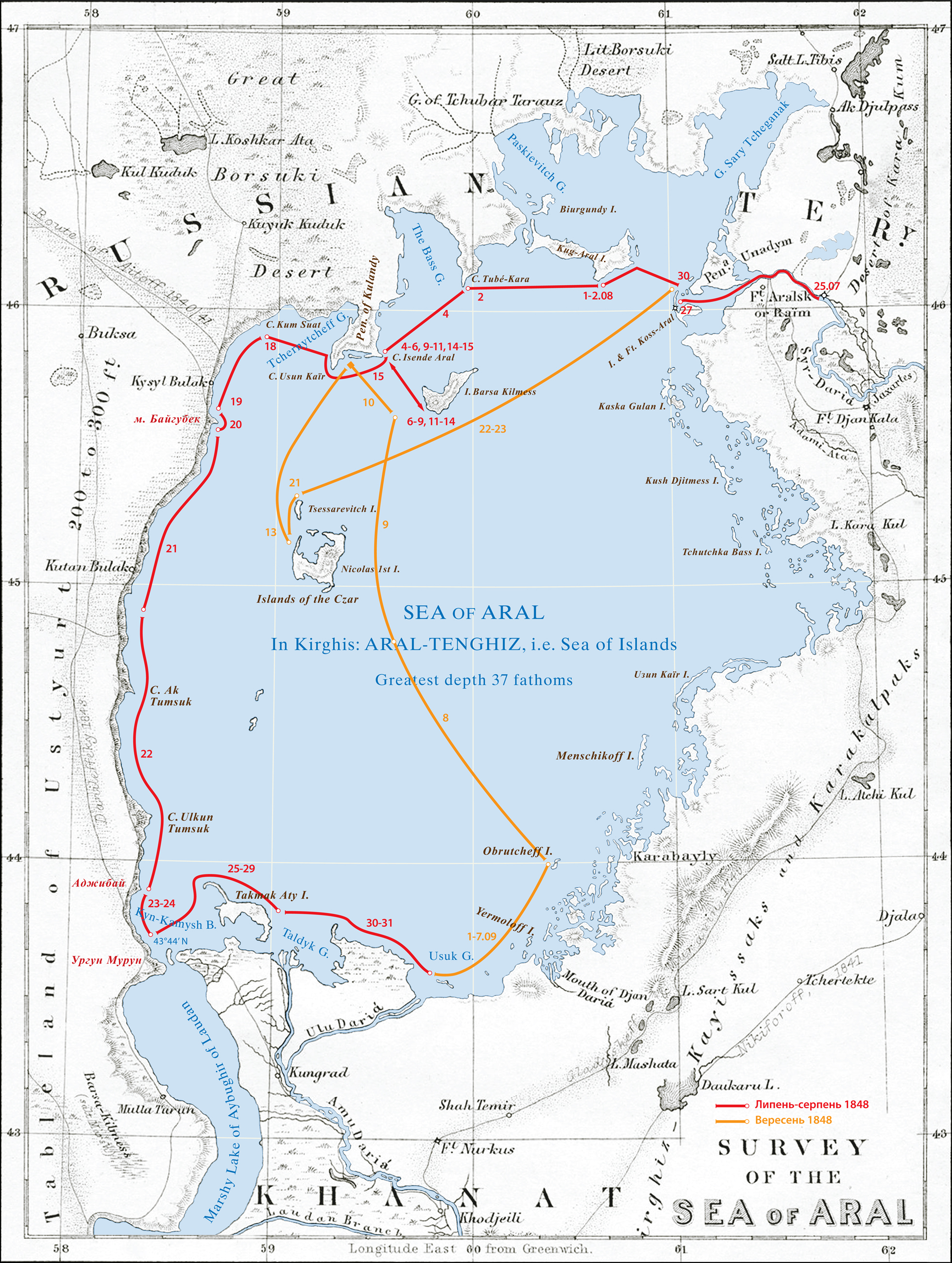
1848 surveys of the Aral Sea, Fort Raim at upper right

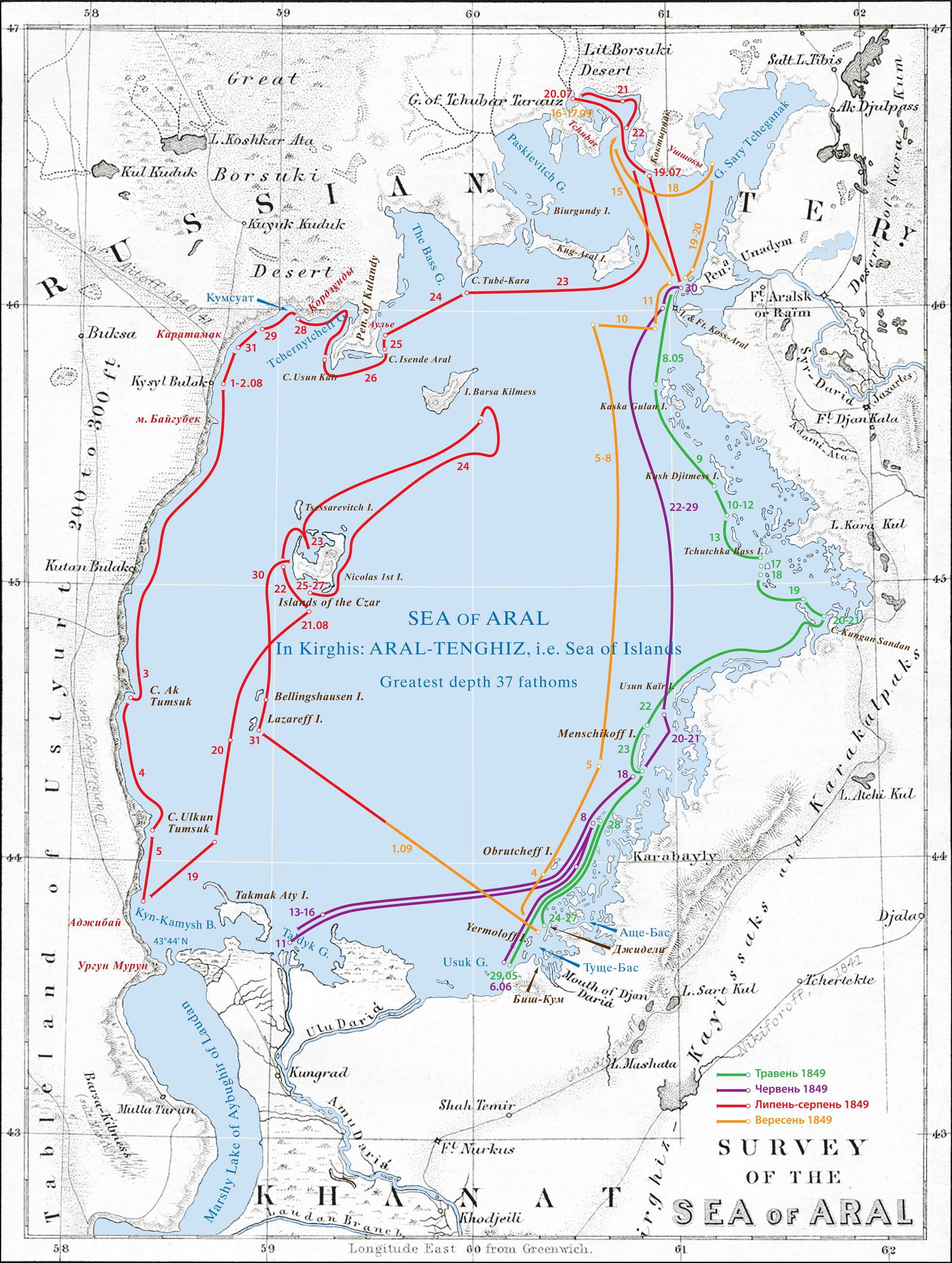
1849 surveys of the Aral Sea

Fort Raim (also Rayim or Raimsk and, later, Fort Aral or Aralsk) was a Russian military outpost at the mouth of the Syr Darya river with the Aral Sea, in modern-day Kazakhstan. Established in 1847 the fort was intended to form a new, fixed frontier of the Russian Empire. Its construction led to conflict with the Khanate of Khiva and the Khanate of Kokand. The fort allowed for exploration of the Aral Sea and a shipyard was built there to support a flotilla of vessels carried overland, these vessels explored the sea and nearby rivers and discovered numerous islands, previously unknown. Fort Raim proved an unhealthy and overcrowded post and was abandoned in favour of Fort No. 1, to the south-east, in 1855. The plan to fix the frontier on the barren steppe proved unworkable and Russia expanded further south and east into the fertile lands around Tashkent.

== Establishment ==
The fort was sited at the mouth of the Syr Darya river with the Aral Sea. The fort was established in 1847 on the order of Obruchev, governor of Orenburg. Fort Raim was built on a hilltop, around the ruined mausoleum of Kazakh warrior Raiymbek Batyr. Building materials (including bricks, tar, lime and three complete windmills) and other supplies were carried to the site from Orenburg by 1,300 camels in May 1847. There was little timber nearby, this had to be brought from Bashkiria, 1,000 versts (663 miles, 1,067 km) away, but the surrounding clay marshland provided good material for locally made bricks. Some 1,500 Russian soldiers and workmen and Kazakh and Bashkir labour helped build the fort, which was complete by the end of the year. The only fuel available was reeds.

The construction of Fort Raim was part of an attempt to secure Russia's border along the line of the Syr Darya. It was the last in a chain of forts and Cossack settlements that ran from the Ural Mountains to the Aral and was intended to cut off communications between the Kyrgyz people of the Caspian Sea region and those to the east.

== Service history ==
The construction of the fort caused conflict with the Khanate of Khiva and the Khanate of Kokand, who had long inhabited the lower Syr Daria region. The Kokandians, under Yaqub Beg attacked the Kazakhs, who had co-operated with the Russians and drove them from their pastures near Raim. The commander of Fort Raim, Lieutenant-Colonel Erofeev sent out patrols to protect the Kazakhs but these were only temporarily successful. The Kyrgyz guerrilla Izzat Kutebar unsuccessfully attacked a Russian caravan near the fort in 1848. Rumours of a largescale Khivan attack on the fort in 1849 came to nothing. A Russian force afterwards captured the Khokandian fort at Ak-Mechet, which was renamed Fort Perovsky, after General Vasily Perovsky who commanded the assault. Russia afterwards planned to extend its line of forts from Raim, but was interrupted by the Crimean War (1853–56). General Obruchev started a Russian settlement at the site in 1849 when the families of 25 of his soldiers were brought there.

Fort Raim was the first point of access for Russia to the Aral Sea and served as the centre for its initial explorations of it. A shipyard was established at the site and two dismantled ships carried there in 1848. These ships were the first of many (that came to be known as the Aral Flotilla) that would be assembled at Raim and used for the exploration of the sea and its rivers. The first naval expedition in 1848 included Ukrainian artist Taras Shevchenko who painted several landscapes of Fort Raim and the wider area. This, and later expeditions, found numerous islands in the Aral Sea, uninhabited and unknown to those dwelling on the shore.

== Abandonment and legacy ==
Fort Raim was useful as a base to explore the Aral Sea and its rivers but not for projecting power over the wider Eurasian Steppe. The attempt to fix Russia's frontier here, on barren Steppeland, proved unviable and the Russian Empire looked further south and east to the fertile lands near Tashkent. The coming decades saw great Russian expansion in this region.

Fort Raim was regarded as an unhealthy and overcrowded post. There was no suitable fodder nearby for horses, which could not graze the marshlands, and supplies of young reeds and barley had to be purchased from the Kazakhs. A new fort, Fort No. 1, was constructed to the south-east from 1853. The Fort Raim garrison moved to Fort No. 1 in 1855, the new post developed into the Russian town of Kazalinsk in 1867 (modern-day Kazaly).

Fort Raim is the site of a fictional assault in the 1973 novel Flashman at the Charge, set in 1854–55.
