= Taqiyatas district =

Taqiyatas district Тақыятас районы, Taqiyatas rayoni
- District
- Taqiyatas district
- Location in Uzbekistan
- Coordinates: 42°20′N 59°34′E
- Country: Uzbekistan
- Autonomous Republic: Karakalpakstan
- Capital: Тақыятас, Taqiyatas
- Established: 2017

Area
  - Total: 180 km^{2} (69 sq mi)

Population (2022)
  - Total: 75,500
  - Density: 420/km^{2} (1,100/sq mi)
- Time zone: UTC+5 (UZT)

Taqiyatas district (Karakalpak: Taqiyatas rayonı, Тақыятас районы) is a district of Karakalpakstan in Uzbekistan. Its seat is the city of Taqiyatas. It was created in 2017 from part of Xojeli district. Its area is 180 km^{2} (69 sq mi) and it had 75,500 inhabitants in 2022. The district contains one city Taqiyatas, one town, Naymanko'l, and three village councils Keneges, Naymanko'l, and Sarayko'l.
