= Khivan campaign of 1873 =

1873 Imperial Russian conquest of the Khanate of Khiva

Russo-Khivan War of 1873
- Part of the Russian conquest of Central Asia
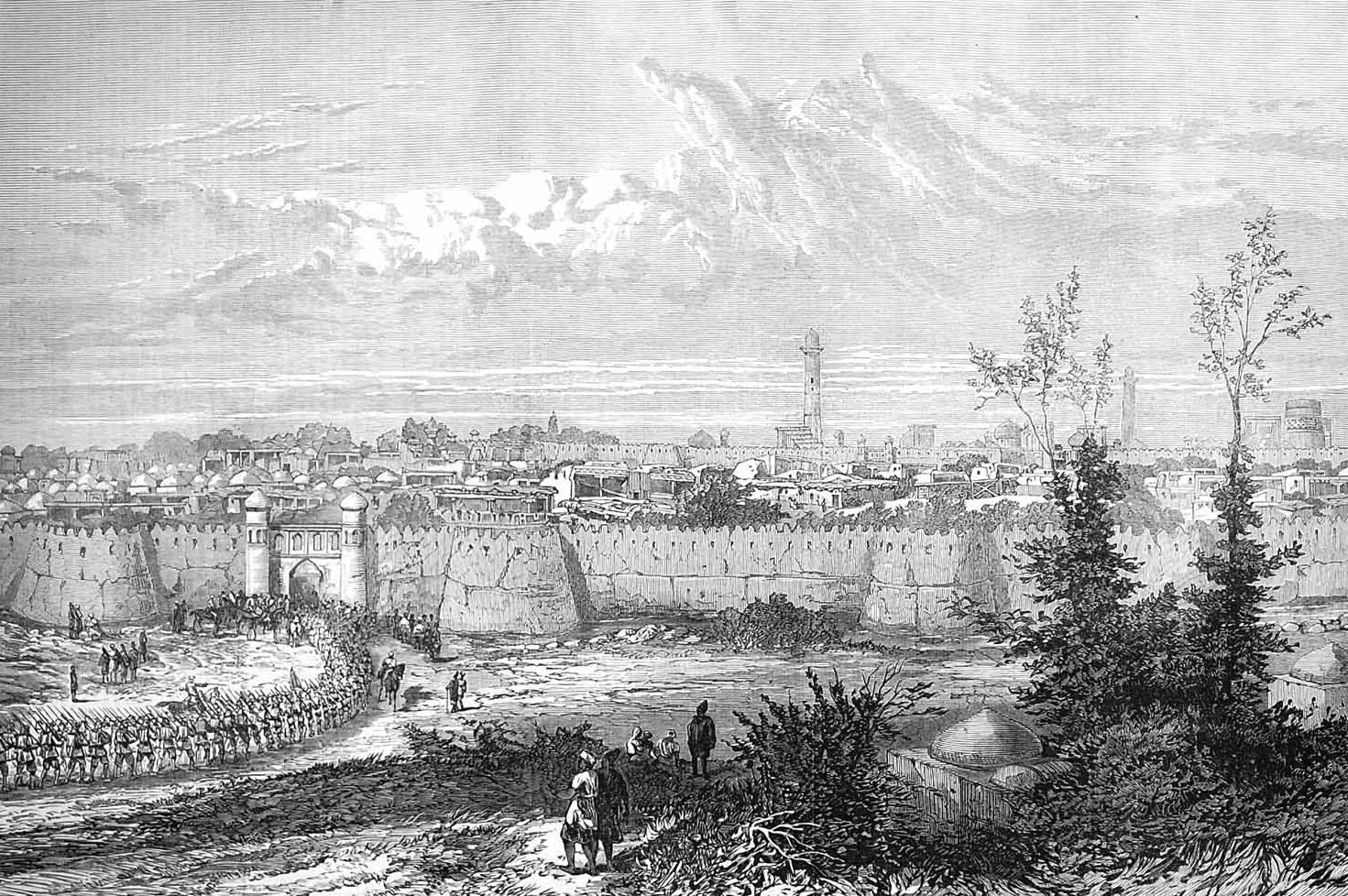
- Russian forces entering Khiva, 1873
Date	11 March – 14 June 1873
Location	Khiva
Result	Russian victory
Territorial changes	Khiva becomes a Russian protectorate

Belligerents
Russian Empire	Khanate of Khiva

Commanders and leaders
(Russian Empire) Alexander II (Russian Empire) K. von Kaufman	Muhammad II

Strength
(Russian Empire) 13,000 troops	Unknown

Casualties and losses
(Russian Empire) 33 killed and 124 wounded	5,000+ killed

In the Russo-Khivan War of 1873, Russia conquered the Khanate of Khiva, and it became a Russian protectorate.

== Background ==
Twice before, Russia had failed to subjugate Khiva. In 1717, Prince Bekovitch-Cherkassky marched from the Caspian and fought the Khivan army. The Khivans lulled him with diplomacy, then slaughtered his entire army, leaving almost no survivors. In the Khivan campaign of 1839, Count Perovsky marched south from Orenburg. The unusually cold winter killed most of the Russian camels, forcing them to turn back.

By 1868, the Russian conquest of Turkestan had captured Tashkent and Samarkand, and gained control over the khanates of Kokand in the eastern mountains and Bukhara along the Oxus River. This left a roughly triangular area east of the Caspian, south of the Aral Sea and north of the Persian border. The Khanate of Khiva was at the north end of this triangle.

== Preparations ==
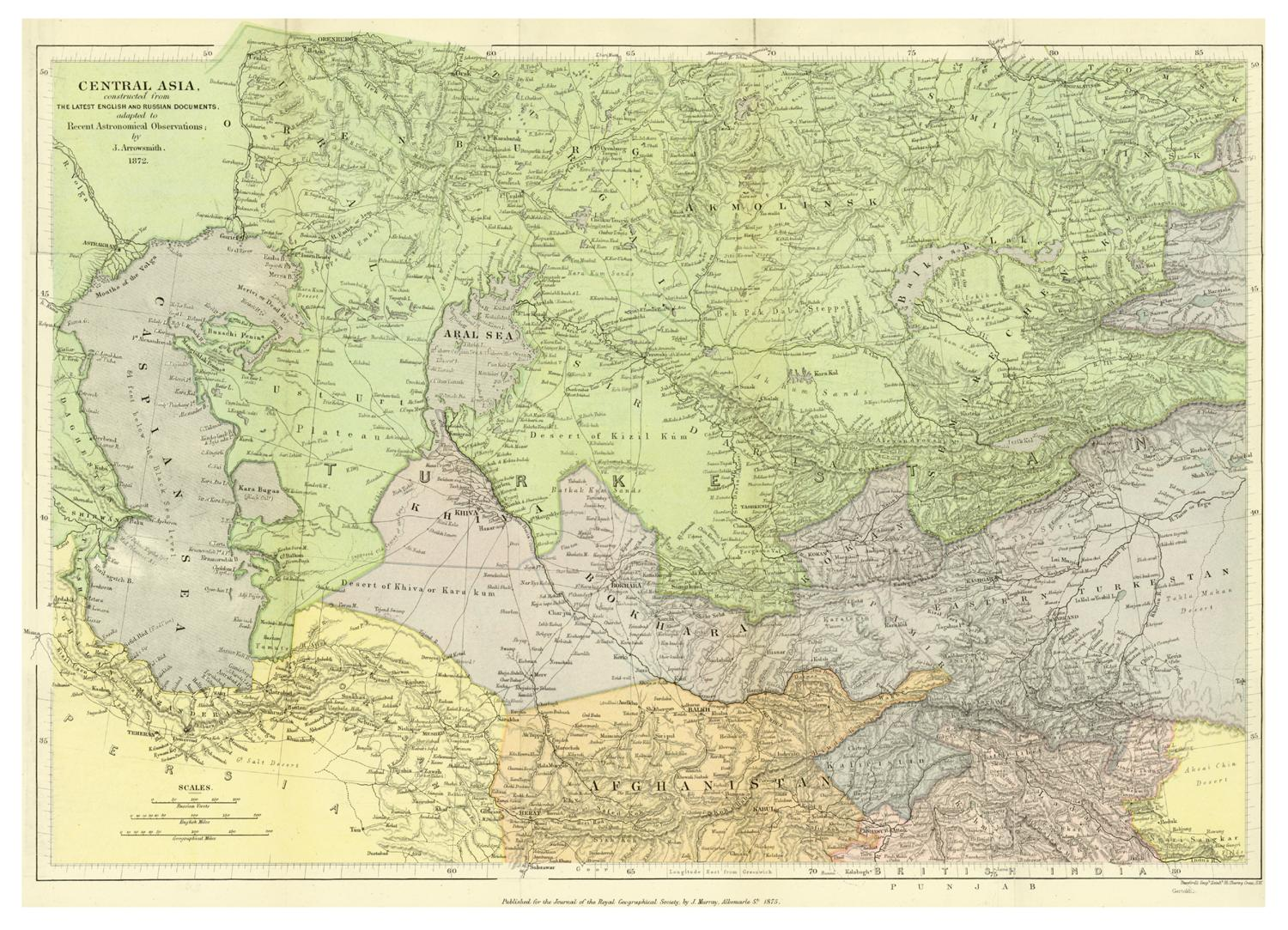
Map of Central Asia in 1872

In 1869, Fyodor Radetsky founded Krasnovodsk, which later became the headquarters of the Trans-Caspian Military District and the start of the Trans-Caspian railway. In March 1870, the decision was made to attack Khiva. Because Khiva was an oasis surrounded by several hundred miles of desert, this desert had to be mapped and waterholes found before armies could move. Mikhail Skobelev mapped a route from Krasnovodsk to the edge of the oasis, and Colonel Vasily Markozov later explored the area more thoroughly. Nikolai Lomakin explored the Mangyshlak Peninsula. In September 1872, Colonel Markozov started from Krasnovodsk and Chikishlyar; he planned to make a dash to Khiva, but was called back by the Viceroy of the Caucasus. In the east, Konstantin Kaufman sent parties into the desert south of the Syr-Darya.

Five armies against Khiva

In December 1872 the Czar made the final decision to attack Khiva. The force would be 61 infantry companies, 26 of Cossack cavalry, 54 guns, 4 mortars and 5 rocket detachments. Khiva would be approached from five directions. (1) General von Kaufmann, in supreme command, would march west from Tashkent and meet a second force moving south from (2) Fort Aralsk. The two would meet in the middle of the Kyzylkum Desert at Min Bulak and move southwest to the head of the Oxus delta. Meanwhile, (3) Veryovkin would go south from Orenburg along the west side of the Aral Sea and meet (4) Lomakin coming directly east from the Caspian Sea while (5) Markozov would march northeast from Krasnovodsk (later changed to Chikishlyar). The reason for this odd plan may have been bureaucratic rivalry. The governor of Orenburg had always had primary responsibility for Central Asia. Kaufmann's newly conquered Turkestan Province had many active officers, while the Viceroy of the Caucasus had by far the most troops.

== The two eastern armies ==
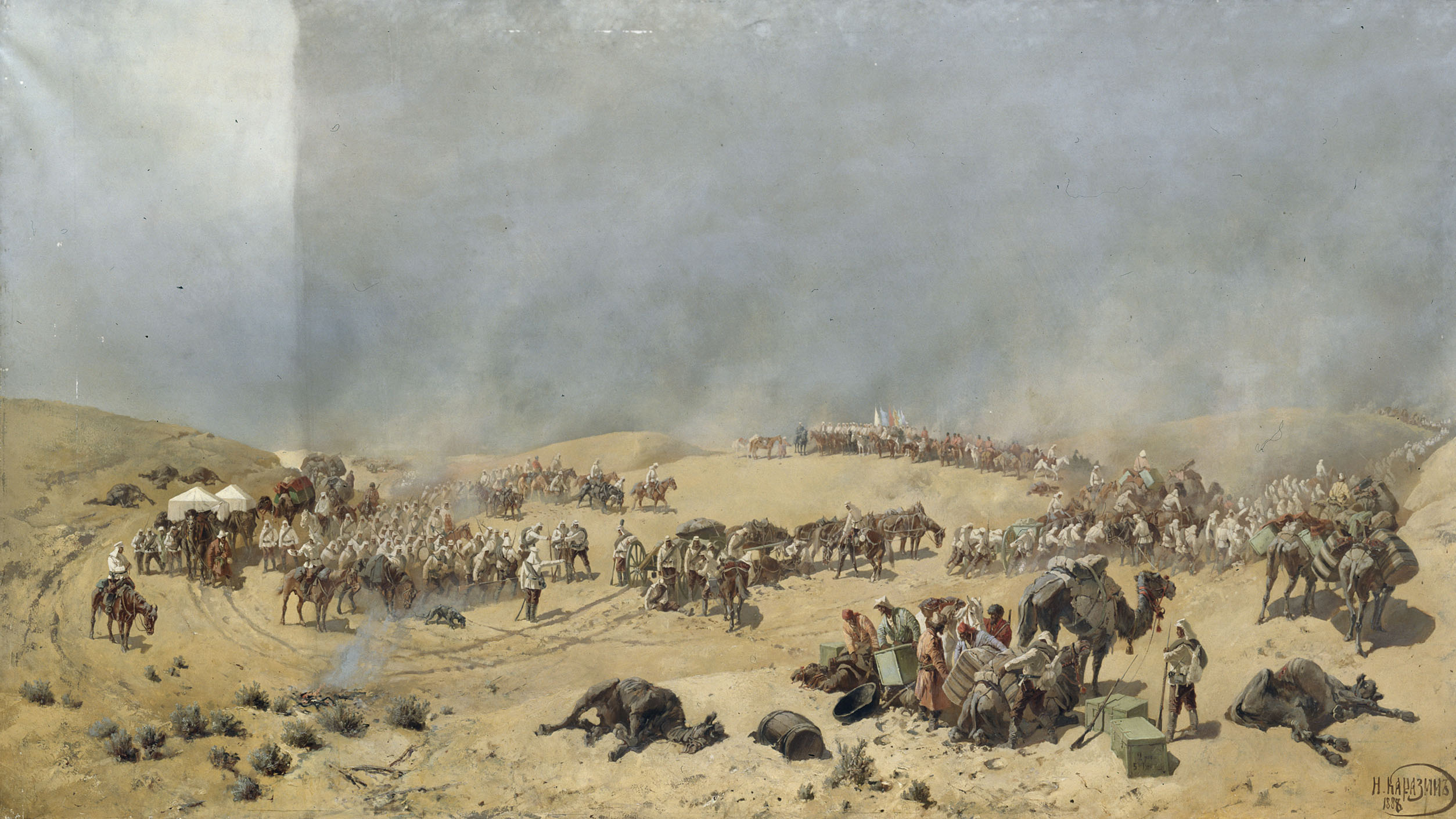
Kaufmann runs short of water

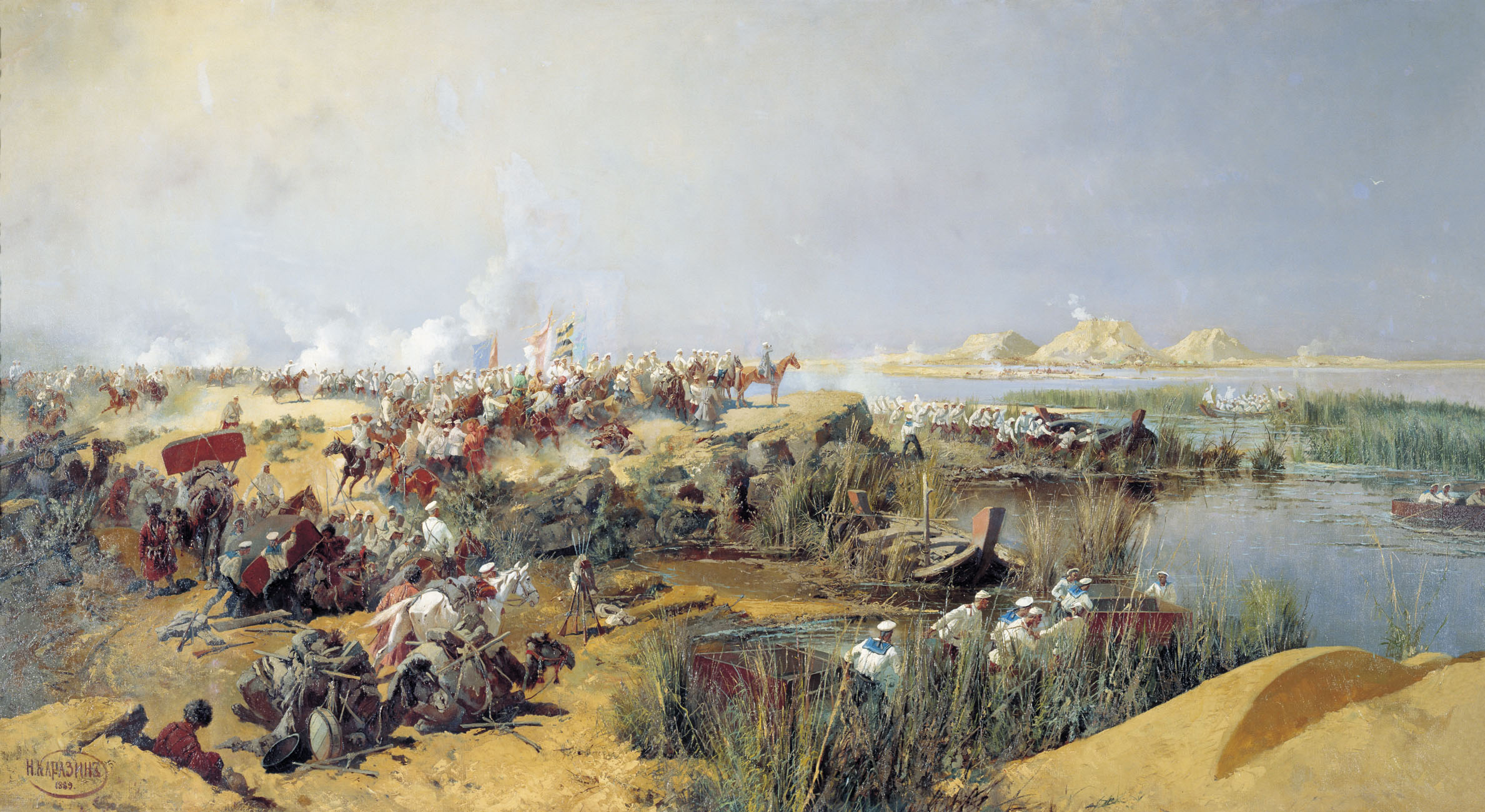
Kaufmann crosses the Oxus at Sheik Arik, 30 May 1873

The Aralsk force set out on 11 March 1873, then Kaufmann started from Jizzakh on 23 March. On 13 April, Kaufmann issued new orders: both forces would turn southwest, meet at Khala-Ata about 130 miles east of the head of the delta, then march west to the Oxus. The new route had not been mapped, a dangerous thing in the desert. On 6 May, the two forces met at Khala-ata, spent time resting and digging wells, then moved out on 12 May. On 17 May, they moved out with what they thought was a 3-day supply of water, but by nightfall the water was gone. A Kazakh found a small waterhole a few miles north, and the camels were sent back to bring a new load of water. By this time, so many camels were weak or dying that they had to abandon most of their supplies.

They reached the Oxus at Uch-Uchak on May 23. They silenced a Khivan battery at Sheik-Arik and spent three days crossing the river unopposed. Now on the populated side, Kaufmann announced that he would pay for any supplies, which he did, but if supplies did not appear he would take them by force. On June 4 he occupied the abandoned fort of Hazarasp and received a letter from the Khan offering terms and another message from Veryovkin who had just taken Kungrad. The campaign was now almost over except for the problem of the western armies. (Uch-Uchak is on the Oxus about 30 miles southeast of the start of the delta. Hazarasp is in head of the delta 50 miles northwest of Uch-Uchak. 30 miles west of Hazarasp is Khiva. Kungard is around 140 miles north-northwest of Khiva at the northwest corner of populated part of the delta, north of which there are marshes and then Lake Aral.)

== The three western armies ==
- Markozov (5), instead of starting from Krasnovodsk as planned, started from Chikishlyar near the southwest corner of the Caspian where he could find more camels. He left on March 31 and reached Igdi at the bend of the Uzboy River a month later. He pushed forward, ran out of water and was forced to retreat. The last stragglers reached Krasnovodsk on May 26. (Later in the year Skobelev led a detachment from near Khiva and reported that the desert beyond Markozov's turning point was impassible for an army.)
- The Orenburg (3) forces under Veryovkin started from Orenburg, Orsk and Uralsk in late February, had a difficult time because of the cold and reached the Emba River on March 15–17. He moved out on April 7, the weather had warmed, he had no difficulty moving down the west shore of the Aral Sea and reached the edge of the oasis on May 14. On May 20 he took the abandoned fort of Kungard at the northwest corner of the delta. He moved out on May 23, won two small battles and was joined by Lomakin's force on May 24.
- Lomakin (4) started from Kinderli, which was perhaps unwise since there were not enough camels at that place. He left on April 26. The heat was intense, the wells far apart, the water poor, camels began to die and soldiers grew sick and had to be carried. On May 10 they ran out of water and would have been lost had not a small well been found. On the 17th Skobelev captured a caravan with provisions and 150 camels. They joined Veryovkin on May 24. (Note: Indian Officer’s dates may be off by a day or two and some of his troop movements are hard to follow.)

== Khiva captured (June 10, 1873) ==
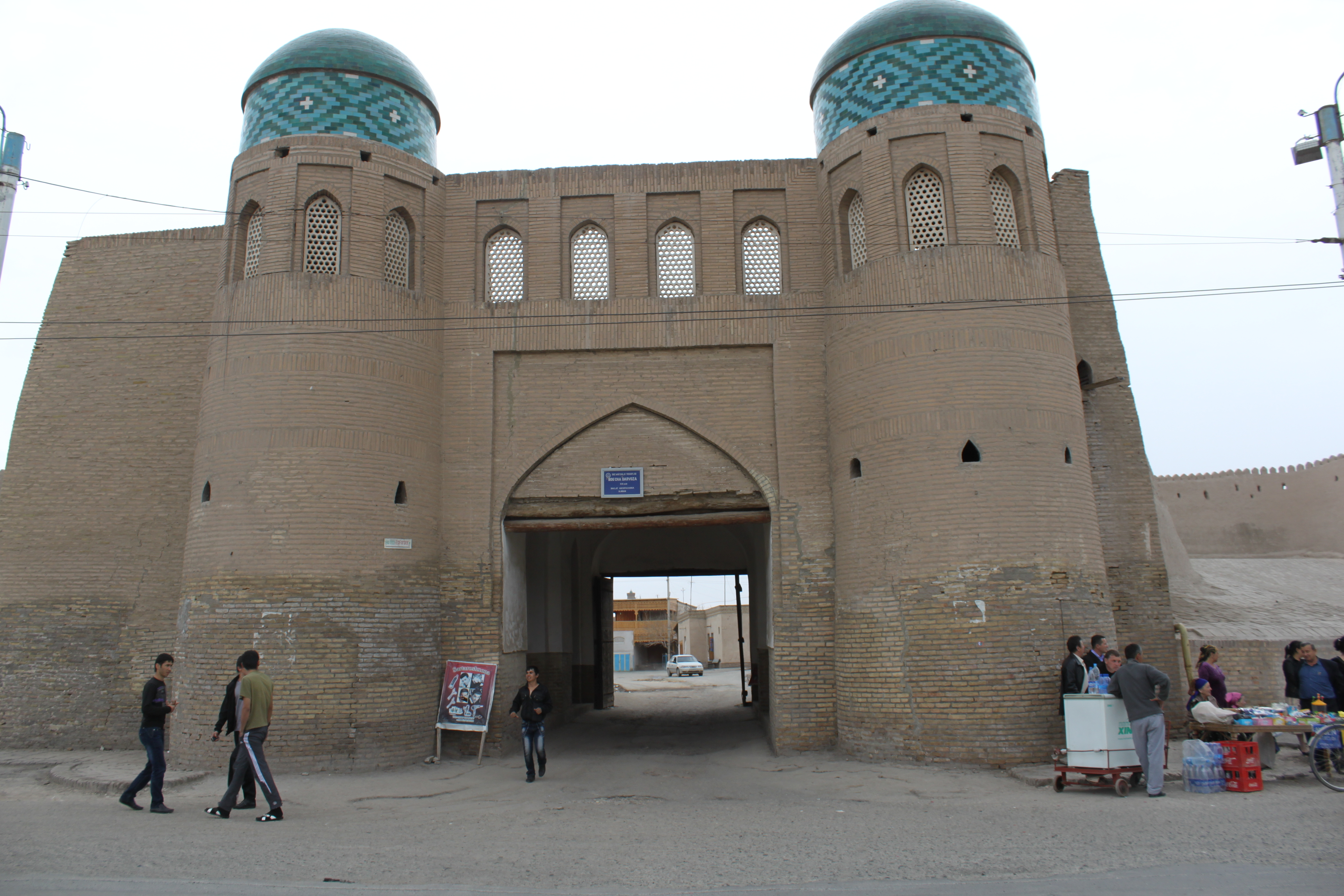
North Gate of Khiva

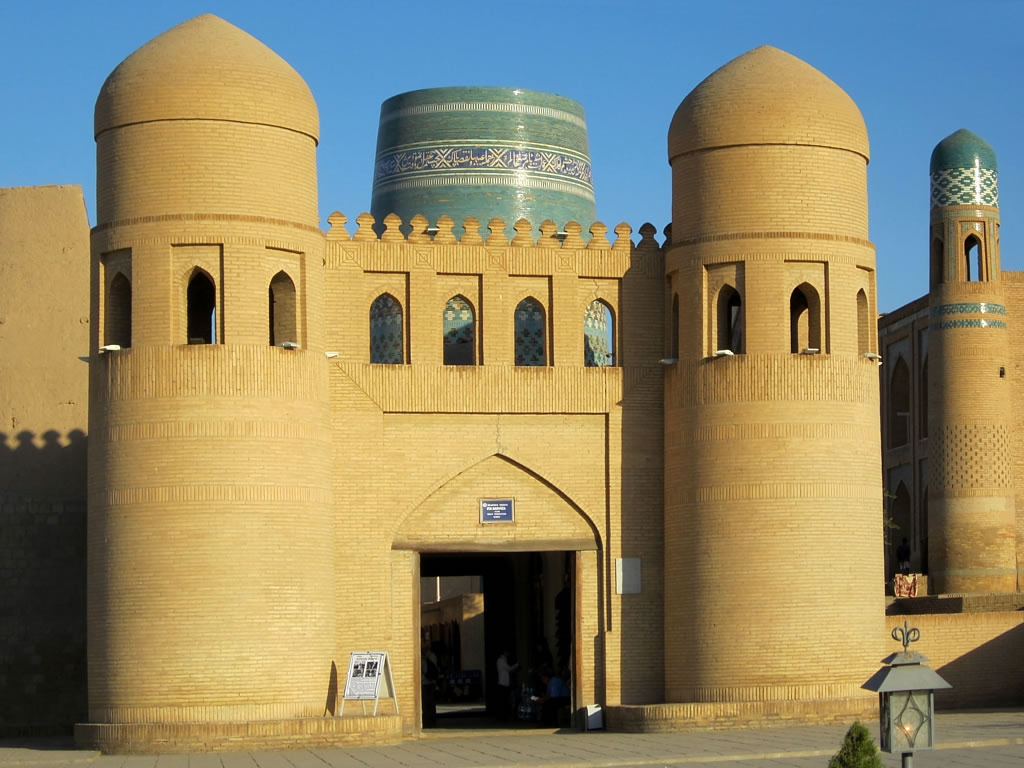
West Gate of Khiva

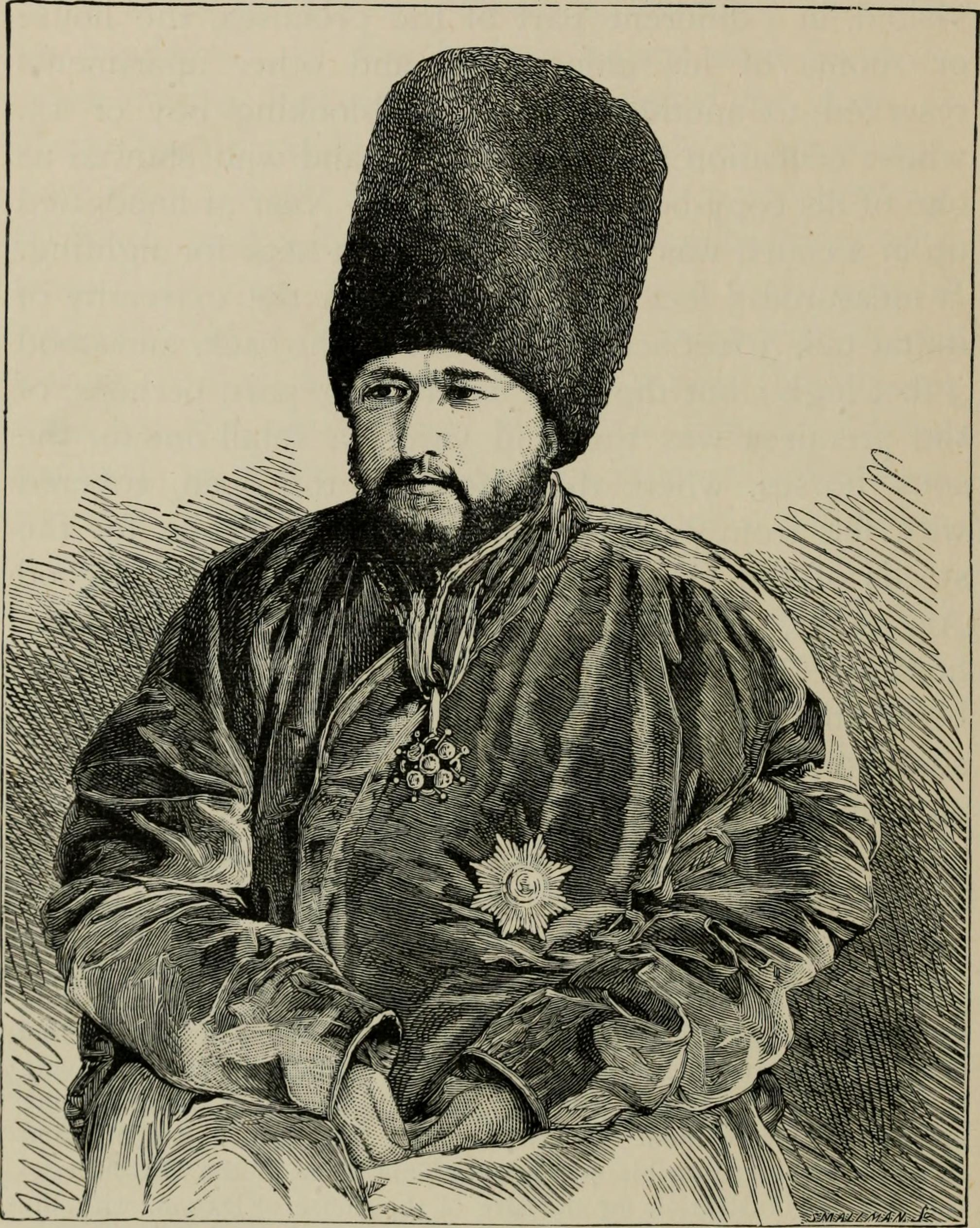
Muhamed Rahim Bogadur Khan, the Khan of Khiva

Veryovkin was at the northwest corner of the delta and Kaufmann at the south corner, but it was not until June 4 and 5 that messengers brought them into contact. Veryovkin took command of Lomakin's troops and left Kungard on May 27, taking Khojali (55 miles south) and Mangit (35 miles southeast of that). Because of some firing from the village, Mangit was burned and the inhabitants slaughtered. The Khivans made a number of attempts to stop them. By June 7 he was on the outskirts of Khiva. Two days before he had learned that Kaufmann had crossed the Oxus. On June 9 an advanced party came under heavy fire and found that they had unwittingly reached the North Gate of the city. They took a barricade and called for scaling ladders, but Veryovkin called them back, intending only a bombardment. During the engagement Veryovkin was wounded in the right eye. The bombardment began and an envoy arrived at 4 p.m. offering capitulation. Because firing from the walls did not stop the bombardment was resumed and soon parts of the city were on fire. Bombardment stopped again at 11 p.m. when a message arrived from Kaufmann saying that the Khan had surrendered. The next day some Turkmen began firing from the walls, the artillery opened up and a few lucky shots smashed the gate. Skobelev and 1,000 men rushed through and were near the Khan's place when they learned that Kaufmann was peacefully entering through the West Gate. He pulled back and waited for Kaufmann.

== Settlement ==
The Khan, who had fled Veryovkin's bombardment, was called back and reinstated on June 14. On August 24, after messages were exchanged with Saint Petersburg, a treaty was signed. The Khan renounced diplomatic or military operations without Russian consent, abolished the Khivan slave trade and slavery, opened the Khanate to Russian merchants and the Oxus to Russian boats, and agreed to an indemnity of 2,200,000 rubles which would be paid in instalments until 1893. The Russians placed a garrison at Petroalexandrovsk east of Khiva. In October a strip of Khivan territory was given to Bokhara as a reward for the Amir's neutrality. In March 1874 a Trans-Caspian military district was created with its headquarters at Krasnovodsk. Khiva remained a Russian protectorate until the revolution.

The Yomud campaign: While negotiating with the Khan, Kaufmann attacked the Yomud Turkomans who lived on the southwest side of the oasis. According to MacGahan, (Note: MacGahan seems to be the only source. He was an eye witness and gave a very vivid account, but some of his writing seems fictionalized and he made no attempt to explain Kaufmann’s motives.) Kaufmann demanded an impossibly large tax and when the Yomuds fled he sent soldiers after them with a great deal of unnecessary slaughter. After the Yomuds were ruined other Turkoman tribes agreed to a similar large tribute.

== See also ==
- Russian conquest of Central Asia
- Khivan slave trade

== =Bibliography ==
- J. A. MacGahan, Campaigning on the Oxus and the Fall of Khiva, 1874
- 'An Indian Officer', Russia's March towards India, 1894 (general account of the Russian conquest of Central Asia)
- notes
