= Mizdahkan =

Archeological complex in Karakalpakstan, Uzbekistan

Coordinates: 42°24′3.5″N 59°23′18.8″E

- Mizdaxqan, Миздахқан (Karakalpak); Mizdaxqon, Миздахқон (Uzbek)
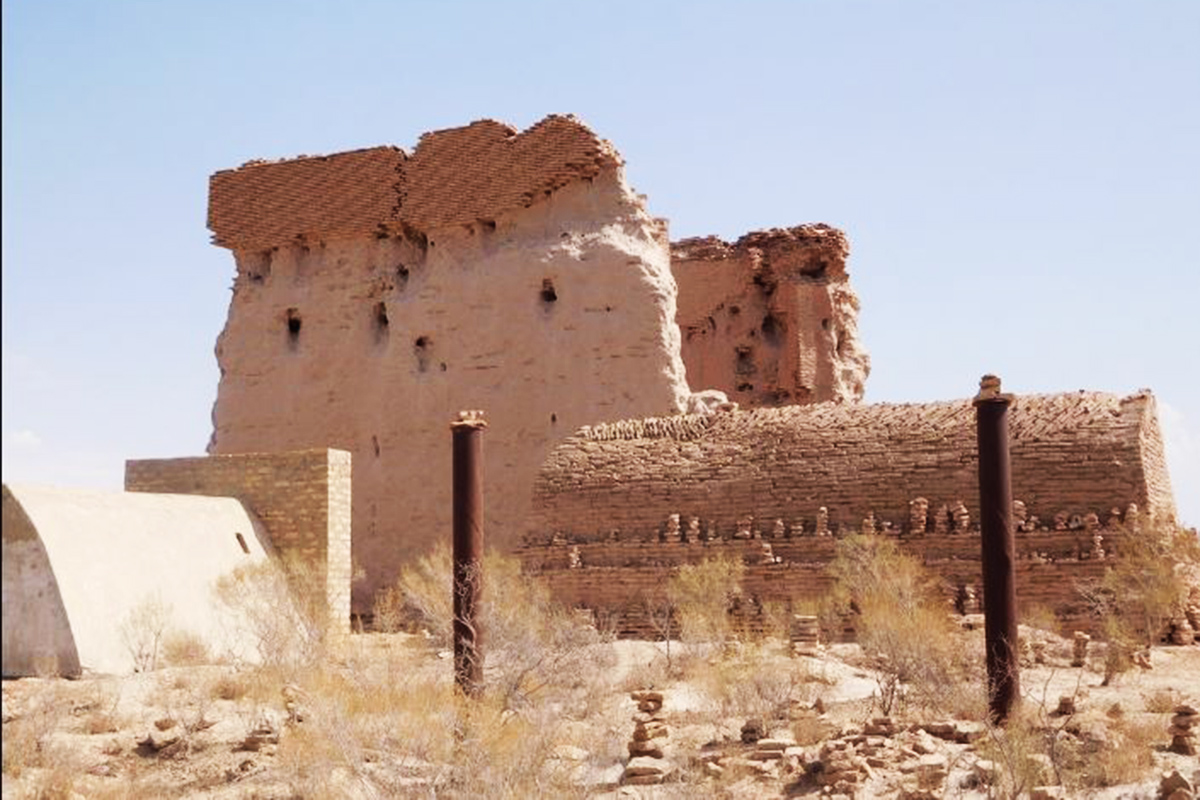
- Khalifa Erejep Mausoleum
- Interactive map of Mizdahkan
- Location: Xojeli district

History
- Built: Gyaur Kala fortress: As early as 4th century BC; Islamic Mausoleums: 9th-12th centuries

Mizdahkan (Note: Karakalpak: Mizdaxqan, Миздахқан [mɯzdaxqan]; Uzbek: Mizdaxqon, Миздахқон) is an archeological site and necropolis on the west of the city of Xojeli. It lies on hills within the Xojeli District, Karakalpakstan. It was founded in the 4th century BC, eventually becoming one of the largest cities of Khwarazm. Today, it consists of the Gyaur-Kala fortress, and a necropolis with Islamic Mausoleums. The hills closest to the city are still used as cemeteries for the deceased from Xojeli.

The fortress were beseiged several times, and controlling it was important for controlling the area in the delta of Amu Darya. The layout of the fortress is barely visible, with little portions of the walls still standing. Only the necropolis next to the fortress is somewhat preserved to this day, with reinforcement efforts led by the US Embassy in Uzbekistan, in 2024.

== History ==
There is likely to have been a settlement at Mizdahkan before, but the remnants of earliest structures at the Gyaur-Kala fortress suggest that they were built in the 4th century BC. A necropolis was built on the hill opposite the fortress. A local legend says it is the burial site of Adam, which may account for its sacred status in ancient times. In the medieval period, Zoroastrian and Islamic traditions entwined, as is evidenced by burial sites which have been excavated.

Its two fortresses were built in the 9th-12th centuries. The ossuary burial ground occupies the entire western half of the hill. The last burial in the necropolis dates back to the 14th century.

The Mongols under Genghis Khan massacred the Iranian inhabitants of the area and after a certain time, the complex was almost completely destroyed in 1338 during the Tamerlane expedition to Konye-Urgench. Mizdahkan thrived until the 14th century when Timur led three campaigns against Khorezm. He attacked Mizdahkan and reduced it to rubble, and after this the city was depopulated and used solely as a burial place. Most of the mausoleums and the small mosque which are visible today date from this period.

== Layout ==
=== Necropolis ===
The necropolis once was a Zoroastrian cemetery, later being used to bury people by Islamic traditions. Unlike Muslims, Zoroastrians didn’t bury their dead, but rather left the bodies to be consumed by birds of prey on top of a flat roofed tower called a dakhma. They then put the clean bones into ossuaries, a number of which have been discovered here.

In the legends, Keyumars (or Gayōmart), who was neither male nor female but was the first human on Earth (according to the Zoroastrian mythology), is related to this site. In Mizdahkan, there is an underground mausoleum of Princess Mazlum Khan Sulu. Also, according to the legends a brick falls from the structure every year, and when the last brick will have fallen, the world will end. In order to protect mankind from this event, pilgrims place additional bricks on the structure when they visit, ensuring it stays standing.

On the western edge of Mizdahkan the 11th-century tomb of Yusup Ishan and a number of other grand mausoleums dating from the medieval period. These are Muslim burial sites, and some of the mausoleums have beautiful decorative tiles.

=== Gyaur-Kala ===
The Gyaur-Kala Fortress is the southernmost part of Mizdahkan. There are remnants of a fortress with some walls and layout of structures visible inside. Within these fortified walls are the ruins of two important buildings, a fire temple and a palace.

The Fortress was studied by archeologists in the USSR, but the site has no barriers to entry today.

== Sources ==
- Mizdakhan Necropolis. Khorezm Tourist Attractions. (2022). Centralasia-travel.com. Retrieved 23 April 2022.
