= Yessengaly Raushanov =

Kazakhstani poet (1957–2021)

Esenğali Rauşanov
- Есенғали Раушанов
- Born: October 5, 1957; Khojeli, Karakalpak ASSR, Uzbek SSR, Soviet Union
- Died: April 16, 2021 (aged 63); Almaty, Kazakhstan
- Education: Al-Farabi Kazakh National University

Esenğali Äbdıjapparūly Rauşanov (Note: Often transliterated as Yessengaly Abdijapbarovich Raushanov through a Russified Romanization of Есенгали Абдижапбарович Раушанов.) (Kazakh: Есенғали Әбдіжаппарұлы Раушанов; October 5, 1957 – April 16, 2021) was a Kazakh poet.

== Life ==
After finishing high school in 1973, he served in the Soviet army, in the North Caucasus region (1975–1977). He studied at the Kazakh National University (KazMU), majoring in journalism. In 1978-1987 he ran the poetry department and held a position of an executive secretary of "Jalyn" and "Array" journals, in 1988-1995 served as a head editor for the "Bilym jane Ennbeck" ("Zerrde") journals. He was the laureate of the Prize of the "Kazakhstan Youth Union", and the "Alash" International Prize in literature. Also he was the laureate of the "Young poets and authors" Festival held in Moscow in 1989, and of the "Zhigerr" Festival of talented young people. He has been honoured with the Order of "Khurmet" and the Order of Merit for his contribution to the 10 year development of independent Kazakhstan.

He is the author of the poetry books called "Bastau" (19873), "Kelintobe" (1978), "Sholpan juldiz tuganshaa" (Until the Venus rise) (1984), "Gaisha Buby" (1989), "Khara bauyir Kaskaldakh" (2000), "Perishteler men Khustar" (The Angels and Birds) (2006), and the collected cognitive-poetical works called "Our friends – the birds" (2006, 2007, 2009), which has been republished 3 times and translated into Russian, Uzbek and Kyrgyz languages. He is respected as a poet of the nation; as a matter of fact the main subject of his works has always been the liberty of his nation. His poem "Khara bayir Khaskhaldakh" has become an anthem for the young Kazakhs, who have risen against the Russian chauvinism in 1986. In 2007 he was honoured with the Distinctive Poet Prize of the Republic of Kazakhstan Government.
