= Taqiyatas =

Taqiyatas Тақыятас, Taqiyatas
- City
- Taqiyatas
- Location in Uzbekistan
- Coordinates: 42°20′0″N 59°34′0″E
- Country: Uzbekistan
- Region: Karakalpakstan
- District: Taqiyatas district

Area
  - Total: 402 km^{2} (155 sq mi)

Population (2023)
  - Total: 76,100
- Time zone: UTC+5 (UZT)
  - Summer (DST): +5

Taqiyatas (Karakalpak: Тақыятас, Taqiyatas) is a city in Karakalpakstan in Uzbekistan. It is the seat of Taqiyatas district. In 2016, its population was 47,500.
