= Vasily Perovsky =

Russian general and statesman (1794–1857)

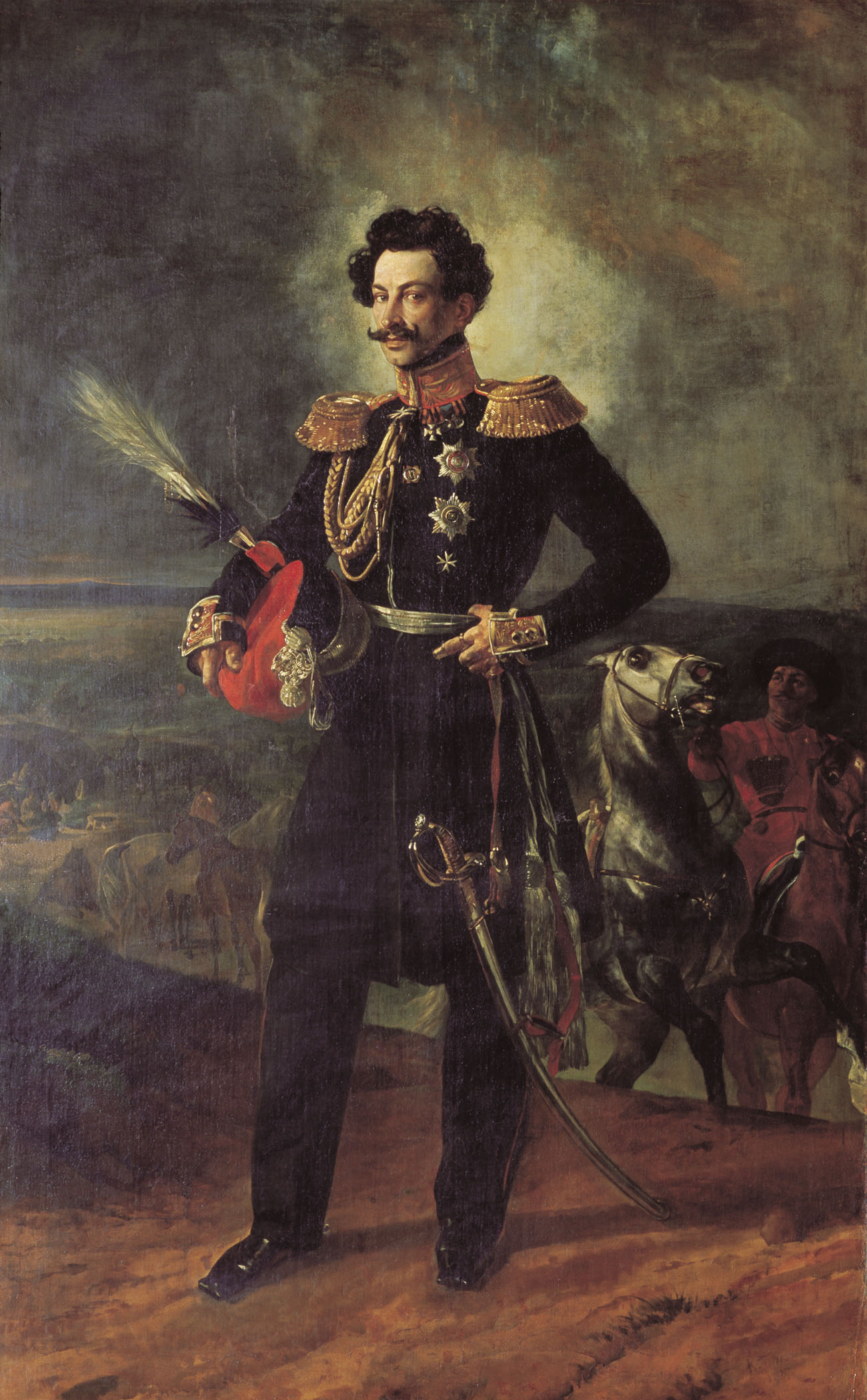
- General-adjutant Count V. A. Perovsky. Painting by Karl Briulov (1837)
- Born: February 9, 1795; Pochep, Novgorod-Seversky Viceroyalty, Russian Empire
- Died: December 8, 1857 Alupka, Taurida Governorate, Russian Empire
- Allegiance: Russian Empire
- Branch: Imperial Russian Army
- Service years: 1811-1857
- Rank: General of the cavalry
- Conflicts: Napoleonic Wars; French invasion of Russia; Battle of Borodino; Russo-Turkish War (1828-29); Siege of Varna; Russian conquest of Central Asia; Khivan campaign of 1839–1840; Russo–Kokand War; Siege of Ak-Mechet

Count Vasily Alekseevich Perovsky (Russian: Васи́лий Алексе́евич Перо́вский; 1794–1857) was Russian general and statesman.

== Biography ==
The illegitimate son of Count Alexey Razumovsky, who became Russia's Minister of National Education, Perovsky studied at Moscow University, then joined the retinue of Emperor Alexander I in 1811. As he retreated toward Moscow after the 1812 Battle of Borodino, the French took him prisoner and he remained in captivity until the fall of Paris in 1814.

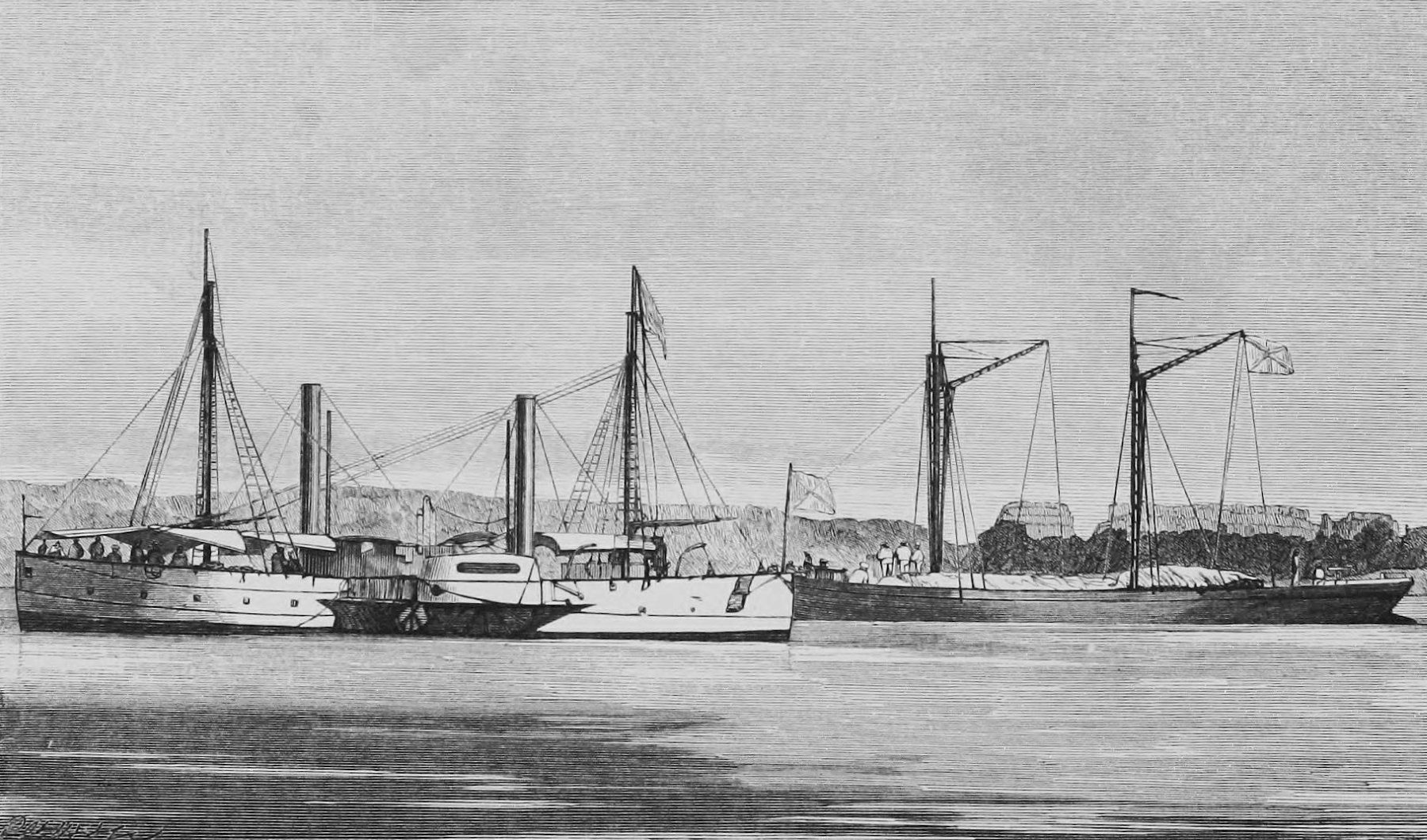
Perovsky's Aral Flotilla in the 1850s. One of the steamers was named after Perovsky himself.

Perovsky was involved in the Russo-Turkish War (1828–1829) and ended up being seriously wounded then. In 1833, Perovsky was appointed the military governor of Orenburg on the Russian Empire's southeastern frontier. In 1839 he led an invasion on the Khanate of Khiva – in part to free Russian slaves captured from the Russian frontiers on the Caspian Sea and sold by Turkmen raiders; but also as an attempt to extend Russia's borders in the direction of Central Asia while the British Empire was entangled in the First Anglo-Afghan War of 1839–1842. Perovsky's expeditionary force consisted of 5,200 infantry and 10,000 camels. Due to poor planning and bad luck, they set off southwards in November 1839 into one of the worst winters in living memory, and had to turn back in February 1840. The expeditionary force returned to Orenburg, Russia in May, having suffered over 1,000 casualties, mostly from cold and disease.

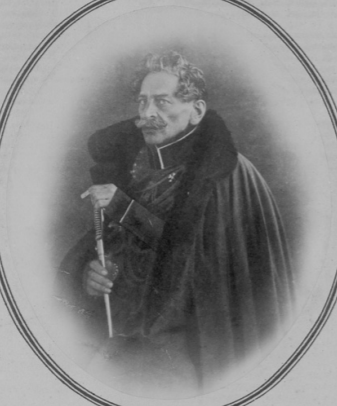
A portrait of Count Vasily Alekseevich Perovsky in the 1850s. His left forefinger, replaced with gold fillet, was lost in the Battle of Borodino.

In 1842 Perovsky left the Orenburg governor's position, but he returned to that office in 1851–1857. This time, his campaigning in central Asia (today's central Kazakhstan) against the Khanates of Khiva and Kokand proved much more successful. After his troops successfully took the Kokand fortress of Ak-Mechet in 1853, the fort was renamed Fort-Perovsky after him. His military successes forced the Khanate of Khiva to make concessions in its 1854 treaty with the Russian Empire.

For his achievements, Perovsky was made a count in 1855.
