= Khivan campaign of 1839–1840 =

Failed Russian invasion of the Khanate of Khiva

- Part of Russian conquest of Turkestan
Date	10 October 1839 – June 1840
Location	Khiva (present-day western Uzbekistan, southwestern Kazakhstan and much of Turkmenistan)
Result	Khivan-Kazakh victory: Russian invasion of Khiva repelled

Belligerents
Khiva; Junior jüz	(Russia) Russian Empire

Commanders and leaders
Allah Quli Bahadur; Makhambet Otemisuly	(Russia) Nicholas I (Russia) Vasily Perovsky

Strength
Unknown	6,651 troops

Casualties and losses
Unknown	2,500 killed or died of diseases

The Khivan campaign of 1839–1840 was a failed Russian attempt to conquer the Khanate of Khiva. Vasily Perovsky set out from Orenburg with 5,000 men, met an unusually cold winter, lost most of his camels, and was forced to turn back after going halfway.

Russians attacked Khiva four times. Around 1602, some free Cossacks made three raids on Khiva. In 1717, Alexander Bekovich-Cherkassky attacked Khiva and was soundly defeated, only a few men escaping to tell the tale. After the Russian defeat in 1839–1840, Khiva was finally conquered by the Russians during the Khivan campaign of 1873.

== Background ==
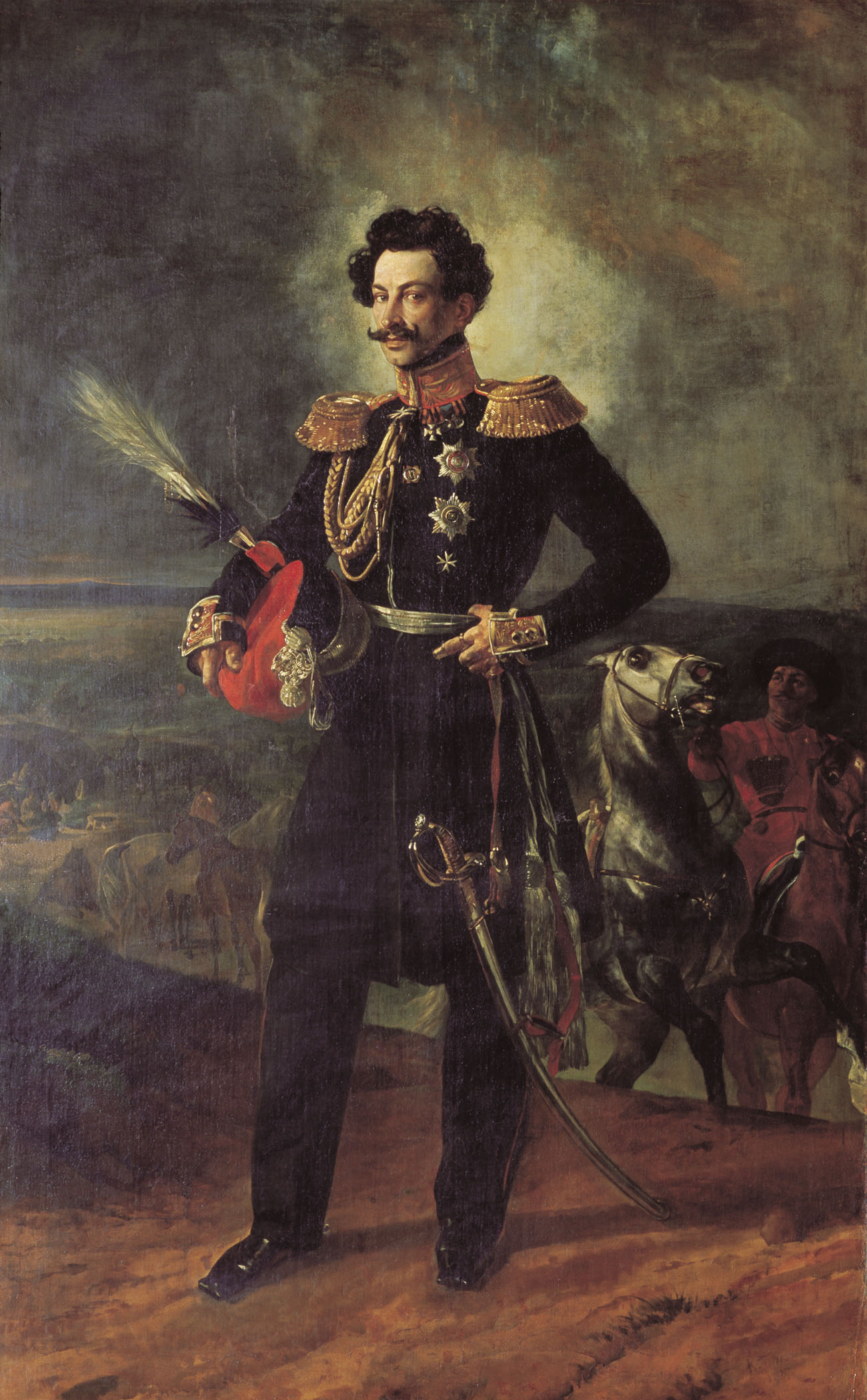
General-adjutant Count V. A. Perovsky. Painting by Karl Briulov (1837)

The Khanate of Khiva was situated south of the Aral Sea in the delta of the Oxus River. Here irrigation supported a population of about half a million. The problem was that Khiva was an oasis surrounded by several hundred miles of steppe and desert. The Russians could easily defeat the Khivan army but they first had to move enough troops across the hostile steppe.

By about 1743, Russia had established itself on the Orenburg Line about 750 miles north of Khiva. Orenburg was long the base from which Russia watched and tried to control the steppes to the east and south. Over the next century they gained increasing control over the Kazakh nomads. There were the usual border disputes on a lawless frontier. The Russians complained that the Khan did not do enough to stop raiders, although his ability to control them was limited.

A second problem was the Khivan slave trade. Khiva kept many Persian slaves which they bought from the Turkomans. A small number of Russians were also taken from the Orenburg Line. From the early nineteenth century an increasing number of Russian fishermen were captured on the Caspian Sea. After other attempts to pressure the Khan had failed, in August 1836, Russia ordered the arrest of all Khivan merchants in Russian territory – about 572 people and 1,400,000 silver rubles in goods. The Khan was told that his subjects would be released when all Russian slaves were released. In late September, Khan Allah Quli Bahadur said he would release his Russians, but when the caravan arrived there were only 25, almost all old men who had been in slavery for 30 or 40 years. Five more were released in 1838 and 80 more in August 1839. On 24 March 1839, the czar approved an attack on Khiva. The goal was not annexation but, if possible, to replace the current Khan with a Kazakh loyal to Russia. The final plan was approved on 10 October.

Khivan campaign of 1839
Locations of Fort Emba and Aq Bulaq are not exact

== Preparations ==
The land around Khiva has enough grass and water to support a thin nomadic population, but not enough for an army. The troops would have to carry nearly everything with them. As one moves south, grass and water diminish, as did Russian knowledge of the ground, an important matter for an army marching from one waterhole to the next. Since the grass died down in summer, spring and autumn were the best times for travel. Winter was sometimes preferred to reduce the need for water. Winter snow and cold are not too bad in normal years, but 1839 was not a normal year.

5,000 men would be used, 3,000 for the actual fighting and 2,000 to guard the supply line. Orenburg was chosen as the starting point, since this was the main base and had connections to the Russian heartland. Additional supplies would be taken by sea to Novo Alexandrovsk and carried east to the main column. 7,750 Bashkir carts were mobilized to haul supplies to Orenburg. 10,400 camels and 2,000 camel drivers were requisitioned from the Kazakhs. This required military force in the case of one tribe.

In June, Colonel Heke went south with two companies and 1200 carts to explore the route and establish advanced depots. He reached the Emba River on 30 June and sent a smaller group forward to establish the next depot. The Aq Bulaq River (Note: The locations of Fort Emba and Aq Bulaq are estimated from Yuri Bregel, An Historical Atlas of Central Asia, map 31 and a barely legible map on the last page of Anomymous. The Aq Bulaq River is one of the two springs (the other is Kok Bulaq) feeding the salty lake Shoshkakol (lake of the pigs) located 15 km north of the foot of the Ustyurt plateau (chink Dongystau, Mountain of the boar). The ruin of the pentagonal fort (330 x 380m) is visible on satellite image at the location: E57°50'53.52"-N47°02'21.50". The first Fort Emba was at the junction of the Emba and the Aty-Yakshi.) 100 miles south was chosen and a fort was built there in August. A large amount of hay was mown and reeds and willows were collected for fuel. For 40 kilometers north of Aq Bulaq, there were salt marshes with no adequate water or grass. By September, a fort had been built on the Emba and hay mown. Fort Emba had a garrison of 634 men and Aq Bulaq had 399. The forts were unhealthy and by December 93 men had died. On the first of November a caravan of 1,128 camels left Orenburg and reached the Emba 24 days later.

== Campaign ==
Some officers thought that it was too late in the season (Note: Articles Orenburg and Aral, Kazakhstan have climate tables for this part of the world.) but the campaign proceeded anyway. On 26 November, the first column left Orenburg. Three more columns left a day or two apart. The first snow fell on 2 December. On 18 December, the mercury in the thermometers congealed (minus 35 Fahrenheit). The first snow storm struck on the 19th. They reached the Emba on 31 December with no deaths but numerous cases of frostbite. In the previous 27 days the temperature never rose above 12 degrees Fahrenheit.

On 30 December 2,000 to 3,000 Khivans attacked Aq Bulaq. After 2 unsuccessful days they turned their attention to a supply column 17 kilometers away. When this also failed they withdrew. The Russians lost 5 killed and 13 wounded. Eighty Khivan bodies were counted. About this time, some of the Kazakh camel drivers staged a mutiny. After two ringleaders were shot, the rest returned to duty. (One writer says that the camel drivers knew the country and correctly guessed that the expedition would fail, something that Perovsky was forced to admit a month later, Also about this time, word was received from the Caspian. The supply ships had been delayed by contrary winds and had become frozen in, only two limping back to Astrakhan. Those frozen near Novo Alexandrovsk were unloaded. Those further away, were burnt by a group sent from Khiva. This group then attacked those Kazakhs who were working with the Russians, thereby cutting off the supply of fresh camels. In November, Aitov was sent to collect camels to haul supplies from the Caspian to Fort Emba. Returning with 538 camels his camel drivers revolted, returned the camels to their owners and sent Aitov to Khiva. By 13 January, there were 202 sick on the Emba and one fifth of the camels were too weak to be used.

In January, the columns began leaving Fort Emba, the main one reaching Aq Bulak on 6 February, covering about 100 miles in 16 days. The temperature was well below zero Fahrenheit. Men had to walk in front of the camels to clear a path through the snow. Between the Emba and Ak Bulaq, 1,200 camels died and about 2,500 had to be abandoned due to exhaustion. Unnecessary supplies were burnt for fuel. The cold made it impossible to wash or change clothes. In early February, Bizyanov was sent about 100 miles south and reported the snow was even deeper. Of the 2,750 Orenburg Infantry, who were not used to campaigning, only two thirds were fit for duty and 236 had died. Given the rate of loss of men and camels it was clear that if the army reached Khiva it would be in no condition to fight. On 13 February (Note: All dates in this article are New Style. Anonymous normally gives both Old Style and New Style dates. For this (page 156), he gives only 1 February. Comparison with other dates shows that was probably Old Style.) Perovsky decided to retreat.

All four columns were back on the Emba by the end of February. The temperature remained below zero Fahrenheit. Roots were dug up for fuel and supplies were burned for heat. Since all the grass around Fort Emba had been consumed and there were many dead camels that would begin to rot in spring, Fort Emba was moved to a new location about 30 kilometers away. Cossacks were sent out to obtain more camels. 500 were secured by negotiation. 700 were sent from Orenburg. Bizyanov attacked the Adaev tribe at mouth of the Emba, killed 450 men, and brought back a large number of camels. By mid-May, there were 3,480 camels. At this time, there were 1,130 men sick in camp, 613 with scurvy. The troops began leaving the Emba on 30 May, encountered nothing worse than mud and by late June were dispersed along the Orenburg Line.

== Results ==
1,054 Russians died out of the original 5000. Deaths of Kazakh camel drivers are not given. Bashkir carters lost 199 men and 8,869 horses. (Note: The author does not report Bashkirs south of Orenburg.) The expedition cost 1.7 million rubles. (Note: Possibly paper or non-silver assignat rubles, since the budget, was 425,000 silver rubles and 12,000 gold ducats.) Economic losses to the Bashkirs and Kazakhs were estimated at 2.5 million rubles each. (Note: Camels were requisitioned at 3 silver rubles each for 6 months. Anonymous does not report compensation for dead camels) Of the original 10,500 camels, only 1,500 remained alive by April. During the campaign, there were 3,124 cases of sickness, 608 of them mortal. (Note: This is a contradiction since there were not 400 battle deaths.) It was noted that the death rate for the Ural Cossacks was 1 in 200 and among the Orenburg Infantry 1 in 14, the difference being ascribed to habituation to steppe campaigning. The following year a British agent convinced the Khan to free 416 Russian slaves. The Khivan traders and their goods were released. Perovsky retained his command and in 1853 won the battle of Ak Mechet. Khiva was finally subjugated by the Khivan campaign of 1873.

== See also ==
- First Anglo-Afghan War

== Source ==
=== References ===
- Anonymous (1867). A Narrative of the Russian Military Expedition to Khiva under General Perofski in 1839. Calcutta: Superintendent Government Printing.
- Morrison, Alexander (2021). The Russian conquest of Central Asia: a study in imperial expansion, 1814-1914. Cambridge: Cambridge University Press. ISBN 978-1-107-03030-5.
