= List of cities of the Russian Empire in 1897 =

The following is a list of the largest cities (over 20,000 inhabitants) in the Russian Empire according to the 1897 Russian Imperial Census.

| City | Governorate | Population | Status (2015) |
|---|---|---|---|
| Arkhangelsk | Arkhangelsk Governorate | 20,882 | Northwestern Federal District, Russia |
| Astrakhan | Astrakhan Governorate | 112,880 | Southern Federal District, Russia |
| Balta | Podolia Governorate | 23,363 | Ukraine |
| Belgorod | Kursk Governorate | 26,564 | Central Federal District, Russia |
| Bendery | Bessarabia Governorate | 31,797 | Moldova |
| Bendin (Będzin) | Petrokov Governorate | 23,757 | Poland |
| Berdiansk | Taurida Governorate | 26,496 | Ukraine |
| Berdichev (Berdychiv) | Kiev Governorate | 53,351 | Ukraine |
| Akkerman (Bilhorod-Dnistrovskyi) | Bessarabia Governorate | 28,258 | Ukraine |
| Bobruisk | Minsk Governorate | 34,336 | Belarus |
| Bolkhov | Oryol Governorate | 21,446 | Central Federal District, Russia |
| Borisoglebsk | Voronezh Governorate | 22,309 | Central Federal District, Russia |
| Brest-Litovsk | Grodno Governorate | 46,568 | Belarus |
| Bryansk | Oryol Governorate | 24,781 | Central Federal District, Russia |
| Byelostok (Białystok) | Grodno Governorate | 66,032 | Poland |
| Cherkassy (Cherkasy) | Kiev Governorate | 29,600 | Ukraine |
| Chernigov (Chernihiv) | Chernigov Governorate | 27,716 | Ukraine |
| Chistopol | Kazan Governorate | 20,104 | Volga Federal District, Russia |
| Kronstadt | Saint Petersburg Governorate | 59,525 | Northwestern Federal District, Russia |
| Chestokhov (Częstochowa) | Petrokov Governorate | 45,045 | Poland |
| Yuryev (Tartu) | Governorate of Livonia | 42,308 | Estonia |
| Dvinsk (Daugavpils) | Vitebsk Governorate | 69,675 | Latvia |
| Yekaterinoslav (Dnipro) | Yekaterinoslav Governorate | 112,839 | Ukraine |
| Yelizavetgrad (Kropyvnytskyi) | Kherson Governorate | 61,488 | Ukraine |
| Feodosia | Taurida Governorate | 24,096 | Crimean Federal District, Russia / Ukraine |
| Gomel | Mogilev Governorate | 36,775 | Belarus |
| Grodno | Grodno Governorate | 46,919 | Belarus |
| Ivanovo-Voznesensk (Ivanovo) | Vladimir Governorate | 54,208 | Central Federal District, Russia |
| Izmail | Bessarabia Governorate | 22,295 | Ukraine |
| Kalish (Kalisz) | Kalisz Governorate | 24,418 | Poland |
| Kaluga | Kaluga Governorate | 49,513 | Central Federal District, Russia |
| Kamenets-Podolsk (Kamianets-Podilskyi) | Podolia Governorate | 35,934 | Ukraine |
| Kazan | Kazan Governorate | 129,959 | Volga Federal District, Russia |
| Kerch | Taurida Governorate | 33,347 | Crimean Federal District, Russia / Ukraine |
| Kharkov (Kharkiv) | Kharkov Governorate | 173,989 | Ukraine |
| Kherson | Kherson Governorate | 59,076 | Ukraine |
| Proskurov (Khmelnytskyi) | Volhynia Governorate | 22,855 | Ukraine |
| Keltsy (Kielce) | Kielce Governorate | 23,178 | Poland |
| Kiev (Kyiv) | Kiev Governorate | 247,723 | Ukraine |
| Kishineff (Chișinău) | Bessarabia | 108,483 | Moldova |
| Kolomna | Moscow Governorate | 20,277 | Central Federal District, Russia |
| Kostroma | Kostroma Governorate | 41,336 | Central Federal District, Russia |
| Kovno (Kaunas) | Kovno Governorate | 70,920 | Lithuania |
| Kozlov (Michurinsk) | Tambov Governorate | 40,297 | Central Federal District, Russia |
| Kremenchug (Kremenchuk) | Poltava Governorate | 63,007 | Ukraine |
| Kursk | Kursk Governorate | 75,721 | Central Federal District, Russia |
| Kuznetsk | Saratov Governorate | 20,473 | Volga Federal District, Russia |
| Libava (Liepāja) | Courland Governorate | 64,489 | Latvia |
| Lipetsk | Tambov Governorate | 20,254 | Central Federal District, Russia |
| Livny | Oryol Governorate | 20,448 | Central Federal District, Russia |
| Lodz (Łódź) | Petrokov Governorate | 314,020 | Poland |
| Lomzha (Łomża) | Łomża Governorate | 26,093 | Poland |
| Lugansk (Luhansk) | Yekaterinoslav Governorate | 20,404 | Southern Federal District, Russia / Ukraine |
| Lyublin (Lublin) | Lublin Governorate | 50,385 | Poland |
| Mariupol | Yekaterinoslav Governorate | 31,116 | Ukraine |
| Minsk | Minsk Governorate | 90,912 | Belarus |
| Mitava (Jelgava) | Courland Governorate | 35,131 | Latvia |
| Mogilev on Dnieper | Mogilev Governorate | 43,119 | Belarus |
| Mogilev on Dniester (Mohyliv-Podilskyi) | Podolia Governorate | 22,315 | Ukraine |
| Morshansk | Tambov Governorate | 26,458 | Central Federal District, Russia |
| Moscow | Moscow Governorate | 1,038,591 | Central Federal District, Russia |
| Nakhichevan-on-Don | Don Host Oblast | 28,427 | Southern Federal District, Russia |
| Nizhny-Novgorod | Nizhny Novgorod Governorate | 90,053 | Volga Federal District, Russia |
| Nikolayev (Mykolaiv) | Kherson Governorate | 92,012 | Ukraine |
| Veliky Novgorod | Novgorod Governorate | 25,736 | Northwestern Federal District, Russia |
| Novocherkassk | Don Host Oblast | 51,963 | Southern Federal District, Russia |
| Nezhin (Nizhyn) | Chernigov Governorate | 32,113 | Ukraine |
| Odessa (Odesa) | Kherson Governorate | 403,815 | Ukraine |
| Akhtyrka (Okhtyrka) | Kharkov Governorate | 23,399 | Ukraine |
| Oryol | Oryol Governorate | 69,735 | Central Federal District, Russia |
| Orenburg | Orenburg Governorate | 72,425 | Volga Federal District, Russia |
| Ostrogozhsk | Voronezh Governorate | 20,983 | Central Federal District, Russia |
| Pabianice | Petrokov Governorate | 26,765 | Poland |
| Penza | Penza Governorate | 59,981 | Volga Federal District, Russia |
| Perm | Perm Governorate | 45,205 | Volga Federal District, Russia |
| Pinsk | Minsk Governorate | 28,368 | Belarus |
| Petrokov (Piotrków) | Petrokov Governorate | 31,182 | Poland |
| Plotsk (Płock) | Plotsk Governorate | 26,966 | Poland |
| Polotsk | Vitebsk Governorate | 20,294 | Belarus |
| Poltava | Poltava Governorate | 53,703 | Ukraine |
| Pskov | Pskov Governorate | 30,478 | Northwestern Federal District, Russia |
| Radom | Radom Governorate | 29,896 | Poland |
| Reval (Tallinn) | Estonia Governorate | 64,572 | Estonia |
| Riga | Governorate of Livonia | 282,230 | Latvia |
| Romny | Poltava Governorate | 22,510 | Ukraine |
| Rovno (Rivne) | Volhynia Governorate | 24,573 | Ukraine |
| Rostov on Don | Don Host Oblast | 119,476 | Southern Federal District, Russia |
| Ryazan | Ryazan Governorate | 46,122 | Central Federal District, Russia |
| Rybinsk | Yaroslavl Governorate | 25,290 | Central Federal District, Russia |
| Rzhev | Tver Governorate | 21,265 | Central Federal District, Russia |
| Saint Petersburg | Saint Petersburg Governorate | 1,264,920 | Northwestern Federal District, Russia |
| Samara | Samara Governorate | 89,999 | Volga Federal District, Russia |
| Sarapul | Vyatka Governorate | 21,398 | Volga Federal District, Russia |
| Saratov | Saratov Governorate | 137,147 | Volga Federal District, Russia |
| Serpukhov | Moscow Governorate | 30,571 | Central Federal District, Russia |
| Sebastopol | Taurida Governorate | 53,595 | Crimean Federal District, Russia / Ukraine |
| Sedlets (Siedlce) | Siedlce Governorate | 26,234 | Poland |
| Simbirsk | Simbirsk Governorate | 41,684 | Volga Federal District, Russia |
| Simferopol | Taurida Governorate | 49,078 | Crimean Federal District, Russia / Ukraine |
| Smolensk | Smolensk Governorate | 46,699 | Central Federal District, Russia |
| Sumy | Kharkov Governorate | 27,564 | Ukraine |
| Suvalki (Suwałki) | Suwałki Governorate | 22,648 | Poland |
| Syzran | Simbirsk Governorate | 32,383 | Volga Federal District, Russia |
| Taganrog | Don Host Oblast | 51,437 | Southern Federal District, Russia |
| Tambov | Tambov Governorate | 48,015 | Central Federal District, Russia |
| Tiraspol | Kherson Governorate | 31,616 | Moldova |
| Tomashov (Tomaszów Mazowiecki) | Petrokov Governorate | 21,005 | Poland |
| Tsaritsyn (Volgograd) | Saratov Governorate | 55,186 | Southern Federal District, Russia |
| Tsarskoye Selo (Pushkin) | Saint Petersburg Governorate | 22,480 | Northwestern Federal District, Russia |
| Tula | Tula Governorate | 114,733 | Central Federal District, Russia |
| Tver | Tver Governorate | 53,544 | Central Federal District, Russia |
| Ufa | Ufa Governorate | 49,275 | Volga Federal District, Russia |
| Uman | Kiev Governorate | 31,016 | Ukraine |
| Vilna (Vilnius) | Vilna Governorate | 154,532 | Lithuania |
| Vinnytsia | Podolia Governorate | 30,563 | Ukraine |
| Vitebsk | Vitebsk Governorate | 65,871 | Belarus |
| Vladimir | Vladimir Oblast | 28,479 | Central Federal District, Russia |
| Vologda | Vologda Governorate | 27,705 | Northwestern Federal District, Russia |
| Volsk | Saratov Governorate | 27,058 | Volga Federal District, Russia |
| Voronezh | Voronezh Governorate | 80,599 | Central Federal District, Russia |
| Vyatka (Kirov) | Vyatka Governorate | 25,008 | Volga Federal District, Russia |
| Varshava (Warsaw, or Warszawa) | Warsaw Governorate | 683,692 | Poland |
| Vlotslavsk (Włocławek) | Warsaw Governorate | 22,907 | Poland |
| Yaroslavl | Yaroslavl Governorate | 71,616 | Central Federal District, Russia |
| Yeisk | Kuban Oblast | 35,446 | Southern Federal District, Russia |
| Yelets | Oryol Governorate | 46,956 | Central Federal District, Russia |
| Zhitomir (Zhytomyr) | Volhynian Governorate | 65,895 | Ukraine |
| Alexandropol (Gyumri) | Erivan Governorate | 30,616 | Armenia |
| Andijan | Fergana Oblast | 47,627 | Uzbekistan |
| Baku | Baku Governorate | 112,253 | Azerbaijan |
| Barnaul | Tomsk Governorate | 21,073 | Siberian Federal District, Russia |
| Batum (Batumi) | Kutais Governorate | 28,508 | Georgia |
| Blagoveshchensk | Amur Oblast | 32,834 | Far Eastern Federal District, Russia |
| Ekaterinburg | Perm Governorate | 43,239 | Ural Federal District, Russia |
| Yekaterinodar (Krasnodar) | Kuban Oblast | 65,697 | Southern Federal District, Russia |
| Yelisavetpol (Ganja) | Elizavetpol Governorate | 33,625 | Azerbaijan |
| Erivan (Yerevan) | Erivan Governorate | 29,006 | Armenia |
| Irbit | Perm Governorate | 20,062 | Ural Federal District, Russia |
| Irkutsk | Irkutsk Governorate | 51,484 | Siberian Federal District, Russia |
| Kars | Kars Oblast | 20,891 | Turkey |
| Khodzent (Khujand) | Samarkand Oblast | 30,076 | Tajikistan |
| Kokand | Fergana Oblast | 81,354 | Uzbekistan |
| Krasnoyarsk | Yeniseysk Governorate | 26,600 | Siberian Federal District, Russia |
| Kutais | Kutais Governorate | 32,492 | Georgia |
| Maikop | Kuban Oblast | 34,327 | Southern Federal District, Russia |
| Old Marghelan | Fergana Oblast | 36,490 | Uzbekistan |
| Namangan | Fergana Oblast | 61,906 | Uzbekistan |
| Nukha (Shaki) | Elizavetpol Governorate | 24,734 | Azerbaijan |
| Omsk | Akmolinsk Oblast | 37,470 | Siberian Federal District, Russia |
| Osh | Fergana Oblast | 34,157 | Kyrgyzstan |
| Samarkand | Samarkand Oblast | 54,900 | Uzbekistan |
| Semipalatinsk | Semipalatinsk Oblast | 26,353 | Kazakhstan |
| Shemakha (Shamakhi) | Baku Governorate | 20,007 | Azerbaijan |
| Shusha | Erivan Governorate | 25,881 | Azerbaijan |
| Stavropol | Stavropol Governorate | 41,621 | North Caucasian Federal District, Russia |
| Tashkent | Syr-Darya Oblast | 156,506 | Uzbekistan |
| Tiflis (Tbilisi) | Tiflis Governorate | 159,862 | Georgia |
| Tobolsk | Tobolsk Governorate | 20,425 | Ural Federal District, Russia |
| Tomsk | Tomsk Governorate | 52,430 | Siberian Federal District, Russia |
| Troitsk | Tobolsk Governorate | 23,299 | Ural Federal District, Russia |
| Tyumen | Tobolsk Governorate | 29,588 | Ural Federal District, Russia |
| Uralsk | Ural Oblast | 36,466 | Kazakhstan |
| Uratyube (Istaravshan) | Samarkand Oblast | 20,621 | Tajikistan |
| Vladikavkaz | Terek Oblast | 43,740 | North Caucasian Federal District, Russia |
| Vladivostok | Primorskaya Oblast | 28,896 | Far Eastern Federal District, Russia |
| Verny | Semirechye Oblast | 22,744 | Kazakhstan |
| Zlatoust | Ufa Governorate | 20,502 | Ural Federal District, Russia |
| Abo (Turku) | Abo-Byorneborg Governorate | 32,184 | Finland |
| Helsingfors (Helsinki) | Nyuland Governorate | 66,734 | Finland |
| Tammerfors (Tampere) | Tavastgus Governorate | 22,169 | Finland |
| Vyborg | Vyborg Governorate | 21,290 | Northwestern Federal District, Russia |

== See also ==
- History of Russia (1892–1917)
- List of cities of the Russian Empire in 1840 (in Russian)
- List of cities in the USSR in 1926 (in Russian)
- List of cities and towns in Russia in 2010
- List of renamed cities and towns in Russia
