= Military Governor (Russia) =

The Military Governor (Russian: Военный губернатор) was the highest government and military official in a Governorate or Oblast, who was also the commander of troops in his area in the Russian Empire until 1917.

== History ==
The appointment of military commanders to administrative positions, while maintaining their military duties began in the 16th century. Voivods were appointed to Ukrainian cities with military administrative authority.

The name of the Military Governor appeared only in 1801, when, following the accession to the throne of Emperor Alexander I, the Military Governors were appointed in five border provinces (Kiev Governorate, Podolian Governorate, Lithuania Governorate-General, Little Russia Governorate and Belarusian Governorate).

== General provisions ==
The Military Governor was appointed to govern a province, region, city, or fortress, and in wartime to administer an area occupied by war law. In the area under his jurisdiction, he performed both civil and military administration. The post of military governor did not consider any advisory institutions.

The Military Governor was appointed and dismissed by the Highest Orders and Decrees of the Governing Senate on the proposal of the Minister of War by prior agreement with the Minister of the Interior.

The Military Governors were appointed to control the regions, most of which were part of the Governorate-Generals and which were located on the border edges of the Russian Empire. Such as: Kutais Governorate, Dagestan Oblast and Kars Oblast in the Caucasus Krai; The Primorskaya Oblast, the Amur Oblast and the Trans-Baikal Oblast in the Priamursk Governorate-General; Akmolinsk Oblast, Semipalatinsk Oblast and Semirechye Oblast in the Governor-Generalship of the Steppes; Syr-Darya Oblast, Fergana Oblast and Samarkand Oblast in the Russian Turkestan. The Ural Oblast and the Turgay Oblast were governed by the Military Governors, but were not part of the Governorate-Generals; the heads of the Transcaspian Oblast and Sakhalin also have the rights of the Military Governor. The commander-in-chief of the Kronstadt port is simultaneously considered the Military Governor of the city of Kronstadt. This also includes various areas of the Cossack troops — the Trans-Baikal, Ural, Primorskaya and Amur Oblasts, where the heads of the region were the atamans of the Cossack host.

== Authority ==
The Military Governor concentrates both civil and military control of the region. In civil administration, the Military Governor, in the performance of his duties, is guided by a provision common to the governors.

In wartime, all Military Governors are subordinate to the commander-in-chief of the army, if the territory entrusted to their control enters the area occupied by the army. In cases of military land units, the Military Governors are subordinate to the commander of the Military district.

The troops and personnel of the directorate, located on the territory under the control of the Military Governor, are subordinate to him as the head of the division.

Military Governors have the right to inspect troops and military establishments in the area. The Military Governor does not interfere in the internal control and the economy of the troops if the field troops located in the regions, which have their direct command, depend on the Military Governors only for the performance of local service.

The Governors-general and military governors during their stay in the capital are present in the Senate, in its general meeting and in the departments of the provinces entrusted to them.

== List of Military Governorates ==
- Akmolinsk Oblast;
- Amur Oblast;
- Vladivostok Military Governorship;
- Dagestan Oblast;
- Transbaikal Oblast;
- Transcaspian Oblast;
- Kars Oblast;
- Kamchatka Oblast;
- Kutais Governorate;
- Nikolaev Military Governorship;
- Nikolaev and Sevastopol Military Governorship;
- Orenburg Governorate;
- Primorskaya Oblast;
- Samarkand Oblast;
- Semipalatinsk Oblast;
- Semirechye Oblast;
- Syr-Darya Oblast;
- Sakhalin;
- Turgay Oblast;
- Ural Oblast;
- Fergana Oblast.

== Sources ==
- Military Governor // Encyclopedic Dictionary of Brockhaus and Efron: in 86 volumes (82 volumes and 4 additional). — St. Petersburg, 1890-1907
- Military Governor (Encyclopedia of Military and Marine Sciences)
- Military Governor (Sytin's Military Encyclopedia)
- Military Governor (Military Lexicon Encyclopedia)
- Gryzlov, Boris (2003). Gubernias of the Russian Empire. History and leaders. 1708–1917. Moscow: Joint Editorial Office of the Ministry of Internal Affairs of Russia. pp. 350, 384. ISBN 5-8129-0071-X.
- Lysenko, Lyubov (2001). Governors and governors-generals of the Russian Empire (XVIII - early XX century). Moscow: MPGU. p. 358. ISBN 5-7042-0972-6.
