= Siege of Ura-Tyube =

1866 engagement of the Russo-Bukharan War

- Part of the Russian conquest of Central Asia
- The Russian plan of siege and assault
Date	27 September – 2 October 1866
Location	Ura-Tyube, Emirate of Bukhara (modern Istaravshan)
Result	Russian victory

Belligerents
Russian Empire	Ura-Tyube

Commanders and leaders
(Russian Empire) Dmitry Romanovsky; (Russian Empire) Nikolai Kryzhanovskiy	Rustam Bek

Strength
approx. 4,000	Unknown

Casualties and losses
17 killed; 210 wounded	approx. 2,000 killed

The Siege of Ura-Tyube (27 September–2 October 1866) was part of an unapproved Russian military operation during the Russian conquest of Bukhara and Russo-Kokand War. The operation was led by Military Governor Dmitry Romanovsky and aimed to capture several settlements on the Russo-Bukharan border including Ura-Tyube. Ura-Tyube had declared independence from the Emirate of Bukhara several months before the siege, and sent horsemen to harass Romanovsky's forces, stationed in Khujand after its capture. In response, Romanovsky led a detachment to Ura-Tyube with plans of capturing it. The Russian assault on the fort was extremely successful, in part due to unexpectedly effective artillery breaches.

== Background ==
Positions of the settlements (Note: The location of Irjar is based on a map from the Military Encyclopedia of Sytin)

Similar to the neighboring Khujand, the city of Ura-Tyube broke free from their ruling power shortly before the Russian attack. Ura-Tyube was a part of the Emirate of Bukhara, but from 1865 to 1866 governor Rustam Bek, and First Minister 'Abd al-Ghafar Bek successfully broke away from Bukhara, establishing an independent fiefdom.

In the mid-1800s, Russia conquered territory in Central Asia to establish a secure, productive border with the Central Asian states to the south. While this territory was secured by 1865, in 1866 war reignited with the neighboring Bukhara after they detained the Russian embassy. Military Governor of Orenburg Dmitry Romanovsky was given tacit permission to attack the Bukharan fort of Irjar, resulting in a crushing defeat for the Bukharans. Romanovsky was subsequently faced with the choice of which direction to continue his attack. He could either continue into Bukhara via Ura-Tyube, Jizzakh and Samarkand, or capture the frontier cities on the Syr Darya river via Khujand. While the Syr Darya route was believed by Russian command to be an easier attack, it would almost certainly destabilize the Russo-Bukharan border. Romanovsky chose the Syr Darya route despite this concern, and in a letter to General Governor of Orenburg Nikolay Kryzhanovsky downplayed any negative consequences. He would then proceed along the route without Kryzhanovsky's authorization.

In May Romanovsky would capture Nau and Khujand, though these territories were frequently harassed by parties of horsemen led by Rustam Bek from Ura-Tyube. These attacks combined with other factors increased Romanovsky's paranoia, with him preparing for hostilities up to a preemptive attack. He would execute this plan several months later, as on September 20 he would lead a detachment to Ura-Tyube.

== Siege ==
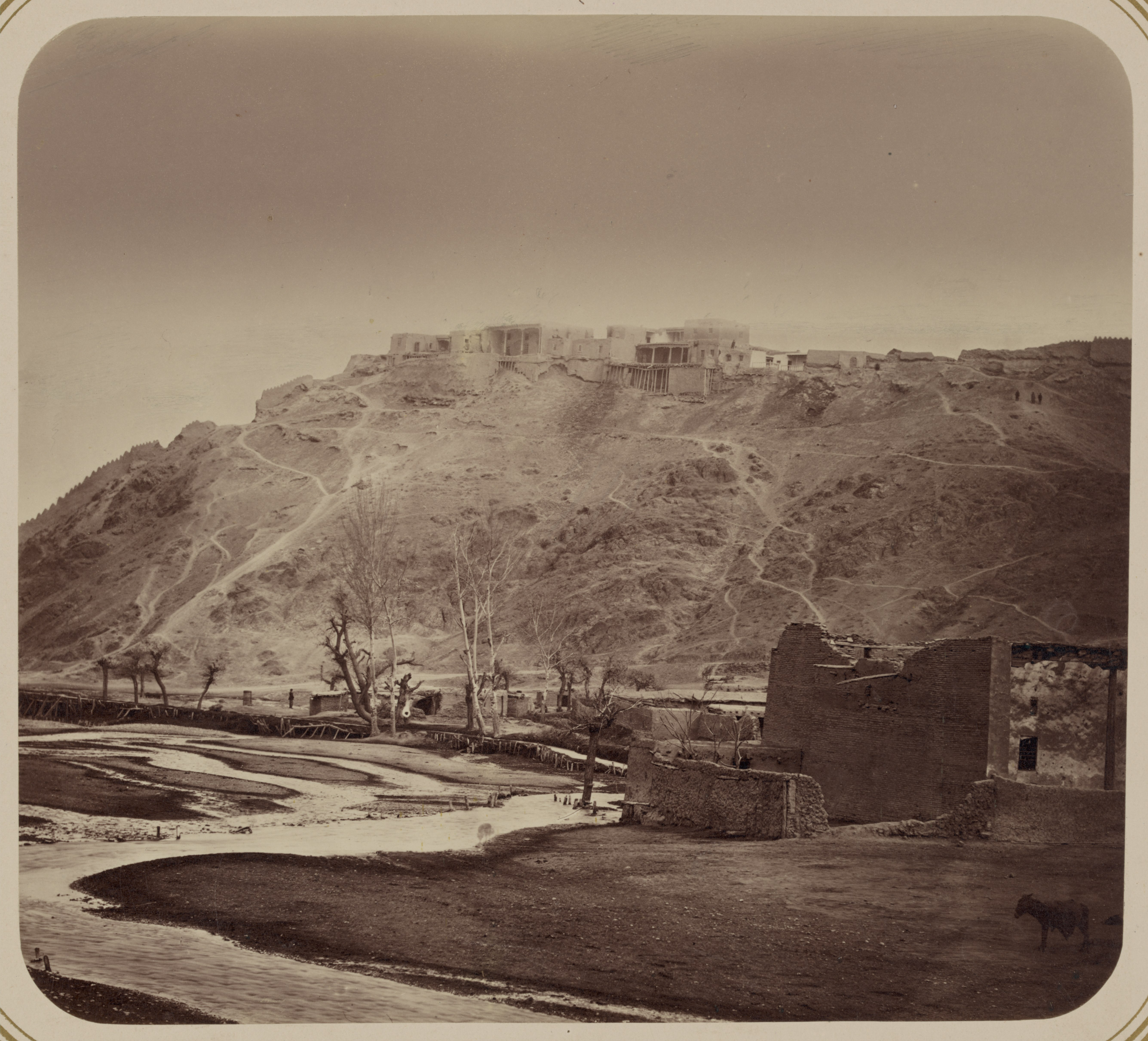
Ura-Tyube's citadel

Ura-Tyube was built on three steep hills, protected by two layers of clay walls approximately 6 versts (4.0 miles) in circumference. In previous Russian sieges of Central Asian forts, this type of wall had proved to be unreachable by Russian artillery. However, several artillerymen believed that Ura-Tyube would prove an exception, and so a two pronged attack was planned. Three columns each of two companies were formed, two would storm the southern walls via assault ladders and one would advance through the northeastern wall, which was to be breached via artillery.

At 5:00 a.m., the signal to attack was given, and the first two columns advances. The first column quickly established ladders on the southern wall, with five soldiers and one officer making it up before the ladder broke, leaving them surrounded by enemy forces. Russian troops hoping to relieve the stranded men assaulted the gates, breaking into the fortress before scaling the walls. The second company attacked at the same time, quickly spanning the esplanade under covering fire. When Russian troops attempted to scale the walls, defenders threw hot tar, logs, and stones. Upon successfully ascending the walls, heavy combat broke out while the Russians attempted to seize the towers. The artillery barrage of the third column proved successful, by midday a hole 2 meters (6.6 ft) wide and 1 fathom (6.0 ft) tall had been blown in the wall. The third column would advance into the city, partially through the breaches and partially by scaling the walls.

== Aftermath ==
The unexpected success of artillery breaches during the siege, and failure of scaling ladders changed how Russian commanders in Central Asia viewed the two forms of assault. Due to the profound failures of scaling ladders observed during the battle, general Konstantin Petrovich von Kaufmann ordered that the army's sapper company undertake experiments to test scaling ladders on clay walls.
