= Oblasts of the Russian Empire =

Administrative unit in the Russian Empire

- Russian Empire in 1914
- Category: Subdivision of an empire
- Location: Russian Empire
- Created: 1849
- Abolished: 1917 (inherited by the Soviet regime)
- Number: 35
- Subdivisions: uyezds (counties)

Oblasts in the Russian Empire were considered to be administrative units and were included as parts of Governorates General or krais. The majority of then-existing oblasts were located on the periphery of the country (e.g. Kars Oblast or Transcaspian Oblast) or covered the areas where Cossacks lived.

== List ==
- Amur Oblast
- Armenian Oblast
- Batum Oblast
- Belostok Oblast
- Bessarabia Oblast
- Don Voisko Oblast
- Dagestan Oblast
- Zabaikalskaya Oblast
- Imeretinskaya Oblast ^{ru}
- Caucasian
- Kamchatka Oblast
- Kars Oblast
- Caspian Oblast (1840-1846) ^{ru}
- Kvantunskaya Oblast
- Kuban Oblast
- Orenburg Kirgiz
- Omsk Oblast
- Primorskaya Oblast
- Sakhalin
- Taurida Oblast (1783-1796), annexation of the Crimean Khanate
- Tarnopolsky
- Terek Oblast
- Turgay Oblast
- Ural Oblast
- Yakutsk Oblast

Oblasts of Stepnoy Krai

- Akmolinsk Oblast
- Siberia Kirgiz
- Semipalatinsk Oblast

Oblasts of Turkestan Krai

- Transcaspian Oblast
- Samarkand Oblast
- Syr-Darya Oblast
- Turkestan Oblast
- Fergana Oblast
- Semirechye Oblast

== See also ==
- Oblasts of the Soviet Union
- Oblasts of Russia
- Voblasts of Belarus
