= Turkestan Album =

Turkestan Album (Turkestanskii Al’bom or Tуркестанский альбом) is a unique publication dedicated to the history, ethnography, geography, economy and culture of Central Asia before 1917, which contains over 1,200 rare photographs. The album was released in 1872 by order of the first Governor-General of Russian Turkestan, Konstantin Petrovich Von Kaufman, and is designed to acquaint Russian and western researchers with Turkestan region. At present, a complete set of volumes and parts of the book is stored only in the National Library of Uzbekistan, the Russian State Library and the Library of Congress.

== History ==
Konstantin Petrovich Von Kaufman (1818-1882), the first governor general of Russian Turkestan, commissioned the albums to acquaint Russians and Westerners with the region. The Russian orientalist A.L. Kun (also spelled Kuhn) compiled the first three parts, and the albums were formerly referred to as the Kun Collection. The other compilers included M.T. Brodovskii, M.A. Terentyev, N.V. Bogaevskii and photographer N.N. Nekhoroshev. The Military-Topographic Department, Military District of Tashkent printed the lithographic parts of each plate. The production work was primarily done in St. Petersburg and Tashkent in 1871-72.

This work is the “Archaeological Part” of the Turkestan Album, which contains a detailed visual record of the Islamic architecture of Samarkand as it appeared shortly after the Russian conquest in the 1860s. The mid-to-late 19th century was when the Russian Empire expanded into Central Asia, annexing territories located in present-day Uzbekistan, Kazakhstan, Turkmenistan, Tajikistan, and Kyrgyzstan. Russian armies occupied Tashkent in 1865 and Samarkand in 1868. Tsar Alexander II approved the establishment of the governor-generalship of Russian Turkestan in 1867. General Konstantin Petrovich von Kaufman (1818–82), the first governor-general, commissioned Turkestan Album, a visual survey of Central Asia that includes some 1,200 photographs, along with architectural plans, watercolor drawings, and maps.

Physically, each large green leather-bound volume is 45 cm × 60 cm (17.5 in × 23.5 in) following a printed title page, textual introduction, and list of captions, the visual plates appear with lithographically printed running headings, decorative borders, and individual captions in Russian. Each plate contains from one to eight gold-toned albumen photographic prints, with occasional watercolor drawings, architectural plans, and battle maps.

== Parts ==
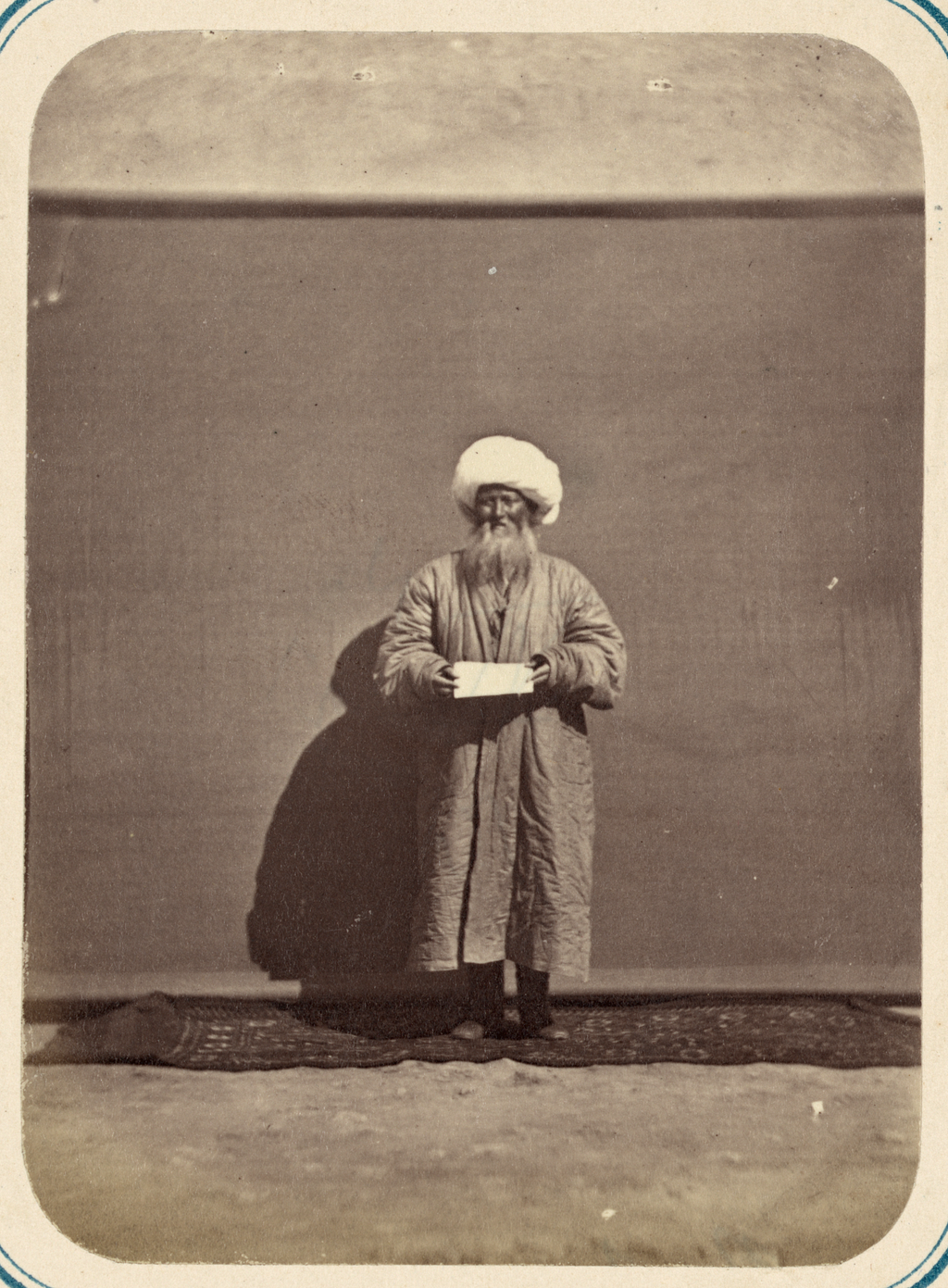
Image from "Ethnographic Part or Chast' Etnograficheskaia", Court of Judges. Reporter on Litigation

The work is in four parts, spanning six large, leather-bound volumes:

1. Archaeological Part or Chast' Arkheologicheskaia" (2 volumes)
  This part features views of Islamic architecture, chiefly in Samarkand.
2. Ethnographic Part or Chast' Etnograficheskaia" (2 volumes)
  This part features individual portraits and daily life scenes of Uzbeks, Tadzhiks, Kazakhs, Kirghiz, and others.
3. Trades Part or Chast' Promyslovaia" (1 volume)
  This part features occupations as textile production, mining, and baking of the people
4. Historical Part or Chast' Istoricheskaia" (1 volume)
  This part features on Russian military activities with battle maps and portraits of soldiers involved between 1853 and 1871.

The compiler of the first three parts was Russian Orientalist A.L. Kun, who was assisted by N.V. Bogaevskii. Production of the album was completed in 1871–72. The Library of Congress acquired a complete set of the volumes in 1934; other surviving copies are in the National Library of Uzbekistan and the National Library of Russia.
