= Oyina =

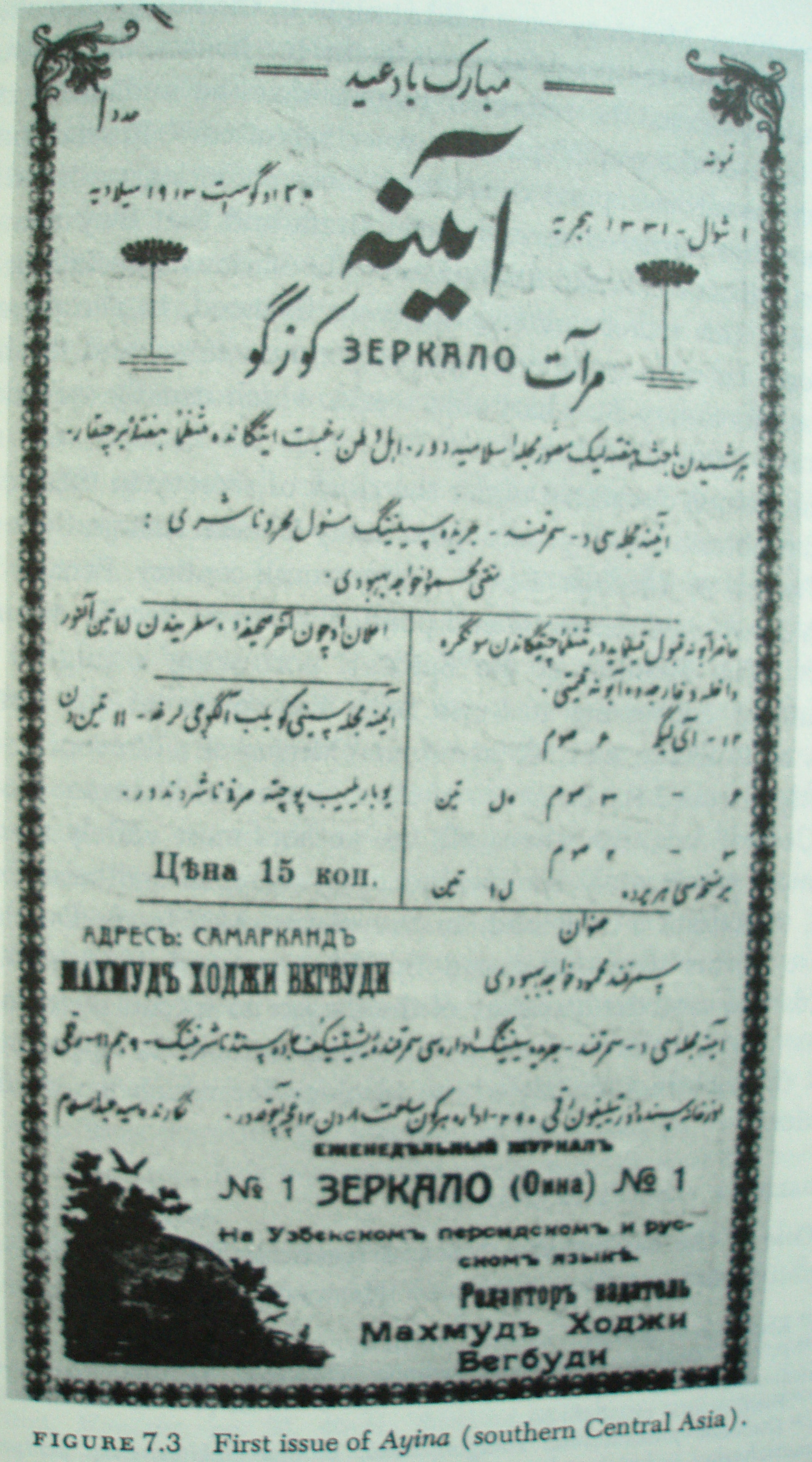
First issue of Oyina, 1913

Oyina (Persian: آینه, 'The Mirror') was a bilingual Turki-Persian newspaper published from Samarkand, Russian Turkestan 1913–1915. The newspaper was published by Mahmudkhodja Behbudiy. It functioned as an organ of the Jadid social reform movement.

== History ==
Mahmudkhodja Behbudiy was a wealthy philanthropist and social reformer in Samarkand. Out of nine pre-revolutionary newspapers in Turkestan were all short-lived and struggled with finances, Oyina was arguably the most successful. The newspaper was launched in August 1913. The newspaper played a significant role in spreading Enlightenment ideas. It was the most important periodical of the Jadid movement in Turkestan. In the pages of Oyina "the development of national education, language, and literature, in order to overcome the feudal-patriarchal backwardness of their peoples and to facilitate their liberation from colonial oppression". In articles in Oyina Mahmudkhodja Behbudiy would attack religious impurity, sinning, pederasty and alcohol consumption, and would call for the development of a new generation of educated Islamic clergy.

Whilst the newspaper was bilingual, different languages were assigned different roles. About two-thirds of the articles (such as news reporting, articles on science and editorials) were written in Turki. The remaining third of the article (essays and texts on philosophical issues) were written in Persian. Moreover, some advertisements in the newspaper were in Russian language.

Hoji Muin served as temporary editor of Oyina around 1914–1915. Many texts by Hoji Muin appeared in the pages of Oyina.

Oyina was published more or less weekly for a period of twenty months. Oyina closed down in June 1915 after 68 issues. The publication struggled with its finances. The economic difficulties of publishing in the midst of World War I further exacerbated this situation. By the end of its first year of publishing Oyina had merely 234 paid subscribers.
