= Turkestan Oblast (Russian Empire) =

1865–1867 oblast of the Russian Empire

- Oblast of Russian Empire
- Capital: Tashkent
- History
  - Established: 24 February [O.S. 12 February] 1865
  - Disestablished: 23 July [O.S. 11 July] 1867
Preceded by	Succeeded by
Khanate of Kokand	Turkestan Governorate-General

Turkestan Oblast (Russian: Туркеста́нская о́бласть, romanized: Turkestanskaya oblast) was an administrative-territorial unit of the Russian Empire in Central Asia, part of the Orenburg Governorate-General. It was established in 1865 with its administrative center in Tashkent. In 1867, the oblast was abolished, and its territory was incorporated into the newly formed Turkestan Governorate-General.

== History ==
The Turkestan Oblast was formed by a decree of Emperor Alexander II on 24 February [O.S. 12 February] 1865, by merging the Syr-Darya and Novokokandskaya (New Kokand) fortified lines. The oblast included conquered parts of the Khanate of Kokand and was part of the Orenburg Governorate-General. Its administration was under the control of the Ministry of War and regulated by the "Provisional Regulation on the Administration of the Turkestan Oblast" of 18 August [O.S. 6 August] 1865. The oblast was divided into a Center, a Left Flank, and a Right Flank, each with its own civil and military administration, and was headed by a military governor. For the first time in Central Asia, a system of military-people's administration was introduced. Local residents were governed by managers, while primary administration was carried out by officials from the local population. The oblast preserved the traditional people's court system, based on Sharia for the settled population and Adat for the nomadic population, although the Sharia court was subject to some restrictions.

Its first military governor (1865–1866) was Major General Mikhail Grigoryevich Chernyayev. With a detachment of 1,800 men and 12 cannons, he advanced on Tashkent and defeated the Kokand forces outside its walls on May 9. The residents of Tashkent had placed themselves under the authority of the Emir of Bukhara, who had sent his troops there. Deciding to preempt the Bukharans, Chernyayev stormed the city, and at dawn on June 15, he captured Tashkent with a swift attack. The capture of Tashkent firmly consolidated Russia's position in Central Asia.

In 1866, the newly captured territories of Tashkent, Khujand, and the Zachirchiksky Krai (the interfluve of the Chirchiq and Akhangaran rivers) were annexed to the Turkestan Oblast.

In 1866, Major General Dmitry Ilyich Romanovsky was appointed military governor.

The future organization of the region was discussed in a "Special Committee," which developed a project to establish two oblasts and form them into a special governorate-general (the project was approved by Emperor Alexander II on 11 April 1867). According to the project, the new oblasts were to be named Tashkentskaya and Almatinskaya, with centers in Tashkent and the fortress of Verny (which was to be renamed Almatinsk). A new city, Aleksandrograd, was to be founded near Aulie-Ata as the residence for the governor-general. However, this decision was revised—it was deemed more convenient to name the western Syr-Darya Oblast and the eastern Semirechye Oblast, to forgo the construction of a new city, and to allow the governor-general to choose his own residence.

A nominal decree from Alexander II to the Senate on 23 July [O.S. 11 July] 1867, ordered the "Establishment of the Turkestan Governorate-General, comprising the Turkestan Oblast, the Tashkent district, the lands captured in 1866 beyond the Syr Darya, and the part of the Semipalatinsk Oblast located south of the Tarbagatai ridge. According to this decree, the Turkestan Oblast was abolished, and its territory was incorporated into the Turkestan Governorate-General.
