= Siege of Khujand =

1866 siege during the Russian conquest of Central Asia

- Part of the Russian conquest of Central Asia
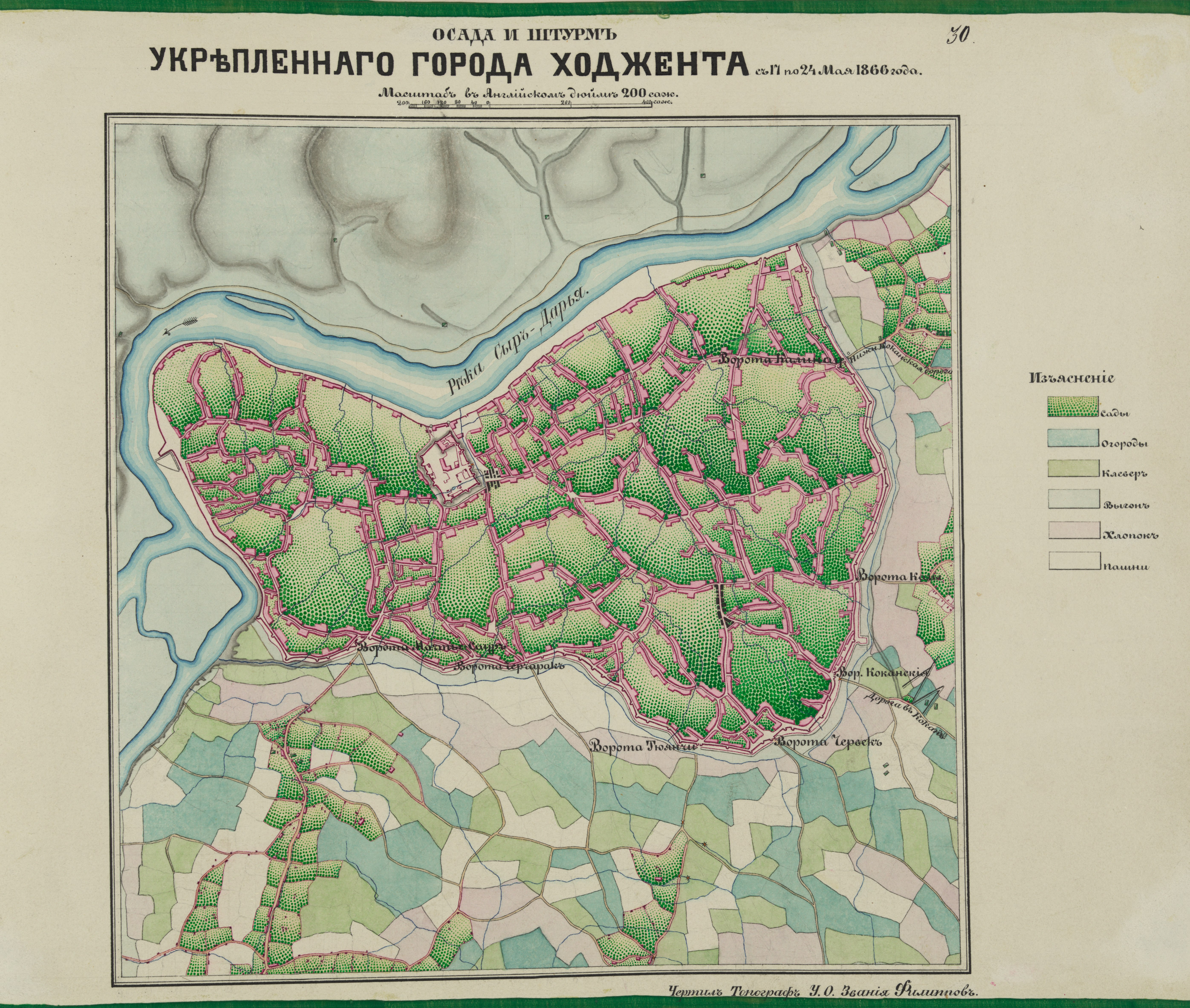
- The Russian plan of siege and assault
| Date | 17–24 May 1866 |
| Location | Khujand |
| Result | Russian victory |

Belligerents
| Russian Empire | Khujand |

Commanders and leaders
| (Russian Empire) Dmitry Romanovsky | Kereuchei Mullah Tuichi Dadkhwah † |

Casualties and losses
| 5 killed (Note: While Morrison and Mamadaliev both rely on the same letter written by Romanovsky for casualties, they come to different results. Mamadaliev claims only 57 Russian soldiers were contused, while Morrison reports 65. Additionally, the 5 killed and 65 wounded that Mamadaliev claims adds to one less than the 71 total killed and wounded reported by Morrison.); 65 wounded; 57–65 contused; 6 missing | approx. over 2,500 killed |

The siege of Khujand (17–24 May 1866) was part of an unapproved Russian military operation during the Russian conquest of Bukhara and Russo-Kokand War. The operation was led by Military Governor Dmitry Romanovsky and aimed to capture several settlements on the Russo-Bukharan border including Khujand. Khujand was a historically autonomous city, and had asserted independence from the Emirate of Bukhara several months before the siege. After the city was sieged and bombarded, a faction within Khujand began to negotiate for peace with Russian forces, though they were soon imprisoned by city leaders. Russian high command subsequently prepared to take the city via assault. After several more days of bombardment, a final assault began on 24 May. Despite strong initial resistance, Russian forces were able to enter the city from multiple routes. Active fighting had ended by midnight, and a formal surrender was delivered on 5 June. While Russian forces suffered minimal casualties, an estimated 2,500 Khujandis were killed in the fighting.

== Background ==
Positions of the settlements with present-day borders (Note: The location of Irjar is based on a map from the Military Encyclopedia of Sytin)

The city of Khujand was historically contested between the Khanate of Kokand and the Emirate of Bukhara (two Islamic states located in Central Asia). In practice, the city held extreme autonomy from both states, hosting both independent powers of governance, and a corresponding local identity and patriotism. In 1865 it was seized by Bukhara after Kokand's defeat at Tashkent to the Russian Empire, but only a year later Khujand would assert full independence after the fall of Irjar to Russian forces. The city operated an independent garrison under the command of Kereuchei Mullah Tuichi Dadkhwah. By the time of the Russian attack on Khujand, it was still an independent polity.

In the mid-1800s, Russia conquered territory in Central Asia to establish a secure, productive border region with the Central Asian states to the south. While this territory was secured by 1865, in 1866 war reignited with the neighboring Bukhara after several disputes including the detaining of the Russian embassy. Military Governor of Orenburg Dmitry Romanovsky was given tacit permission to attack the Bukharan fort of Irjar, resulting in a crushing defeat for the Bukharans. Romanovsky was subsequently faced with the choice of which direction to continue his attack. He could either continue into Bukhara via Ura-Tyube, Jizzakh and Samarkand, or capture the frontier cities on the Syr Darya river via Khujand. While the Syr Darya route was believed by Russian command to be an easier attack, it would almost certainly destabilize the Russo-Bukharan border. Romanovsky chose the Syr Darya route despite this concern, and in a letter to General Governor of Orenburg Nikolay Kryzhanovsky downplayed any negative consequences. He would then proceed along the route without Kryzhanovsky's authorization. On 14 May 1866, Russian troops departed and captured Nau fortress, which Romanovsky considered highly strategic due to its placement on the main road between Kokand and Bukhara. On 17 May, Russian forces would depart Nau, soon arriving at Khujand.

== Siege ==
=== Reconnaissance ===
Russian forces stopped 3.3 miles (5.3 km) from the city on the bank of the Syr Darya river. Reconnaissance was carried out on the fort, revealing that it would be extremely difficult to take. Structures and trees outside the fortress walls had been destroyed to reduce cover, and the main road to the city had been flooded by irrigation canals. The city itself was protected by two layers of wall, reinforced with towers, embankments, and barbettes. As a result, Russian forces decided to attempt diplomacy before any offensive measures were taken. However, Russian envoys were shot at when they attempted to approach the city, and plans for diplomatic resolution were abandoned.

After arriving at Khujand, Romanovsky received a letter from Kryzhanovsky, reprimanding him for requesting materiel for the expedition. Due to a recent order to regional quartermasters, funds were strictly prohibited from being spent without being specifically allocated beforehand. Since Romanovsky had not designated funds for the expedition, no further money or resources could be provided to his expedition. Romanovsky's aide-de-camp, who had remained in Tashkent, was forced to borrow 3,000 rubles from a wealthy Tashkenti to fund the last transport to Khujand.

Russian forces conducted a second reconnaissance expedition on 18 May, one column approaching the city on the left bank of the Syr Darya, and another column approaching from the right. The columns were fired upon by Khujand forces with artillery and small arms, though they were still able to successfully identify a weak section in the north-eastern walls, and encircle the city. While Russian sources claim that during this time Kokandi military parties were approaching the city and agitating local villagers, historian Inomjon Mamadaliev has cast doubt on this due to the deep hostilities between Kokand and Khujand.

=== Bombardment ===
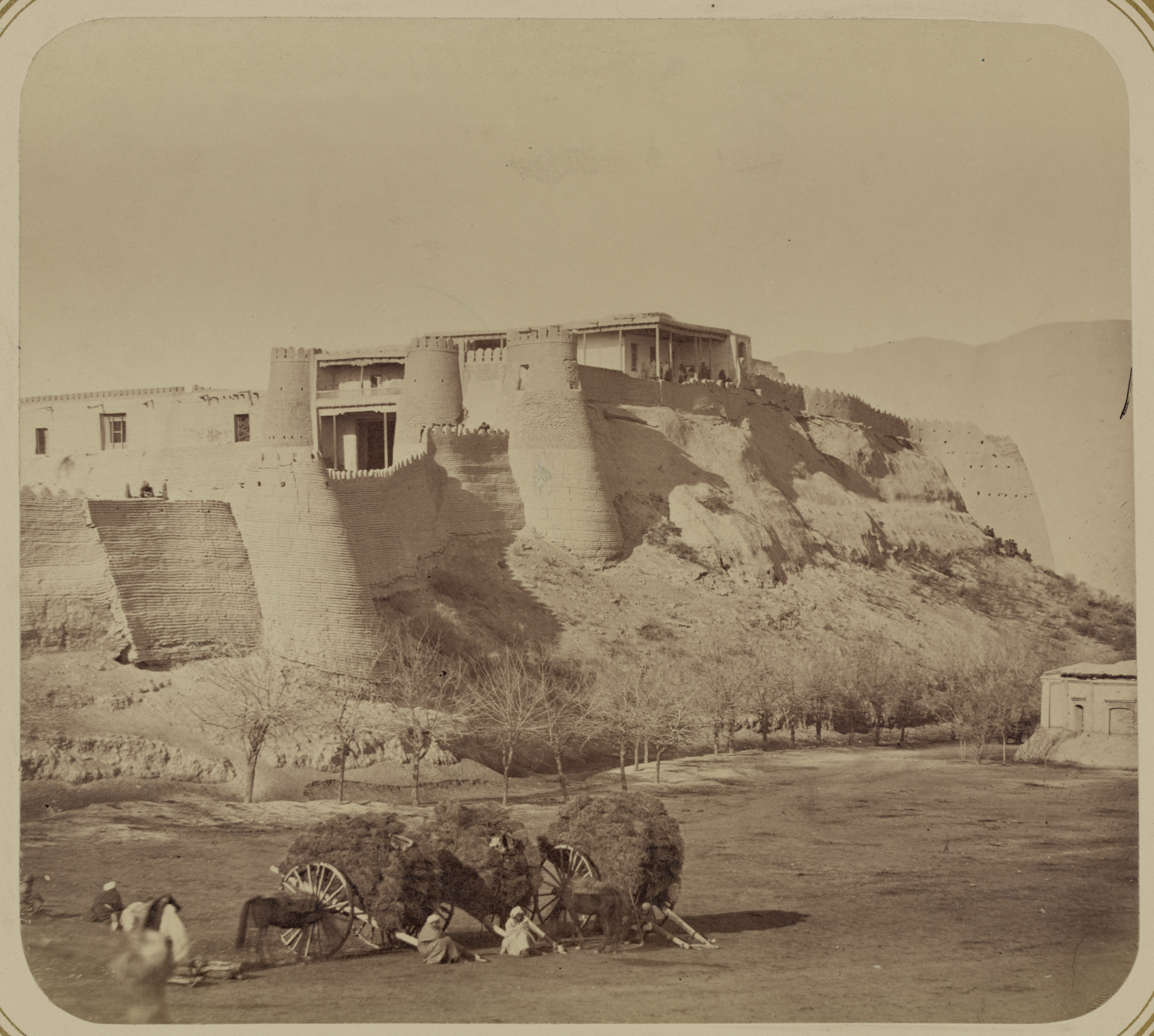
Citadel in Khujand

During the nights of 19 and 20 May, Russian forces constructed four batteries consisting of eighteen cannons and two mortars. These batteries then bombarded the city for a day straight, causing general turmoil. Several isolated fires also broke out, but did not spread. As a result of the attack, Khujandis split into two factions, a more powerful one led by the two chief jurists and the influential figure Khwaja 'Azamat who supported negotiation, and a weaker faction led by the aqsaqal (elders) who supported violent resistance.

On 21 May at 3:00 a.m., Russian forces began an assault on the city, but were stopped outside the walls by a Khujandi delegation led by 'Azamat. 'Azamat promised Romanovsky that the city would peacefully surrender, before he returned to the city. Upon returning to Khujand, he and the chief jurists were arrested by the aqsaqal, and no attempt for peace was made. At noon the following day, the deadline for a formal surrender expired. Romanovsky subsequently ordered a heavy artillery bombardment which lasted until 24 May.

Because the halted assault had revealed Russian plans, a diversionary attack was launched on the southern side of the city on 23 May. This drew defenders away from where the true attack was to be launched, and allowed Russian forces to fully cut off road access into the city.

=== Assault ===
For the final assault on 24 May, troops were split into three columns, two under Rotmistr Baranov and Kapitan Mikhailov containing two infantry companies and four artillery pieces, and one under Major Nazarov containing two infantry companies and one hundred Cossack cavalry serving as a support reserve. At dawn, the three columns managed to advance through surrounding gardens to their assigned positions without alerting Khujandi defenders. Captain Mikhailov's column was able to construct a battery 900 feet (270 m) away from the gate, which partially demolished the walls. At 2:00 p.m. the artillery barrage ended. Soon after Mikhailov gave a battle cry, signaling the start of the assault.

Mikhailov's column advanced through a breach in the north-eastern wall, Baranov's column attacked the north-eastern Qala-yinau and Kokand gates, and Nazarov's column hid in a mosque near the Qala-yinau gate. A company in Mikhailov's column attempted to scale the walls with three siege ladders, though were repulsed when defenders began to shoot and throw stones at the attackers. The construction of the siege ladders also hindered the attack. All three were overly short and narrow, one being so short it was unable to hook onto the walls. During the assault, Mikhailov sustained a severe head injury, and he would surrender command to Captain Bergbaum. After dispersing defenders with a barrage of grapeshot, the column successfully scaled and occupied the north-eastern wall, before descending into the city. Baranov's column met similar resistance, but were able to successfully scale the walls and occupy the Qala-yinau gate. Upon opening the gate, the rest of Baranov's column followed by Nazarov's column, a reserve force of Cossack cavalry, and the remaining infantry under Romanovsky entered the city and marched to the citadel. Soon after, a force under Colonel Kraevsky sailed a barge to the city's riverine wall, and scaled into the city.

Khujandi forces continued to fight, establishing artillery barricades in the streets and sniping at Russian soldiers from buildings. By 7:00 p.m., fighting had significantly lessened, and by midnight the city was silent. Many Khujandis attempted to flee the city on horseback, though a significant portion were killed or wounded by soldiers Romanovsky had ordered to guard the roads.

== Aftermath ==
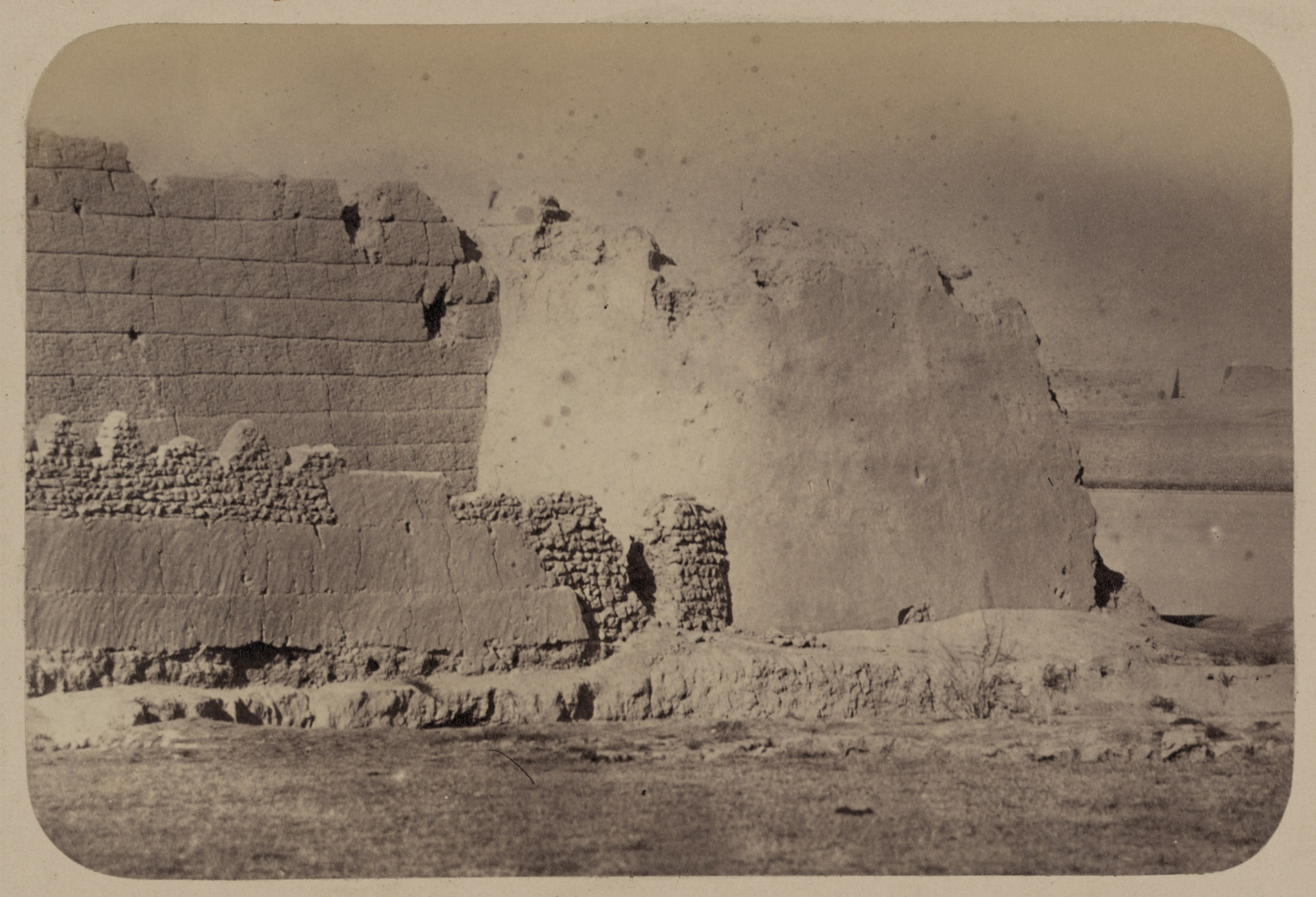
Destroyed walls subject to attack by Mikhailov's artillery

By the end of the fighting, Russian casualties were 5 killed, 65 wounded, 57 to 65 contused, and 6 missing. Romanovsky estimated the total Khujandi deaths to be over 2,500, including garrison commander Kereuchei Mullah Tuichi Dadkhwah, who Romanovsky said was killed while fleeing the city. Russian forces began to bury the Khujandi dead, and provide rudimentary treatment for the wounded over several days. On June 5, defenders would formally surrender by presenting a traditional Khujandi offering of bread and salt to Russian command.

Soon after the capture of Khujand, a delegation representing the Emir of Bukhara Muzaffar bin Nasrullah would meet with Romanovsky to discuss terms of surrender. Romanovky declined this offer, as he considered the leader of the delegation to be an untrustworthy individual. Romanovsky would continue his march to the Bukharan cities of Jizzakh and Ura-Tyube. While he had expected to impress the Russian government with the unapproved expedition similarly to Mikhail Chernyayev's capture of Tashkent, the Ministry of Foreign Affairs did not view the action positively.

The captures of fort Nau and Khujand during Romanovsky's expedition intimidated the Kokand Khanate, which viewed Khujand as part of their state. On 28 May, Khudayar Khan delivered a letter to Romanovsky in which he declared himself a friend of the Tsar, wished for goodwill, and indicated openness to an alliance against Bukhara. Romanovsky responded positively to the letter, and responded by demanding extradition rights and free trade for Russian merchants.
