= Uzbek Soviet Socialist Republic =

Constituent republic of the Soviet Union

Coordinates: 40.0°N 66.0°E

Uzbek Soviet Socialist Republic: Ўзбекистон Совет Социалистик Республикаси (Uzbek); Узбекская Советская Социалистическая Республика (Russian) (Note: See § Names for historical names)
- 1924–1991
- Flag (1952–1991) State emblem (1978–1991)
- Motto: Бутун дунё пролетарлари, бирлашингиз! (Uzbek); Butun dunyo proletarlari, birlashingiz! (transliteration) "Proletarians of all nations, unite!"
- Anthem: Ўзбекистон Совет Социалистик Республикаси мадҳияси Oʻzbekiston Sovet Sotsialist Respublikasining davlat madhiyasi; "Anthem of the Uzbek Soviet Socialist Republic"
- Uzbekistan (red) within the Soviet Union
- Status: 1924–1990: Union republic of the Soviet Union; 1990–1991: Union Republic with priority of the Uzbek legislation September–December 1991: De facto independent state
- Capital: Bukhara (1925); Samarkand (1925–1930); Tashkent (1930–1991)
- Common languages: Official languages: Uzbek; Russian; Minority languages: Bukhori; Karakalpak; Kazakh; Koryo-mar; Kyrgyz; Parya; Pashto; Persian; Tajik; Tatar; Turkmen
- Religion: State atheism (official); Sunni Islam (majority)
- Demonym: Uzbek • Soviet
- Government: Soviet republic (1924–1990) Presidential republic (1990–1991)
- First Secretary
  - 1925–1927 (first): Vladimir Ivanov
  - 1989–1991 (last): Islam Karimov
- Head of government
  - 1924–1937 (first): Fayzulla Xoʻjayev
  - 1990 (last): Shukrullo Mirsaidov
- Legislature: Supreme Soviet
- History
  - Succeeds Turkestan ASSR: 27 October 1924
  - Republic proclaimed: 5 December 1924
  - Accession of Karakalpakstan: 5 December 1936
  - State sovereignty declared: 20 June 1990
  - Renamed into the Republic of Uzbekistan/Independence: 31 August 1991
  - Independence recognized: 25 December 1991

Area
  - Total: 447,400 km^{2} (172,700 sq mi)

Population
  - 1989 census: 19,905,158 (3rd) (4th)
- GDP (PPP): 1991 estimate
  - Per capita: $2,980.7
- GDP (nominal): 1991 estimate
  - Total: $18.2 billion
  - Per capita: $658
- HDI (1977): 0.798 high
- Currency: Soviet rouble (Rbl) (SUR)
- Calling code: +7 36/37/436
- ISO 3166 code: UZ
Preceded by
Bukharan SSR
Khorezm SSR
Turkestan ASSR
Succeeded by
1929: Tajik SSR
1991: Republic of Uzbekistan
- Today part of: Uzbekistan; Tajikistan

The Uzbek SSR or, officially, the Uzbek Soviet Socialist Republic (UzSSR), also known as Soviet Uzbekistan, simply Uzbekistan, and rarely as Uzbekia, was a union republic of the Soviet Union. It was governed by the Uzbek branch of the Communist Party of the Soviet Union, the legal political party, from 1925 until 1990. From 1990 to 1991, it was a sovereign part of the Soviet Union with its own legislation.

Beginning 20 June 1990, the Uzbek SSR adopted the Declaration of State Sovereignty within its borders. Islam Karimov became the republic's inaugural president.

On 31 August 1991, the Uzbek SSR was renamed the Republic of Uzbekistan and declared independence three months before the Soviet Union's dissolution on 26 December 1991.

Uzbekistan was bordered by Kazakhstan to the north; Tajikistan to the southeast; Kirghizia to the northeast; Afghanistan to the south; and Turkmenistan to the southwest.

== Names ==
The name, Uzbekistan, literally means "Home of the Free", taken from an amalgamation of uz (Turkic: "self"), bek (Turkic: "master"), and -stan (Persian: "land of"). While the various Uzbek-language official names used throughout the history of the republic all used Uzbekistan, the official Russian names used only the adjective Uzbek.

The first official name of the republic was the Uzbek Socialist Soviet Republic. In the official Yaña imlâ-style modified Arabic-based script, this official name in Uzbek was ئوزبيكستان ئيجتيماعى شورالار جومهورييەتى. With the introduction of the Yañalif-based Latin alphabet in 1929, this became Ɵzʙekistan Ьçtьmaьj Şora Çymhyrijəti. (Note: Şora is also sometimes written Şoralar (Sho‘rolar / Шўролар).) Spelling reforms in 1934 changed this to Ozʙekistan Içtimaij Şora Çumhurijəti. In modern Uzbek, this would be Oʻzbekiston Ijtimoiy Sho‘ro Jumhuriyati (Ўзбекистон Ижтимоий Шўро Жумҳурияти). In 1936, like with the other republics of the Soviet Union, the words Socialist and Soviet were reversed in the official name of the Uzbek SSR, Узбекская Советская Социалистическая Республика (Uzbekskaja Sovetskaja Socialističeskaja Respublika) in Russian, which was reflected in the Constitution of 1937. With the process of "internationalization of national languages" (i.e. Russification), Arabic-derived words like sho‘ro, ijtimoiy, and jumhuriyati were replaced with Russian cognates, and in 1940, Uzbek was switched to Cyrillic script. The new Uzbek name of the republic was Ўзбекистон Совет Социалистик Республикаси (Oʻzbekiston Sovet Sotsialistik Respublikasi).

With the collapse of the Soviet Union in 1991, the Uzbek SSR was renamed the Republic of Uzbekistan upon its declaration of independence on 31 August of that year.

== History ==
In 1924, the borders of political units in Central Asia were changed along ethnic lines determined by Vladimir Lenin's Commissar for Nationalities, Joseph Stalin. The Turkestan ASSR, the Bukharan People's Soviet Republic, and the Khorezm People's Soviet Republic were abolished and their territories were eventually divided into five separate Soviet Socialist Republics, one of which was the Uzbek Socialist Soviet Republic, created on 27 October 1924. The next year Uzbekistan became one of the republics of the Union of Soviet Socialist Republics (Soviet Union). In 1928, the collectivization of land into state farms was initiated, which lasted until the late 1930s.

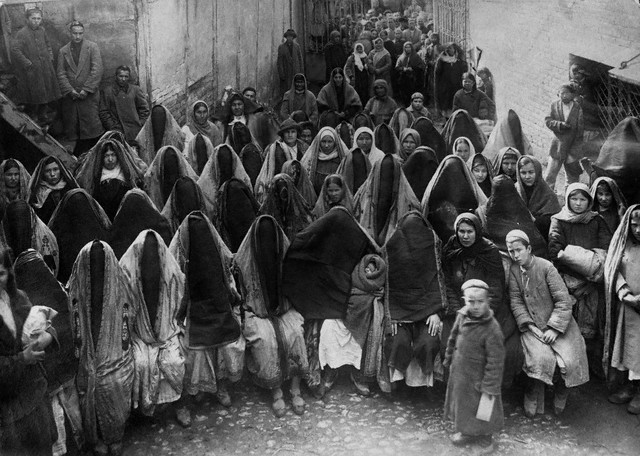
Group of Uzbek women in the old city of Tashkent, 1924

Uzbekistan included the Tajik ASSR until 1929, when the Tajik ASSR was upgraded to an equal status. In 1930, the Uzbek SSR capital was relocated from Samarkand to Tashkent, which remained the capital since. In 1936, Uzbekistan was enlarged with the addition of the Karakalpak ASSR taken from the Kazakh SSR in the last stages of the national delimitation in the Soviet Union. That same year in December, it was renamed to the Uzbek Soviet Socialist Republic. Further bits and pieces of territory were transferred several times between Kazakhstan and Uzbekistan after World War II.

In 1937–1938, during the Great Purge, a number of alleged nationalists were executed, including Faizullah Khojaev, the first prime minister.

During World War II, many industries were relocated to Uzbekistan from vulnerable locations in western regions of the USSR to keep them safe. Large numbers of Russians, Ukrainians and other nationalities accompanied the factories, altering the demographics of the republic. The demographics situation was further aggravated by Stalin's forced deportation of some ethnic groups suspected of collaboration with the Axis powers (including Nazi Germany) from other parts of the Soviet Union to Uzbekistan. This included large numbers of ethnic Koreans, Crimean Tatars, and Chechens.

During the Soviet period, Islam became a focal point for the anti-religious drives of Communist authorities. The government closed most mosques, and religious schools became anti-religious museums. The Soviet period also achieved virtual elimination of illiteracy, even in rural areas. Only a small percentage of the population was literate before 1917; this percentage increased to nearly 100 percent under the Soviets.

Another major development, one with future catastrophic impact, was the drive initiated in the early 1960s to substantially increase cotton production in the republic. This drive led to overzealous irrigation withdrawals of irrigation water from the Amu Darya and the subsequent Aral Sea ecological disaster.

Towards the end of the Soviet–Afghan War, several troops crossed the Uzbek border from Afghanistan as part of the Soviet withdrawal on 15 February 1989. During the war Afghan mujahideen sponsored by the U.S. Central Intelligence Agency and the Pakistani Inter-Services Intelligence also crossed the border to commit sabotage operations.

The Communist Party was the only legal party in the Uzbek SSR until 1990. The first secretary, or head, of the Communist Party of Uzbekistan was consistently an Uzbek. Long-time leader of the Uzbek SSR was Sharof Rashidov, head of the Communist Party of Uzbekistan from 1959 to 1983. Islam Karimov, leader of the Communist Party of Uzbekistan since 1989 and subsequently head of that party's reincarnation, the People's Democratic Party (PDP), became president of the Uzbek SSR in 1990. On 20 June 1990, the Supreme Soviet adopted the Declaration of State Sovereignty of the Uzbek SSR, which took over the laws of the Soviet Union days after the Russian SFSR adopted theirs.

=== Independence ===
Flag of the Uzbek SSR/Uzbekistan, adopted on 18 November 1991

The Uzbek SSR participated in the referendum in March 1991 as a part of the proposed Union of Soviet Sovereign States. This never came to pass after unsuccessful coup attempt events between 19 and 21 August 1991 in Moscow. In the aftermath, the Uzbek SSR was renamed the Republic of Uzbekistan and declared its independence on 31 August 1991, with the Soviet Union dissolving on 26 December 1991. After independence, the 1978 Constitution remained in use. The referendum was confirmed on 29 December 1991.

== Politics ==
Uzbekistan, akin to the rest of the Soviet republics, was defined by a single-party socialist republic framework, whereby the First Secretary of the Central Committee was the head of the party, the Chairman of the Presidium of the Supreme Soviet as the head of state and the Chairmen of the Council of Ministers served as the head of government in a one-party system led by the CPSU's republican branch, the Communist Party of Uzbekistan. Executive power was exercised by the government and the legislative power was vested in Supreme Soviet where it met for sessions in Tashkent.

Like others union republics available in USSR, Uzbek SSR had an executive body of state authority – Council of Ministers of the Uzbek SSR. Its leader has been a head of government and officially called Chairman of Council of Ministers.

In 1989, its members were:

- Minister for Agriculture;
- Minister for Aviation;
- Minister for Automotive Industry;
- Minister for Culture
- Minister for Construction;
- Minister for Cotton and Wheat Production;
- Minister for Coal Industry;
- Minister for Chemical Industry;
- Minister for Communications;
- Minister for Construction Materials Industry;
- Minister for Dairy and Meat Productions;
- Minister for Education;
- Minister for Electronic Industry;
- Minister for Finance;
- Minister for Food Industry;
- Minister for Foreign Affairs;
- Minister for Foreign Economic Relations;
- Minister for Gas Industry;
- Minister for General Engineering;
- Minister for Geology;
- Minister for Health Care;
- Minister for Heavy Machinery;
- Minister for Special Installations;
- Minister for Instrumentation, Automation and Control Systems;
- Minister for Internal Affairs;
- Minister for Justice;
- Minister for Machinery Industry;
- Minister for Metric Systems;
- Minister for Medical Industry;

== Military ==
Uzbekistan had the strongest Soviet Armed Forces presence of the other Central Asian Republics. Almost all of its troops were personnel of the Turkestan Military District (TurkVO), which was based in Tashkent. Personnel from the TurkVO were distributed between the military of Uzbekistan, as well as the militaries of the other four Central Asian republics when it was dissolved in June 1992. At independence, ethnic Russians filled the ranks of the newly created armed forces, and made up most of the officer corps.

The Uzbek SSR operated its own domestic Ministry of Internal Affairs (MVD) independent of the Ministry of Internal Affairs of the Soviet Union, of which it was a republican affiliate organization.

== Economy ==
Uzbekistan had an industrial sector including electric power generation, engineering, and chemical production.

Uzbekistan's energy came from large thermal power plants, including those at Syrdarya, Angren, Tashkent and others. There was also a hydroelectric component to the economy, including the Charvak, Hodzhikentskaya, Gazalkent and Farkhad hydroelectric plants, among others.

The natural gas industry was of importance to the economy of the republic. The Gazly deposits and other and Kashkadarya (Mubarak, Shurtan) area contributed to this industry. Uzbekistan also produced oil (Fergana valley, Bukhara and Surkhandarya region). In terms of minerals, there was production of lead and zinc, tungsten, molybdenum, copper ores (found in the Karamazarskaya group of deposits), and gold (found in the Navoi region, Jizzakh region, and others).

Chemical manufacturing included the production of mineral fertilizers (nitrogen and phosphorus) for cotton (in Chirchik, Kokand, Samarkand, Fergana, Almalyk, and Navoi); the manufacture of chemical fibers (in Fergana); plastics (in Fergana and Namangan), rubber products, household chemicals, and more. The petrochemical, chemical, pharmaceutical, and microbiological industry were all present in some form.

Some of the engineering sector included: agriculture (machinery for the mechanization of cotton cultivation, cotton harvesters, etc.), production of tractors, equipment for the cotton and textile industry, construction and road machines, electrical engineering; aviation, electronic and instrument-making, chemical and petroleum engineering. Some companies also produced cement, asbestos-cement pipes, slate, and ceramics.

Some of the light industry present in Uzbekistan included the primary processing of cotton, silk cocoons, wool, fiber crops, raw hides, and karakul pelts. Cotton and silk textiles, footwear, garments, and carpets were all produced in Uzbekistan.

The food industry produced oil and fat – mainly oil production from cotton seeds, tinned vegetables, butter and cheese, milk, and meat.

== Subdivisions ==
=== List of changes ===
- 27 October 1924 – creation of Uzbek Soviet Socialist Republic
- 15 October 1929 – Tajik Autonomous Soviet Socialist Republic and a region around Khujand split off and become the Tajik Soviet Socialist Republic
- 5 December 1936 – Karakalpak Autonomous Soviet Socialist Republic was joined to the Uzbek SSR
- 16 February 1963 – Syr Darya Oblast (center: Guliston) is formed
- 29 December 1973 – Dzhizak Oblast split from Samarkand Oblast, Dzhizak Oblast is formed.
- ca. 1981 – Navoiy Oblast split from Bukhara Oblast
- 20 April 1982 – Ru WP Navoiy Oblast is formed.

=== 1927 ===
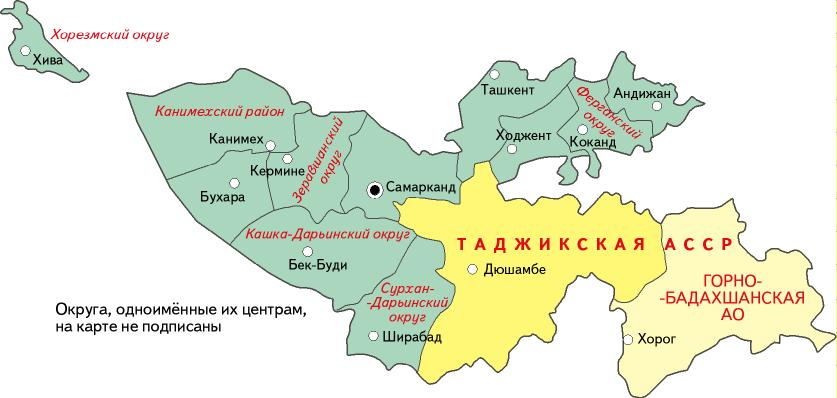
The Uzbek SSR in 1927, including Tajik ASSR and Khodzhent

- Khorezm Okrug (cap: Khiva)
- Kanimekh Raion (cap.: Kanimekh)
- Bukhara
- Zeravshan Okrug (cap: Kermine)
- Kashka-Darin Okrug (cap: Bek-Budi)
- Samarkand
- Surkhan-Darshin Okrug (cap: Shirabad)
- Tashkent
- Khotshent
- Fergan Okrug (capital: Kokand)
- Andizhan
- Tajik ASSR (capital Dyushambe)
  - Dyushambe Oblast (capital Dyushambe)
  - Garm Oblast (capital Garm)
  - Gorno-Badakhshan Oblast (capital Khorog)
  - Kulyab Oblast (capital Kulyab)
  - Kurgan-Tyube Oblast (capital Kurgan-Tyube)
  - Pendjikent Oblast (capital Pendjikent)
  - Ura-Tyube Oblast (capital Ura-Tyube)

=== 1936 ===
Constitution of the USSR:

ARTICLE 26. The Uzbek Soviet Socialist Republic consists of the Bukhara, Samarkand, Tashkent, Ferghana, and Khorezm Regions, and the Kara-Kalpak Autonomous Soviet Socialist Republic.

=== 1938 ===
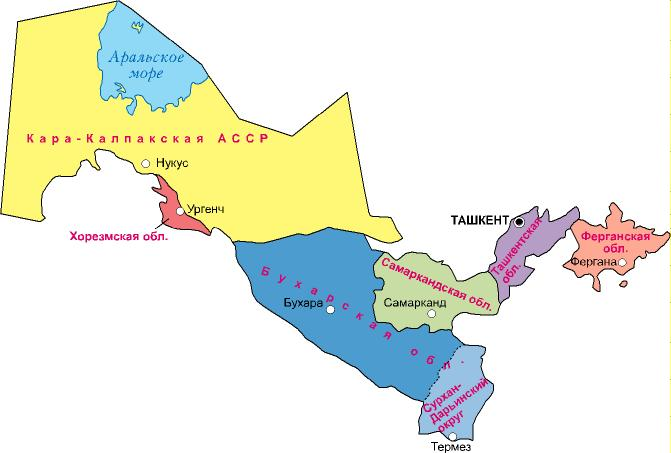
The Uzbek SSR on 1 December 1938

- Karakalpak Autonomous Soviet Socialist Republic (Nukus)
- Khorezm Oblast (cap: Urgench)
- Bukhara Oblast
  - Surkhan-Daryhin Okrug (today: Surxondaryo Region)
- Samarkand Oblast (today: Samarkand Region, Jizzakh Region, Sirdaryo Region)
- Tashkent Oblast (today: Toshkent Region)
- Fergana Oblast (capital: Fergana, today: Namangan Region, Andijan Region, Fergana Region)

=== 1989 ===
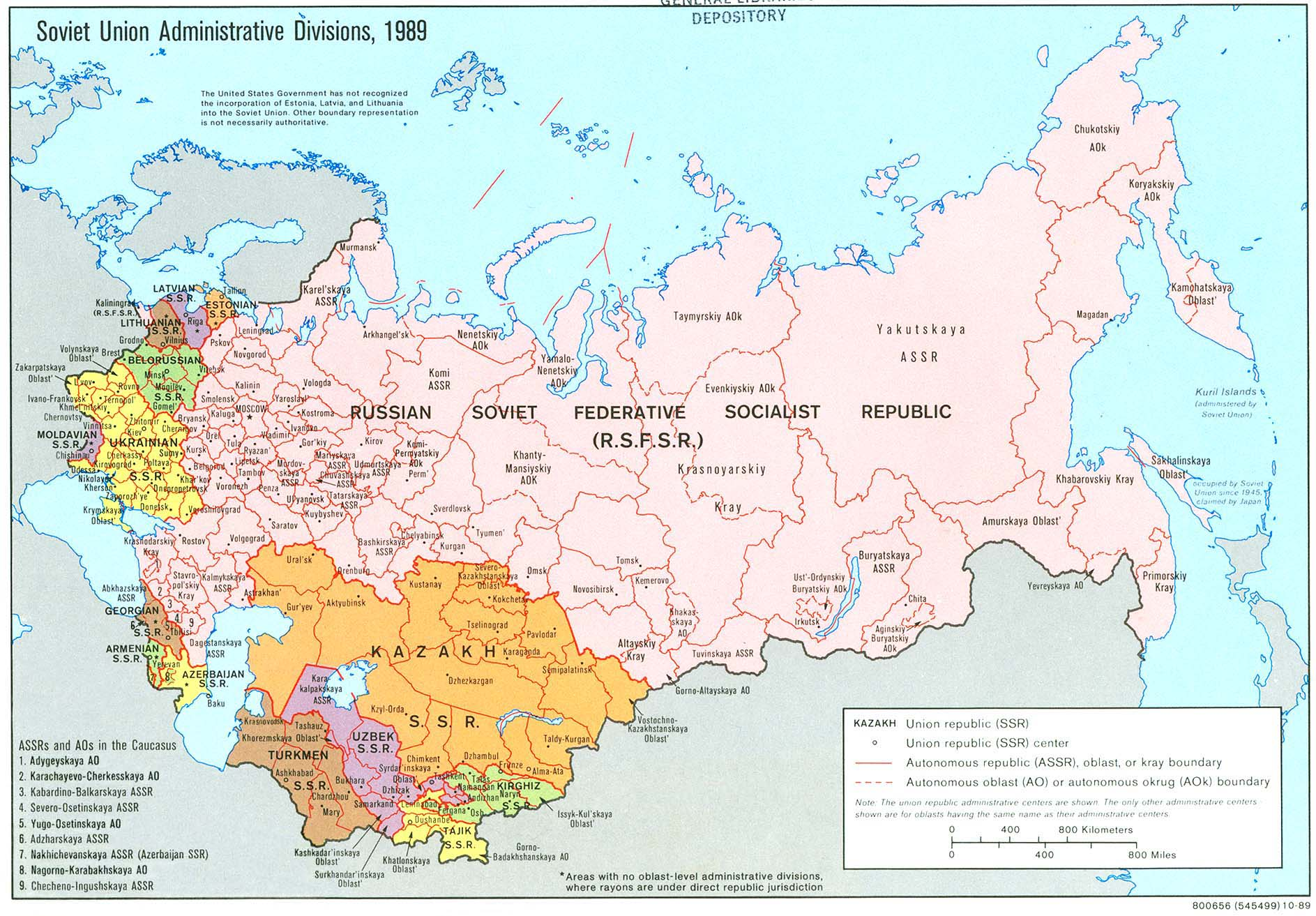
The Uzbek SSR in the Soviet Union, 1989 (Navoi Oblast not shown)

- Karakalpak ASSR
- Khorezm Oblast
- Bukhara Oblast
- Samarkand Oblast
- Kashkadarya Oblast
- Surkhadarya Oblast
- Jizzakh Oblast
- Syrdarya Oblast
- Tashkent Oblast
- Andijan Oblast
- Namangan Oblast
- Fergana Oblast

== See also ==
- Uzbekistan
- Outline of Uzbekistan
