= Konstantin Petrovich von Kaufmann =

Russian military leader (1818–1882)

Konstantin von Kaufmann
- Константин фон-Кауфман
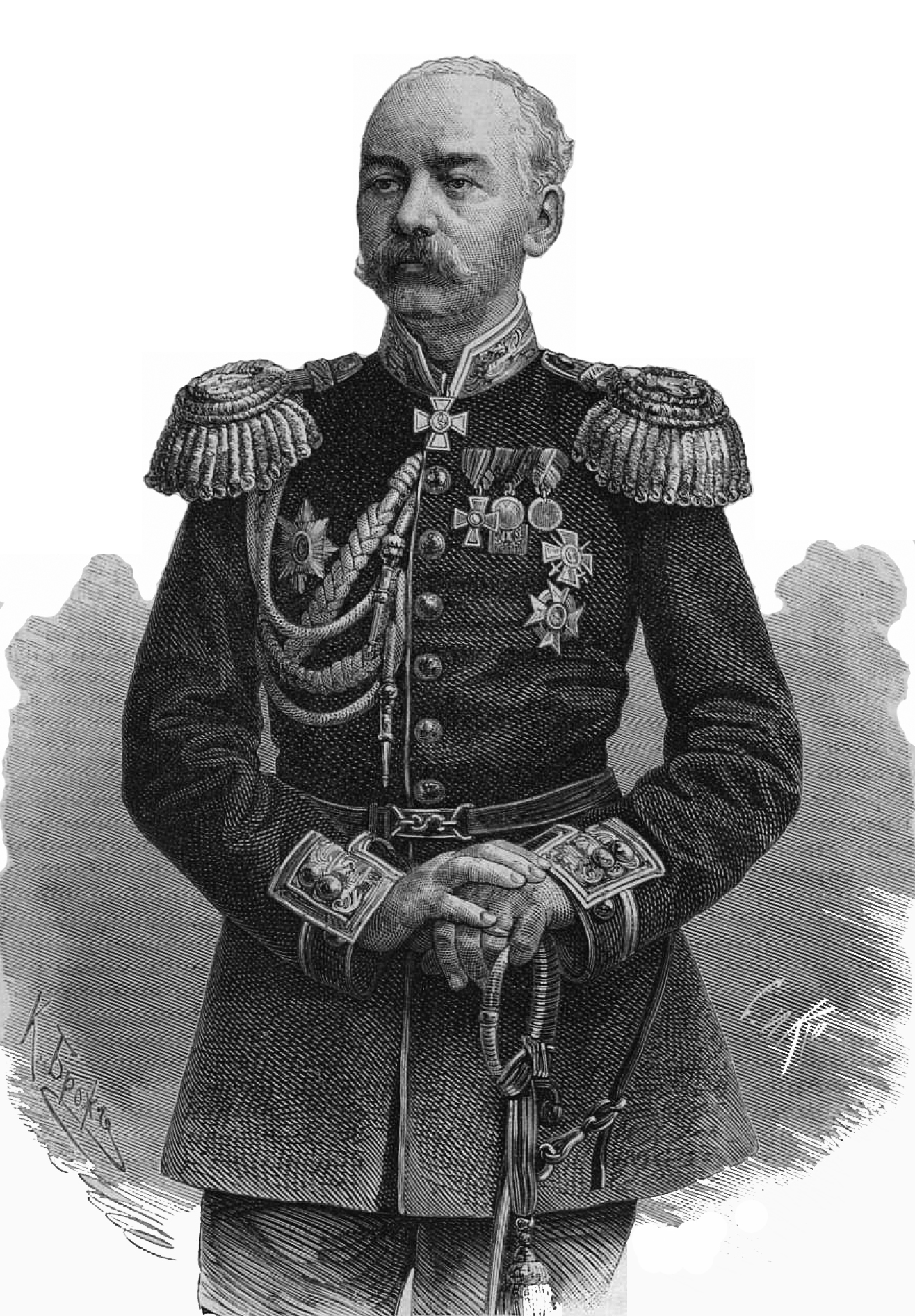
- von Kaufmann in 1873
- Born: 2 March 1818; Dęblin, Congress Poland, Russian Empire
- Died: 16 May 1882 (aged 64); Tashkent, Syr-Darya Oblast, Russian Empire
- Occupations: Military engineer; Governor-General of Russian Turkestan
- Known for: Conquest of Central Asia; Battle of Zerabulak; Khivan campaign of 1873; Kokand expedition of 1875–1876

Konstantin Petrovich von (Note: In German personal names, von is a preposition which approximately means 'of' or 'from' and usually denotes some sort of nobility. While von (always lower case) is part of the family name or territorial designation, not a first or middle name, if the noble is referred to by their last name, use Schiller, Clausewitz or Goethe, not von Schiller, etc.) Kaufmann (Russian: Константин Петрович фон-Кауфман, romanized: Konstantin Petrovich fon-Kaufman; 2 March 1818 – 16 May 1882), was a military engineer and the first Governor-General of Russian Turkestan.

== Early life and ancestry ==
Konstantin Petrovich was born as the second eldest of four sons to Lieutenant General Peter Feodorovich von Kaufmann (1784–1849) and his wife, Emilie Watson-Priestfield-Aithernay (1790–1858). His family was German in origin (from Holstein), but had been in the service of the Tsars of Russia for over 100 years, and had since converted to Russian Orthodoxy. Another source says that he was "descended from an Austrian mercenary who had entered Russian service in the late eighteenth century. A Russian-speaking Orthodox Christian, the only thing German about him was his name".

Kaufmann graduated from Nikolayev Engineering Institute (now Military Engineering-Technical University) as a military engineer. Kaufmann entered the military engineering field in 1838, served in the campaigns in the Caucasus, was promoted to the rank of colonel, and commanded the sappers at the siege of Kars in 1855. On the capitulation of Kars, he was deputed to settle the terms with General William Fenwick Williams.

In 1861, he became director-general of engineers at the War Office, assisting Minister of War Count Dmitry Milyutin in the reorganization of the army.

Promoted lieutenant general in 1864, he became Governor-General of Vilna, where at that time the Tsarist state had begun a policy of expropriating the Polish aristocracy in an attempt to break its influence in the countryside.

== Conquest of Turkestan ==
At the high point of the Russian conquest of Turkestan, in 1867, he became Governor-General of the new province of Turkestan, and held the post until his death, making himself a name in the expansion of the empire in Central Asia. The western part of the Khanate of Kokand along the Syr Darya had already been captured, and the independence of the rest of that country became merely nominal. He accomplished a successful campaign in 1868 against the Emirate of Bukhara, capturing Samarkand and gradually subjugating the whole country.

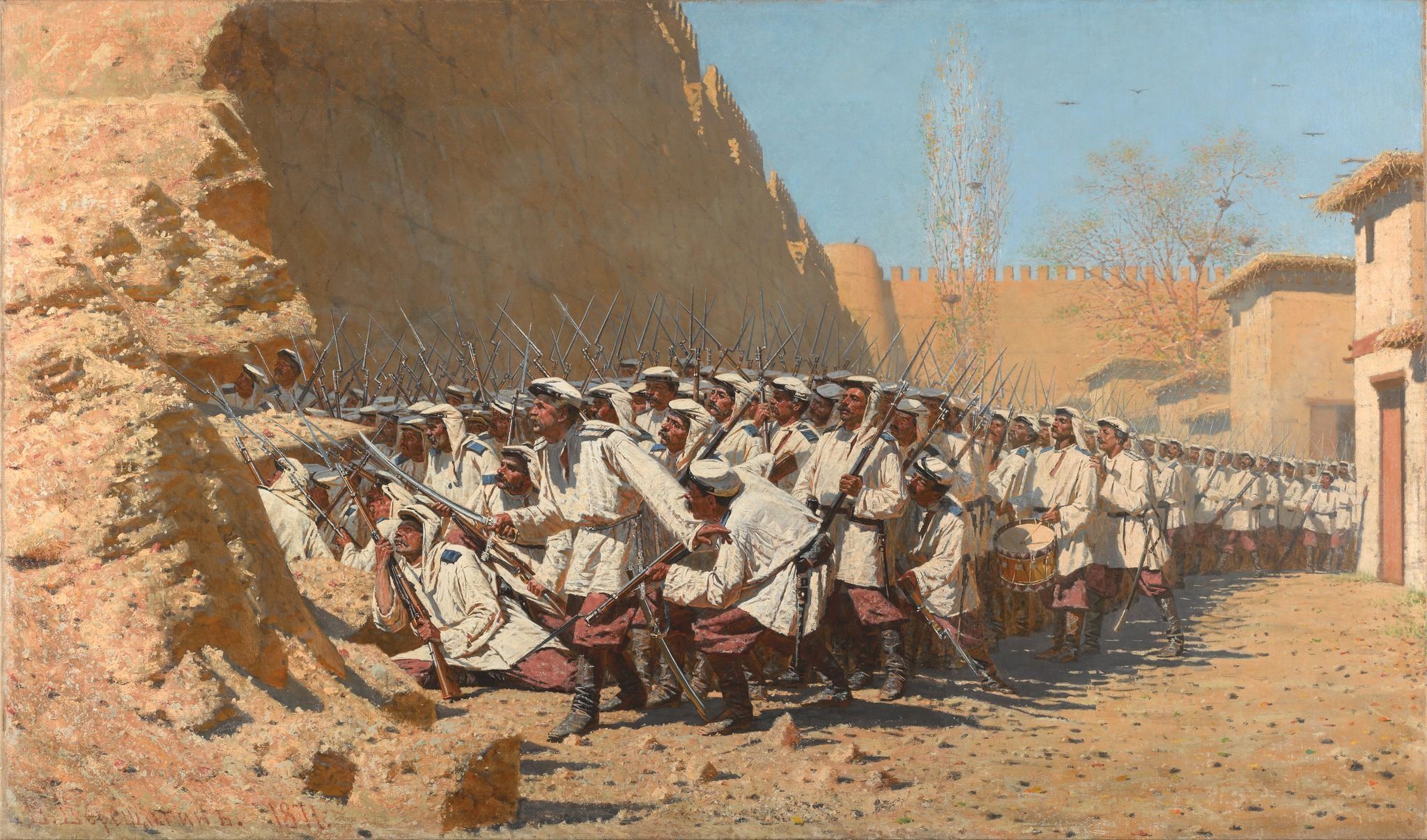
The painter Vasily Vereshchagin accompanied Kaufmann in his campaigns.

During the Khivan campaign of 1873, he attacked Khanate of Khiva, took the capital, and forced the Khan to become a vassal of Russia. This was followed in 1875 by the campaign against Kokand, in which Kaufman defeated the uprising khan, Nasreddin, after an anti-Russian uprising against the previous ruler, Khudoyar. The fiction of Kokand's independence was ended, and the remaining rump of the Khanate in the Ferghana Valley was annexed. This rapid absorption of these Khanates brought Russia into proximity to Afghanistan, and the reception of Kaufmann's emissaries by the Sher Ali Khan was a main cause of the Second Anglo-Afghan War.

== Administration ==
The various temporary statutes under which Turkestan was administered from 1867 to 1886 gave von Kaufmann a great deal of latitude in policy. In 1868 he contacted experts in Moscow to identify Alexei and Olga Fedchenko to create an expedition to document the country's natural history.

While Kaufmann was still extending the borders of the Russian Empire, he was creating a team to investigate and document the new territory. Kaufmann's team included statisticians, the Fedchenkos, the war artist Vasily Vereshchagin and later the educationalist Nikolai Ostroumov. Kaufmann wanted an investigation of a "newly and scarcely explored region". Kaufmann set up a Tashkent outpost of the Moscow Society of Devotees of Natural Science, Anthropology, and Ethnography (OLEAE).

The Fedchenkos made three separate explorations between 1868 and 1872. These investigations were central to the Governor-General's policy as he wanted to see this information shared with Russians as well as locals. The local newspaper was used to publish the scientific findings. Kaufmann targeted the 1872 Moscow All-Russian Technical Exhibition as an opportunity to display the research of this new part of the Russian empire.

Kaufmann was allowed to carry out administrative negotiations with neighbouring states on his own account, to establish and oversee the expenditure of the budget, set taxes, and establish the privileges of Russian subjects in the General-Gubernatorstvo; he also had the power to confirm and revoke death sentences passed in the Russian military courts. Nowhere else in the Russian Empire did a Military Governor-General have this kind of independence from central control, and nowhere else was there such obvious pessimism about the region's potential for integration into the main body of the Empire. Isolated geographically from European Russia by an expanse of Steppe that took two months to cross, it was isolated still more decisively in the minds of Tsarist officials by its dense, ancient and settled Islamic culture. In its early years under Kaufmann, Turkestan was thus also administratively isolated, with many distinctive institutions within the military bureaucracy, that was loosely superimposed on a largely unreformed native administration.

When Kaufmann approached the city of Khiva during the Khivan campaign of 1873, the slaves in Khiva rebelled, informed about the eminent downfall of the city. When Kaufmann army entered Khiva on 28 March, he was approached by Khivans who begged him to put down the ongoing slave uprising, during which slaves avenged themselves on their former enslavers. When Muhammad Rahim Khan II of Khiva returned to his capital after the Russian conquest, the Russian General Kaufmann presented him with a demand to abolish the Khivan slave trade and slavery, which he did.

Although Kaufmann was unable to induce his government to support all his ambitious schemes of further conquest, he was still in office when General Mikhail Skobelev, the hero of the Russo-Turkish war of 1877, was despatched from Tiflis in 1880 and 1881 against the Turkomans of the Akhal-Teke Oasis. Skobelev, although being the effective military governor of the Fergana valley, directing matters from Margelan and New Margelan, was cut short in this second campaign of his in the area. He was recalled. (On 7 July 1882, while staying at a Moscow hotel, on his way to his estate, he died suddenly of a heart attack, shortly before the annexation of Merv). General Chernyayev, the conqueror of Tashkent in 1865, was appointed as his successor.

There are various species of plants are named after him including Tulipa kaufmanniana, Eremurus kaufmannii, Eremostachys kaufmanniana, Gentiana kaufmanniana, and Statice kaufmanniana.

== Personal life ==
He was married to Julie von Berg (1820–1906), daughter of Admiral Moritz Anton August von Berg (1776–1860) and his wife, Marie Niemann (1790–1856). They had one son and a daughter:

- Elena Konstantinovna von Kaufmann (b. 1857), married Privy councilor Peter Alexeevich Kharitonov (1852–1916)
- Mikhail Konstantinovich von Kaufmann (1858–1891), Lieutenant in the Russian Imperial Army, died unmarried

== See also ==
- Turkestan Album
