= Lepsi =

Lepsi Лепсі
- Village
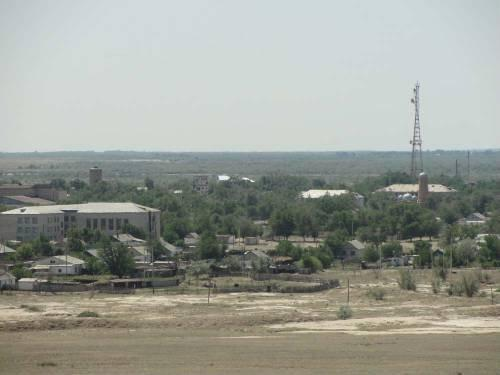

- Location in Kazakhstan
- Coordinates: 46°20′49″N 78°19′55″E
- Country: Kazakhstan
- Region: Jetisu Region
- District: Sarkand District
- Elevation: 1,018 m (3,340 ft)

Population (2009)
  - Total: 2,567
- Time zone: UTC+6 (Omsk Time)

Lepsi (Kazakh: Лепсі, Lepsı), is a village in Sarkand District, Jetisu Region, in south-eastern Kazakhstan, located at an altitude of 1,018 meters above sea level. It is 124 km (82 miles) away from the regional center Taldykorgan and 924 km (574 miles) from the capital city of Nur-Sultan. It is located to the south of Lake Balkhash, on the Lepsy River. It is a stop on the train between Almaty and Semey on the Turkestan–Siberia Railway.

The village is the seat of Lepsi Rural District, which also includes the village Kokzhide (Көкжиде, pop. 489) and railway stations Akbalik (Акбалик, pop. 90), Arganati (Арганати, pop. 40), Karatas (Каратас, pop. 94), Keregetas (Керегетас, pop. 14), Kokshalgin (Кокшалгин, pop. 25), and Sarikurak (Сарикурак, pop. 19).
