= Fergana Oblast =

Oblast of the Russian Empire (1876–1917)

Coordinates: 40.5286°N 70.9425°E

Fergana Oblast Ферганская область (Russian)
- Oblast
- Coat of arms

- Location in the Russian Empire as of 1914
- Country: Russian Empire
- Governorate-General: Turkestan
- Established: 1876
- Abolished: 1917
- Capital: Skobelev (modern-day Fergana)

Area
  - Total: 160,141 km^{2} (61,831 sq mi)

Population (1897)
  - Total: 1,572,214
  - Density: 9.81769/km^{2} (25.4277/sq mi)

The Fergana Oblast (Note: Russian: Ферга́нская о́бласть, romanized: Fergánskaya óblastʼ; Uzbek: Fargʻona viloyati) was an oblast (province) of the Russian Empire. It roughly corresponded to most of present-day Fergana Valley. It was created in 1876 when the territories of the former Khanate of Kokand were annexed to Russia (except for the oblasts of Syr-Darya Oblast and Semirechye Oblast, which were part of the khanate before Russian conquest between 1853 and 1865). Its administrative center was the city of Skobelev (which is in modern-day Fergana).

The Oblast was disbanded after the Russian Revolution and on April 30, 1918 the region became a part of the Turkestan ASSR.

== Administrative division ==
As of 1897, the Fergana Oblast was divided into 5 uyezds:

Uyezd	Uyezd city (pop.)	Area, versta^{2}	Population
Fergana	Novy Margelan (8,928)	14,069.1	321,860
Andizhan	Andizhan (47,627)	13,333.2	360,267
Kokand	Kokand (81,354)	13,212.6	364,658
Namangan	Namangan (62,017)	15,273.4	363,789
Osh	Osh (34,157)	65,252.7	161,640

== Demographics ==
As of 1897, 1,572,214 people populated the oblast. Turkified Sarts (a name used for Tajiks) constituted the majority of the population. Significant minorities included Kyrgyz and Tajiks. The total Turkic-speaking population numbered 1,439,989 (91.6% of the total population of the oblast).

=== Ethnic groups in 1897 ===
Group	Number	Percentage
Sarts	788,989	50.2%
Unspecified Turkic dialects	261,234	16.6%
Kyrgyz	201,579	12.8%
Uzbeks	153,780	9.8%
Tajiks	114,081	7.3%
Uyghurs	14,915	0.9%
Karakalpaks	11,056	0.7%
Russians	8,140	0.5%
Kipchak	7,584	0.5%
Jews	1,378	...
TOTAL	1,572,214	100%
