= Russian Turkestan =

1867–1918 Governorate-General of the Russian Empire

Turkestan Governorate-General Туркестанское генерал-губернаторство (Russian) Туркестанский край (Russian)
- Governorate-General of Russian Empire
- 1867–1918
- Coat of arms

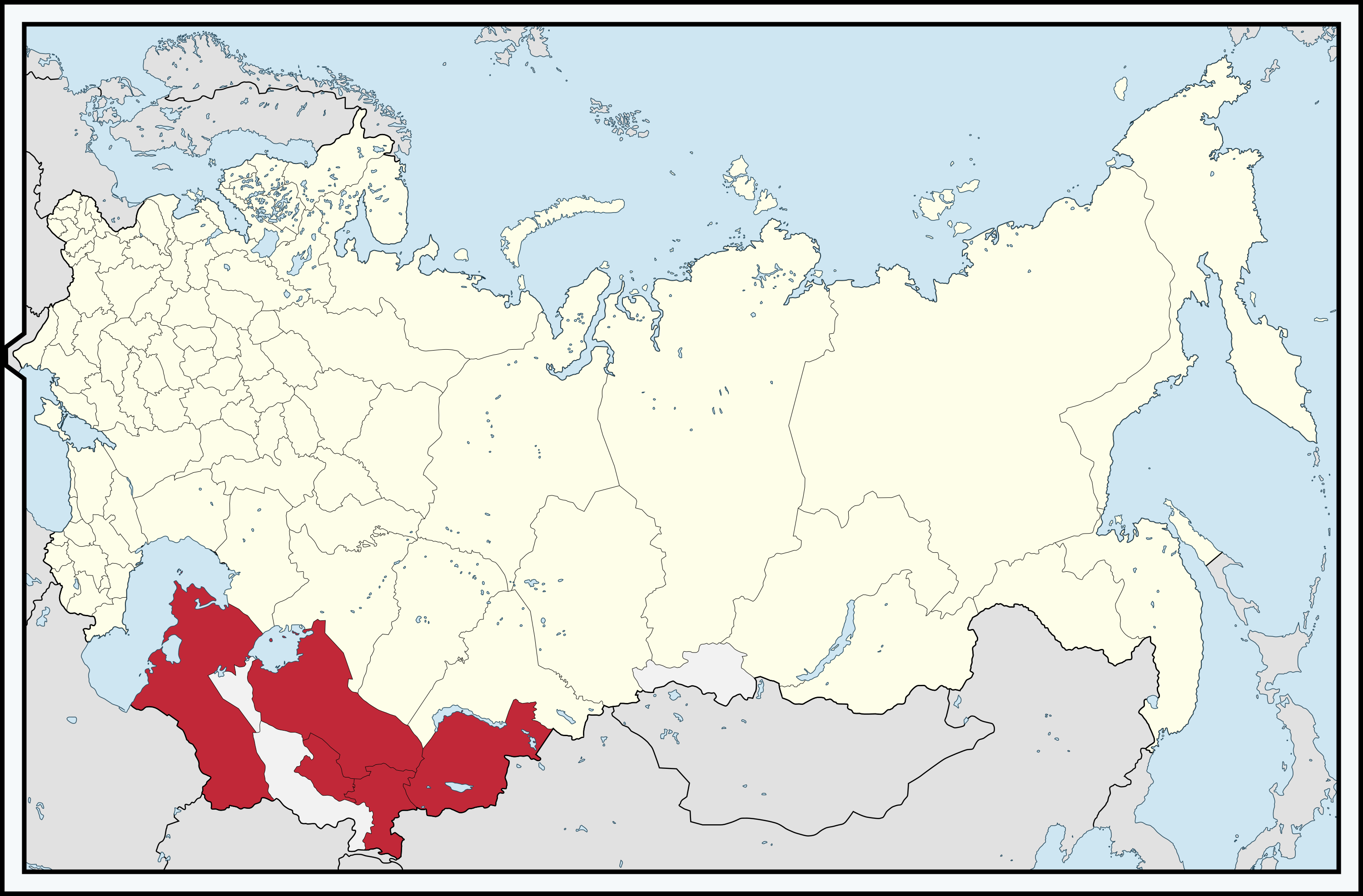
- Location in the Russian Empire

Anthem
- "God Save the Tsar!"; Russian: Боже, Царя храни!
- Capital: Tashkent
- Demonym: Turkestani
- Area
  - 1897 (Russian Empire Census): 1,707,003 km^{2} (659,078 sq mi)
- Population
  - 1897 (Russian Empire Census): 5,280,983
- History
  - Established: 23 July 1867
  - Disestablished during the Russian Revolution: 30 April 1918
- Political subdivisions: Oblasts: 5 (since 1898)
Preceded by
Khanate of Kokand
Turkestan Oblast (Russian Empire)
Succeeded by
Kokand Autonomy
Turkestan ASSR
Transcaspian Government
- Today part of: Kazakhstan, Kyrgyzstan, Tajikistan, Turkmenistan, Uzbekistan

Russian Turkestan (Note: Russian: Русский Туркестан, romanized: Russkiy Turkestan) was the vast region of Central Asia governed by the Russian Empire, often described by historians as a colonial possession. It was formally organized as the Turkestan Governorate-General (Note: Russian: Туркестанское генерал-губернаторство, romanized: Turkestanskoye general-gubernatorstvo) in 1867, and was also known as the Turkestan Krai (Note: Russian: Туркестанский край, romanized: Turkestanskiy kray) from 1886 onward. For administrative and military purposes, its territory was managed as the Turkestan Military District.

It comprised the oasis regions south of the Kazakh Steppe but excluded the Russian protectorates of the Emirate of Bukhara and the Khanate of Khiva. While these states retained internal autonomy, their independence was largely nominal, as Russia controlled their foreign relations and military affairs. The population consisted primarily of speakers of Uzbek, Kazakh, Kyrgyz, and Tajik, with a significant Russian settler minority.

== History ==
=== Establishment ===
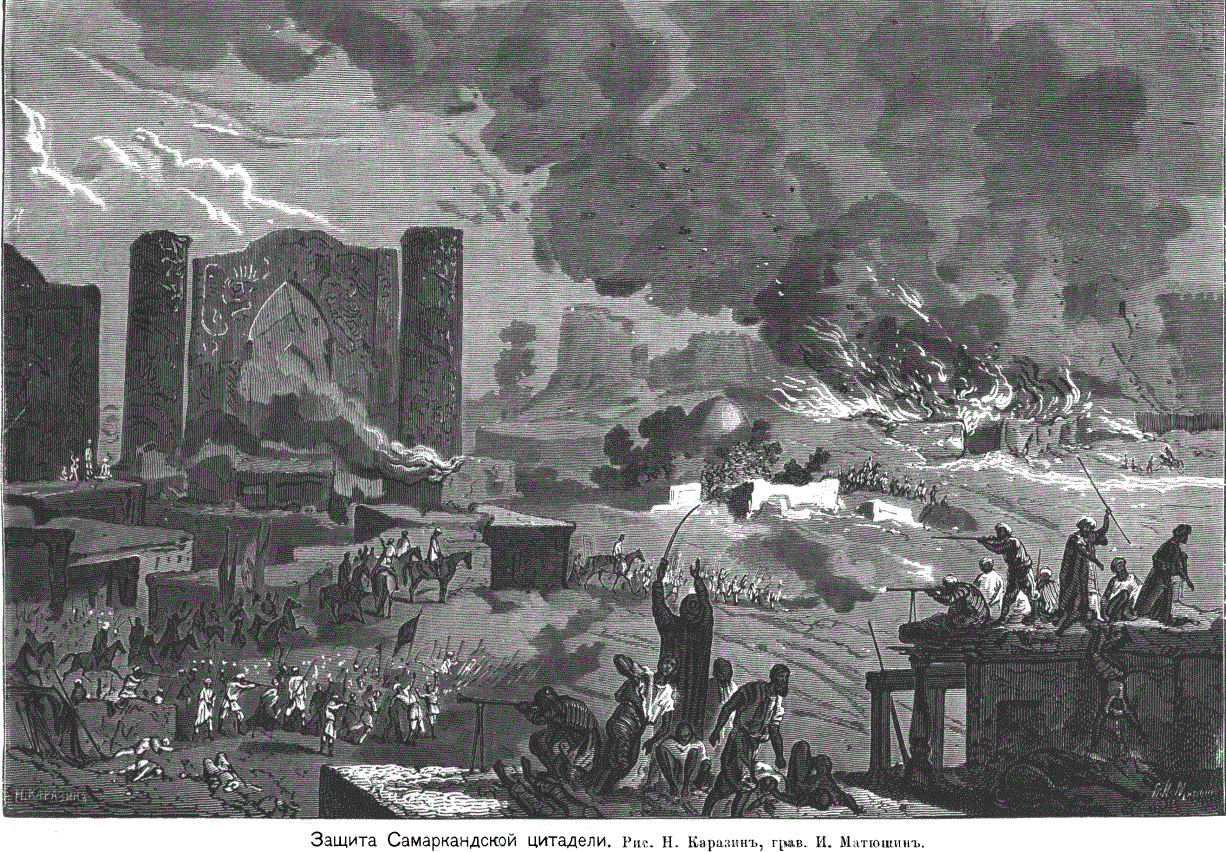
The Defence of the Samarkand Citadel in 1868

Although Russia had been pushing south into the steppes from Astrakhan and Orenburg since the failed Khivan expedition of Peter the Great in 1717, a more systematic conquest began in the 1850s. After subjugating the Kazakh hordes, Russian forces captured key Kokandi forts, including Ak-Mechet in 1853. However, the most decisive phase of the conquest began in 1865. That year the Russian forces took the city of Tashkent under the leadership of General Mikhail Chernyayev, who expanded the territories of Turkestan Oblast (part of Orenburg Governorate-General). Chernyayev had exceeded his orders (he only had 3,000 men under his command at the time) but Saint Petersburg recognized the annexation in any case. This was swiftly followed by the conquest of Khodzhent, Dzhizak and Ura-Tyube, culminating in the annexation of Samarkand and the surrounding region on the Zeravshan River from the Emirate of Bukhara in 1868.

An account of the Russian conquest of Tashkent was written in Urus leshkerining Türkistanda tarikh 1262–1269 senelarda qilghan futuhlari (Note: The conquests made by the Russian army in Turkestan in the years 1262–1269) by Mullah Khalibay Mambetov.

=== Expansion ===
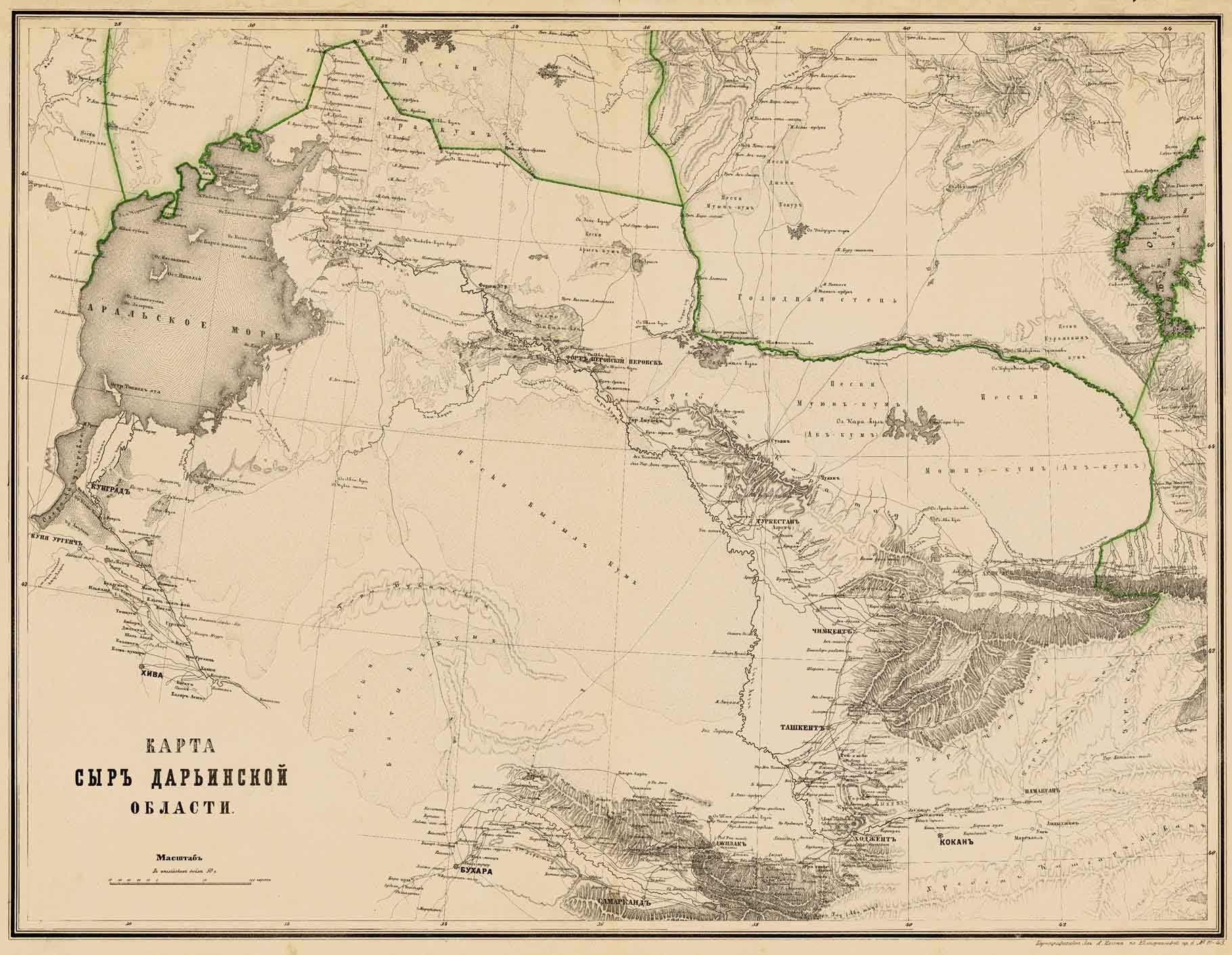
Map of the Syr-Darya Oblast in 1872

In 1867, Turkestan was made a separate Governorate-General, under its first Governor-General, Konstantin Petrovich von Kaufman. Its capital was Tashkent and it initially consisted of two oblasts (provinces), Syr-Darya Oblast and Semirechye Oblast. In 1868, the Zeravshan Okrug was formed from annexed Bukharan territory; it was reorganized in 1887 into the Samarkand Oblast. To these were added in 1873 the Amu Darya Division (Russian: отдел, romanized: otdel), annexed from the Khanate of Khiva, and in 1876 the Fergana Oblast, formed from the remaining rump of the Kokand Khanate that was dissolved after an uprising in 1875. In late 1897, an imperial decree decreed the inclusion of the Transcaspian Oblast (conquered in 1881–1885 by generals Mikhail Skobelev and Mikhail Annenkov) and the return of Semirechye Oblast, formally completing the five-oblast structure by 1898.

=== Colonization ===
The administration of the region had an almost purely military character throughout. Following Von Kaufman's death in 1882, a committee led by Fedor Karlovich Giers (or Girs), brother of the Russian Foreign Minister Nikolay Karlovich Giers, toured the region and drew up reform proposals, which were implemented after 1886. In 1888 the new Trans-Caspian railway, begun at Uzun-Ada on the shores of the Caspian Sea in 1877, reached Samarkand. Nevertheless, Turkestan remained an isolated colonial outpost. Its administration preserved many features from the previous Islamic regimes, such as Qadis' courts. Russia implemented a system of indirect rule, devolving much power to a "native" administration of local Aksakals (elders or headmen), which created a sharp distinction from the direct governance systems in European Russia. In 1908, Count Konstantin Konstantinovich Pahlen led another reform commission to Turkestan, which produced in 1909–1910 a monumental report documenting administrative corruption and inefficiency. The Jadid educational reform movement originated among Tatars and spread to Central Asia. This modernist Islamic movement advocated for adapting to modernity through new methods of teaching (usul-i jadid), emphasizing secular education and cultural renewal alongside religious studies.

The Russian administration, particularly under von Kaufman, adopted a policy of "disregard" or benign neglect towards Islam. They avoided state support for Islamic institutions while limiting external influences, intending for traditional Islamic society to stagnate and eventually decline without active persecution, thereby keeping the population isolated from Pan-Islamist or Pan-Turkist movements.

Russian administrative classifications, which often categorized the sedentary population as "Sarts" regardless of language, contributed to the statistical Turkification of Tajiks in Fergana and Samarkand. This categorization favored the Uzbek identity over the Tajik Persian identity, which had historically been dominant in Samarkand.

=== Revolt of 1916 and aftermath ===
In 1897, the railway reached Tashkent, and in 1906, a direct rail link with European Russia was opened across the steppe from Orenburg to Tashkent. This led to much larger numbers of ethnic Russian settlers flowing into Turkestan than had hitherto been the case, and their settlement was overseen by a specially created Migration Department in Saint Petersburg (Russian: Переселенческое управление, romanized: Pereselencheskoye Upravleniye, lit. 'Resettlement Administration'). This caused considerable discontent amongst the local population as these settlers took scarce land and water resources away from them. In 1916, discontent boiled over in the Central Asian revolt of 1916. It was sparked by a decree issued on 25 June 1916, that conscripted the native population, previously exempt from military service, into labour battalions for work on the Eastern Front of World War I. Thousands of settlers were killed, which triggered brutal Russian reprisals, particularly against the nomadic population. To escape the Russian reprisals, many Uzbeks, Kazakhs, and Kyrgyz fled to China, with the Xinjiang region becoming a key sanctuary for fleeing Kazakhs. The Turkmen, Kyrgyz, and Kazakhs were all impacted by the 1916 insurrection caused by the conscription decreed by the Russian government. Order had not fully been restored by the time the February Revolution took place in 1917. This ushered in a still bloodier chapter in Turkestan's history. In early 1918, the Bolsheviks of the Tashkent Soviet launched an attack on the Kokand Autonomy, leaving an estimated 14,000 local inhabitants dead. Resistance to the Bolsheviks by the local population (dismissed as "Basmachi" or "bandits" by Soviet historians) continued well into the early 1930s.

== Economy ==
The economy of the Turkestan Governor-Generalship was fundamentally transformed under imperial rule, evolving from traditional pastoral and oasis agriculture to a colonial economy focused on cotton production and integration with Russian markets.

=== Cotton cultivation ===
Cotton cultivation became the dominant economic sector following supply disruptions during the American Civil War. By the 1850s, Russia's cotton industry had relied on American imports; the 1861–1865 Union blockade made Central Asian cotton a strategic priority. The administration promoted "import substitution," expanding production from local consumption to a major export commodity. The Department of Agriculture established experimental stations, distributed seeds, and provided technical assistance to encourage expanded cultivation.

=== Irrigation ===
Major waterworks projects were undertaken to expand arable land, particularly in the Hungry Steppe and the Zeravshan oasis. Late-imperial irrigation planning linked water control to imperial authority, though projects often exceeded administrative and fiscal capacity.

=== Trade and transport ===
The completion of the Trans-Caspian Railway (1888) and Orenburg–Tashkent Railway (1906) fundamentally altered regional trade patterns. Traditional caravan routes declined as railways captured long-distance trade. By the 1910s, Russia's trade with Central Asia reached approximately 400 million rubles annually, with cotton forming the largest component of exports.

== Administration and demographics ==
By 1898, the Turkestan Governorate-General was divided into five oblasts (provinces). The population was overwhelmingly rural, with detailed figures recorded in the 1897 Russian Empire census.

The five oblasts of Russian Turkestan, c. 1900

=== Population by oblast ===
The 1897 census provides a detailed breakdown of the population across the five oblasts.

Population of the Turkestan Governorate-General by Oblast (1897 Census)
Oblast	Population	Area (km²)	Capital
Fergana Oblast	1,572,214	125,978	New Margelan (Skobelev)
Syr-Darya Oblast	1,478,398	197,883	Tashkent
Semirechye Oblast	987,863	442,778	Verny
Samarkand Oblast	860,021	110,812	Samarkand
Transcaspian Oblast	382,487	829,552	Ashgabat
Total	5,280,983	1,707,003	—

=== Ethnic composition ===
Ethnic composition as of the 1897 Russian Empire census
Ethnic group	Population	Percentage
Uzbeks (Note: The 1897 census used the term "Sart" for the sedentary Turkic-speaking population, who are largely identified as modern Uzbeks.)	1,995,847	37.8%
Kazakhs (Note: The census termed Kazakhs as "Kirghiz-Kaisaks" to distinguish them from the Kyrgyz people.)	1,283,351	24.3%
Kyrgyz (Note: The census used the term "Kara-Kirghiz" (Black Kirghiz) for the people now known as Kyrgyz, to differentiate them from the Kazakhs.)	689,274	13.1%
Tajiks	350,397	6.6%
Turkmen	281,357	5.3%
Russians	199,594	3.8%
Other groups (Note: Including Ukrainians (42,238), Tatars (55,815), Jews (12,343), Germans (8,526), Armenians (4,862), Poles (3,897), and other minorities.)	481,163	9.1%
Total	5,280,983	100%

=== Governors-General of Turkestan ===
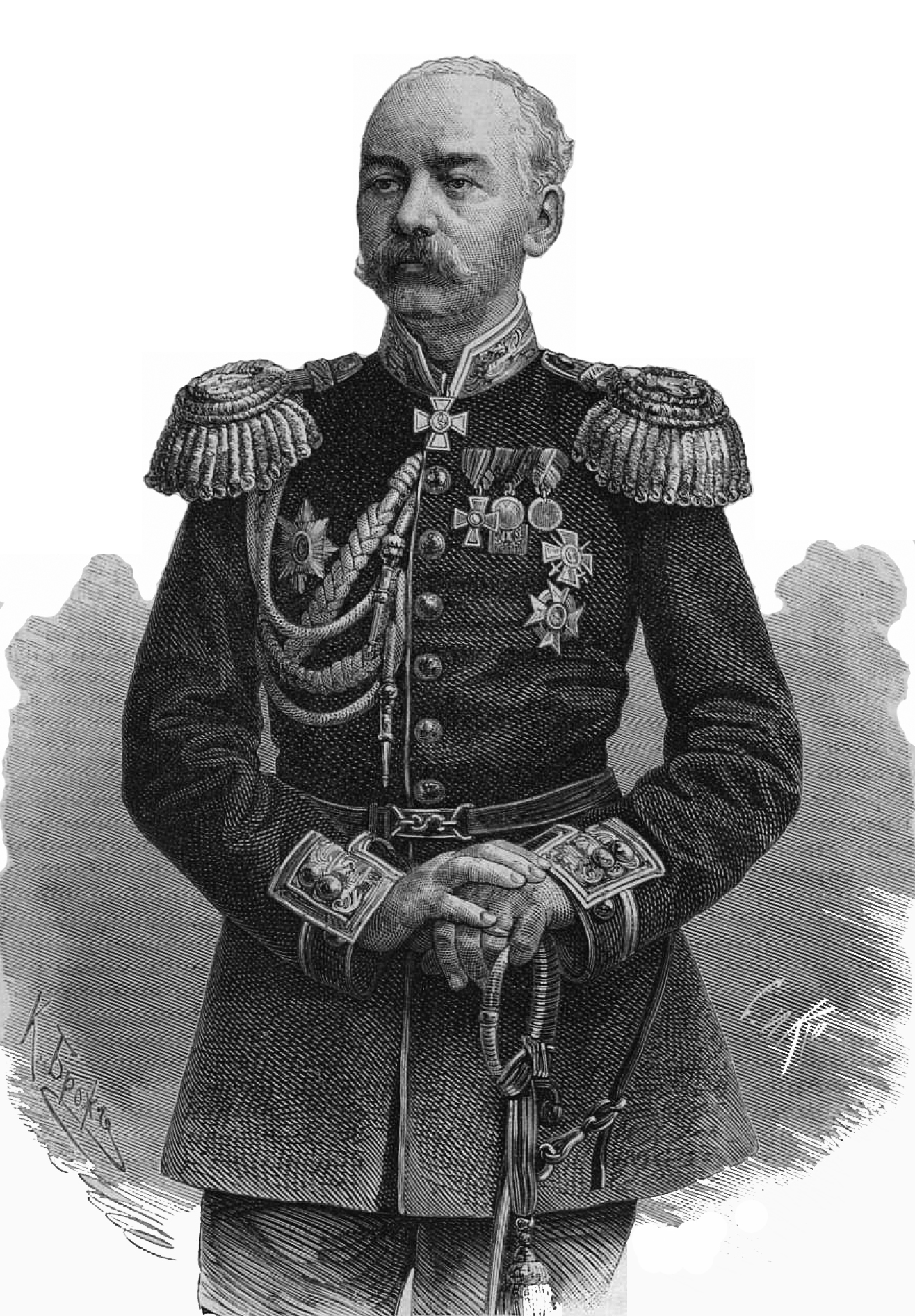
Konstantin von Kaufman, first and longest-serving Governor-General of Turkestan (1867–1882)

The governorate-general was administered by a series of military generals appointed by the Tsar.

Name	Tenure	Military Rank
Konstantin von Kaufman	1867–1882	Engineer-General
Mikhail Chernyayev	1882–1884	Lieutenant General
Nikolai Rozenbakh	1884–1889	General of Infantry
Alexander Vrevsky	1889–1898	Lieutenant General / General of Infantry
Sergei Dukhovskoi	1898–1901	General of Infantry
Nikolai Ivanov	1901–1904	Lieutenant General
Nikolai Tevyashev	1904–1905	General of Cavalry
Dejan Subotić	1905–1906	Lieutenant General
Nikolai Grodekov	1906–1908	General of Infantry
Pavel Mishchenko	1908–1909	General of Artillery
Alexander Samsonov	1909–1914	General of Cavalry
Fedor Martson	1914–1916	General of Infantry
Aleksey Kuropatkin	1916–1917	General of Infantry

== Legal and judicial system ==
The Turkestan judicial system operated through a dual structure that reflected the broader tensions of imperial governance. The administration maintained separate judicial institutions for different populations:

- Imperial courts (established 1898) handled cases involving Russian subjects, utilizing district courts, prosecutors, and justices of the peace based on the Russian judicial statutes of 1864.
- "Native" courts preserved traditional justice under imperial oversight. These included Qadi courts for sedentary populations (applying Islamic law or sharia) and Biy courts for nomadic populations (applying customary law or adat).

However, these traditional institutions operated under significant restrictions. Russian authorities appointed and dismissed judges rather than allowing religious communities to select them independently. All decisions required review by district chiefs or military governors, who could overturn verdicts. This coexistence enabled "forum shopping," where litigants could choose between different legal systems depending on which offered more favourable procedures for their case.

== Urban planning and architecture ==
After 1865, urban development in Turkestan was characterized by the creation of "new cities" (Russian: русский город, romanized: russkiy gorod, lit. 'Russian city') laid out by military engineers next to the pre-conquest "old cities." In Tashkent, the new city was spatially separated from the old city by the Ankhor Canal.

The new districts featured regular grid plans, tree-lined boulevards, and parade squares, contrasting with the winding streets of the traditional quarters. This urban form encoded spatial segregation between the colonial and indigenous communities. Public architecture relied on fired-brick construction, creating a style sometimes labelled "Turkestan modern", encompassing buildings such as the State Bank, the Treasury Chamber, and gymnasiums.

== Soviet rule ==
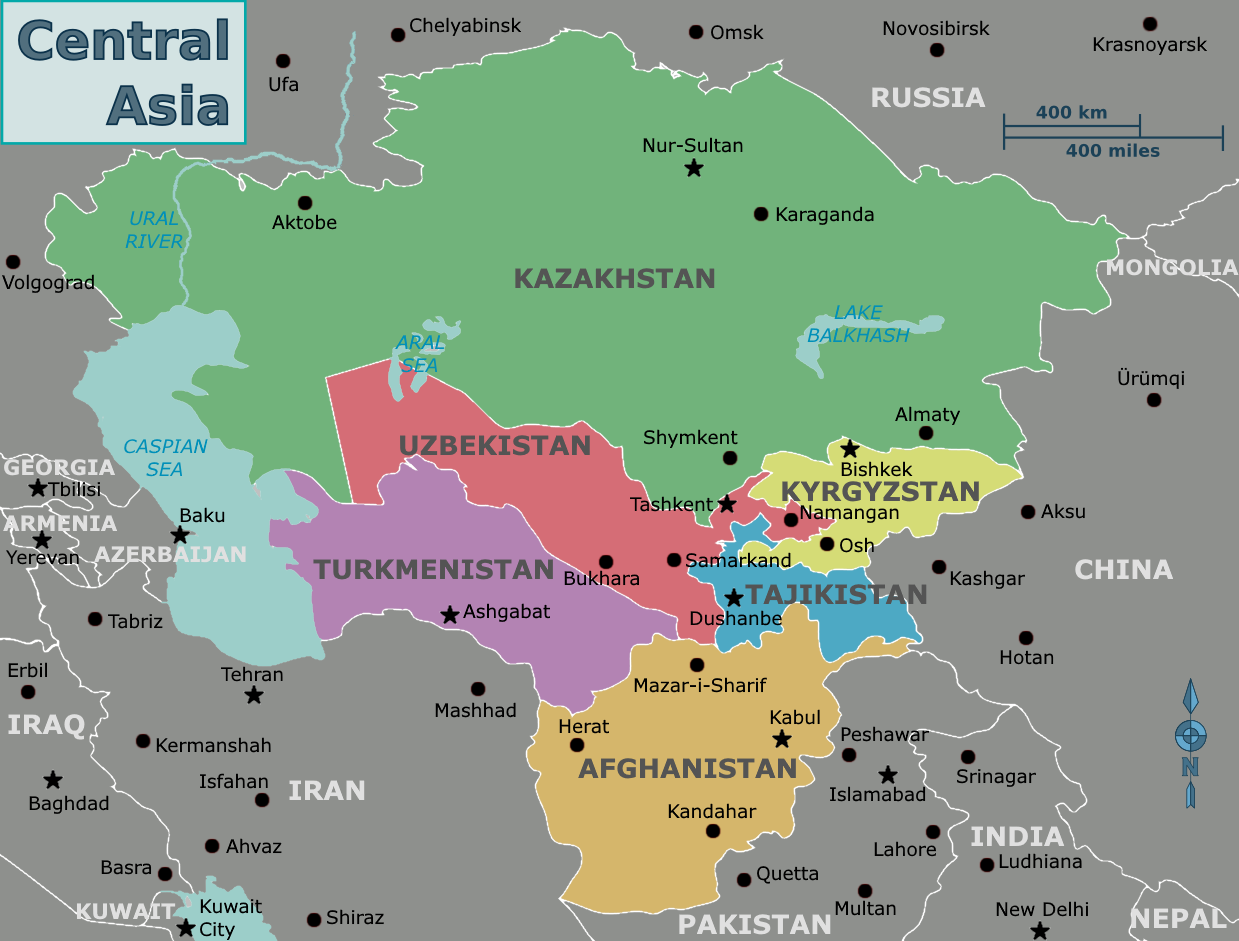
Contemporary Central Asia

After the Russian Revolution of 1917, a Turkestan Autonomous Soviet Socialist Republic (Turkestan ASSR) within the Russian Socialist Federative Soviet Republic was created in Soviet Central Asia (comprising modern Uzbekistan, Turkmenistan, Tajikistan, Kyrgyzstan, and the southern regions of Kazakhstan). After the foundation of the Soviet Union, as part of the national delimitation in Central Asia, it was split into the Turkmen Soviet Socialist Republic (Turkmenistan) and the Uzbek Soviet Socialist Republic (Uzbekistan) in 1924. The Tajik ASSR was established at that time as part of the Uzbek SSR, and was upgraded to a full Soviet Socialist Republic in 1929. In 1936, the Kyrgyz SSR (Kyrgyzstan) was formed from the Kirghiz ASSR, which had been part of the Russian SFSR. After the collapse of the Soviet Union, these republics gained their independence.

== See also ==
- Central Asian possessions of the Russian Empire
- National delimitation in Soviet Central Asia
- Orenburg Cossacks
- Semirechye Cossacks
- Turkestan Military District
- History of Uzbekistan
- History of Kyrgyzstan
- History of Turkmenistan
- History of Kazakhstan
- History of Tajikistan
- Chinese Turkestan
