= Syr-Darya Oblast =

Coordinates: 41.3000°N 69.2667°E

Syr-Darya Oblast Сыръ-Дарьинская область
- Oblast
- Coat of arms

- Location in the Russian Empire as of 1914
- Country: Russian Empire
- Governorate-General: Turkestan
- Established: 1867
- Abolished: 1917
- Capital: Tashkent

Area
  - Total: 504,700 km^{2} (194,900 sq mi)

Population (1897)
  - Total: 1,478,398
  - Density: 2.929/km^{2} (7.587/sq mi)

Syr-Darya Oblast in 1900 (in orange)

The Syr-Darya Oblast (Note: Russian: Сыръ-Дарьи́нская о́бласть, romanized: Syr-Darʼyínskaya óblastʼ; Uzbek: Sirdaryo viloyati) was one of the oblasts of the Russian Empire, a part of Russian Turkestan. Its center was Tashkent.

== History ==
The Syr-Darya Oblast was founded after annexing the northwestern part of Khanate of Kokand, Chimkent (established in 1709, declaring independence from Emirate of Bukhara) and the northwestern part of Khanate of Khiva (for Amu Darya Okrug at present Karakalpakstan) in 1867. Khiva was conquered by the Russians in 1873 who made Sayyid Muhammad Rahim Bahadur Khan II vassal ruler of the region.

From 1905, Pan-Turkist ideologues like Ismail Gasprinski aimed to bridge differences among the peoples who spoke Turkic languages, uniting them into one government. This idea was supported by Vladimir Lenin, and on April 30, 1918, with support of the Bolsheviks in Tashkent, the Turkestan Autonomous Soviet Socialist Republic (ASSR) was established with Tashkent as the capital. During the Russian Empire, the Turkestan ASSR's territory was governed as Turkestan Krai, the Emirate of Bukhara, and the Khanate of Khiva.

Early Central Asia Bolshevik leaders, the Kazakh Turar Ryskulov and the Uzbek Fayzullah Khojaev, believed all territories would sooner or later be unified into one state, Soviet Turkestan.

Without a tradition of national institutions and consciousness prior to the October Revolution of 1917, Central Asia was divided into “national republics” in 1924.

On October 27, 1924 as a result of the national-territorial reorganisation of Central Asia, most of the Syr-Darya region was transferred to the Kara-Kirghiz Autonomous Oblast of the Russian Soviet Federative Socialist Republic (RSFSR), and on 1 February 1926 to the Kyrgyz (Kazakh) ASSR (Kirghiz Autonomous Socialist Soviet Republic), still being a part of the RSFSR. The remaining smaller region Tashkent County became a part of the Uzbek Soviet Socialist Republic (SSR) of the Soviet Union. These borders were not drawn along ethnic or linguistic lines.

The Kirghiz Autonomous Socialist Soviet Republic later transformed into the Kirghiz Soviet Socialist Republic (1936–1990), the Socialist Republic of Kyrgyzstan (1990-1991) and the independent Republic of Kyrgyzstan (1991).

== Geography ==
It bordered Turgay Oblast, Akmola Oblast (the center of which was Omsk), Semirechye Oblast, Samarkand Oblast, Fergana Oblast (until 1876 as Khanate of Kokand before being annexed by Russia), and the semi-independent states of Khanate of Khiva and Emirate of Bukhara.

The area was 504,700 km ² (443,442 sq. m. miles). The greatest stretch of longitude - about 1173 kilometers (1100 miles) in width is about - 747 km (700 miles).

Syr-Darya region occupied by about 70% of the total area Turkestan, and about 25% of the Turkestan province.

== Administrative division ==
Syr-Darya Oblast was originally divided into six uyezds:

- Aulie-Ata (Aulie-Ata was Russian render of "Evliya Ata")
- Kazalinsk
- Perovsk
- Tashkent
- Chimkent
- Amu Darya Okrug (Its center was Petroaleksandrovsk)

== Demographics ==
According to the 1897 census, the total population was 1,478,398 inhabitants (803,411 men and 674,987 women), including the cities of 205,596. With the exception of the regional city of Tashkent as having 155,673 residents (the most populous city in Russian Central Asia) in the Syr-Darya region of large cities do not.

=== Ethnic groups in 1897 ===
Uyezd	Kazakhs	Sarts	Karakalpaks	Uzbeks	Russians	Tajiks	Ukrainians	Other Turkic People
Total	64.4%	9.8%	6.3%	4.3%	2.2%	...	...	10.7%
Aiule-Ata	90.9%	0.5%	...	3.1%	1.9%	...	1.9%	...
Kazalinsk	96.7%	0.4%	...	0.03%	2.0%	...	...	...
Perovsk	97.5%	1.1%	...	...	...	...	...	...
Tashkent	36.4%	24.3%	...	0.11%	3.9%	1.0%	0.65%	31.8%
Chimkent	78.8%	11.2%	...	7.3%	...	...	1.5%	...
Petroaleksandrovsk	24.2%	0.03%	47.9%	17.7%	1.6%	...	...	7.1%

With the exception of Russian and some Orthodox Old Believers and other Europeans, Christians and Jews, the main bulk of the population (96.4%) consists of Muslims.

Today, the territory of the former Syr-Darya Oblast is in eastern Uzbekistan and southeastern of Kazakhstan.

== Sources ==
- Syr Darya region on the map of Turkestan (the end of the 19th and early 20th century), 1.25 MB
- Library Tsarskoye Selo, a book on the history of the Syrdarya Region, PDF
