= Samarkand Oblast =

Coordinates: 39.6542°N 66.9597°E

Samarkand Oblast Самаркандская область
- Oblast
- Coat of arms

- Location in the Russian Empire
- Country: Russian Empire
- Governorate-General: Turkestan
- Established: 1887
- Abolished: 1919
- Capital: Samarkand

Area
  - Total: 68,962 km^{2} (26,626 sq mi)
- Highest elevation (Khazret Sultan): 4,643 m (15,233 ft)

Population (1897)
  - Total: 860,021
  - Density: 12.471/km^{2} (32.300/sq mi)
  - Urban: 15.73%
  - Rural: 94.27%

Samarkand Oblast in 1900 (in yellow)

The Samarkand Oblast (Note: Russian: Самарка́ндская о́бласть, romanized: Samarkándskaya óblastʼ; Uzbek: Samarqand viloyati) was an oblast (province) of the Russian Empire between 1887 and 1924. It roughly corresponded to most of present-day central Uzbekistan and northwestern Tajikistan. It was created out of the northeastern part of the Emirate of Bukhara. It consisted of the uyezds of Samarkand (incl. cities Samarkand and Pendzhikent), Dzhizak (incl. city Dzhizak), Katta-Kurgan (incl. city Katta-Kurgan) and Khodzhent (incl. cities Khodzhent and Uratyube).

== Demographics ==
As of 1897, 860,021 people populated the oblast. Uzbeks constituted the majority of the population. Significant minorities consisted of Tajiks and Kazakhs. The Turkic speaking population amounted to 609,204 (70,8%) people.

=== Ethnic groups in 1897 ===
TOTAL	860,021	100%
Uzbeks	507,587	59%
Tajiks	230,384	26.8%
Kazakhs	63,091	7.3%
Uyghurs	19,993	2.3%
Turkic Sarts	18,073	2.1%
Russians	12,485	1.5%
Jews	1,312	0.2%

== Russian Revolution ==
On April 30, 1918, the region became a part of Turkestan ASSR. On October 27, 1924 as a result of the national-territorial reorganisation of Central Asia, the Samarkand region became a part of the Uzbek SSR of the Soviet Union.
