= Semirechye Oblast =

1867–1924 oblast of the Russian Empire

Coordinates: 43.2500°N 76.9000°E

Semirechyenskaya Oblast Семиреченская область Semirechyenskaya oblast'
- Oblast of Russia
- 1867–1924
- Coat of arms

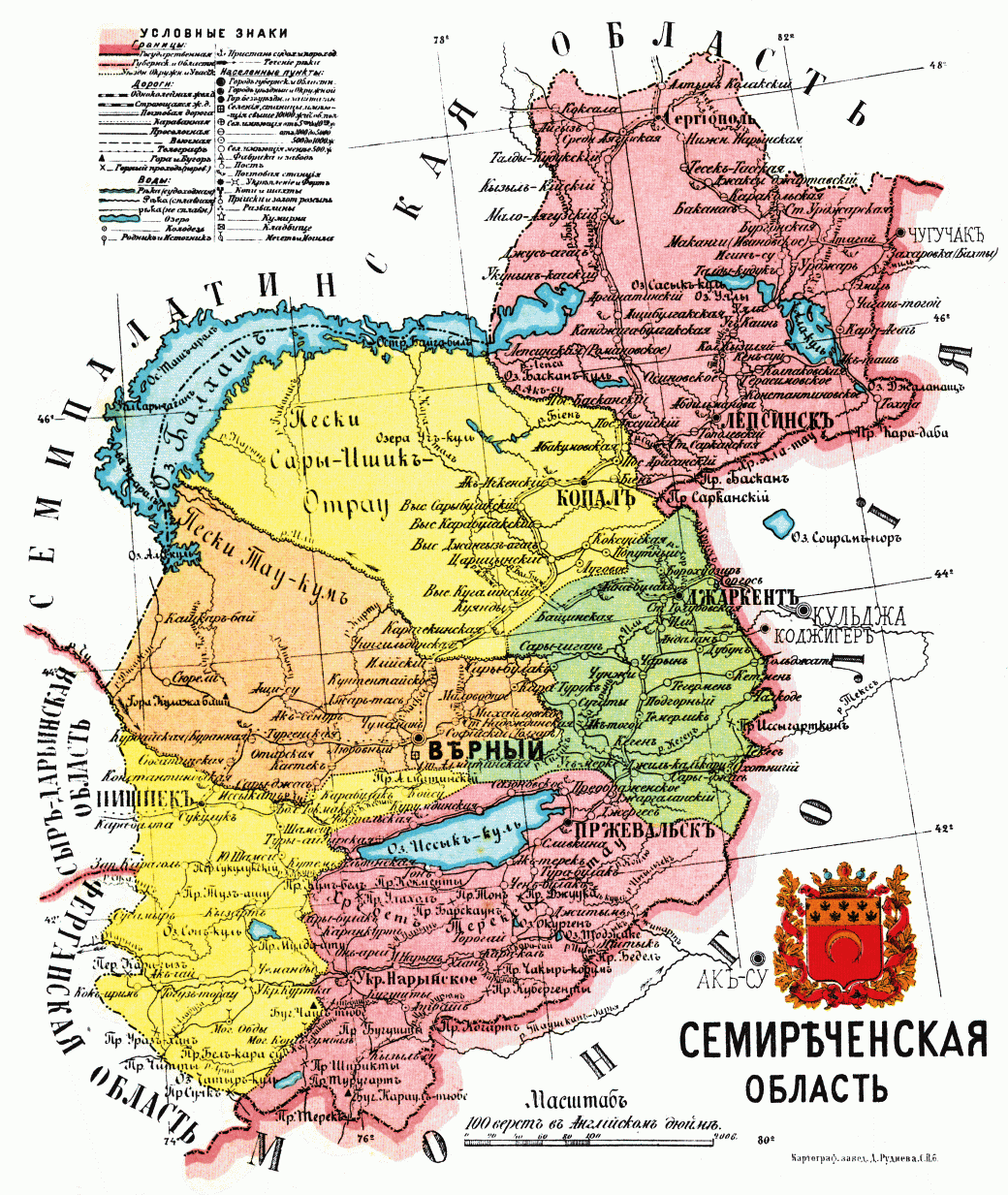
- Capital: Verniy
- History
  - Established: 23 July 1867
  - Disestablished: 27 October 1924
Preceded by	Succeeded by
Oblast of the Siberian Kirghiz; Khanate of Kokand	Turkestan ASSR
- Today part of: Kazakhstan; Kyrgyzstan

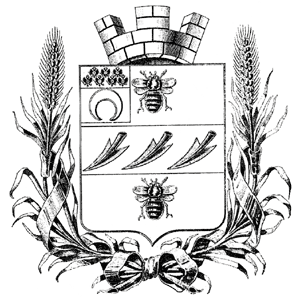
Coat of arms of Pishpek

The Semirechyenskaya Oblast (Russian: Семиреченская область) was an oblast (province) of the Russian Empire. It corresponded approximately to most of present-day southeastern Kazakhstan and northeastern Kyrgyzstan. It was created out of the territories of the northern part of the Khanate of Kokand that had been part of the Kazakh Khanate. The name "Semirechye" ("Seven Rivers") itself is the direct Russian translation of the historical region of Jetysu. Its site of government was Verniy (now named Almaty).

The Russian government seized the Semirechyenskaya region in 1854 and created the province the same year. It was administered as part of the Steppe Governorate-General (which was known as the Governor-Generalship of Western Siberia before 1882) between 1854 and 1867 and again between 1882 and 1899, and part of Russian Turkistan between 1867 and 1882 and again between 1899 and 1917. Russian control of the region was recognized by the Treaty of Saint Petersburg (1881) between Russia and China.

On April 30, 1918 the region became part of the Turkestan ASSR. On October 27, 1924, as a result of the national-territorial reorganisation of Soviet Central Asia, the northern part of the region became part of the Kirgiz ASSR (already created in 1920 and renamed the Kazakh ASSR in 1925 and then established as the union-level Kazakh Soviet Socialist Republic), while the southern part became the Kara-Kirghiz Autonomous Oblast (eventually the Kirghiz ASSR and SR) within the RSFSR.

== Geography ==
It covered a region called Semiriche (southeastern Kazakhstan and northern Kyrgyzstan), the Chui Valley and the mountainous regions of Tian Shan.

It was found in the southeastern part of the Turkestan Governor-General. In the north it bordered the Semipalatinsk region, from the south and east - China (on the Bedel Pass to the southwest by the Tian Shan Range), and from the west the Fergana and Syr Darya oblasts. The oblast covered the territory of lakes Balkhash, Issyk-Kul, and Ala-Kul.

== Administrative division ==
As of 1897, the Semirechye Oblast was divided into 6 uyezds:

Uyezd	Uyezd city (pop.)	Area, sq versta	Population
Verniy	Verniy (22,744)	58330	223,883
Dzharkent	Dzharkent (16,094)	5160	122,636
Kopal	Kopal (6,183)	69100	136,421
Lepsinsk	Lepsinsk (3,230)	87080	180,829
Pishpek	Pishpek (6,615)	80480	176,577
Przhevalsk	Przhevalsk (8,108)	47760	147,517

Its major outposts included Fort Ili (now Qonayev) at the head of navigation on the Ili River.

== Demographics ==
As of 1897, 987,863 people populated the oblast. Kazakhs and Kyrgyz (united as Kirgiz in estimation) constituted the majority of the population. Significant minorities consisted of Russians and Taranchi. Total Turkic speaking were 878,209 (88,9%).

=== Ethnic groups in 1897 ===
TOTAL	987,863	100%
Kyrgyz	794,815	80.5%
Russians	76,839	7.8%
Taranchi	55,999	6.2%
Sart	14,895	1.5%
Chinese	14,130	1.4%

== See also ==
- Russian Turkestan
- Semirechye Cossacks
