= Turgai electoral district =

Constituency of the Russian Republic

Turgai
- Former Civilian constituency for the All-Russian Constituent Assembly
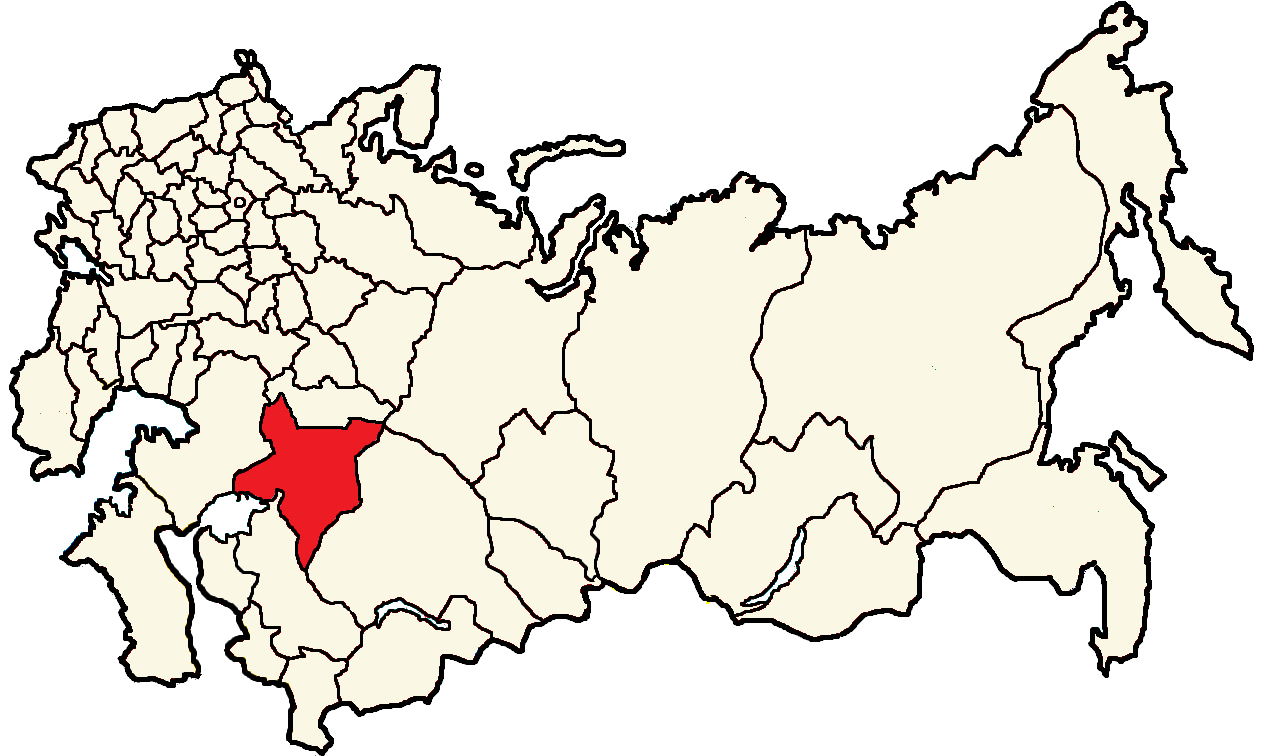

Former constituency
- Created: 1917
- Abolished: 1918
- Number of members: 5
- Number of Uyezd Electoral Commissions: 4
- Number of Urban Electoral Commissions: 1
- Number of Parishes: 114

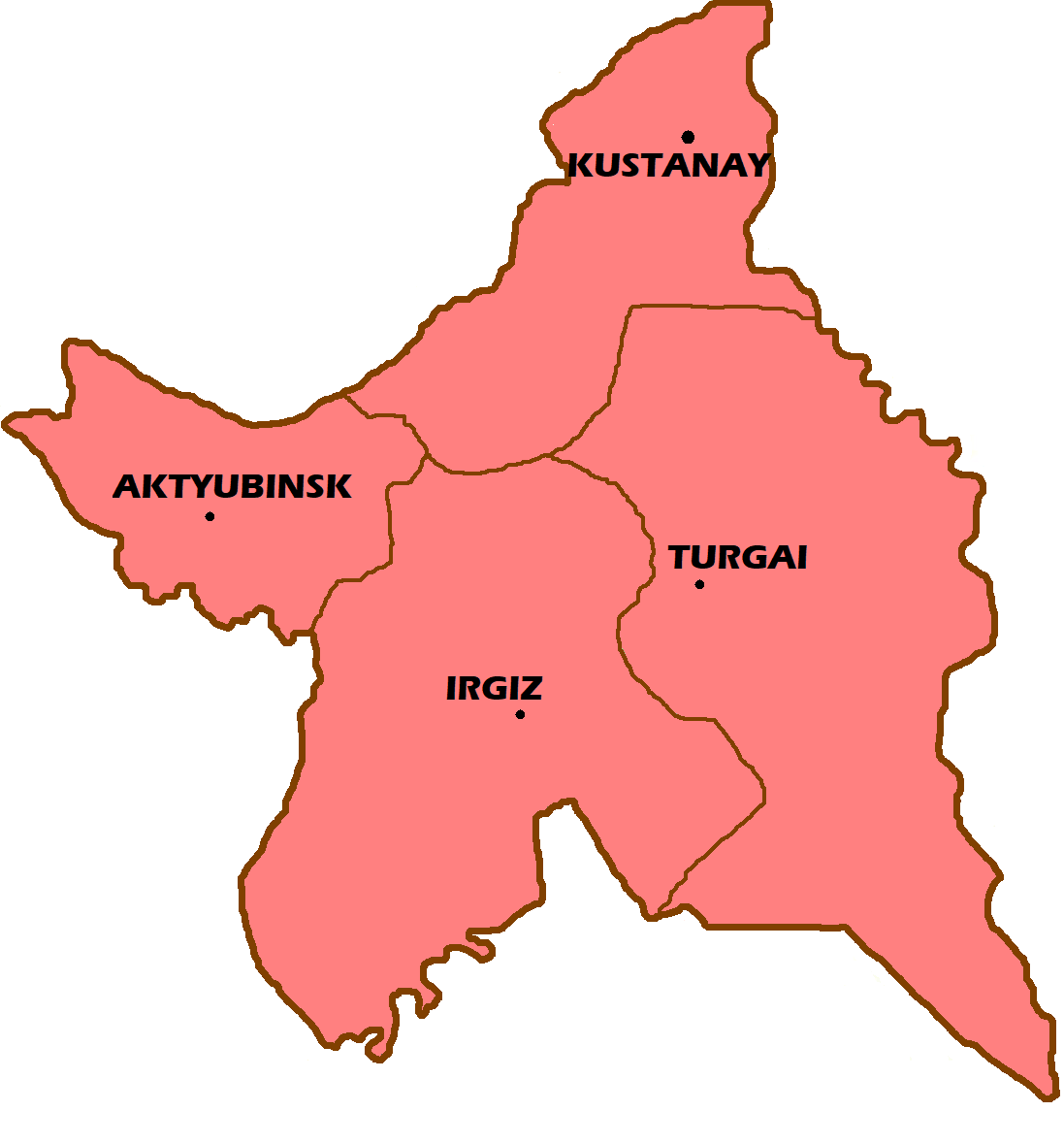
Turgai electoral district - with the boundaries of the 4 uezds shown.

The Turgai electoral district (Russian: Тургайский избирательный округ) was a constituency created for the 1917 Russian Constituent Assembly election. The electoral district covered the Turgai Oblast.

According to U.S. historian Oliver Henry Radkey a vote was held in one uezd, but that the result was not known. Nevertheless, Soviet sources indicate voting took place across the district. Soviet historian L. M. Spirin (whose data is used for the results table below) lists 281,782 votes cast for three different candidate lists. Notably, Radkey rejects these results as unreliable.

The Alash Party list overwhelmingly won the election in the Turgai constituency. In Aktyubinsk and Turgai uezds voting was held November 12–14, 1917. In Aktyubinsk town 1,299 out of some 10,000 eligible voters cast their ballots, with 130 votes (1%) going to the Alash Party. In the Aktyubinsk uezd, 28,022 votes were cast for Alash. In Turgai uezd 54,976 out of some 68,000 eligible voters cast their votes for Alash. In Irgiz uezd 55,349 votes were cast for Alash. In Chelkar 313 votes were cast for Alash. In Kustanay uezd 72,745 votes were cast for Alash.

== Results ==
Turgai
Party	Vote	%
List 1 - Kirghiz Alash Party	211,274	74.98
List 2 - Socialist-Revolutionaries and Congress of Peasants, Soldiers and Workers Deputies	63,750	22.62
List 3 - Mensheviks	6,758	2.40
Total:	281,782	

Deputies Elected
Baitursynov	Alash
Berimzhanov	Alash
Doshchanov	Alash
Temirov	Alash
Pakhomov	SR
