= Kazhymukan Munaitpasov Stadium =

Kazhymukan Munaitpasov Stadium may refer to:

- Kazhymukan Munaitpasov Stadium (Astana), a multi-purpose stadium in Astana, Kazakhstan
- Kazhymukan Munaitpasov Stadium (Shymkent), a multi-purpose stadium in Shymkent, Kazakhstan
