= Astana Arena =

Sports venue in Astana, Kazakhstan

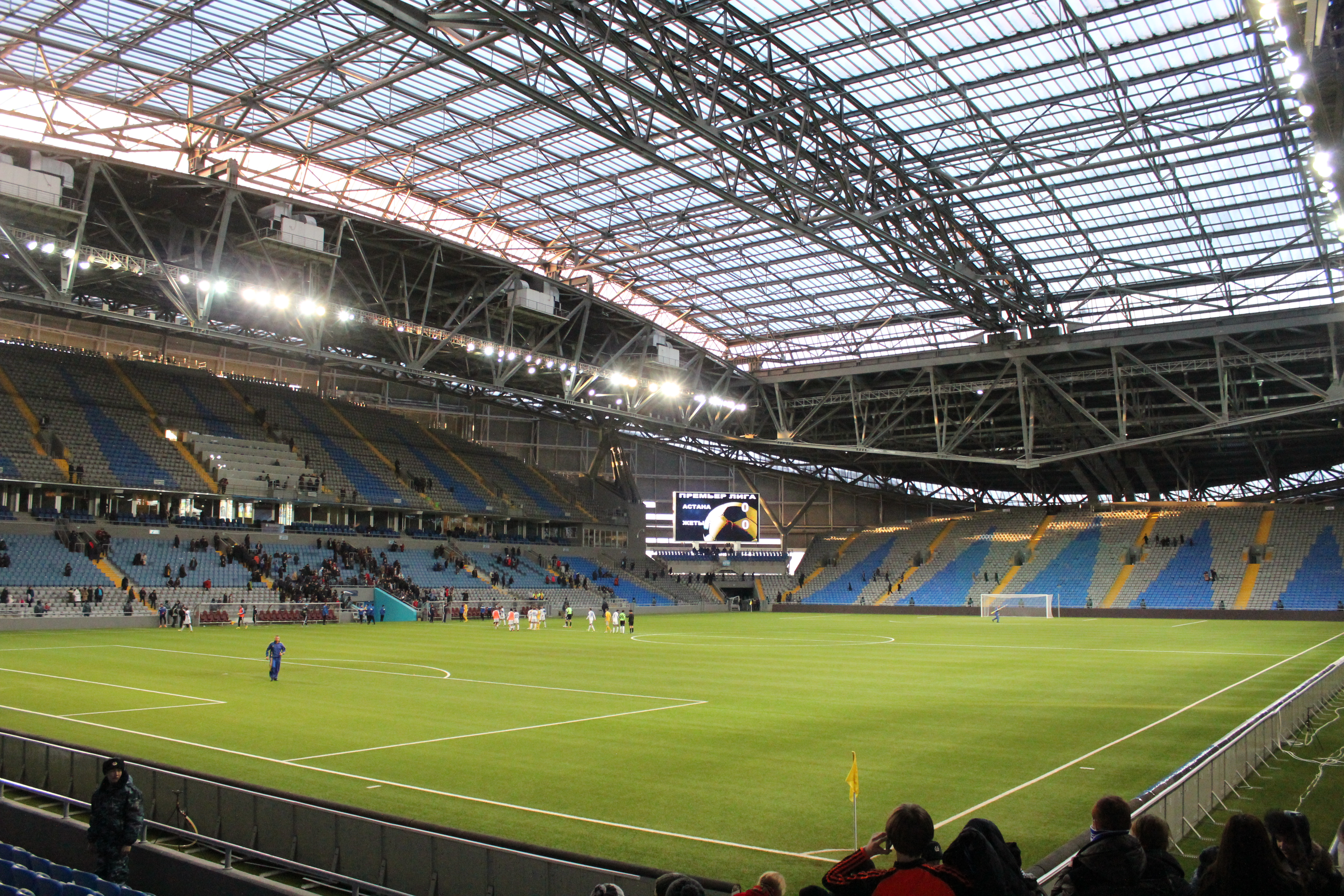
- UEFA
- Interactive map of Astana Arena
- Location: Qabanbay Batyr Avenue, Astana, Kazakhstan
- Coordinates: 51°6′29″N 71°24′9″E
- Owner: City of Astana
- Operator: City of Astana
- Capacity: 30,244
- Surface: Artificial turf
- Record attendance: 30,100 (Kazakhstan-San Marino, 17 November 2023)

Construction
- Opened: 3 July 2009; 17 years ago
- Cost: US$185 million
- Architect: Populous + Tabanlıoğlu Architects
- Structural engineer: Buro Happold
- Main contractor: Sembol Construction

Tenants
- FC Astana; FC Bayterek; Kazakhstan national football team 2011 Asian Winter Games

The Astana Arena (Kazakh: Астана Арена) is a football stadium in Astana, Kazakhstan. The stadium holds 30,000 and has a retractable roof. It serves as the national stadium for the Kazakhstan national football team. Astana Arena is the largest stadium in the country and it was built from 2006 to 2009 at a cost of US$185 million, and was officially opened on 3 July 2009. It is also a home ground for FC Astana of the Kazakhstan Premier League and FC Bayterek of the Kazakhstan First Division. The stadium hosted the opening ceremony of the 7th Asian Winter Games on 31 January 2011. Astana Arena was one of the venues to bid to host UEFA Euro 2020 matches.

== History ==
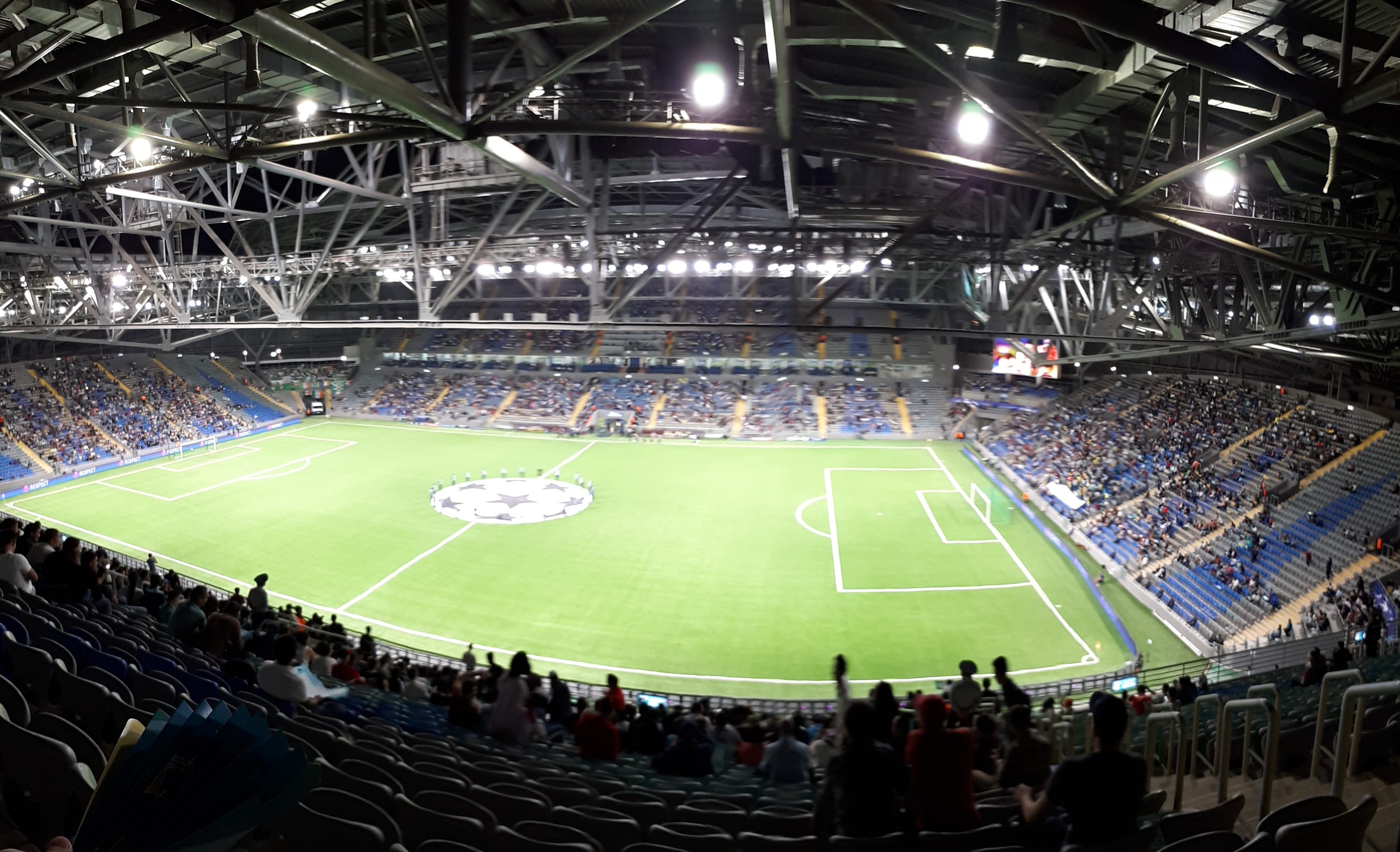
Astana Arena before the UEFA Champions League play-off round match between FC Astana and Celtic F.C.

Construction of the Astana Arena began in 2006 which, on the official opening day, was named Kazhymukan Stadium in honor of the famous wrestler Kazhymukan Munaitpasov. Later, the stadium received its current name Astana Arena. The stadium was designed by leading sports architects Populous in association with Tabanlioglu Architects. The general contractor was Sembol Construction. It was opened with the Lokomotiv Astana match against the Kazakhstan national under-21 football team on 3 July 2009. The famous Italian referee Pierluigi Collina officiated, the symbolic first kick-off was by the President of Kazakhstan Nursultan Nazarbayev. As part of each team, in addition to their regular players, two "stars" were invited: the youth national team of Kazakhstan had the Georgian defender Kakha Kaladze and Ukrainian striker Andriy Shevchenko, and Lokomotiv Astana had Turkish players Hasan Şaş and Hakan Şükür.

On 14 October 2009, the stadium hosted its first official international match: the national team of Kazakhstan met the national team of Croatia as part of the qualifying tournament for the 2010 World Cup. The match was won 2–1 by the guests, the decisive goal was scored only in injury time.

On 31 January 2011, Astana Arena hosted the opening ceremony of the 7th Asian Winter Games and the only Muz-TV Channel Awards held outside Moscow.

On 27 June 2017 and 29 June 2019 world stars Dimash Kudaibergen "Bastau" and "Arnau" performed in concerts which attracted 30,000 and 40,000 spectators. 13,500 spectators from 65 countries attended the "Arnau" concert.

In February 2020, the glass roof inserts collapsed under the load of snow and ice weighing tons; it eventually fell into the hall. No-one was injured.

On 13 and 14 September 2024, the arena hosted 2 concerts, part of Dimash Qudaibergen's Stranger tour

== Characteristics ==
Astana Arena at night

View from the back side

The 30,000-seat stadium was conceived as a large amphitheater with a distinctive and instantly recognizable form when viewed from a distance and from close proximity. Essentially a two·tiered structure, the lower terrace, accommodating 16,000 seats, encircles the playing area while the upper stand on the east and west sides seats a further 14,000 spectators. The design effectively separates VIPs, spectators, and players to ensure smooth access. All spectators are seated and have a clear sightline with an unobstructed view of the field of play. The playing surface is covered in a high quality artificial grass surface specified to meet FIFA and UEFA criteria. The artificial grass can be covered for other events.

== Design ==
The stadium, designed on an elliptic form, is constructed on a 232,485 m^{2} (330m x 704.5m) rectangular site. The design introduces innovative solutions adopting high technology principles for operational management, interaction with the environment and especially with harsh climatic conditions of the geography.

== See also ==
- Football in Kazakhstan
- Lists of stadiums
