= Baitursynov Home Museum =

Museum in Almaty, Kazakhstan

Coordinates: 43°14′36″N 76°55′37″E

- Дом-музей Байтурсынова
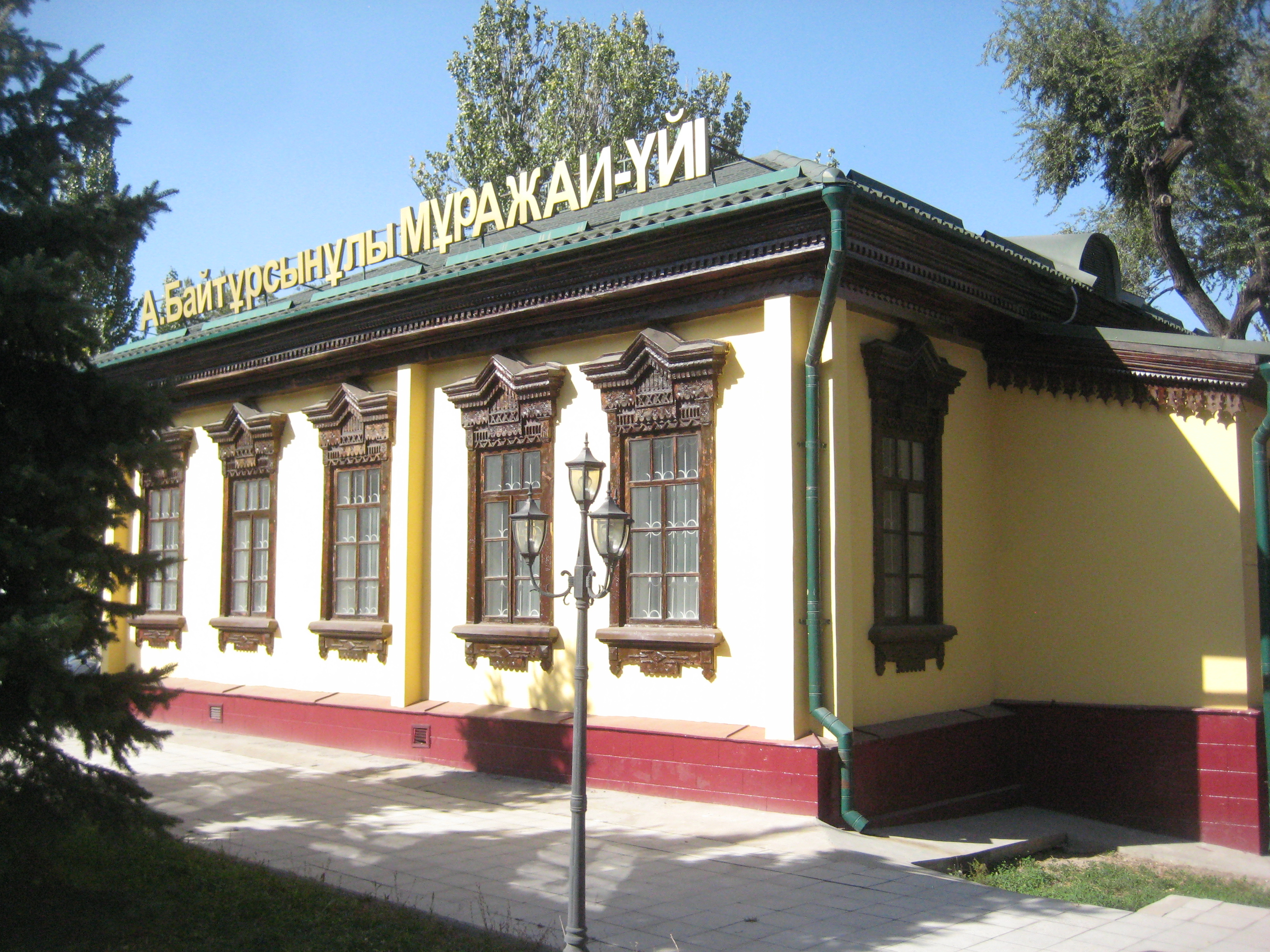
- Akhmet Baitursynov Home Museum
- Established: 1993
- Location: Almaty

Akhmet Baitursynov Home Museum (Kazakh: Ахмет Байтұрсынұлы мұражай-үйі, romanized: Ahmet Baitūrsynūly mūrajai-üiı, Russian: Дом-музей Байтурсынова, tr. dom muzei baitursynova) is a memorial museum of Akhmet Baitursynov in Almaty, Kazakhstan. Museum is located in the house where he lived in 1934–1937.

== Museum exhibition ==
Ahmet Baitursynov and his family lived in the Zubov house in 1934–1937. After the rehabilitation of the former Alash Orda government in 1988, the house was recognized as a historical and architectural monument and in 1993 a memorial house-museum was opened.

The museum exposition occupies three rooms - the former dining room, the children's room and the office of the head of the family. In the two largest and brightest rooms there are originals and photocopies of documents and photos, telling about Baitursynov's family, his friends and associates. The exhibits in the third room, small and dark, are very few; they tell about his arrest and execution.

== Museum building ==
The one-story former Zubov house was built in the early 20th century on Taranchievskaya Street. The main facade of the one-story building, rectangular in plan, is oriented to the west. The entrance is on the south side, highlighted by the porch with a canopy. The building is a log cabin of Tian Shan fir, with a podklet on a stone foundation. The walls are plastered and whitewashed. The planes of the walls are solved by the horizontal rhythm of window openings. A boarded cornice runs along the entire perimeter of the building.

On 12 September 1998, the museum held a grand opening after reconstruction.

== Monument status ==
On 10 November 2010, a new State List of historical and cultural monuments of local importance in the city of Almaty was approved, simultaneously with which all previous decisions on this subject were declared null and void. In this decree, the status of a monument of local importance was retained for the Baitursynov Museum building. The boundaries of the protection zones were approved in 2014.
