= Kazhimukan Munaitpasov Stadium =

Kazhimukan Munaitpasov Stadium may refer to one of the following multi-purpose stadiums in Kazakhstan used mostly for football matches:

- Kazhymukan Munaitpasov Stadium (Astana)
- Kazhymukan Munaitpasov Stadium (Shymkent)
