= Alikhan Bukeikhanov =

Prime minister of Alash Orda (1917–1920)

- Әлихан Бөкейханов
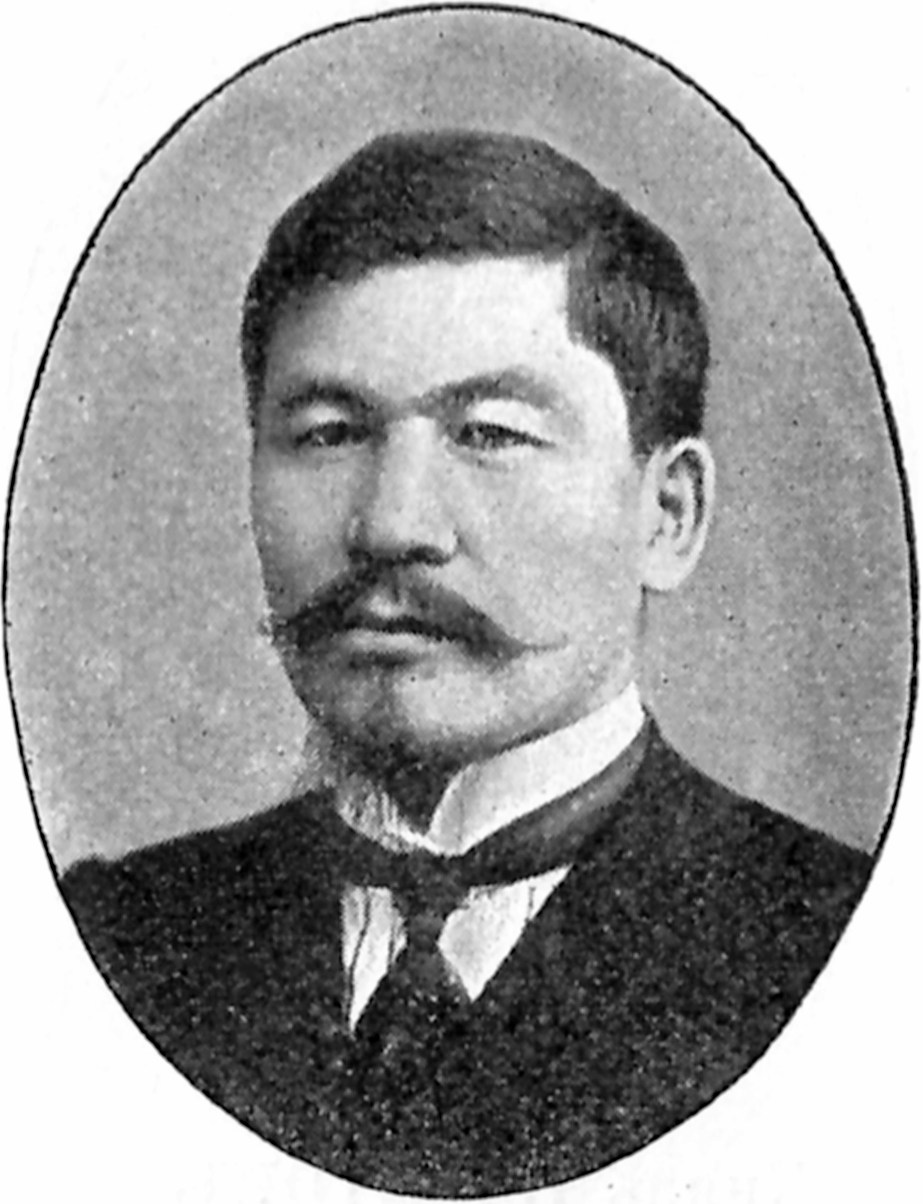
- During the Viborg Manifesto, c. 1907

Chairman of the Alash Orda (Prime Minister of Kazakhstan)
- In office 13 December 1917 – 5 March 1920
- First Minister: Vladimir Volsky (as Chairman of the Committee of Members of the Constituent Assembly); Nikolai Avksentiev (as Chairman of the Provisional All-Russian Government); Pyotr Vologodsky and Viktor Pepelyayev (Note: As Chairman of the Council of Ministers of the Russian State.)
- Supreme Ruler: Alexander Kolchak
- Preceded by: Position established; Nikolai Sukhomlinov (as Governor-General of the Steppes)
- Succeeded by: Position abolished

Additional positions
- 1917–1918: Commissar of the Russian Provisional Government for the Turgay Oblast
- 1906: Member of the State Duma

Personal details
- Born: 5 March 1866 Tokraunskaya Volost, Semipalatinsk Oblast, Russia
- Died: 27 September 1937 (aged 71) Butyrka prison, Moscow, Soviet Union
- Cause of death: Execution by shooting
- Resting place: Novodevichy Cemetery, Moscow
- Party: Alash (1917–1920)
- Other political affiliations: Constitutional Democratic Party (1905–1917)
- Spouse: Yelena Yakovlevna Sevostyanova (m. 1901; died 1918)
- Children: 2
- Education: Omsk Technical School; Saint Petersburg Forestry Institute

Alikhan Nurmukhameduly Bukeikhanov (Note: Kazakh: ءالیحان نوُرموُحامه‌دوُلی ءبوكه‌یحان, Әлихан Нұрмұхамедұлы Бөкейхан, romanized: Älihan Nūrmūhameduly Bökeihan, İske imlâ: علی‌خان نور‌محمد اوغلی بوکیخان, Russian: Алиха́н Нурмухаме́дович Букейха́нов.) (Note: There are several spelling options for the surname: Bukeikhanov (Russian: Букейханов), Bokeikhanov (Kazakh: Бөкейханов) or Bokeikhan (Kazakh: Бөкейхан).) (5 March 1866 – 27 September 1937) was a Kazakh politician, statesman, journalist and publisher who led the Alash party and the provisional government of Alash Orda from 1917 to 1920.

== Early life ==
Alikhan Bukeikhanov was born into a Kazakh Muslim family on 5 March 1866, in Tokyrauyn Volost, Russian Empire. He was the son of Nurmuhammed Bukeikhanov, and, as a great-grandson of Barak Sultan, former khan of the Orta zhuz, he was a direct descendant of Genghis Khan. Bukeikhanov graduated from the Russian-Kazakh School and Omsk Technical School in 1890. He later studied at the Saint Petersburg Forestry Institute, where he graduated from the Faculty of Economics in 1894. During Bukeikhanov's youth, it is believed that he was influenced by socialists.

Upon graduating, Bukeikhanov returned to Omsk and spent the next fourteen years there working. From 1895 to 1897, he worked as a math teacher in the Omsk school for Kazakh children. Bukeikhanov was a participant in the 1896 Shcherbina Expedition, which aimed to research and assess virtually every aspect of Russian Central Asia's environment and resources to the culture and traditions of its inhabitants. This was the first of a few similar missions, which he accepted. Among his recorded contributions were "Ovtsevodstvo v stepnom krae" ("Sheep-Breeding in the Steppe Land"), which analyzed animal husbandry in Central Asia. Bukeikhanov was the first biographer of Abay Kunanbayev, publishing an obituary in Semipalatinsky listok in 1905. In 1909, he published a collection of Kunanbayev's works.

== Political life ==
In 1905, Bukeikhanov's political activism began when he joined the Constitutional Democratic Party. In late 1905 at the Uralsk Oblast Party Congress, he tried to create the Kazakh Democratic Party but failed. As a result of this action, he was arrested and prohibited from living in the Steppe Oblasts. During his exile, he relocated to Samara. He was elected to the State Duma of the Russian Empire as a member of that party in 1906 and signed the Vyborg petition to protest the dissolution of the Duma by the tsar. In 1908, he was arrested again and exiled in Samara until 1917. While in Samara, he participated in the Samara Guberniya Committee of the People's Freedom Party set up in 1915.

=== Author of the idea of the First Kazakh Republic ===
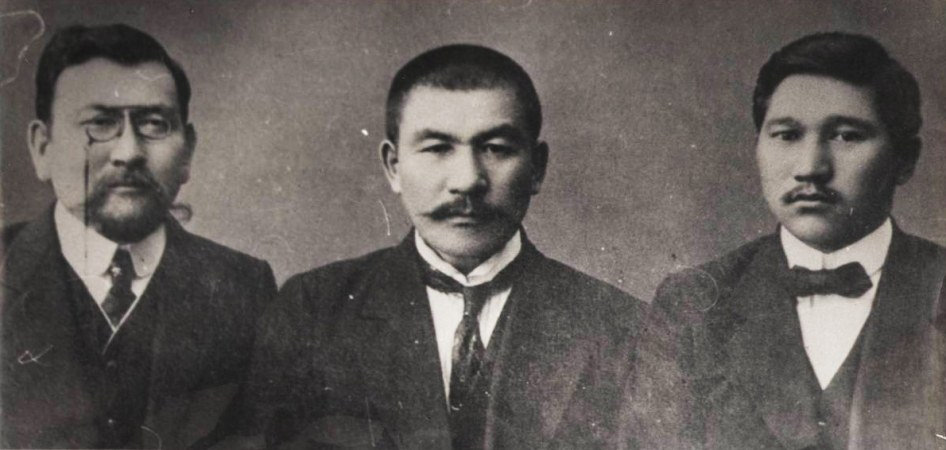
Akhmet Baitursynov, Alikhan Bukeikhanov and Mirjaqip Dulatuli in Orenburg in 1913.

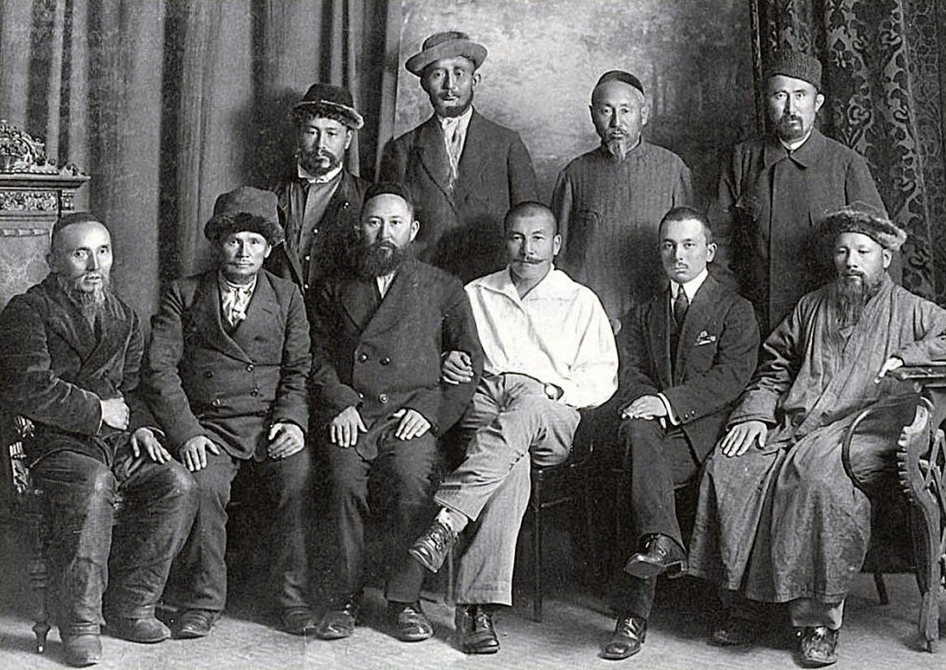
Bukeikhanov among Alash intelligentsia in Semipalatinsk in 1918.

In April 1917, Bukeikhanov, Akhmet Baitursynov and several other native political figures took the initiative to convene an All-Kazakh Congress in Orenburg. In its resolution, Congress urged the return to the native population of all the lands confiscated from it by the previous regime and the expulsion of all the new settlers from the Kazakh-Kirghiz territories. Other resolutions demanded the transfer of the local schools into native hands and the termination of the recruitment introduced in 1916. Within the group, Bukeikhanov, along with Russian liberals, chiefly the Kadets sought to direct attention first to economic problems, whereas others sought to unite the Kazakhs with the other Turkic peoples of Russia.
Three months later, another Kazakh-Kirghiz Congress met in Orenburg. There, for the first time, the idea of territorial autonomy emerged, and a national Kazakh-Kirghiz political party was formed, the Alash Autonomy. Before the February Revolution, Bukeikhanov collaborated with the Kadets in the hope of getting autonomous status for Kazakhs and contacted the head of the Russian Provisional Government Alexander Kerensky. Kerensky proceeded to make Bukeikhanov a commissar. On 19 March 1917, he was appointed as the Provisional Government Commissioner of Turgay Oblast. After the October Revolution, he was elected in 1917 as president of the Alash Orda government of Alash Autonomy.

In 1920, after the establishment of Soviet hegemony, Bukeikhanov joined the Bolshevik Party and returned to scientific life. His earlier political activities caused the authorities to view him with suspicion, leading to arrests in 1926 and 1928. In 1926, Bukeikhanov was arrested on the charge of counter-revolutionary activity and put into the Butyrka prison in Moscow. But due to the lack of evidence in the criminal case against him, he was released from prison. In 1930, the authorities banished him to Moscow, where he was arrested a final time in 1937 and executed.

It was not until 1989 that the Soviet authorities rehabilitated him.

== Writings ==
Bukeikhanov's major political publication was "Kirgizy" ("The Kazakhs") (1910), which was released in the Constitutional Democratic party book on nationalities edited by A. I. Kosteliansky.
Bukeikhanov's other activities of this period included assisting in the creation of Qazaq, a Kazakh language newspaper, and writing articles for newspapers, including "Dala Walayatynyng Gazeti" (Omsk), "Orenburgskii Listok", "Semipalatinskii Listok", "Turkestanskie Vedomosti" (Tashkent), "Stepnoi Pioner" (Omsk), and "Sary-Arqa" (Semipalatinsk). He was also a contributor to Ay Qap and "Sibirskie Voprosy".

== Explanatory notes ==
Political offices
New title State founded	Prime Minister of Alash Autonomy; December 13, 1917 – March 5, 1920	Succeeded by Formation destroyed
