= Alash (party) =

Alash Алаш партиясы
- Logo of the newspaper "Qazaq"
- Leader: Alikhan Bukeikhanov
- Founded: 1917
- Dissolved: 1920
- Split from: Constitutional Democratic Party
- Headquarters: Alash-Qala, Alash Autonomy
- Ideology: Constitutionalism; Nationalism; Anti-communism; Anti-Sovietism
- Political position: Centre to centre-right
- Colors: White, yellow, red

Alash (Kazakh: Алаш партиясы, Alaş partiası) was a political party and liberation movement in the Russian Republic and Soviet Russia, and the ruling party of Alash Autonomy on the territory of present-day Kazakhstan and Russia. They advocated for equal treatment between Kazakhs and Russians and the cessation of Russian settlement on the Kazakh lands. It was notably the first modern organized political Kazakh and Kyrgyz elite group.

The Alash party attempted to reinforce Kazakh identity rather than embracing Russian identities. Western secularism and ties to the Muslim world were the major dividing issues among the party intelligentsia and the Kazakh elites, through the Russian Civil War.

Chairman of the party and president of the Alash Autonomy was Alikhan Bokeikhanov. Prior to the formation of Alash party, he and other notable members of the party were members of the liberal Constitutional Democratic Party, which they maintained some relations with.

Alash party ceased to exist on 26 August 1920, after the Bolsheviks defeated the White Army that was occupying the territory of the Alash Autonomy, and formed the Kirghiz Autonomous Socialist Soviet Republic.

== Etymology ==
The word "Alash" means tribesman or relative in Turkic languages, but according to some sources, Alash may be used as a synonym to "Kazakh". Qadyrgali Jalaiyr - Kazakh chronicler and politician, often used Alash as the word to replace Kazakh.

The party had plans to unite all Turkic peoples of Central Asia and create an independent state. For that they didn't want Kazakhs to be titular nation, so they decided to choose the word Alash, creating a new Turkic identity between nations. However, this plan didn't work out. Kazakh politician Mustafa Shokay commented the first congresses of Alash: "Congress became a symbolic scene to show our unity, by common goal to unite great Turkic peoples".

== History ==
=== Formation and Existence of Party ===
The Alash Party was founded in December 1917, with its creation announced in the weekly newspaper Qazaq. Alash won elections in most regions of Kazakhstan, de facto founding the Alash Autonomy.

The party was founded by former members of the Constitutional Democratic Party, thus making the party one of the successors of the Constitutional Democrats.

After the February Revolution, Russia was weakened, and Kazakh elites used the moment to found a party. An all-Kazakh congress in Orenburg from 21 to 28 July 1917, was organized and main questions were answered such as Russia's form of government, which they decided that Russia should become a federal parliamentary republic.

=== Alash during the Kazakh ASSR ===
The Alash party ceased to exist on 26 August 1920, after the Bolsheviks defeated White Army forces that were Alash Autonomy, and formed the Kirghiz Autonomous Socialist Soviet Republic. However, Kazakh elites decided to continue working to improve Kazakhstan. Some former Alash members joined the Communist Party of the Soviet Union.

Former Alash members started translating textbooks for schools. During the Asharshylyk, the Kazakh elites engaged in large protests against the Soviet political system, criticizing propaganda and the censorship of information on the famine. They wrote two letters to the Soviet government: First "The letter of five" written on 4 July 1932, by Gabit Musirepov, Mansur Gataulin, Embergen Altynbekov, Mutash Dauletkaliev and Kadir Kuanyshev. Second "The letter to J. V. Stalin", a letter written by Turar Ryskulov to Joseph Stalin.

In the 1930s, most the elites were arrested during the Great Purge and sent to Gulags for alleged support of nationalistic ideas. Intolerable prison conditions and constant stress made the detained age faster, which is visible in the last photos of them. In the period of 1935-1938 most of the Kazakh elite was shot.

== Legacy ==
After Kazakhstan gained independence, many figures associated with the party were rehabilitated and monuments constructed to honour them.

On 4 July 2021, a monument dedicated to the Alash movement leaders Akhmet Baitursynov, Alikhan Bukeikhanov and Mirzhakip Dulatov was unveiled in Astana.

== See also ==
- Akhmet Baitursynov
- Alash Orda
- Basmachi movement
- Ismail Gasprinski
- Jadid
- Pan-Turkism
- Ush Zhuz
