= Kazhymukan Munaitpasov =

Kazakh wrestler (1871–1948)

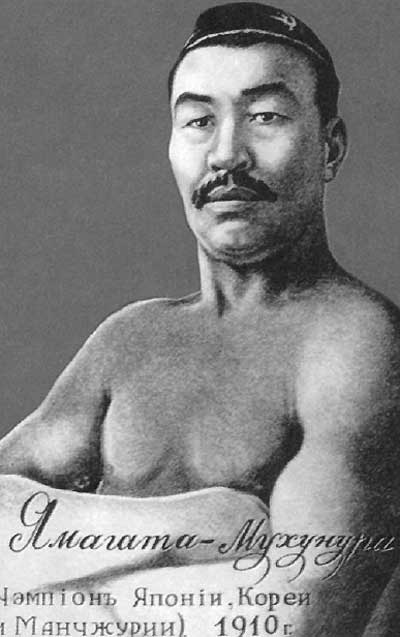
Kajymukan Munaitpasov

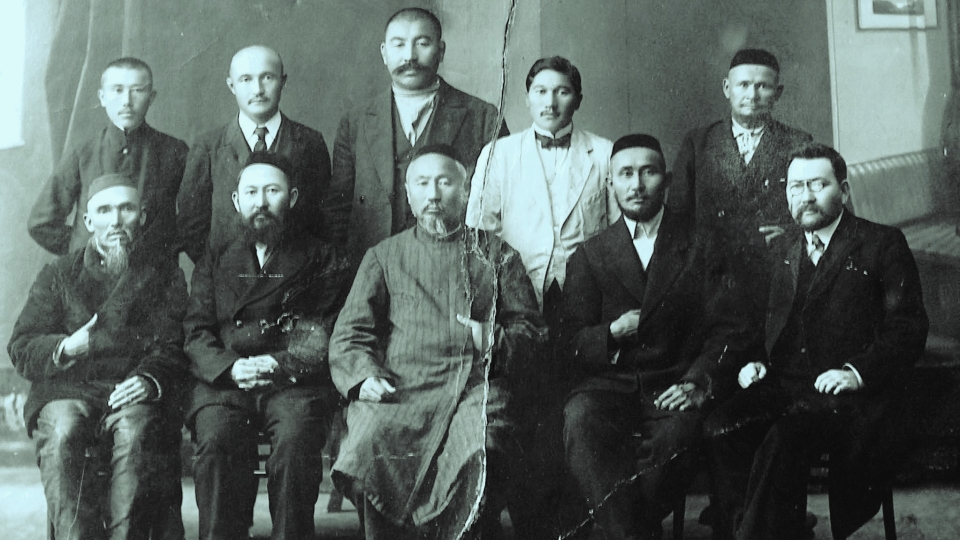
Munaitpasov (Center, back row) along with other famous Kazakh intellectuals like Akhmet Baitursynov and Mirjaqip Dulatuli in Omsk in 1918

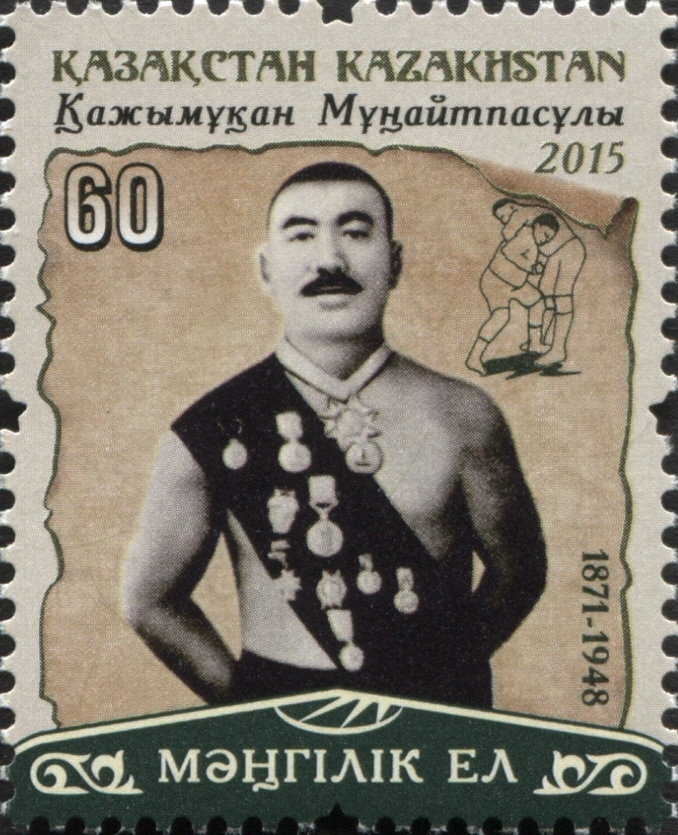
Kajymukan Munaitpasov on a 2016 stamp of Kazakhstan

Kazhymukan Munaitpasov (Kazakh: Қажымұқан Мұңайтпасұлы, Qajymūqan Mūñaitpasūly; Russian: Хаджимукан Мунайтпасов 7 April 1871 – 12 August 1948) was a Kazakh wrestler, strongman and circus performer. He was the first Kazakh world champion in Greco-Roman wrestling, winning titles across Europe and the Americas.

== Early life ==
Born in the village of Karaotkel (Akmola region), Munaitpasov hailed from a poor farming family with a lineage famed for their strength, from grandfather Ernak to father Munaitpas Ernakuly. He learned the traditional Kazakh wrestling style qazaqsha Kures from his grandfather and became known for feats of strength, such as hauling a cart through a blizzard.

== Wrestling and circus career ==
In 1891 he joined a circus troupe in Omsk, working in stables and learning performance arts. His first recorded match was a loss to Andrei Zlobin, who then recommended he train at Lebedev’s wrestling school in St. Petersburg from 1903–1904. He fought in 54 countries, under aliases such as "Yamagata Muhanura" pretending to be former guard of the Emperor of Japan (representing Manchuria), "Ivan Black", for being part of the circus team "Four Ivans", along with the other famous wrestler Ivan Poddubny, "Red Mask", "Kara Mustafa" during his much at Turkey and after his pilgrimage to Mecca in 1912, the honorific "Haji".

=== Major achievements ===
- World Champion in Greco-Roman wrestling (1909, 1911, 1913–1914) in Cologne, Gothenburg, Warsaw, and Paris.
- Gold medal in Buenos Aires (1910); defeated Japanese jiu-jitsu master Harakiki Jindofu.

== Later life ==
A committed patriot, during WWII he raised over 100,000 rubles by performing in Kazakh villages, funding a Po-2 aircraft for the Red Army. He also helped found Kazakhstan’s first national theater in Kyzylorda in 1925. He died in poverty in 1948 at Leninskoe Znamya kolkhoz which was later named after him, leaving several children from four marriages.
