= Qazaq (newspaper) =

1913–1918 Kazakh-language weekly journal

Qazaq (قازاق)
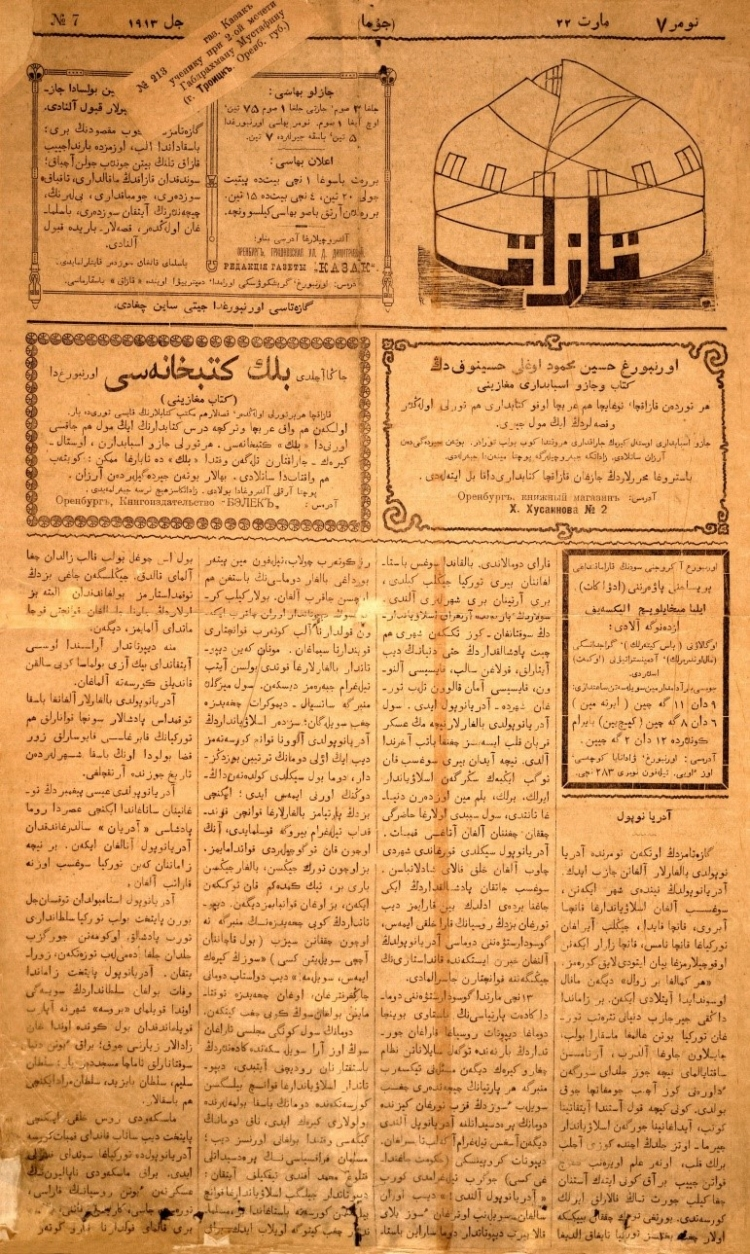
- The seventh issue of the newspaper "Kazakh" dated March 22, 1913.
- Type: Weekly newspaper
- Format: Broadsheet
- Publisher: Partnership "Azamat"
- Editor-in-chief: Akhmet Baitursynov
- Founded: February 2, 1913
- Ceased publication: September 26, 1918
- Language: Kazakh
- City: Orenburg
- Country: Alash Autonomy

Qazaq (Kazakh: Қазақ, قازاق) was a Kazakh language weekly newspaper started by Akhmet Baitursynov (editor in chief), Alikhan Bukeikhanov and Mirjaqip Dulatuli.

Qazaq was published from 1913 until March 1918, when it was shut down by the Soviet government. Influenced by other Jadid periodicals, Qazaq was considered to be a medium promoting the emerging Kazakh nationalism against Tsarist imperial policies. Qazaq published articles on the Kazakh culture, colonization of lands by Russian settlers, taxation issues, educational issues, pros and cons of Kazakh nomadic life and ongoing settlements etc. The founders of Qazaq newspaper wanted to introduce western style reforms to the Kazakh lands as a first step in the gradual progress of Kazakh people towards autonomy and independence.

Influenced by Western scientific and cultural achievements, contributors to the Qazaq newspaper wanted to introduce similar reforms to the nomadic Kazakhs. They thought nomadic life style is backward, and Kazakhs should sedenterize in order to resist Russian imperial policies, which were dislocating the nomadic life style. Although Soviet historians considered Qazaq as conservative, the newspaper had a strong reformist, progressive agenda. Both the Qazaq and Ay Qap were in favour of sedenterization, literacy, and westernization.

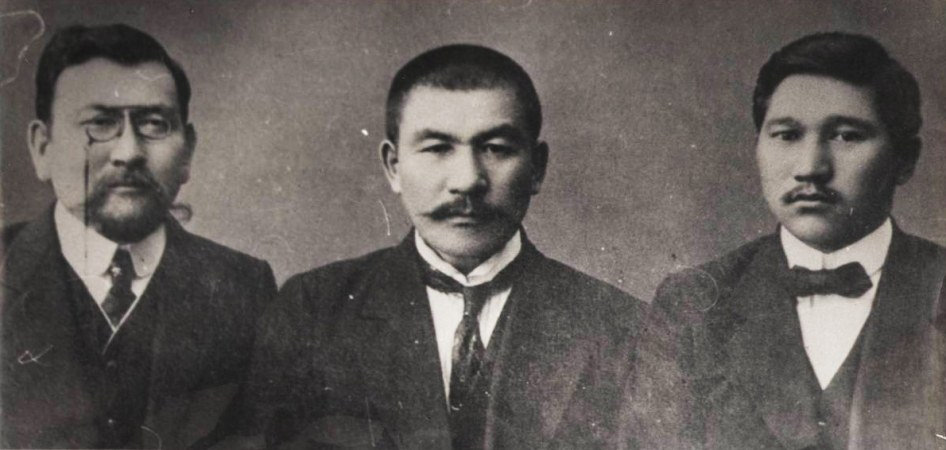
Founders of Qazaq newspaper — Baitursynov, Bokeikhanov and Dulatov.

Those who favoured more western-style reforms contributed to Qazaq, while those who favoured Middle Eastern cultures as a model published Ay Qap at about the same time. Both periodicals wanted to realize autonomy and independence for Kazakhs, and they both envisioned reformation of Kazakh culture as a precondition for gradual realization of these goals.
