= Ay Qap =

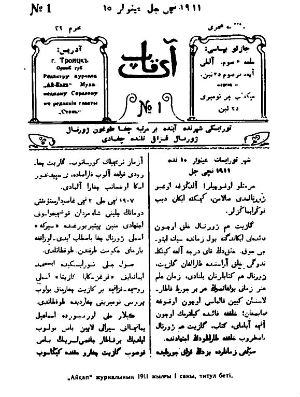
- First issue of Ay Qap from January 1911.
- Editor-in-chief: Mūhammedjan Seralin
- Founded: 1911; 115 years ago
- Ceased publication: 1915; 111 years ago
- Language: Kazakh
- City: Troitsk

Ay Qap (Kazakh: آی قاپ in Arabic script, Айқап or Aiqap in modern scripts) was a Kazakh journal of opinion and debate published in Troitsk from January 1911 until September 1915 under the editorship of Mūhammedjan Seralin.

== Ideological orientation ==
The journal brought together well-known nationalists and reformists, progressivist thinkers and scholars, educators and writers, such as Ahmed Baytursınulı, Älikhan Bökeikhanov, Mir Yaqub Dulatūly, Mäşhür Jüsip Köpeev, Muhammedjan Jūmabayev, Beiımbet Mailin and many others. Articles focused mainly on questions related to the modernisation of the Kazakh customary society, Russian politics, land redistribution and educational issues. It also published a lot on Kazakh language and literature. Along with Qazaq (published between 1913 and 1918), Ay Qap played an important role in the development of the intellectual and political life among early 20th century Kazakhs.

== Funding ==
The magazine was founded with the support of the Yaushev merchant family from Troitsk. Subsequently, it relied fully on sales and subscriptions (in 1912, one issue sold approx. 1000 copies). Issued at first monthly and then twice a month (in 1913 and 1914), it published eighty-eight issues (twelve in 1911, fourteen in 1912, twenty-four in 1913 and 1914, fourteen in 1915). Publication was stopped because of financial problems and political pressure.

== Arabic script ==
The journal was printed in the Kazakh Arabic script, which was the official script for the Kazakh language until 1929. The language displays features common to the literary language in use at that time among Central Asian and Volga intellectuals mixed with more typically Kazakh elements.

== Reprint in the 1990s ==
The original articles have been recently reprinted in Cyrillic script (with a substantial adaptation to modern standard Kazakh language) with a thematic index and a general introduction (Субханбердина ж. б., 1995).

== See also ==
A weekly Internet journal whose slogan clearly evokes the historical Ay Qap is currently being published under the same name: Айқап. Қоғамдық-саяси апталық.
