= Kazakh alphabets =

A 1902 Kazakh text in both Arabic and Cyrillic script.

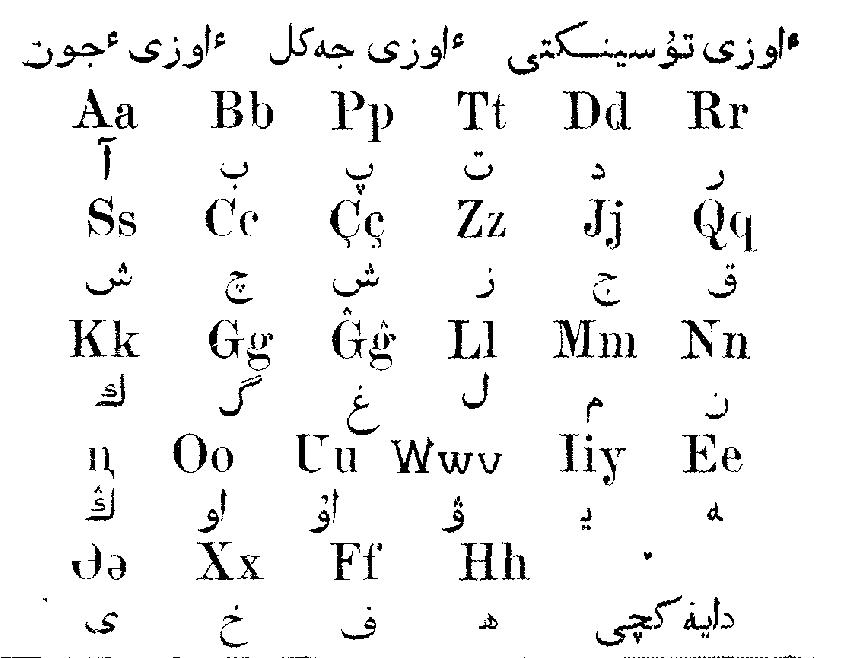
Arabic and Latin script Kazakh alphabets in 1924

The Kazakh language has been written mainly in four scripts at various points of time—Old Turkic, Cyrillic, Latin, and Arabic—each having a distinct alphabet. The Arabic script is used in Iran, Afghanistan, and China, while the Cyrillic script is used in Kazakhstan, Kyrgyzstan, Russia, and Mongolia. In October 2017, a presidential decree in Kazakhstan ordered a transition from the Cyrillic to Latin script to be implemented by 2025. In January 2021, the target year for finishing the transition was pushed back to 2031. In September 2026, all target deadlines were removed as spelling rules continue to be refined.

== History ==
During the Soviet era, the majority use of the Arabic script was first replaced by a new Latin-based script, before being abruptly switched to a Cyrillic-based script just decades later.

In an effort to consolidate its national identity, Kazakhstan started a phased transition from the Cyrillic alphabet to the Latin alphabet in 2017. The Kazakh government drafted a seven-year process until the full implementation of the new alphabet, sub-divided into various phases.

== Cyrillic script ==
Kazakh Cyrillic alphabet
| А а | Ә ә | Б б | В в | Г г | Ғ ғ | Д д |
| Е е | Ё ё | Ж ж | З з | И и | Й й | К к |
| Қ қ | Л л | М м | Н н | Ң ң | О о | Ө ө |
| П п | Р р | С с | Т т | У у | Ұ ұ | Ү ү |
| Ф ф | Х х | Һ һ | Ц ц | Ч ч | Ш ш | Щ щ |
| Ъ ъ | Ы ы | І і | Ь ь | Э э | Ю ю | Я я |

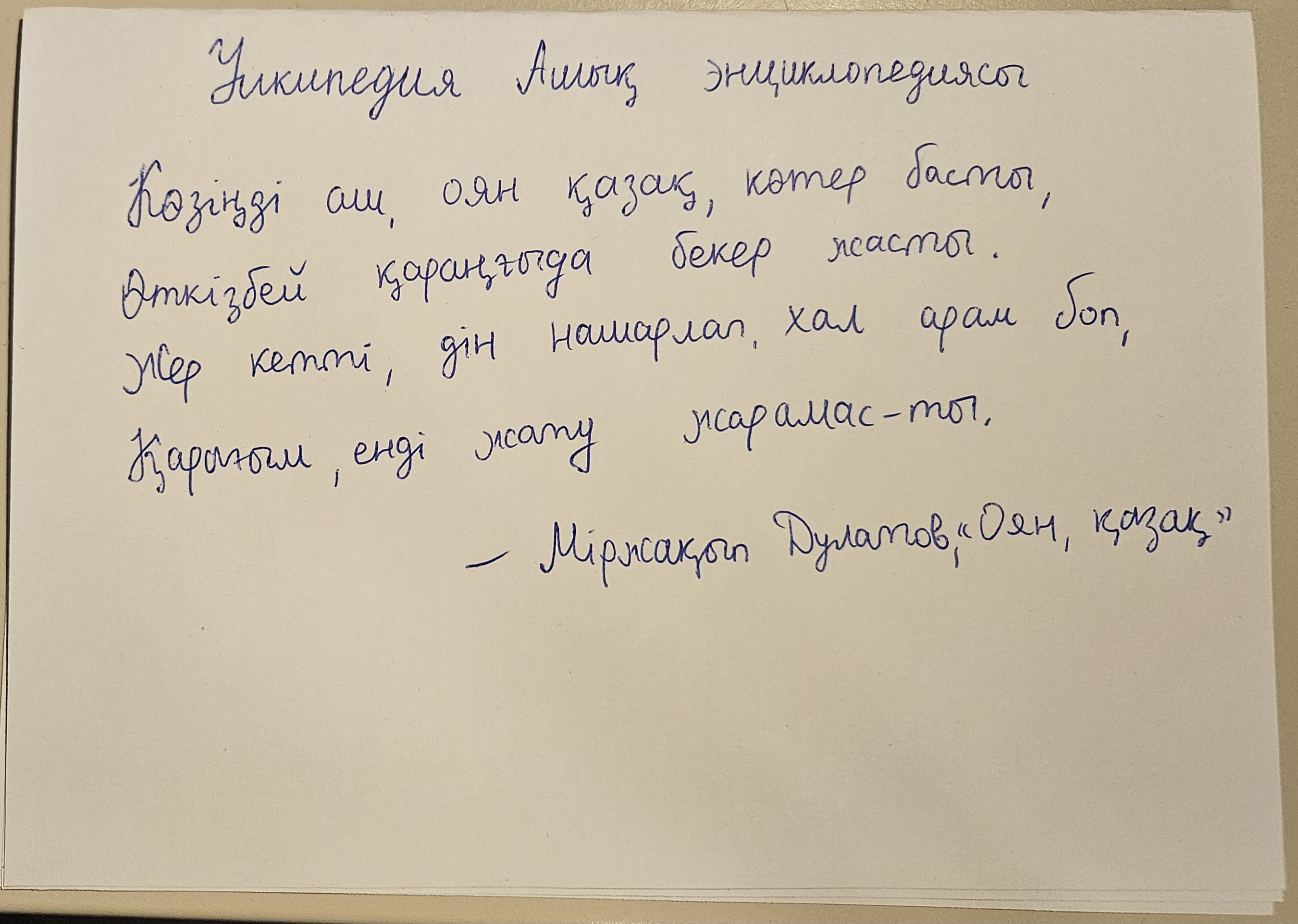
The Kazakh-language poem "Oyan, Qazaq" by Mirjaqip Dulatuli in Cursive Cyrillic

The Kazakh Cyrillic alphabet is used in Kazakhstan, the Altai Republic in Russia, and the Bayan-Ölgiy Province in Mongolia. It is also used by Kazakh populations in Kyrgyzstan, Russia, Turkmenistan, and Uzbekistan, as well as by diasporas in other countries of the former USSR. It was introduced during the Russian Empire period in the 1800s and later adapted by the Soviet Union in 1940.

In the 19th century, the Kazakh educator Ibrahim Altynsarin first introduced a Cyrillic alphabet for transcribing Kazakh. Russian missionary activity, as well as Russian-sponsored schools, further encouraged the use of Cyrillic between the 19th and early 20th centuries. The alphabet was reworked by Sarsen Amanzholov and was accepted in its current form in 1940. It contains 42 letters: 33 from the Russian alphabet, with 9 additional letters for sounds not found in Russian: ⟨ә, ғ, қ, ң, ө, ұ, (Note: Until 1951 ⟨ӯ⟩ was used instead of ⟨ұ⟩.) ү, һ, і⟩. Initially, Kazakh letters came after Cyrillic letters shared with the Russian alphabet, but now they are placed after Cyrillic letters based on similar sound or shape.

The letters ⟨в, ё, (Note: Since 1957.) ф, ц, ч, ъ, ь, э⟩ are not used in native Kazakh words; of these, ⟨ё, ц, ч, ъ, ь, э⟩ are used solely in Russian loanwords. Owing to Russian influence on Kazakh phonology, ⟨е⟩ palatalises the preceding consonant and is pronounced as /je/. The letter ⟨һ⟩ is usually found in Perso-Arabic loanwords and is often pronounced as /h/, a non-native phoneme. In rapid conversation, ⟨қ⟩ can be pronounced like ⟨х⟩ intervocalically or when preceding stop consonants. The letter ⟨щ⟩ represents a long ⟨ш⟩ in three native words: ащы [ɑʃːə́] ('bitter'), тұщы [tʰʊ̆ʃːʊ́] ('saltless'), and кеще [cʰĕɕːé] ('stupid'), as well as in Russian loanwords.

The letter ⟨и⟩ represents the diphthongs /əj/ (⟨ый⟩) in back-vowel words and /ɘj/ (⟨ій⟩) in front-vowel words. Similarly, ⟨у⟩ represents the glide /w/ next to vowels to form diphthongs, and the tense vowel /u/ between consonants. However, unlike ⟨и⟩, ⟨у⟩ as the infinitive marker in Kazakh verbs can be pronounced as /ʊw/ (⟨ұу⟩), /ʉw/ (⟨үу⟩), /əw/ (⟨ыу⟩), and /ɘw/ (⟨іу⟩), depending on the preceding vowels in the verb stem. Additionally, the pronunciation of ⟨и⟩ and ⟨у⟩ is retained in Russian loanwords, representing /ˈi/ and /ˈu/ in stressed positions and /ɪ/ and /ʊ/ in unstressed positions, respectively.

=== Keyboard ===
The standard Windows keyboard layout used for Cyrillic Kazakh in Kazakhstan is a modification of the standard Russian keyboard, with characters found in Kazakh but not in Russian located on the number keys.

The Kazakh keyboard.

=== Romanization ===
Prior to official Latin-alphabet developments in Kazakhstan, the Kazakh Cyrillic alphabet was romanised for accessibility to readers familiar with the Latin alphabet using the following systems:

- ALA-LC romanization (American Library Association and Library of Congress), 1940 system, commonly used in English-language bibliographic cataloguing and in academic publishing.
- BGN/PCGN romanization (US Board on Geographic Names and Permanent Committee on Geographical Names for British Official Use), 1979 system, commonly used in place names and mapping.
- ISO 9:1995 (International Organization for Standardization), 1995, an international system based on central European orthography that uses a single unique character for each letter.

| Cyrillic letter | ALA-LC | BGN/PCGN | ISO 9:1995 | English approximation |
|---|---|---|---|---|
| А а | A a | A a | A a | Bravo |
| Ә ә | Ă ă | Ä ä | A̋ a̋ | Cat |
| Б б | B b | B b | B b | Bear |
| В в | V v | V v | V v | Vulture |
| Г г | G g | G g | G g | Goal |
| Ғ ғ | Gh gh | Gh gh | Ġ ġ | Not present in Standard English words; Rouge in French language. |
| Д д | D d | D d | D d | Deer |
| Е е | E e | E e | E e | Elk |
| Ё ё | Ë ë | Ë ë | Ë ë | Yogurt |
| Ж ж | Zh zh | Zh zh | Ž ž | Vision/Jellyfish |
| З з | Z z | Z z | Z z | Zinc |
| И и | I i | Ī ī | I i | Bee |
| Й й | Ĭ ĭ | Y y | J j | Yes |
| К к | K k | K k | K k | King |
| Қ қ | Q q | Q q | Ķ ķ | Not present in Standard English words; Qur'an in Arabic languages. |
| Л л | L l | L l | L l | Lion |
| М м | M m | M m | M m | Mare |
| Н н | N n | N n | N n | Nest |
| Ң ң | N͡g n͡g | Ng ng | Ņ ņ | Bring |
| О о | O o | O o | O o | Olden |
| Ө ө | Ȯ ȯ | Ö ö | Ô ô | Not present in Standard English words; Cheval in French language. |
| П п | P p | P p | P p | Panther |
| Р р | R r | R r | R r | (Trilled 'Rr' present in some English accents) Rock |
| С с | S s | S s | S s | Scorpion |
| Т т | T t | T t | T t | Tiger |
| У у | U u | Ū ū | U u | Moon/Whale |
| Ұ ұ | Ū ū | U u | U̇ u̇ | Hook |
| Ү ү | U̇ u̇ | Ü ü | Ù ù | Brute |
| Ф ф | F f | F f | F f | Falcon |
| Х х | Kh kh | Kh kh | H h | Not present in Standard English words; Loch in Scottish accent. |
| Һ һ | Ḣ ḣ | H h | Ḥ ḥ | Hat |
| Ц ц | T͡s t͡s | Ts ts | C c | Artsy |
| Ч ч | Ch ch | Ch ch | Č č | Champion |
| Ш ш | Sh sh | Sh sh | Š š | Shark |
| Щ щ | Shch shch | Shch shch | Ŝ ŝ | Fresh cheese |
| Ъ ъ | ʺ | ʺ | ʺ | " silent |
| Ы ы | Y y | Y y | Y y | Not present in Standard English words. Like a Turkish "ı", sounds like "uh", but further back in the mouth. |
| І і | Ī ī | I i | Ì ì | Bitten |
| Ь ь | ʹ | ʹ | ' | ' silent |
| Э э | Ė ė | Ė ė | È è | Café |
| Ю ю | I͡u i͡u | YU yu | Û û | You |
| Я я | I͡a i͡a | YA ya | Â â | Yard |

Since the introduction of the official Kazakh Latin alphabet, romanized place names have been gradually shifting to being rendered in the official Latin alphabet from being rendered in international romanization schemes. This practice can be seen in services like Google Maps.

== Latin script ==
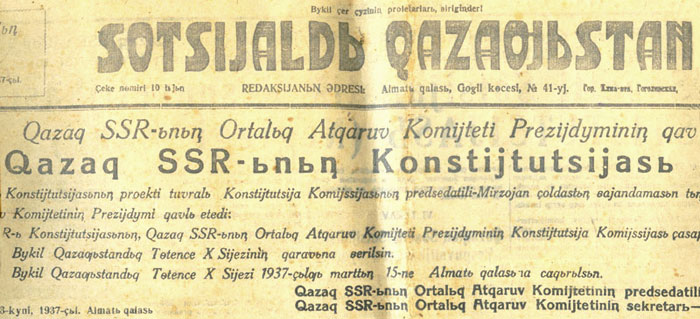
A Kazakh newspaper Socialist Kazakhstan («Социалды Қазағыстан», Sotsialdy Qazağystan) in Latin script (1937)

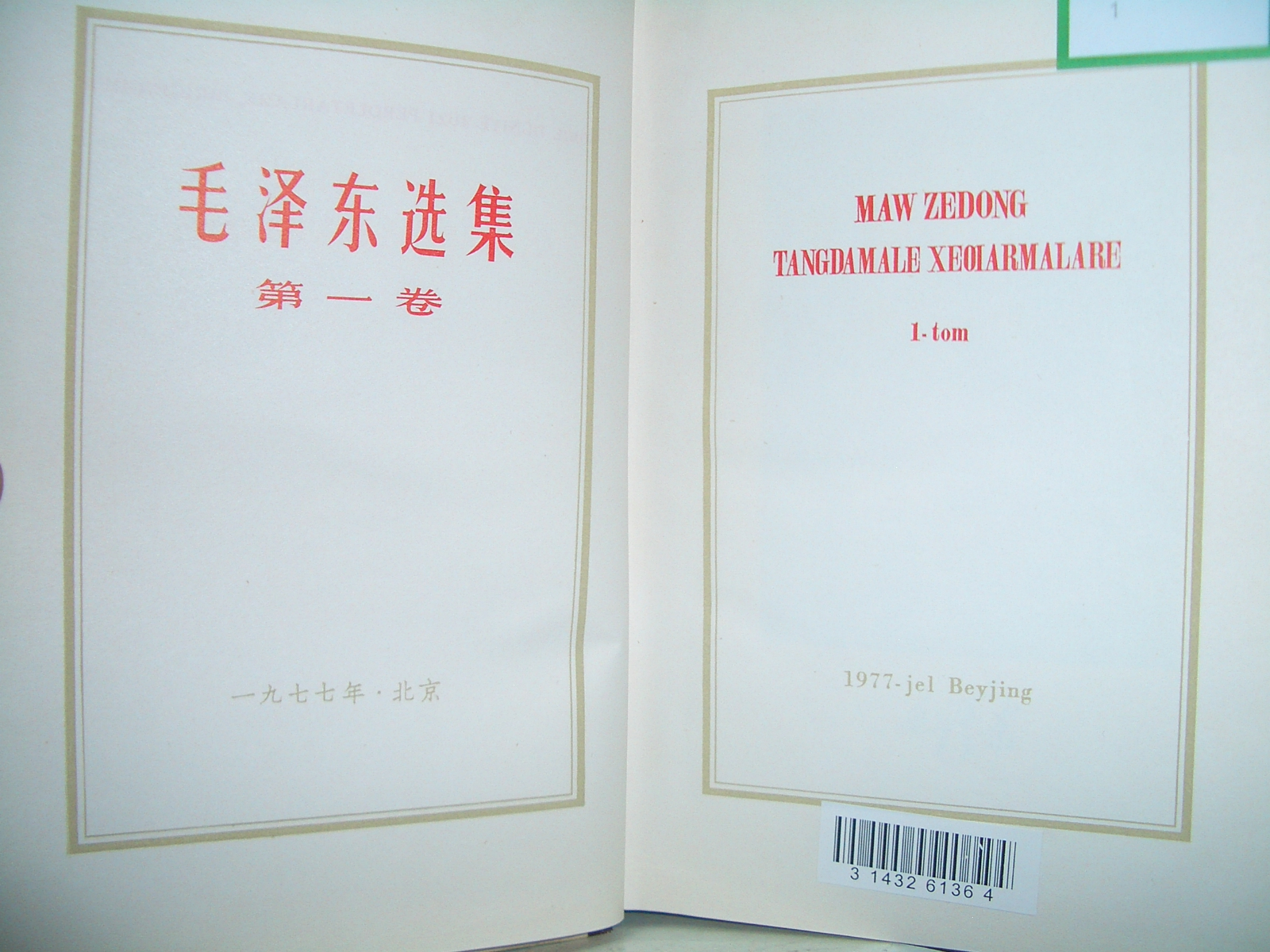
Selected works of Mao Zedong («Мау Зыдоң Таңдамалы Шығармалары», Mau Zıdoꞑ Taꞑdamalı Şığarmaları) in Latin-script Kazakh, published in Beijing in 1977

A number of Latin alphabets are in use to write the Kazakh language. A variant based on the Turkish alphabet is unofficially used by the Kazakh diaspora in Turkey and in Western countries, as well as in Kazakhstan. As with other Central Asian Turkic languages, a Latin alphabet, the Yañalif, was introduced by the Soviets and used from 1929 to 1940, when it was replaced with Cyrillic. Moreover, a Latin alphabet based on Pinyin was used for Kazakhs in China from 1964 to 1984. Later, the use of the Kazakh Arabic alphabet was restored in China.

1929 Latin alphabet (Çaꞑəlip)
| A a | B ʙ | C c | Ç ç | D d | E e | Ə ə | G g | Ƣ ƣ | H h |
| I i | J j | K k | L l | M m | N n | Ꞑ ꞑ | O o | Ɵ ɵ | P p |
| Q q | R r | S s | T t | U u | V v | Y y | Z z | Ь ь | |

1938 Latin alphabet (Çaꞑəljp)
| A a | B ʙ | V v | G g | D d | E e | Ç ç | Z z | I i | J j | K k |
| L l | M m | N n | O o | P p | R r | S s | T t | U u | F f | X x |
| Ƣ ƣ | Q q | C c | Ə ə | H h | Ꞑ ꞑ | Ɵ ɵ | Ū ū | Y y | Ь ь | |

As part of a modernization program, the presidential decree No. 569 signed by President Nursultan Nazarbayev ordered the replacement of the Cyrillic script with a Latin script by 2025. In 2007, Nazarbayev said that the transformation of the Kazakh alphabet from Cyrillic to Latin should not be rushed, as he noted: "For 70 years, the Kazakhstanis read and wrote in Cyrillic. More than 100 nationalities live in our state. Thus we need stability and peace. We should be in no hurry in the issue of alphabet transformation".

In 2015, the Minister of Culture and Sports Arystanbek Muhamediuly announced that a transition plan was underway, with specialists working on the orthography to accommodate the phonological aspects of the language. On 12 April 2017, Nazarbayev published an article in state newspaper Egemen Qazaqstan announcing a switchover to the Latin alphabet by 2025, a decision implemented by decree.

Nazarbayev later lamented that the "Kazakh language and culture have been devastated" during the period of Soviet rule, and that ending the use of Cyrillic is useful in re-asserting national identity. The new Latin alphabet is also a step to weaken the traditional Russian influence on the country, as the Russian language is the country's second official language. The initially proposed Latin alphabet tried to avoid digraphs such as ⟨sh⟩ and diacritics such as ⟨ş⟩. In fact, Nazarbayev had expressly stated that the new alphabet should contain "no hooks or superfluous dots". Instead, this new alphabet would have used apostrophes to denote such letters where there was no direct Latin equivalent. It would have been similar to the Karakalpak and Uzbek alphabets.

A revised version of the 2017 Latin alphabet was announced in February 2018. Presidential Decree 637 of 19 February 2018 amends the 2017 decree and the use of apostrophes was discontinued and replaced with diacritics and digraphs. This new alphabet was noted for the use of acute accents. A few web applications and sites were launched to facilitate the switch to the Latin-based alphabet. One of them is a new web-based portal, Qazlatyn.kz, that uses the new Latin alphabet to report news and other information about Kazakhstan.

=== Latest developments ===
Kazakh Latin alphabet (April 2021)
| A a (А а) | Ä ä (Ә ә) | B b (Б б) | D d (Д д) | E e (Е е) | F f (Ф ф) | G g (Г г) | Ğ ğ (Ғ ғ) |
| H h (Х х, Һ һ) | I ı (І і) | İ i (Й й, И и) | J j (Ж ж) | K k (К к) | L l (Л л) | M m (М м) | N n (Н н) |
| Ñ ñ (Ң ң) | O o (О о) | Ö ö (Ө ө) | P p (П п) | Q q (Қ қ) | R r (Р р) | S s (С с) | Ş ş (Ш ш) |
| T t (Т т) | U u (У у) | Ū ū (Ұ ұ) | Ü ü (Ү ү) | V v (В в) | Y y (Ы ы) | Z z (З з) | |

In 2020, President Kassym-Jomart Tokayev called for another revision of the Latin alphabet with a focus on preserving the original sounds and pronunciation of the Kazakh language. This revision, presented to the public in November 2019 by academics from the Baitursynov Institute of Linguistics, and specialists belonging to the official working group on script transition, uses umlauts, breves and cedillas instead of digraphs and acute accents, and introduces spelling changes in order to reflect more accurately the phonology of Kazakh. This revision deviated only slightly from the Common Turkic Alphabet (CTA), introducing the letter ⟨ŋ⟩ in lieu of ⟨ñ⟩. As this version was awaiting approval, linguists had been in discussion as to which Latin letters were to be used in place of their corresponding Cyrillic letters ⟨ə, ғ, и, й, ң, ɵ, у, ұ, ү, ы, ч, ш, i⟩; a suggested alternative to the introduction of accented characters was to make greater use of digraphs, with ⟨ч⟩ being written as ⟨tş⟩, for example.

In January 2021, a new revision of the Kazakh Latin alphabet was presented, introducing the letters ⟨ä, ö, ü, ğ, ū, ŋ, ş⟩ bringing it closer to the CTA.

A subsequent revision on 22 April further narrowed this gap by replacing ⟨ŋ⟩ with ⟨ñ⟩, which is also used in the Crimean Tatar Latin alphabet. Its presentation to the public was well received. This current Latin script has similarities especially with Turkish, Azerbaijani and Turkmen alphabets.

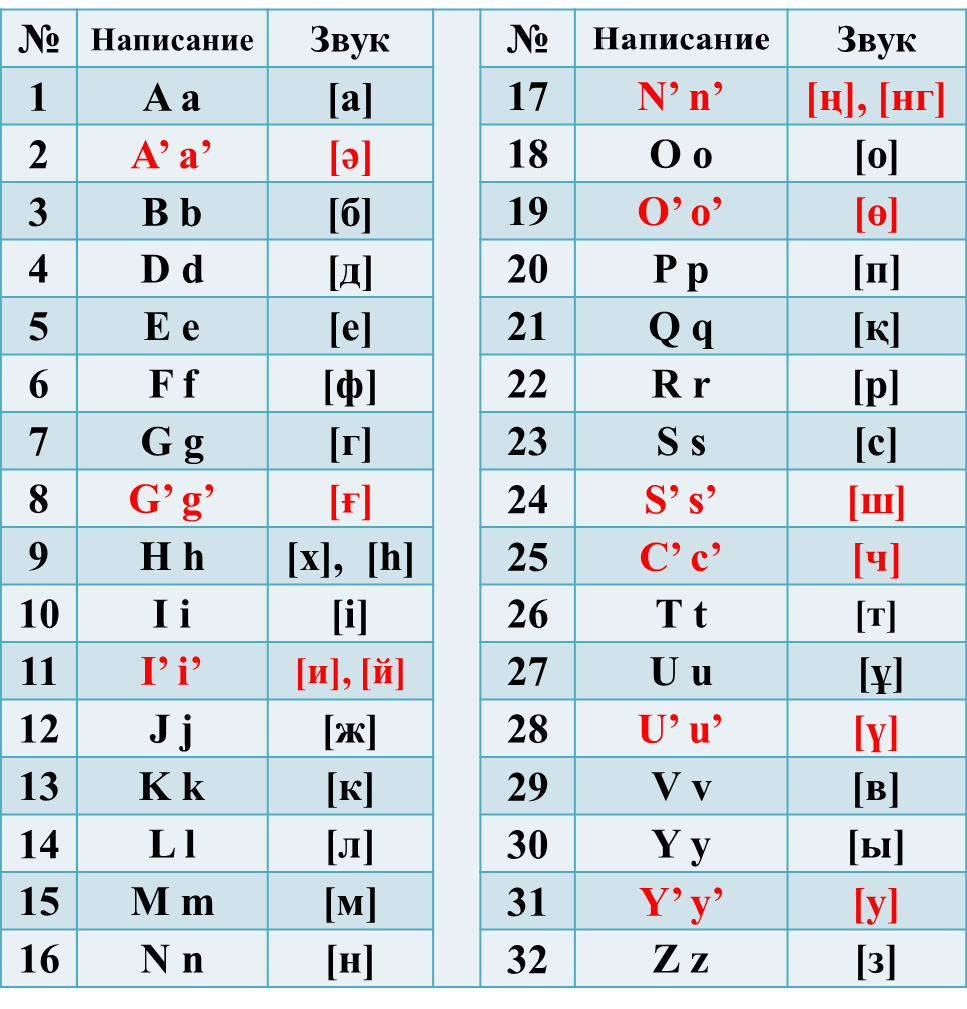
Initial proposed Latin alphabet for the Kazakh language, implemented by Presidential Decree 569 (26 October 2017), later revised by Presidential Decree 637 of 19 February 2018, replacing the apostrophe with diacritics and digraphs

2018 revision of the Kazakh Latin alphabet, used from 2018 to 2022

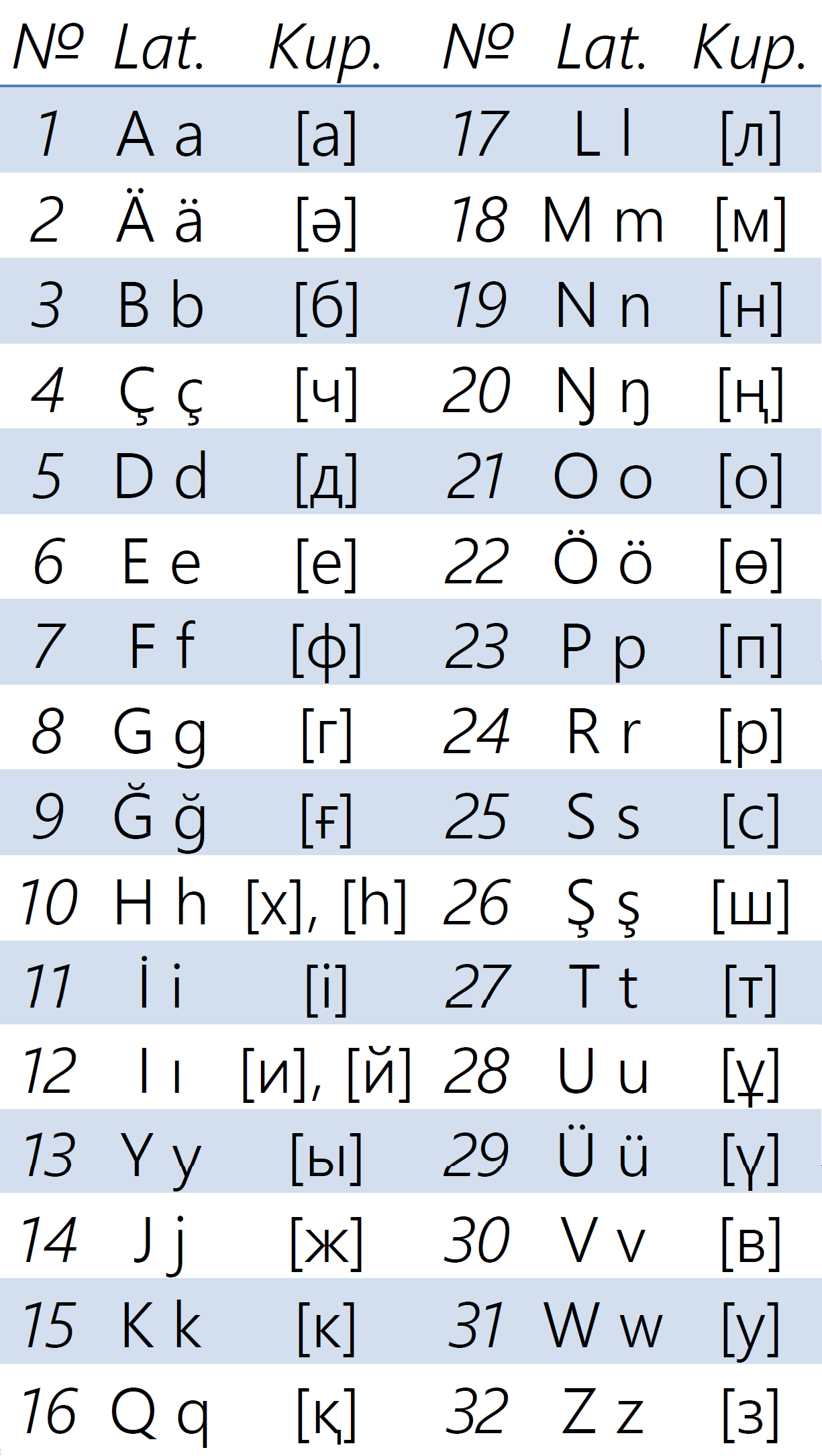
Proposed new version of the Kazakh Latin alphabet presented in 2019

2021 revision of the Kazakh Latin alphabet, officially used starting 2023

== Arabic script ==
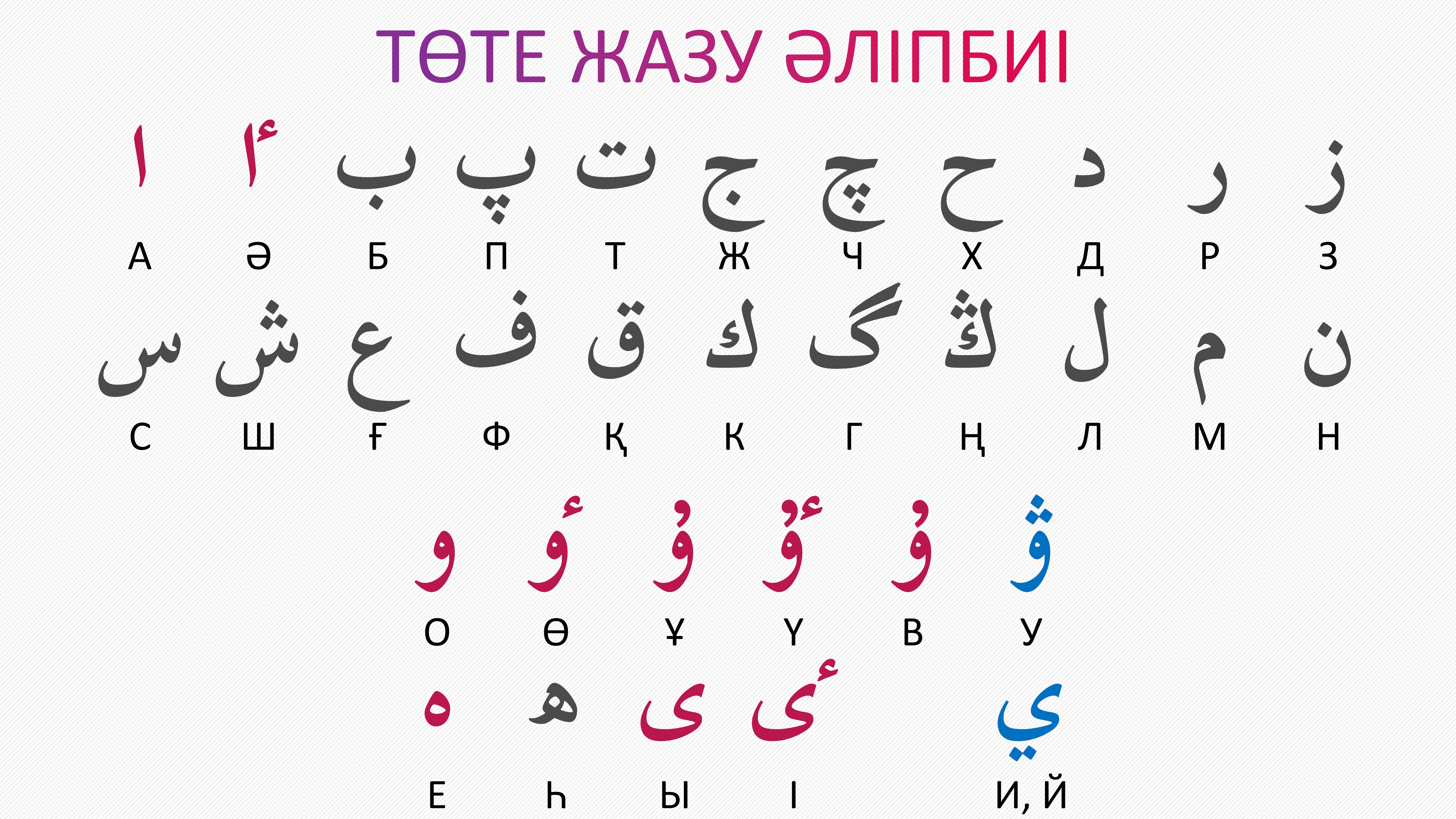
Kazakh Arabic Script as developed by the father of Kazakh linguistics, Akhmet Baitursynov. It is a true alphabet as opposed to the original basic Arabic abjad.

The Perso-Arabic script is the official alphabet for Kazakhs in the Ili Kazakh Autonomous Prefecture of the Xinjiang Uyghur Autonomous Region of China. It was first introduced to the territory of Kazakhstan in the eleventh century and was traditionally used to write Kazakh until the introduction of a Latin alphabet in 1929. In 1924, Kazakh intellectual Akhmet Baitursynov attempted to reform the Arabic script to better suit Kazakh. The letters ۆ, گ, ڭ, پ and چ are used to represent sounds not found in the Arabic language.

A modified Arabic script is also used in Iran and Afghanistan, based on the alphabet used for Kazakh before 1929.

The Kazakh Arabic alphabet contains 29 letters and one digit, the 'upper hamza' used at the beginnings of words to create front vowels throughout the word. The direction the alphabet is written in is right to left. Unlike the original Arabic script, which is an abjad, the Kazakh Arabic script functions more like a true alphabet, as each sound has its own letter and every sound in each word is spelt out in the written form of the language. The reform of the Arabic script from an abjad to an alphabet was carried out by the early 20th-century linguist Akhmet Baitursynov.

Kazakhs living in China, Pakistan, Afghanistan, Iran, and other countries of the Middle East mainly use the Arabic script.

=== Vowels ===
In the Kazakh Arabic alphabet, 9 vowels are defined.

| | | Rounded | | Unrounded | | |
| | | Close | Open | Close | | Open |
|---|---|---|---|---|---|---|
| Back | Arabic | ـۇ / ۇ | ـو / و | ىـ / ـى / ى | | ا / ‍ـا |
| Back | Cyrillic | Ұ ұ | О о | Ы ы | | А а |
| Back | Latin | Ū ū | O o | Y y | | A a |
| Back | IPA | [ʊ] | [o] | [ə] | | [ɑ] |
| Front | Arabic | ٴـۇ / ٴۇ | ٴـو/ ٴو | ٴىـ / ٴـى / ٴى | ە / ـە | ٴا / ‍ٴـا |
| Front | Cyrillic | Ү ү | Ө ө | І і | Е е Э э | Ә ә |
| Front | Latin | Ü ü | Ö ö | I ı | E e | Ä ä |
| Front | IPA | [ʏ]~[y] | [œ] | [ɘ] | [e] | [æ] |

=== Use of hamza ===
The hamza, or "Dayekshe" as it is known, has a unique role in Kazakh, a role not seen in other Arabic alphabets. The Kazakh Arabic alphabet makes use of U+0674 ٴ ARABIC LETTER HIGH HAMZA, and it can only ever come at the beginning of words. It never comes in the middle or end of words. The hamza does not represent any sound in Kazakh; instead, it indicates that the vowels in the word will be the following front vowels:

- Ә ә / Ä ä
- І і / I ı
- Ө ө / Ö ö
- Ү ү / Ü ü

Dagger alif played a similar but inverse role in the Tatar Yaña imlâ alphabet, marking that vowels in a word will be back vowels.

There are exceptions in the Kazakh orthography, such as in front-vowel words without hamza. Words that contain the vowel /e/ (indicated as ە), which itself is classified as a front vowel, automatically indicates that all other vowels are also front; ergo, the hamza is not written. For example, the word түйіс [tyjys] 'knot' is written with the hamza, as ٴتۇيىس; however, in its plural form түйістер [tyjystɵr] 'knots', it is written as تۇيىستەر without the hamza.

Another exception is when words that contain the uvular consonants /q/ (ق) and /ʁ/ (ع), the vowels are pronounced as back and are thus not written with the hamza. In contrast, their velar counterparts /g/ (گ) and /k/ (ک) can only be accompanied by front vowels, and they act as indicators that vowels are front; thus eliminating a need for the hamza. For example, the word түйір [tyjyr] 'granule' is written as ٴتۇيىر, whereas a derivative such as түйіршік [tyjyrʃyk] 'granular' is written as تۇيىرشىك.

Pursuant to these rules, suffixes are formed in pairs as well. For example, words with back vowels take suffixes -лық (‑لىق) / -дық (‑دىق) / -тық (‑تىق), and words with front vowels, take suffixes -лік (‑لىك) / -дік (‑دىك) / -тік (‑تىك).

=== Glyph forms ===
List of Kazakh Arabic script letters
| Transliteration | Name in Kazakh | IPA | Isolated | Final | Medial | Initial |
|---|---|---|---|---|---|---|
| Аа | älıf ٴالىپ | [ɑ] | ا | ـا | | ا |
| Әә | hämzä-älıp ٴحامزا-ٴالىپ | [æ] | ٴا | ٴـا | | ٴا |
| Бб | ba با | [b] | ب | ـب | ـبـ | بـ |
| Пп | pa پا | [p] | پ | ـپ | ـپـ | پـ |
| Тт | ta تا | [t] | ت | ـت | ـتـ | تـ |
| Жж | jim جيم | [ʑ] | ج | ـج | ـجـ | جـ |
| Чч | ha üş noqat حا ٴۇش نوقات | [t͡ɕ] | چ | ـچ | ـچـ | چـ |
| Хх | xa حا | [χ~q] | ح | ـح | ـحـ | حـ |
| Дд | däl ٴدال | [d] | د | ـد | | د |
| Рр | ra را | [r] | ر | ـر | | ر |
| Зз | zain زاين | [z] | ز | ـز | | ز |
| Сс | sin سين | [s] | س | ـس | ـسـ | سـ |
| Шш | şin شين | [ɕ] | ش | ـش | ـشـ | شـ |
| Ғғ | ain اين | [ɢ~ʁ] | ع | ـع | ـعـ | عـ |
| Фф | fa فا | [f] | ف | ـف | ـفـ | فـ |
| Ққ | qaf قاف | [q] | ق | ـق | ـقـ | قـ |
| Кк | käf کاف | [k] | ك | ـك | ـكـ | كـ |
| Гг | gäf گاف | [ɡ] | گ | ـگ | ـگـ | گـ |
| Ңң | käf üş noqat كاف ٴۇش نوقات | [ŋ~ɴ] | ڭ | ـڭ | ـڭـ | ڭـ |
| Лл | läm ٴلام | [l~ɫ] | ل | ـل | ـلـ | لـ |
| Мм | mim ميم | [m] | م | ـم | ـمـ | مـ |
| Нн | nun نۋن | [n] | ن | ـن | ـنـ | نـ |
| Ее | hä ٴحا | [jɪ] | ە | ـە | | ە |
| Һһ | hä ekı köz ٴحا ەكى كوز | [h] | ھ | ـھ | ـھـ | ھـ |
| Оо | uau ۋاۋ | [wʊ~o̞] | و | ـو | | و |
| Өө | hämzä-uau ٴحامزا-ۋاۋ | [wʏ~ɵ] | ٶ | ٴـو | | ٶ |
| Ұұ | uau damma ۋاۋ دامما | [ʊ] | ۇ | ـۇ | | ۇ |
| Үү | hämzä-uau damma ٴحامزا-ۋاۋ دامما | [ʏ] | ٷ | ٴـۇ | | ٷ |
| Уу | uau üş noqat ۋاۋ ٴۇش نوقات | [w], [ʊw], [ʏw] | ۋ | ـۋ | | ۋ |
| Вв | uau qūsbelgı ۋاۋ قۇسبەلگى | [v] | ۆ | ـۆ | | ۆ |
| Ыы | ia يا | [ə] | ى | ـى | ـىـ | ىـ |
| Іі | hämzä-ia ٴحامزا-يا | [ɪ] | ٴى | ٴـى | ٴـىـ | ٴىـ |
| Йй, Ии | ia ekı noqat يا ەكى نوقات | [j], [ɪj], [əj] | ي | ـي | ـيـ | يـ |
| Ъъ, Ьь | hämzä ٴحامزا | | ء | | | |

== Correspondence chart ==
Here is the correspondence chart of the official writing scripts:

| IPA | Cyrillic | Latin | | | Arabic | | Braille |
| IPA | Cyrillic | 2021 | 2018 | 2017 | Letter | Name | Braille |
|---|---|---|---|---|---|---|---|
| [ɑ] | А а | A a | | | ا | alif | ⠁ |
| [æ] | Ә ә | Ä ä | Á á | A' a' | ٵ | hamza + alif | ⠜ |
| [b] | Б б | B b | | | ب | ba | ⠃ |
| [v] | В в | V v | | | ۆ | waw with haček | ⠺ |
| [g] | Г г | G g | | | گ | gaf | ⠛ |
| [ʁ] | Ғ ғ | Ğ ğ | Ǵ ǵ | G' g' | غ | ghain | ⠻ |
| [d] | Д д | D d | | | د | dal | ⠙ |
| [e] | Е е | E e | | | ە | ha | ⠑ |
| [jo] | Ё ё | İo io | Io ıo | —N/a | (يو) | ya + waw | ⠡ |
| [ʒ~d͡ʒ] | Ж ж | J j | | | ج | jeem | ⠚ |
| [z] | З з | Z z | | | ز | za | ⠵ |
| [ɯj, ɪj] | И и | İ i | I ı | I' i' | ي | ya | ⠊ |
| [j] | Й й | İ i | I ı | I' i' | ي | ya | ⠽ |
| [k] | К к | K k | | | ك | kaf | ⠅ |
| [q~χ] | Қ қ | Q q | | | ق | qaf | ⠹ |
| [l] | Л л | L l | | | ل | lam | ⠇ |
| [m] | М м | M m | | | م | meem | ⠍ |
| [n] | Н н | N n | | | ن | noon | ⠝ |
| [ŋ] | Ң ң | Ñ ñ | Ń ń | N' n' | ڭ | kaf with three dots | ⠩ |
| [o] | О о | O o | | | و | waw | ⠕ |
| [ө] | Ө ө | Ö ö | Ó ó | O' o' | ٶ | hamza + waw | ⠣ |
| [p] | П п | P p | | | پ | pa | ⠏ |
| [r] | Р р | R r | | | ر | ra | ⠗ |
| [s] | С с | S s | | | س | seen | ⠎ |
| [t] | Т т | T t | | | ت | ta | ⠞ |
| [w, ʊw, yw, ɯw, ɪw] | У у | U u | Ý ý | Y' y' | ۋ | waw with 3 dots | ⠥ |
| [u~ʊ] | Ұ ұ | Ū ū | U u | | ۇ | waw with damma | ⠌ |
| [y~ʉ] | Ү ү | Ü ü | Ú ú | U' u' | ٷ | hamza + waw with damma | ⠬ |
| [f] | Ф ф | F f | | | ف | fa | ⠋ |
| [h] | Һ һ | H h | | | ھ | ha | ⠓ |
| [χ] | Х х | H h | | | خ | kha | ⠓ |
| [ts] | Ц ц | Ts ts | S s | —N/a | (تس) | ta + seen | ⠉ |
| [tɕ] | Ч ч | Tş tş | Ch ch | C' c' | چ | cheem | ⠟ |
| [ʃ] | Ш ш | Ş ş | Sh sh | S' s' | ش | sheen | ⠱ |
| [ɕː] | Щ щ | Ştş ştş | Shch shch | —N/a | (شش) | sheen + sheen | ⠭ |
| —N/a | Ъ ъ | —N/a | | | | | ⠷ |
| [ɯ] | Ы ы | Y y | | | ى | alif maqṣūrah | ⠮ |
| [ɪ] | І і | I ı | I i | | ئ | hamza + ya | ⠊ |
| —N/a | Ь ь | —N/a | | | | | ⠾ |
| [ɛ] | Э э | E e | | —N/a | (ە) | ha | ⠪ |
| [jʊ] | Ю ю | İu iu | Iý ıý | —N/a | ( يۋ ) | ya + waw with 3 dots | ⠳ |
| [jɑ] | Я я | İa ia | Ia ıa | —N/a | (يا) | ya + alif | ⠫ |

== Sample text ==
Article 1 of the Universal Declaration of Human Rights:

| Kazakh in Cyrillic script | Kazakh in Arabic script | English translation |
|---|---|---|
| Барлық адамдар тумысынан азат және қадір-қасиеті мен құқықтары тең болып дүниеге келеді. Адамдарға ақыл-парасат, ар-ождан берілген, сондықтан олар бір-бірімен туыстық, бауырмалдық қарым-қатынас жасаулары тиіс. | بارلىق ادامدار تۋمىسىنان ازات ٔجانە قادىر-قاسيەتى مەن قۇقىقتارى تەڭ بولىپ ٔدۇنيەگە كەلەدى. ادامدارعا اقىل-پاراسات، ار-وجدان بەرىلگەن، سوندىقتان ولار ٴبىر-بىرىمەن تۋىستىق، باۋىرمالدىق قارىم-قاتىناس جاساۋلارى تيىس. | All human beings are born free and equal in dignity and rights. They are endowed with reason and conscience, therefore they should act towards one another in a spirit of brotherhood. |
| Kazakh in Latin script (approved by Nazarbayev in 2017, revised 2018) | Kazakh in Latin script (version by Kazinform) | The 2017 Kazakh alphabet, also known as the "apostrophe alphabet" |
| Barlyq adamdar týmysynan azat jáne qadir-qasıeti men quqyqtary teń bolyp dúnıege keledi. Adamdarǵa aqyl-parasat, ar-ojdan berilgen, sondyqtan olar bir-birimen týystyq, baýyrmaldyq qarym-qatynas jasaýlary tıis. | Barlıq adamdar twmısınan azat jäne qadir-qasïeti men quqıqtarı teñ bolıp dünïege keledi. Adamdarğa aqıl-parasat, ar-ojdan berilgen, sondıqtan olar bir-birimen twıstıq, bawırmaldıq qarım-qatınas jasawları tïis. | Barlyq adamdar ty'mysynan azat ja'ne qadir-qasi'eti men quqyqtary ten' bolyp du'ni'ege keledi. Adamdarg'a aqyl-parasat, ar-ojdan berilgen, sondyqtan olar bir-birimen ty'ystyq, bay'yrmaldyq qarym-qatynas jasay'lary ti'is. |
| Kazakh in Yañalif (1929 variant) | Kazakh in Yañalif (1938 variant) | Kazakh in Pinyin (1964–1984) |
| Barlьq adamdar tuvmьsьnan azat çəne qadir-qasijeti men quqьqtarь teꞑ ʙolьp dynijege keledi. Adamdarƣa aqьl-parasat, ar-oçdan ʙerilgen, sondьqtan olar ʙir-ʙirimen tuvьstьq, ʙavьrmaldьq qarьm-qatьnas çasavlarь tijis. | Barlьq adamdar tumьsьnan azat çəne qadjr-qasietj men qūqьqtarь teꞑ ʙolьp dyniege keledj. Adamdarƣa aqьl-parasat, ar-oçdan ʙerjlgen, sondьqtan olar ʙjr-ʙjrjmen tuьstьq, ʙauьrmaldьq qarьm-qatьnas çasaularь tijs. | Barleⱪ adamdar tuwmesenan azat jənê ⱪadir-ⱪasiyêti mên ⱪuⱪeⱪtare têng bolep düniyêgê kêlêdi. Adamdarƣa aⱪel-parasat, ar-ojdan bêrilgên, sondeⱪtan olar bir-birimên tuwesteⱪ, bawermaldeⱪ ⱪarem-ⱪatenas jasawlare tiyis. |
| Kazakh in Latin (January 2021 variant) | Kazakh in Latin (April 2021 variant) | Kazakh in the International Phonetic Alphabet |
| Barlyq adamdar tumysynan azat jäne qadır-qasietı men qūqyqtary teŋ bolyp düniege keledı. Adamdarğa aqyl-parasat, ar-ojdan berılgen, sondyqtan olar bır-bırımen tuystyq, bauyrmaldyq qarym-qatynas jasaulary tiıs. | Barlyq adamdar tumysynan azat jäne qadır-qasietı men qūqyqtary teñ bolyp düniege keledı. Adamdarğa aqyl-parasat, ar-ojdan berılgen, sondyqtan olar bır-bırımen tuystyq, bauyrmaldyq qarym-qatynas jasaulary tiıs. | [b̥ɑrɫə́q ɑd̥ɑmd̥ɑ́r tʰumʊ́sʊnɑ́n ɑzɑ́t ʒæɲé qɑd̥ɘ́r qɑsijetʰɘ́ mʲen qʊχʊ́χtʰɑrə́ tʰʲéŋ b̥oɫʊ́p d̥ʉnʉjɵɣɵ́ cʰeʎed̥ɘ́ ‖ ɑd̥ɑ́md̥ɑrʁɑ́(‿)ɑχə́ɫ pʰɑrɑsɑ́t ɑ́r‿woʒd̥ɑ́n b̥ʲerɘʎɟ̊én | sond̥əχtʰɑ́n woɫɑ́r b̥ɘr b̥ɘrɘmʲén tʰʊwʊstə́q | b̥ɑwə́rmɑɫd̥ə́q qɑrə́m qɑtʰənɑ́s ʒɑsɑ́wɫɑrə́ tʰijís] |
