= Kazhymukan Munaitpasov Stadium, Shymkent =

Multi-purpose stadium in Shymkent, Kazakhstan

Kazhymukan Munaitpasov Stadium
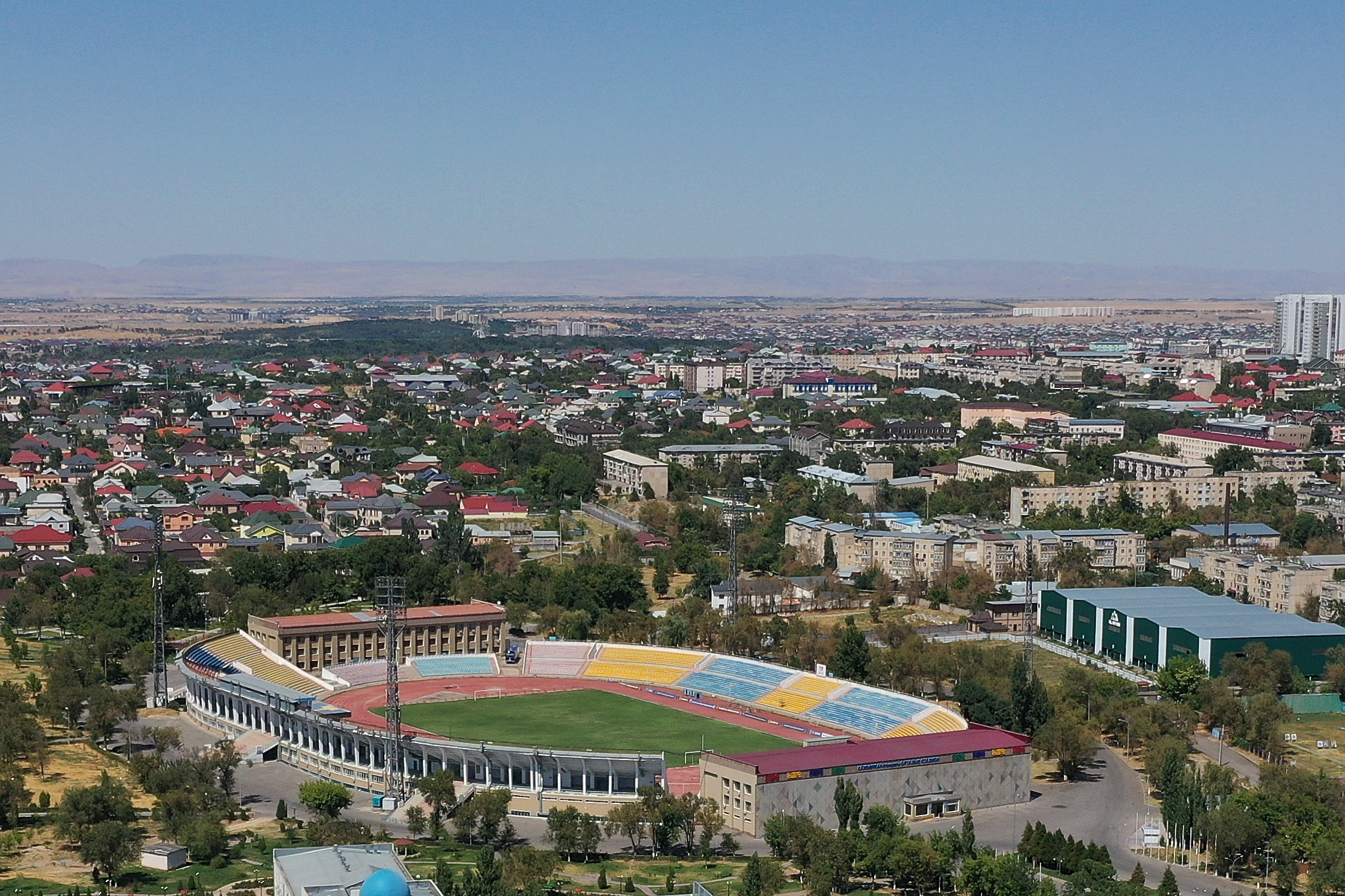
- Interactive map of Kazhymukan Munaitpasov Stadium
- Full name: Қажымұқан Мұңайтпасұлы
- Former names: 50th anniversary of October Revolution
- Location: Shymkent, Kazakhstan
- Coordinates: 42.335493°N 69.593568°E
- Owner: Municipality of Shymkent
- Capacity: 25,000
- Surface: Grass
- Record attendance: 25,000 (FC Ordabasy-FC Astana 2-0, 06 July 2023
- Field size: 110x70

Construction
- Built: 1969
- Opened: 1969
- Renovated: 2018

Tenant
- FC Ordabasy

Kajymukan Munaitpasov Stadium (Kazakh: Qajymūqan Mūñaitpasūly) is a multi-purpose stadium in Shymkent, Kazakhstan. It is currently used mostly for football matches. It is home of the FC Ordabasy football club, which plays in the Kazakhstan Premier League, Kazakhstan's top division of football. The stadium has a capacity of 25,000 people.

The stadium is named after Kazhymukan Munaitpasov, a Kazakh wrestler and repeated World Champion in Greco-Roman wrestling.
