= BGN/PCGN romanization of Kazakh =

Method for romanization of Cyrillic Kazakh texts

BGN/PCGN (Note: United States Board on Geographic Names (BGN) Permanent Committee on Geographical Names for British Official Use (PCGN)) romanization system for Kazakh is a method for romanization of Cyrillic Kazakh texts, that is, their transliteration into the Latin alphabet as used in the English language.

The BGN/PCGN system for transcribing Kazakh was designed to be relatively intuitive for anglophones to pronounce. It is part of the larger set of BGN/PCGN romanizations, which includes methods for twenty-nine different languages. It was developed by the United States Board on Geographic Names and by the Permanent Committee on Geographical Names for British Official Use.

This romanization of Kazakh can be rendered using the basic letters and punctuation found on English-language keyboards plus three diacritical marks: an umlaut (¨) to represent front vowels not otherwise represented by a roman character, a macron (ˉ) to represent "long vowels", and an overdot (˙) to differentiate between two ⟨e⟩s. The interpunct character (·) can also optionally be used to avoid certain ambiguity presented by the use of digraphs (e.g. ⟨ng⟩ represents ⟨ң⟩, and ⟨n·g⟩ may be used to represent ⟨нг⟩).

The following table describes the system and provides examples.

Cyrillic letter	Romanization	Special provision	Examples
А (а)	A (a)	None	Абай = Abay
Ә (ә)	Ä (ä)	None	Әуезов = Äūezov
Б (б)	B (b)	None	Aбай = Abay
В (в)	V (v)	This letter occurs principally in Russian loanwords.	Владимир = Vladīmīr
Г (г)	G (g)	None	Галина = Galina
Ғ (ғ)	Gh (gh)	None	
Д (д)	D (d)	None	
Е (е)	E (e)	None	
Ё (ё)	Yo (yo)	This letter occurs principally in Russian loanwords.	
Ж (ж)	Zh (zh)	None	Жамбыл = Zhambyl
З (з)	Z (z)	None	
И (и)	Ī (ī)	None	Шиелі = Shīeli
Й (й)	Y (y)	This letter does not occur in the beginning of a word in native Kazakh words.	Семей = Semey
К (к)	K (k)	None	Шымкент = Shymkent
Қ (қ)	Q (q)	None	
Л (л)	L (l)	None	
М (м)	M (m)	None	
Н (н)	N (n)	None	Өскемен = Öskemen
Ң (ң)	Ng (ng)	This letter does not occur in the beginning of a word.	Қаскелең = Qaskeleng
О (о)	O (o)	None	
Ө (ө)	Ö (ö)	None	Өскемен = Öskemen
П (п)	P (p)	None	
Р (р)	R (r)	None	
С (с)	S (s)	None	
Т (т)	T (t)	None	
У (у)	Ū (ū)	This letter represents both "long ū" and /w/ in Kazakh, the latter before and after vowels.	
Ұ (ұ)	U (u)	None	
Ү (ү)	Ü (ü)	None	
Ф (ф)	F (f)	This letter occurs principally in Russian loanwords.	Фурманов = Furmanov
Х (х)	Kh (kh)	None	
Һ (һ)	H (h)	None	
Ц (ц)	Ts (ts)	This letter occurs principally in Russian loanwords.	Ельцин = Yel’tsīn
Ч (ч)	Ch (ch)	This letter occurs principally in Russian loanwords.	
Ш (ш)	Sh (sh)	None	Көкшетау = Kökshetaū
Щ (щ)	Shch (shch)	With a few exceptions, this letter principally occurs in Russian loanwords.	
Ъ (ъ)	”	This letter does not occur in the beginning of a word, and only occurs in Russian loanwords.	
Ы (ы)	Y (y)	This letter may optionally be transcribed as ɨ.	Алматы = Almaty
І (і)	I (i)		Шиелі = Shīeli
Ь (ь)	’	This letter does not occur in the beginning of a word, and only occurs in Russian loanwords.	
Э (э)	Ė (ė)	This letter only occurs in Russian loanwords.	
Ю (ю)	Yu (yu)	This character actually represents y + ū in native Kazakh words, and does not occur at the beginning of native Kazakh words.	
Я (я)	Ya (ya)	This letter does not occur at the beginning of native Kazakh words.	

== See also ==
- ISO 9
