= Ahmet Baitursynuly =

Kazakh intellectual (1872–1937)

- Ахмет Байтұрсынұлы
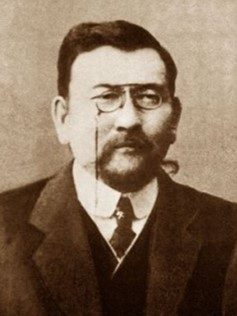
- Ahmet in 1913
- Born: c. 5 September 1872; Aqkӧl, Turgay Oblast, Russian Empire
- Died: 8 December 1937 (aged 65); Alma-Ata, Kazakh SSR, Soviet Union
- Occupations: Poet; turkologist; teacher; translator
- Political party: Constitutional Democratic (1905–1917); Alash (1917–1919); Communist (1919–1929)
- Spouse: Badrisafa Baitursynova
- Children: 3
- Parents: Baitursyn Shoshakuly (father); Kunshy Qulybekqyzy (mother)

Ahmet Baitursynuly (Note: Kazakh: Ахмет Байтұрсынұлы, romanized: Ahmet Baitūrsynūly, احمەت بايتۇرسىنۇلى, [ɑχˈmʲet bɑjto̙ɾˈsəno̙ɫɯ]) (Note: Often transliterated as Akhmet Baitursynov through a Russified Romanization of Ахмет Байтурсынов.) (c. 5 September 1872 — 8 December 1937) was a Kazakh intellectual who worked in the fields of politics, poetry, linguistics, and education.

Ahmet reformed the Kazakh alphabet. In 1912, he excluded all the purely Arabic letters not used in the Kazakh language and added letters specific to the Kazakh language. Ahmet's orthographic reform resulted in a script that functions like a true phonetic alphabet, with one letter for every sound in the Kazakh language, compared to the basic Arabic abjad. The new alphabet, named Töte jazu (meaning straight writing), is still used by Kazakhs living in China, Afghanistan, and in Iran. Ahmet also developed the basics of Kazakh and the scientific terminology for the definition of Kazakh grammar. In 1937, due to his outspoken patriotism, he was executed by a firing squad during the Great Purge. He is considered a national hero by Kazakhs for his efforts in increasing literacy among his people, and a şahid for his unjust execution at the hands of the Stalinist regime.

== Early life, education ==
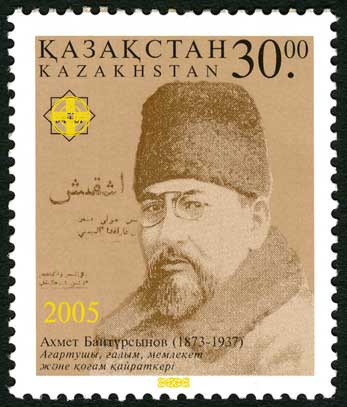
A 2005 Kazakhstan stamp of Ahmet Baitursynuly

Ahmet Baitursynuly was born to a Muslim Kazakh family in what is today the Kostanay Region, Kazakhstan and was educated at the Orenburg Teachers' School. After graduating in 1895, Ahmet held teaching positions in a number of cities in Kazakhstan, including Aktobe, Kostanay and Karkaraly.

When Ahmet was 13 years old, police officers led by Colonel Yakovlev came to the village and staged a pogrom. Ahmet's father, Baitursyn Shoshak-uly, and three of Ahmet's brothers beat up Colonel Yakovlev. As a punishment, they were sent by Russian authorities to Siberia for 15 years.

Ahmet obtained literacy in Kazakh, Persian, Ottoman Turkish, and Arabic from the village mullahs. In his teenage years, he was sent to the Turgai Russian-Kazakh School by his relatives to learn more Russian. After graduating from there, Ahmet moved to Orenburg to continue his education by attending a four-year teacher's school, founded by Kazakh intellectual Ibrahim Altynsarin. In Orenburg, Ahmet faced financial difficulties, but still graduated from school in 1895. The same year of his graduation, he published his first article, "Kazakskiye primety i poslovitsy" ("Kazakh Superstitions and Proverbs") in a regional newspaper.

Ahmet taught at the village schools in the Aktyubinsk, Kostanay and Karkaraly regions. While working as a teacher in a Russian-Kazakh school in the Kostanay region, Ahmet lived in a house near a Russian forester, whose daughter, Alexandra Ivanovna, fell in love and married him. Their marriage was committed in a Muslim mosque in the village of Auliyekol. Ivanovna converted to Islam, and changed her name to Badrisafa Muhammetsadikova Baitursynova. They lived in Kostanay, where he worked as a teacher in a Russian-Kazakh school. The following year, Ahmet and his wife moved to Omsk, then to Karkaralinsk, where they stayed until 1909.

== Political activity ==
=== Activism and imprisonment (1905–1909) ===
In 1905, he collaborated with other Kazakhs to form the Kazakh wing of the Constitutional Democrat Party. Ahmet was one of the authors of the Karkaraly Petition, which advocated to stop the expropriation of land from the Kazakhs, suspend the flow of immigrants, and to establish popular zemstvos. In 1907, he was first imprisoned for criticizing the Tsarist administration, and then in 1909 again for 8 months without a trial in the Semipalatinsk prison. His involvement in politics probably led to him being exiled from the Steppe regions. After being exiled, Ahmet moved to Orenburg.

=== Exile (1911–1917) ===
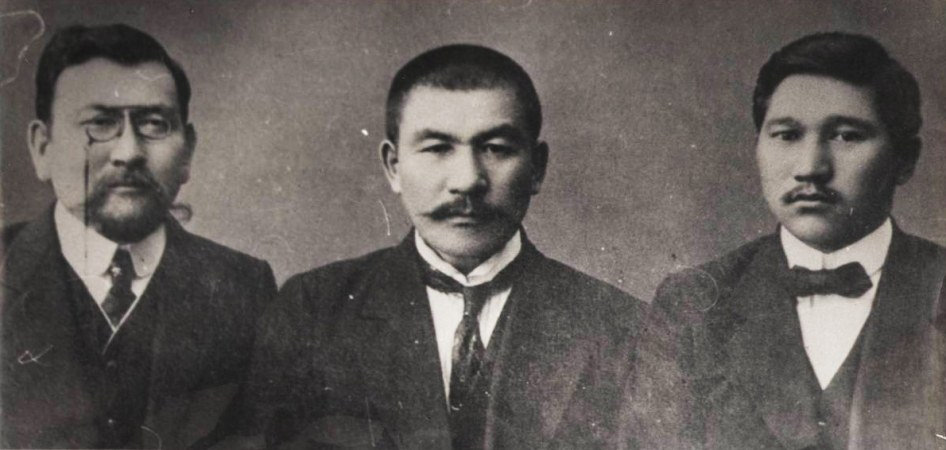
Ahmet (left), along with Bukeikhanov (center) and Mirjaqip (right) in Orenburg, 1913

During his exile, he wrote articles for Ay Qap. In 1911, Baytursinuli published his first work of a distinctly political nature — Masa ("Mosquito"). In 1913, Baytursynuly, along with former deputy of the First State Duma, Alihan Bökeyhan, and Mirjaqıp Dulatulı, a poet and a writer, founded a Kazakh newspaper named Qazaq in Orenburg where Ahmet served as the chief editor. The newspaper ran until the spring of 1918. During that time, he published "Qyryq Mysal" ("Forty Proverbs"). His other significant publication as well was a Kazakh translation of Ivan Krylov's fables.

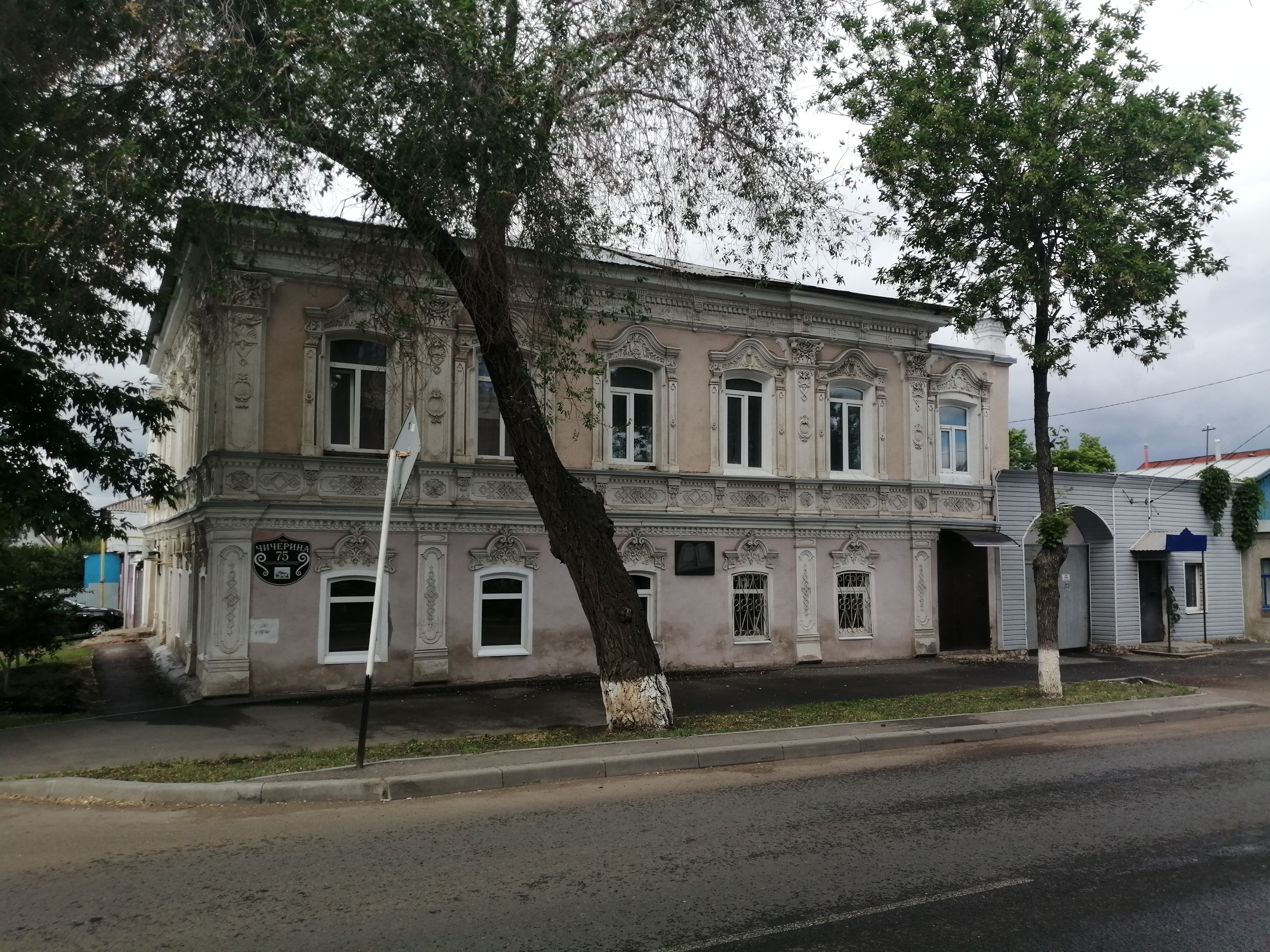
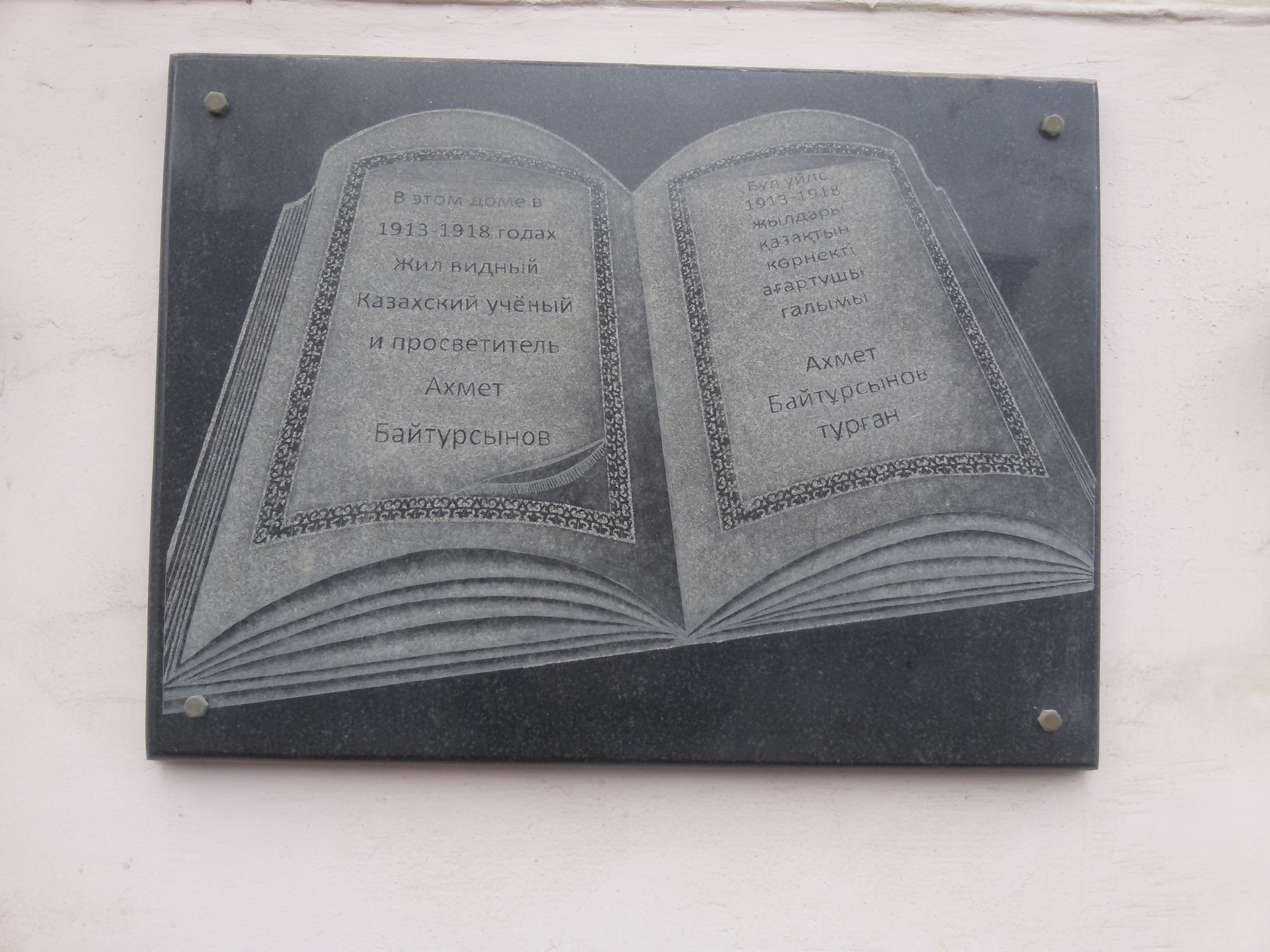
Former home of Baitursynuly in Orenburg with a memorial plaque

=== Alash Orda (1917–1919) ===
During the Russian Revolution of 1917 occurred, Ahmet returned to the steppes and began to work with the members of Alash Orda. With them, he sought for the Kazakhs to have an independent state. At the two Pan-Kyrgyz congresses in Orenburg, he participated in the creation of the Alash party and was one of the organizers and leaders of the Alash Autonomy. At the end of that year, Ahmet was elected to the Constituent Assembly from the Turgai constituency. On 4 April 1919, he was granted amnesty by the All-Russian Central Executive Committee. After that, Ahmet sided with the Soviet government and joined the Bolshevik Communist Party. From 1919, he served as a Member of the Committee of Deputies of the Constituent Assembly and as Deputy Chairman of the Revolutionary Committee of the Kazakh Krai, as well as Commissioner of Enlightenment. In these capacities, he helped to reform education and to establish the first university in the Kazakh SSR.

== Later life and execution ==
In June 1929, he was reminded of political activity and arrested by the NKVD, and sent to prison in Kyzyl-Orda, as in tsarist times again with Mirjaqyp Dulatuly, and then was sent to the Arkhangelsk region. His wife, Baitursynova and her adopted daughter Sholpan were sent to Tomsk. In 1934, at the request of Yekaterina Peshkova (wife of Maxim Gorky), who worked on the Red Cross Commission, Ahmet was released. He reunited with his family who already had three adopted children in Alma-Ata. In October 1937, Ahmet was arrested again for the last time for hiding "bourgeois nationalist sentiments". Two months later, on 8 December 1937, he was executed. This resulted in an outcry, which was quickly and bloodily silenced.

== Legacy ==
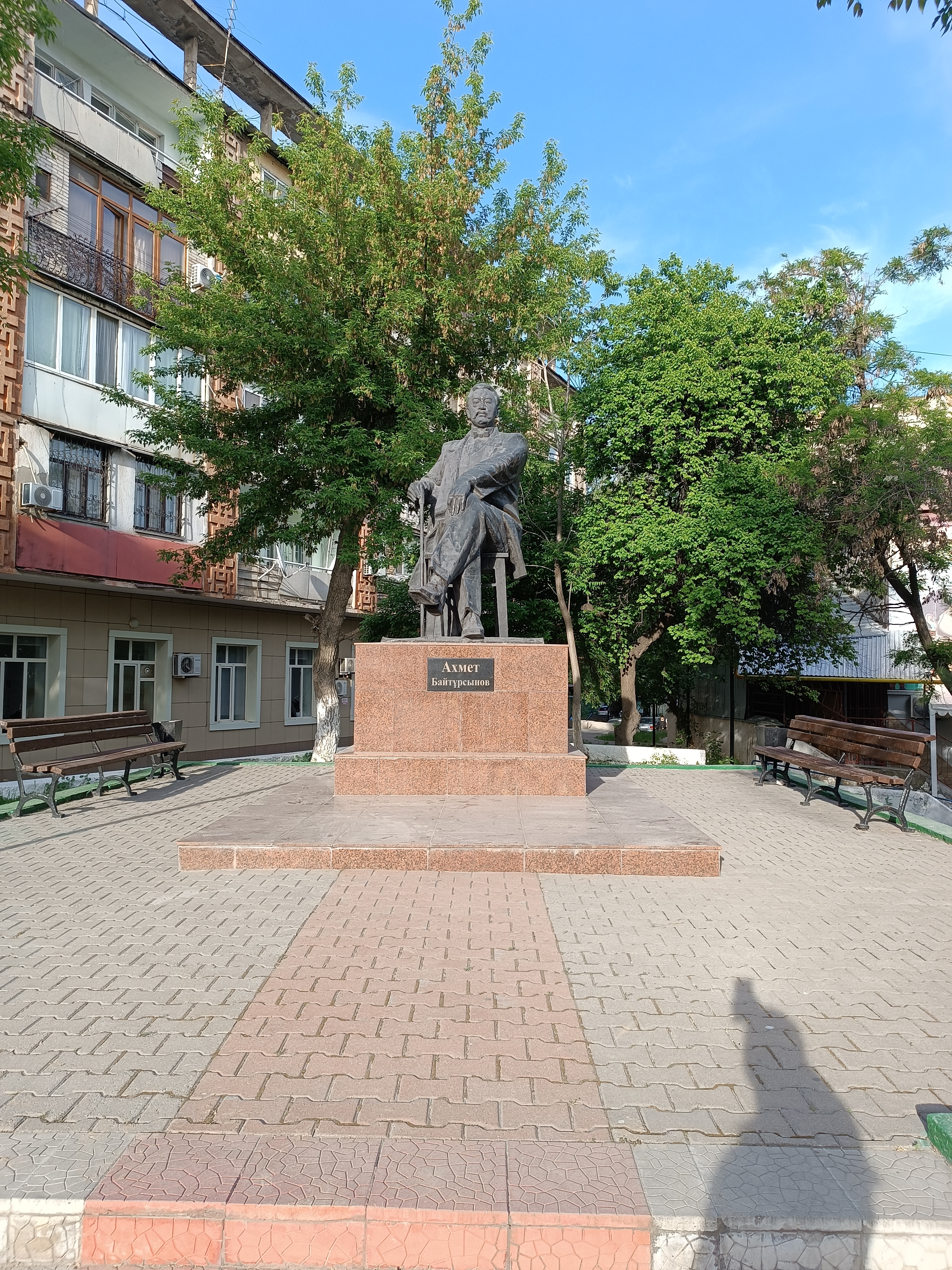
Monument of Ahmet Baitursynuly in Shymkent

To this day, Ahmet is held in great regard in Kazakhstan, but is viewed as a somewhat tragic figure, signifying the extent of the numbers of authors, poets and thinkers who have perished due to the Soviet repressions. The Baitursynov Home Museum in honor of Ahmet was established in one of his former residences in Alma-Ata, and a number of streets were renamed in his memory across Kazakhstan. A statue of him is also to be found in the town of Kostanay. Ahmet's work is also part of the curriculum for the high school education system of Kazakhstan. Another of Ahmet's significant accomplishments was his adaptation of Arabic script for the Kazakh alphabet.

In 2021, UNESCO included Akhmet Baitursynuly on the list of UNESCO anniversaries for 2022–2023 in honor of the 150th anniversary of his birth.

On 4 July 2021, a statue of Baitursynov alongside his colleagues Alikhan Bokeikhanov and Mirjaqip Dulatuli was unveiled in Astana.

In November 2022, a monument to Akhmet was unveiled. The ceremony was attended by President Kassym-Jomart Tokayev, relatives of the scientist and representatives of the creative intelligentsia.

On 30 December 2022, in honor of the 150th anniversary of the scientist-turkologist, publicist, prominent statesman Akhmet Baitursynuly, a monument and a park were opened in Ankara.
