= Mirjaqip Dulatuli =

Kazakh poet, writer, and politician (1885–1935)

Mirjaqyp Dulatuly
- Міржақып Дулатұлы
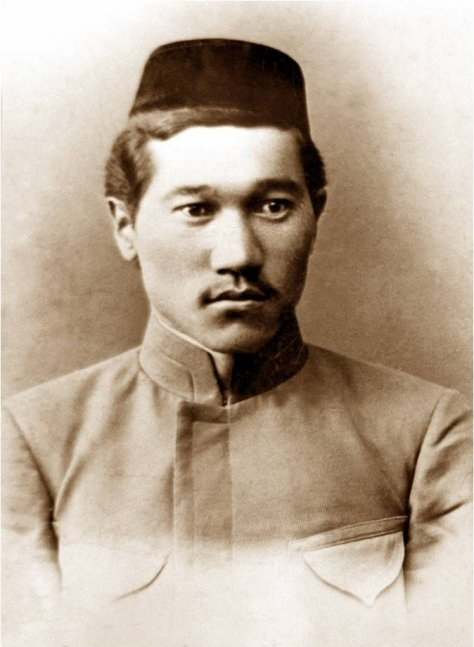
- Mirjaqip in 1916
- Born: 25 November 1885; Sarikopa, Turgaysky Uyezd, Turgay Oblast, Russia
- Died: 5 October 1935 (aged 49); Solovki prison camp, Soviet Union
- Other name: Mir Jakub
- Citizenship: Russian Empire; Alash Orda; Soviet Union
- Occupations: Poet, Writer, Politician
- Political party: Constitutional Democratic (1907–1917); Alash (1917–1920)

Mirjaqyp Dulatuly (Kazakh: Міржақып Дулатұлы, Mırjaqyp Dulatūly; Russian: Миржакып Дулатов; 1885–1935), also known as Mir Yakub Dulatov, was a Kazakh poet, writer and one of leaders of Kazakh nationalist Alash Orda government. He also is known to have used the pen names Madiyar and Argyn.

== Early life ==
Mirjaqip was born on November 25, 1885, to a Muslim family in the village of Sarikopa, Turgay Oblast. He was from Middle jüz, Argyn tribe. He lost his mother, Demesh, at the age of two and his father, Dulat, at the age of 12. He received early education in the traditional village school. In 1897, Mirjaqip enrolled in a Kazakh-Russian high school and graduated in 1902 as a village teacher. In 1904, he met Ahmet Baitursynuly and Älihan Bökeihan in Karkaraly. Under the influence of these two leaders of emerging Kazakh reformist nationalist movement, he developed an anti-colonial, anti-Russian view.

He moved to St. Petersburg in 1907 and became a delegate of Constitutional Democratic Party. In St. Petersburg, he published his first poem in the Kazakh journal "Serke", which ran only one issue. The poem was entitled Jastarğa ("to the Youth").

He contributed another article, Bizdiñ Maqsatymyz ("Our Objective"), to the second issue of the journal, which was never published.

== Political activities ==
Mirjaqyp's political formation was greatly maturated when he published his first poetry book, «Oyan! Qazaq», "Wake up! Kazakh" in 1909. The book was immediately confiscated. He republished Oyan! Qazaq in 1911 and returned to the Turgay oblast after the publication of the book.

Meanwhile, Mirjaqip published his first novel Baqytsyz Jamal, "Jamal the Unfortunate" in 1910. Baqytsyz Jamal has been the first novel in the contemporary Kazakh literature. The book narrates the story of oppressed Kazakh women.

Thus, in early 1910s, Mirjaqip emerges as a leader of emerging Kazakh reformism and nationalist movement. His publications puts him under Russian surveillance, investigations and intimidations. Under Tsarist Russian surveillance, Mirjaqip could not have a steady job or settle down in a town for a long time. He was arrested in Semey in 1911 and served one and half years prison term.

After his release, Mirjaqip regularly contributed to Kazakh language periodicals Ayqap and Qazaq until 1918 when Qazaq was closed by the Kerensky government. In his essays and poems Mirjaqip criticized socio-economic, political conditions of Kazakhs under imperial administration. He also published another poetry, Azamat, "Citizen" in 1913.

Mirjaqip was one of the leaders of Alash Orda Government which was formed to promote Kazakh autonomy under the Menshevik government. Alash leaders, including Baitursynuly and Mirjaqip, aligned with the Whites, declared independence of Kazakhstan and fought against Bolsheviks between December 1917-May 1919. When the leader of the Whites, Admiral Aleksandr Kolchak, turned down requests of Alash leaders for help, the Kazakh nationalists realigned with the Bolsheviks expecting autonomy under Bolshevik government. In 1920, autonomous socialist republic was established and Alash leaders participated in local government.

Mirjaqip worked as an editor and teacher under Bolshevik government. In 1928, he was arrested on nationalism charges and died in Solovki labour camp in 1935.

== Legacy ==
Mirjaqip was rehabilitated post-humously in 1988. He is considered to be one of the pioneers of modern Kazakh literature, and a leader of Kazakh nationalism.

The first novel in Kazakh literature is "Unfortunate Zhamal" ("Baqytsyz Jamal"). The author describes Jamal, a Kazakh girl, who becomes a victim of patriarchal- feudal traditions and customs, and exposing the fight between old traditions and new generation on this basis. The novel is celebrated for clear depiction of a feeling of equality, among rising young people of that time.

== Works ==
- Oyan! Qazaq, Almati: Altyn Orda (1991)
- Shigharmalari, Mirjaqip Dulatuli (1991) by Z. Akhmetov and Jazushy Baspasy
- Baqitsiz Jamal (1910)
- Azamat (1913)
- Terme (1915)
- Esep Qurali (1922)
- Qiyragat Kitabi (1924)

== In popular culture ==
The 1993 movie, Return of Mir-Yakub (Kazakh: Міржақыптың оралуы), published by Kazakhtelefilm and made by film director Kalila Umarov, is dedicated to Mirjaqip.
