= Ush Zhuz =

Kazakh socialist party (1917-1920)

Three Hordes Үш Жүз
- Leader: Kölbai Tögisov
- Founder: Mukan Aitpenov
- Founded: 17 November 1917
- Dissolved: c. 1920
- Split from: Alash Party
- Merged into: Communist Party of Turkestan
- Ideology: Pan-Turkism; Pan-Islamism; Socialism; Anarchism
- Political position: Left-wing
- Religion: Islam

Üsh Zhüz (Kazakh: Үш Жүз, lit. 'Three Hordes' (Note: Also transliterated as "Üsh Jüz".)) was a Kazakh socialist political party. Founded in the wake of the Central Asian revolt of 1916 and the Russian Revolution of 1917, the party supported Pan-Turkism, federal republicanism and land reform. It was opposed to the Alash party, which aligned with the White movement, while Üsh Zhüz itself aligned with the Bolsheviks and eventually merged into the Communist Party of Turkestan. Some of its leading members, including Turar Ryskulov, became prominent figures within the Turkestan Autonomous Soviet Socialist Republic (TASSR).

== History ==
During the Central Asian revolt of 1916, the Kazakh activist Mukan Aitpenov established the newspaper Alash in order to publicise support for the proposal of Alash Autonomy. It ceased publication during the Russian Revolution of 1917, by which point Aitpenov had dropped support for the Alash party and moved to establish a new political party.

Üsh Zhüz was established in Omsk in November 1917, and later moved its headquarters to Tashkent. Its leader was Kölbai Tögisov, a member of the Kazakh intelligentsia with a "shady reputation". The party's political programme blended together elements of anarchism, socialism, Pan-Turkism, and Pan-Islamism. Its stated aim was the unification of all Turkic peoples in the former Russian Empire into a federal republic. The party drew its support base largely from southern Kazakhs, with southern leaders such as Turar Ryskulov, Saken Seifullin, Amankeldı İmanov, Älıbi Jangeldin all supporting it.

It was the main opposition to the Alash party, a liberal democratic and nationalist party, largely drawn from northern Kazakhs, that was aligned with the White movement. Points of disagreement between Alash and Üsh Zhüz included issues of land reform, Central Asian autonomy and the role of Islam in politics. Üsh Zhüz was among a number of radical Muslim parties, including the Milliy Firqa, Young Bukharans and Muslim Socialist Committee of Kazan, that sided with the Bolsheviks against the White movement in the Russian Civil War. In order to counter White influence in Kazakhstan, in 1918, the Bolsheviks formed an alliance with Üsh Zhüz. Over time, the party's positions moved closer to those of the Russian communists, purging members of the petite bourgeoisie from its ranks.

But the party's conception of Islamic socialism isolated it from the Kazakh masses, which were more inclined towards the political moderates. The party ultimately failed to gain a substantial following in Kazakhstan and, after the establishment of the Kazakh Autonomous Socialist Soviet Republic, many of its members merged into the Communist Party. Ryskulov continued to promote pan-Turkism, in spite of Bolshevik aversion to the regional unity of Central Asia. By the end of the civil war in 1922, Ryskulov himself declared that the Alash Autonomy had been a legitimate representative of Kazakh interests, breaking from the Bolshevik line that it was a "tribal-nationalist" creation. Southern Kazakh leaders subsequently adopted the educational and land reform programmes of the Alash Autonomy, pushing for them within the new Soviet government.

== Bibliography ==
- Bekmagambetova, M. (2018). Modern History of Kazakhstan (PhD). Kostanay State Pedagogical University. ISBN 978-601-7934-58-3.
- Dave, Bhavna (2007). "From nomadism to national consciousness". Kazakhstan: Ethnicity, Language and Power. Routledge. pp. 29–49. ISBN 978-0-415-36371-6. LCCN 2007012294.
- Fisher, Lyn R. (1989). Qazaqjylyq Nationalism and revolution in Kazakhstan, 1900-1920 (MA). University of Montana.
- Karmazina, Lydia (2008). "Institutionalization of the party system in Kazakhstan and Russia: a comparative analysis" (PDF). Central Asia and the Caucasus. 6 (54): 141–154.
- Kendirbay, Gulnar (1997). "The national liberation movement of the Kazakh intelligentsia at the beginning of the 20th century". Central Asian Survey. 16 (4): 487–515. doi:10.1080/02634939708401009.
- Sabol, Steven (1995). "The creation of Soviet Central Asia: The 1924 national delimitation". Central Asian Survey. 14 (2): 225–241. doi:10.1080/02634939508400901.
- Saktaganova, Z.G.; Omarova, B.K.; Ilyassova, K.M.; Nurligenov, Z.N.; Abzhapparova, B.Zh.; Zhalmurzina, A.Zh.; Mazhitova, Zh.S. (2020). "The Alash Party: Historiography of the Movement". Space and Culture, India. 7 (4): 208–218. doi:10.20896/saci.v7i4.791.
- Sara, Mehwish Hassan (2006). "Resurgence of Islam in Central Asia: A Case Study of Uzbekistan". Strategic Studies. 26 (2): 143–74. JSTOR 45242351.
- Smith, Jeremy (2013). Red Nations: The Nationalities Experience in and after the USSR. Cambridge University Press. ISBN 978-0-521-11131-7.
- Uyama, Tomohiko (2000). "The Geography of Civilizations: a spatial analysis of the Kazakh intelligentsia's activities, from the mid-nineteenth to the Early twentieth Century" (PDF). In Matsuzato, Kimitaka (ed.). Regions - a prism to view the Slavic-Eurasian world: towards a discipline of "regionology". Hokkaido University. pp. 70–99. ISBN 9784938637194. OCLC 44591996.
