= Alash militia =

Kazakh national militia of the Russian Civil War

Alash Militia
- Алаш әскері Alash äskeri
- Banner of the Alash Militia
- Active: 1917–1920
- Country: Alash Autonomy
- Allegiance: Alash Orda (1917–1918); White movement (1918–1919); Red Army (partial, 1919–1920)
- Type: Cavalry militia
- Size: c. 13,500 (peak)
- Engagements: Russian Civil War: Aktobe Front; Turgai uprising; Aktobe Operation; Ural Defense; Battle of Uralsk; Jambeits Uprising; Lbishcensky Raid (Note: Steppe Partisan Detachment of Ensign I.I. Korzhev); Semirechye Front; Cherkasy Defense; Battle of Kyzyl-Agach; Storming of Sergiopol; Battle of Makanchi; Battle of Saratovka and Antonovka; Mariinsky Uprising; Osipovsky Rebellion; Ural-Guryev Operation

Commanders
- Notable commanders: Alikhan Bukeikhanov; Khamit Tokhtamyshev; Mustafa Chokay; Otynshy Alzhanov; Sadyk Amanzholov; Zhansha Dosmukhamedov

The Alash Militia (Алаш әскері, Alash äskeri) was the military force of the Alash Autonomy, a short-lived Kazakh national government formed during the Russian Civil War. Established in late 1917 as a people's militia to protect Kazakh communities from banditry and the collapse of central authority, it developed into organised cavalry units that fought first alongside the White movement and later, in part, with the Red Army.

At its height the militia numbered approximately 13,500 men, mostly Kazakh horsemen led by a small cadre of officers who had served in the First World War.

== History ==
=== Formation ===
Following the February Revolution, Kazakh intellectuals founded the Alash Party. The October Revolution brought widespread disorder to the steppe. At the Second All-Kazakh Congress in December 1917 the Alash Autonomy was proclaimed, and a decision was taken to create a national militia. The project to create the army of the Alash-Orda, titled “Alash Militia,” was prepared back at the Second All-Kazakh Congress (in the original, the General Kyrgyz Congress). The government planned to call 13,500 people into the armed forces of the newly formed state. From the Bukey Governorate, 1,000 people, from the Turgay Region, 3,000, from the Ural Region, 2,000, from the Akmola Region, 4,000, from the Semirechye Region, 2,000, and from the Semipalatinsk Region, 1,500 conscripts between the ages of 20 and 35. Each volost was required to supply armed volunteers, who were trained by Kazakh officers such as Captain Khamit Tokhtamyshev.

Initial units were ad hoc groups of local riders, equipped with scavenged rifles and family-donated horses, focused on repelling looters and securing villages.

=== Alliance with the White movement ===
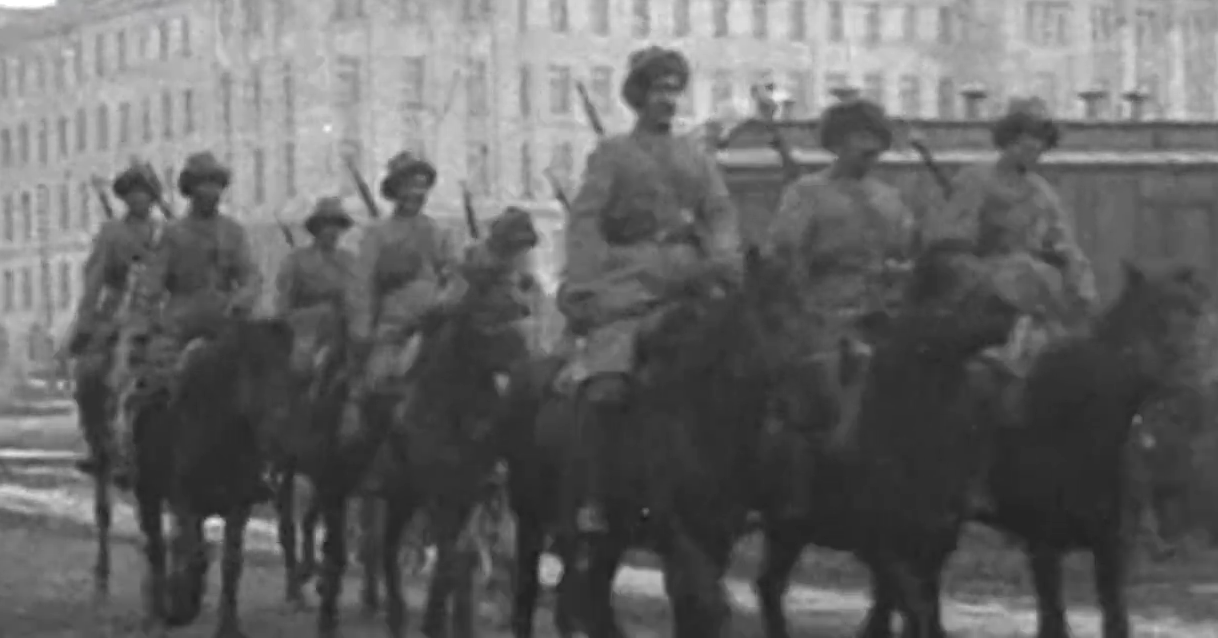
Alash soldiers in Semipalatinsk 1919

In 1918 the Alash government concluded an alliance with the anti-Bolshevik forces of Admiral Alexander Kolchak. Two regular cavalry regiments were formed, officially designated Kirghiz regiments (the term “Alash” was prohibited by Kolchak). These units saw combat on the Ural, Orenburg and Semirechye fronts, where they earned a reputation for mobility and scouting. Few Alash soldiers were awarded the Order of St. George for bravery. Alexander Dutov had hired personal Kirghiz/Alash bodyguards from the regiments he had helped form in Kustanay and Turgay.

Men between the ages of 20 and 35, fit for service, were conscripted into the militia. The Alash Orda National Fund provided the militia with ammunition and weapons. The leaders of the western part of Alash Orda Zhahansha and Khalel Dosmukhamedovs received one machine gun and 600 rifles from Komuch; the Turgay Alash Orda received 20,000 rounds of ammunition and 300 rifles. With the help of Ataman Alexander Dutov, two cavalry regiments were formed in the Kustanay and Irgiz districts

In April-May 1918, the Semipalatinsk branch of Alash Orda established contact with an underground anti-Bolshevik organization and donated 29,000 rubles. They agreed on a joint armed uprising. Training and military education began among local Kazakhs under the guidance of Russian officer instructors. This took place in villages near Semipalatinsk. During the uprising, Kazakh units failed to capture Semipalatinsk, and other underground forces took up the task. The Bolsheviks abandoned the city on June 10. On June 18, a Kazakh detachment, estimated at 300–500 mounted fighters, entered the suburb of Semipalatinsk (Zarechnaya Sloboda). On the 16th, a Muslim department consisting of three people was organized at the city's military headquarters, one of whom was Lieutenant Colonel Khamit Tokhtamyshev, who became the department's head. Thanks to Tokhtamyshev's leadership, a detachment of Kazakh horsemen who had arrived in Semipalatinsk was transferred to the department, later forming the basis of the 1st Semipalatinsk Cavalry Regiment. Tokhtamyshev himself took the post of head of the military council of the Alash Orda government. Because non-Russians were prohibited from serving in the Russian army, the Kazakhs had no officers of their own, so the Alash Orda people planned to establish their own cadet school in Orenburg, but lacked the funds.

"... On June 5, 1918, a formed Kazakh detachment of 500 horsemen entered the town of Alash. On June 6, a ceremonial welcome was held in the center of Alash. The detachment was armed and trained in military arts, and had its own uniform, reminiscent of a national camisole with stitched leather collars. A white flag was established, with a yurt depicted in its center...".

In September 1919 the Orenburg Cossacks were defeated, and what remained of their forces were retreating, mostly eastwards. This left the Urals Cossacks and the western branch of the Alash Orda cut off from the other White forces. The Soviets decided to concentrate their forces to defeat them. The Alash militia functioned as a vital but increasingly desperate force of approximately 9,500 soldiers, composed of 8,600 cavalry and 900 infantry equipped with 36 guns and 80 machine guns. Alongside the Ural Army, these men found themselves strategically isolated by mid-December 1919 as the Red Army was closing in. Faced with the consequences of possible annihilation and heavy losses, the Western Alash government officially surrendered its troops to the Bolsheviks on December 19, 1919.

=== Transition to the Red Army and dissolution ===
Alash leaders negotiated an amnesty with the Soviet government. Approximately 4,000 cavalrymen transferred to the Red Army, served against Nestor Makhno in Ukraine, and were demobilised in 1920. The remaining units were disbanded. In December 1919, Alash forces on the side of the Red Army and its allies, defeated the rear of the White troops and destroyed the headquarters of the Iletsk Cossack Corps. The Alash Autonomy was dissolved in August 1920 and incorporated into the Kirghiz (Kazakh) ASSR.

== Uniforms ==
The uniform of the Alash Militia varied, with Alash militias in the West, East and in Semirechye with different uniforms. Alash militias in the east were reported to have wore "Russian uniforms".

An excerpt from the instructions for mobilizing horsemen for the Ural Vilayat (West of Alash Orda) which can help determine the uniform of the militia in the West:

"...12. The aul community from which a horseman is accepted is obliged to provide one pair of boots, one change of new underwear, a beshmet and khaki trousers, preferably a camel wool chekmen, a brown hat (kyzylbork), a short sheepskin coat or short fur coat.

13) Horse equipment must consist of a saddle, three saddle pads, three girths, a cushion, a halter, a bridle, a tripod, a brace, a strap chilbire, and a nagaika..."

Boris Annenkov's Separate Partisan Division in Semirechye included the 3rd Alash Regiment. Its shoulder straps, collar tabs, and stripes are green.

== Legacy ==
The Alash militia is regarded in modern Kazakhstan as the first national military formation of the Kazakh people in the twentieth century and a symbol of the struggle for self-determination.

== See also ==
- White movement
- Siberian Army
- Alash Orda
- Kazakhstan
