= Älıbi Jangeldin =

Kazakh revolutionary, traveler and Soviet politician (1883–1953)

- Әліби Жангелдин
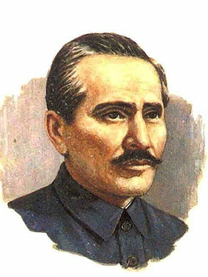
- Jangeldin on a Soviet commemorative stamped envelope, 1984

Chairman of the Central Executive Committee of the Kazakh SSR
- In office July 1937 – 28 October 1937
- Preceded by: Uzakbay Kulumbetov
- Succeeded by: Nurbapa Umurzakov

Personal details
- Born: 1883 Koydaul, Turgay Oblast, Governor-Generalship of the Steppes, Russian Empire (now Kazakhstan)
- Died: 14 August 1953 (aged 69–70) Alma-Ata, Kazakh SSR, Soviet Union (now Almaty, Kazakhstan)
- Awards: Order of Lenin; Order of the Red Banner

Military service
- Allegiance: Central Asian revolt; Russian SFSR
- Years of service: 1916–1917; 1917–1919
- Battles/wars: Central Asian revolt of 1916; Russian Civil War

Älıbi Toqjanūly Jangeldin (Kazakh: Әліби Тоқжанұлы Жангелдин; Russian: Алиби Тогжанович Джангильдин, romanized: Alibi Togzhanovich Dzhangildin), also known by his nom de guerre Nikolay Stepnov (Russian: Николай Степнов, lit. 'Nikolai of the Steppes'; 1883 – 14 August 1953) was a Kazakh revolutionary, traveler, and Soviet politician who was briefly Chairman of the Executive Committee of the Kazakh Soviet Socialist Republic from July to October 1937.

== Early life ==
Älıbi Jangeldin was born in to the a large family of a poor shepherd nomad (sharua) from the Qypşaq clan in the Middle Jüz. The ten-year-old Jangeldin caught the attention of a traveling teacher who invited him to his school. Soon afterwards the boy fled from his parents' home and traveled with a caravan to Turgay, where he was accepted into school. There he met the revolutionary baatar Amankeldı İmanov. Following advice from relatives, his father brought his son back from school. At the age of twelve, Jangeldin fled again, this time to Kostanay, where he was immediately accepted into the Russian-Kazakh school. His father found him there too, and only at the request of the school director did his father agree to allow him to continue attending school. After successfully passing his final exams, Jangeldin was sent to the religious consistory in Orenburg. Here he met influential compatriots from the steppe.

After he had completed the exams quickly, he was sent to Kazan in 1902 to study at the teacher training college. During the Russian Revolution of 1905, he took part in the revolutionary student movement. The administration then sent him to the history faculty of the Moscow Theological Academy to dismay him from his revolutionary activities. After the second year of the course, he was expelled from the course because of revolutionary activities.

== Travels ==
In 1908, Jangeldin left Russia with a passport under the name of Nikolai Stepnov and began a world tour, earning his living by photographing interesting places and selling the photos. He traveled mostly on foot through Poland, Austria-Hungary, Serbia, Bulgaria, Turkey, Palestine, Egypt, Abyssinia, Arabia, Persia, India, Siam, Annam and southern China, while he finally stayed in Japan only briefly in 1912, as he was able to return to Russia due to the amnesty on the occasion of the 300th anniversary of the Romanov dynasty.

Because Jangeldin was not allowed to stay in his home region of Turgay after his return, he worked at weather stations in Crimea in 1913 and was active as a revolutionary among the Crimean Tatars. During the First World War he joined the Bolshevik wing of the Russian Social Democratic Labour Party in Petrograd in 1915.

== Central Asian Uprising and Russian Civil War ==
When Nicholas II issued his Requisitions Ukase on 25 June 1916, calling on non-Russian men aged 19 to 43 to work near the front, rumors spread that the entire male population would be used to dig trenches between the Russian and German fronts, sparking an uprising in the Kazakh steppe. On behalf of the Bolsheviks, Jangeldin went incognito to Turgay Oblast to join İmanov in leading the rebellious Basmachi. İmanov formed a disciplined cavalry force and became commander-in-chief, relying on a war council. At the height of the uprising, around 50,000 fighters followed Imanov's banner. In October 1916, İmanov laid siege to the town of Turgay (in what is now Kostanay Region). When the Russian relief corps approached, the insurgents moved to meet them and began guerrilla warfare. The fighting lasted until February 1917, when the Russian corps withdrew as a result of the February Revolution. Meanwhile, Jangeldin was sent to Bukhara in early 1917. After the February Revolution, he returned to Petrograd, whereupon he was sent to the Turgay Oblast as a propagandist.

After the October Revolution, Jangeldin met Vladimir Lenin in Moscow, who appointed him acting commissar of the Turgay Oblast. During the Russian Civil War, Jangeldin gathered pro-Bolshevik forces for Joseph Stalin in the Turgay Oblast in January 1918 to fight against the Alash Autonomy. Jangeldin's units crushed anti-Bolshevik uprisings in Astrakhan and Fort Alexandrovsk on the Caspian Sea. From the Buzachi peninsula, they marched with supplies and ammunition on 300 camels and 600 horses to the Turkestan front. In November 1918, they were in Shalkar and then brought supplies to the Orenburg front. In 1920, military operations there were completed.

== In Soviet Kazakhstan ==
Jangeldin participated in the preparation and work of the Constituent Congress of Kazakh Soviets for the establishment of the Kazakh Republic in 1920. The Congress elected him a member of the Presidium, Vice-chairman of the Central Executive Committee of the Republic and People's Commissar for Social Security. Jangeldin represented the party organization of Kazakhstan at the first All-Russian Conference of Communist Party Organizations of the Peoples of the East in January 1921. In 1937 he became Chairman of the Central Executive Committee of Kazakh SSR.

Following Operation Barbarossa and the Soviet entry into World War II, Jangeldin wrote a letter to Stalin requesting to be sent to the front. But he was refused, since he would be more useful in the rear. During the war, Jangeldin was involved in the formation of military units and formations on the territory of Kazakhstan, the placement of people and equipment evacuated to Kazakhstan from the occupied western regions of the country, and carried out political and propaganda work among those going to the front.

Jangeldin died in 1953. He was buried in the Central Cemetery of Alma-Ata.
