= Amankeldı İmanov =

Kazakh revolutionary (1873–1919)

- امانكەلدى يمانوۆ; Аманкелді Иманов
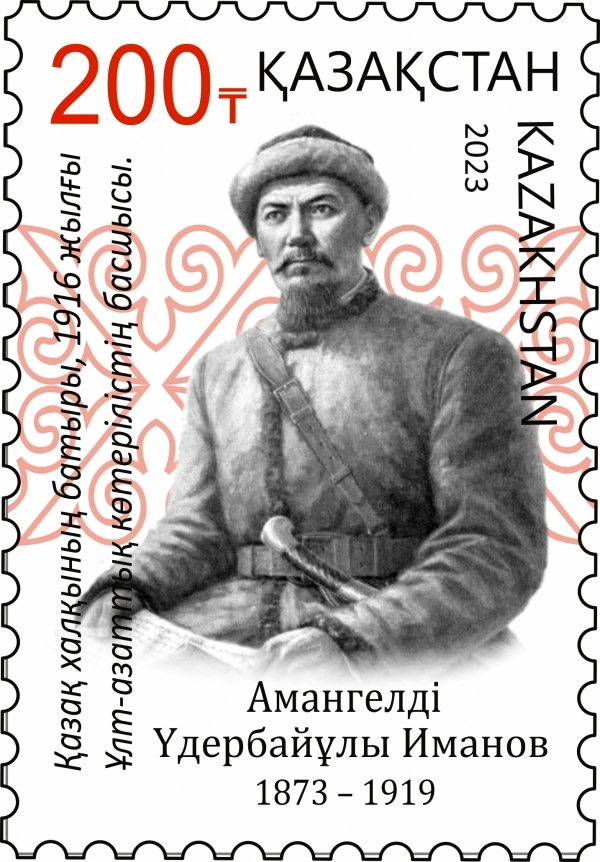
- İmanov on a 2023 stamp of Kazakhstan

Sardarbeg under Äbdiğapar Khan
- In office 21 November 1916 – February 1917
- Khan: Äbdiğapar Janbosynūly
- Preceded by: Position established
- Succeeded by: Position abolished

Personal details
- Born: 3 April 1873 Turgaysky Uyezd, Turgay Oblast, Russian Empire (now Kazakhstan)
- Died: 20 April 1919 (aged 46) Alash Autonomy (now Kazakhstan)
- Nickname: People's Batyr

Military service
- Allegiance: Central Asian revolt; Russian SFSR
- Years of service: 1916–1917; 1917–1919
- Rank: Commander-in-chief (Kazakhstan)
- Battles/wars: Central Asian revolt of 1916; Russian Civil War; Turgai uprising (1919)

Amankeldı Üderbaiūly İmanov (Note: Also written in several different ways according to historical transliterations of Russian or Kazakh.) (Kazakh: Аманкелді Үдербайұлы Иманов; (Note: Kazakh Arabic: امانكەلدى ۇدەربايۇلى يمانوۆ) 3 April [O.S. 22 March] 1873 – 20 April or 18 May 1919), often referred to mononymously as Amankeldı or Amangeldy, was a Kazakh revolutionary who was leader of the Central Asian revolt of 1916 in Kazakhstan. Later fighting alongside the Red Army, he was killed under unclear circumstances in April 1919. He has since emerged as a Kazakh folk hero for his leadership of the revolt.

== Early life ==
Amankeldı Üderbaiūly İmanov was born on 3 April 1873 into a family of poor Qypşaq nomads in the Turgaysky Uyezd of the Turgay Oblast (now the Amangeldi District in Kostanay Region). His grandfather was İman Dulatūly, a Kazakh rebel commander during the Rebellion of Kenesary Kasymov. When Amankeldı was young, he was sent to an aul mullah, where he spent three years before another four-year stint at a madrasa. In this time, he learned Arabic, Persian, and Turkish.

İmanov's early political beliefs were influenced by those of Ybyrai Altynsarin, a Kazakh educator and progressive activist who died when İmanov was 12. It has been claimed by the Great Soviet Encyclopedia that İmanov supported imprisoned Kazakhs in the Russian capital of Saint Petersburg, but evidence has yet to emerge to prove this. He was first arrested by Tsarist authorities in 1896 for inciting Kazakh peasants to armed rebellion against beys, and either remained in prison until 1911 or was imprisoned several times between 1896 and 1908, having participated in the Russian Revolution of 1905.

== Central Asian revolt of 1916 ==
On 25 June 1916, Tsar Nicholas II issued an edict, termed "the requisition" (Russian: реквизиция, romanized: rekvizitsiya). According to the edict, all Kazakhs aged 19 to 43 were to be conscripted for construction of fortifications for the Imperial Russian Army during World War I. Lists of those to be conscripted were created by local leadership, who were susceptible to corruption and would often accept bribes of horses in exchange for removing individuals from conscription lists. The Russian government delayed the requisition to 15 September 1916 amidst popular outcry, but it failed to stem the resentment, and an uprising under İmanov's leadership soon began.

In the early days of the uprising, İmanov connected with several fellow revolutionaries in Turgay Oblast; alongside Alibi Dzhangildin, he showcased films to Kazakhs as incentive to join the revolt. He was selected as Sardarbey (commander-in-chief) of the revolt on 21 November 1916. Under him, there were two Khans: Äbdiğapar Janbosynūly, representing the Qypşaq clan in the eastern half of the oblast, and Ospan Sholakov, representing the western Argyn half. Jangildin served as an impromptu "ideologist" of the revolt, which had by October 1916 grown in size to 50,000 participants across 20 detachments. İmanov personally trained rebels in weaponry and warfare.

The first major battle of the revolt was a siege of the village of Torğai, beginning on 22 October 1916. After 27 days of laying siege to the village, İmanov's armies retreated from approaching Russian troops. The rebels then retreated to Batbakkara, where they continued to engage in guerrilla warfare against the Russian government until its collapse in the February Revolution.

== Russian Revolution and Civil War ==
The February Revolution led to significant political shifts in Kazakhstan, with divisions emerging between nationalist groups. The first was the revolutionaries, led by İmanov, who argued for Kazakh independence from Russia by violent methods. The second was the Alash, led by Alikhan Bukeikhanov, which had sought to negotiate with the Tsar to prevent conscription. İmanov distrusted the Alash, which he viewed as being subservient to the Russian Provisional Government, and aligned himself with the Bolsheviks. This distrust was mutual; Bukeikhanov described İmanov as a "professional horse thief" in a telegram to interior minister Sergey Dmitriyevich Urusov, and felt that İmanov's rise to prominence was accidental. In the summer of 1917, the leaders of the uprising were put to trial. İmanov was sentenced to ten years' exile in Siberia. However, this sentence was never fulfilled. İmanov continued to agitate among the Kazakh peasantry, this time in favour of the Bolsheviks.

When the Russian Civil War began, İmanov joined the Red Army, and worked to establish Red control over Turgay Oblast. He participated in the first Congress of Soviets of Turgay Oblast, and by 4 April 1918 had begun fighting at Orenburg against the Orenburg Cossacks under the command of Alexander Dutov. İmanov's political efforts were soon disrupted by the overthrow of the communist government in Turgay and the establishment of the Alash Autonomy. He returned to guerrilla warfare, commanding partisan troops. When Turgay Oblast was recaptured by the Red Army in mid-December, İmanov was chosen to head the Turgay Military District, and was placed in charge of establishing military units.

== Death ==
On 18 April 1919, İmanov received orders from the Soviet government to link up his detachment with units fighting in Aktobe. Two days later, however, the Alash Autonomy again took control of Turgay Oblast, and İmanov was murdered. The exact circumstances of İmanov's death remain a subject of dispute among historians. Originally, the testimony written in Älıby Jangeldin's diaries, that İmanov was killed by the authorities of the Alash Autonomy, was accepted as objective fact by Soviet historians. Since the dissolution of the Soviet Union, however, Jangeldin's claims have faced opposition from some historians, who claim that he was instead killed by members of the White movement.

İmanov was buried in the village of Alaköl, and left behind two sons, Ramazan and Sharip. Ramazan, who was four years old at the time of Amankeldı's death, later went on to fight and die in World War II.

== Legacy ==
Since his death, İmanov has evolved into a Kazakh folk hero. This evolution was supported by the Soviet government, which painted İmanov as a member of the peasantry responsible for leading an anti-colonial uprising. Books were written in his honour, and villages and streets were renamed after him (such as Amangeldi, formerly known as Batbakkara). İmanov's life was depicted in the 1938 film Amangeldy, where he was portrayed by actor Elubai Ömirzaqov.
