= Outline of Russia during World War I =

Topical guide to Wikipedia articles about Russia during World War I

Russian Eastern Front
- Part of the European theatre of World War I
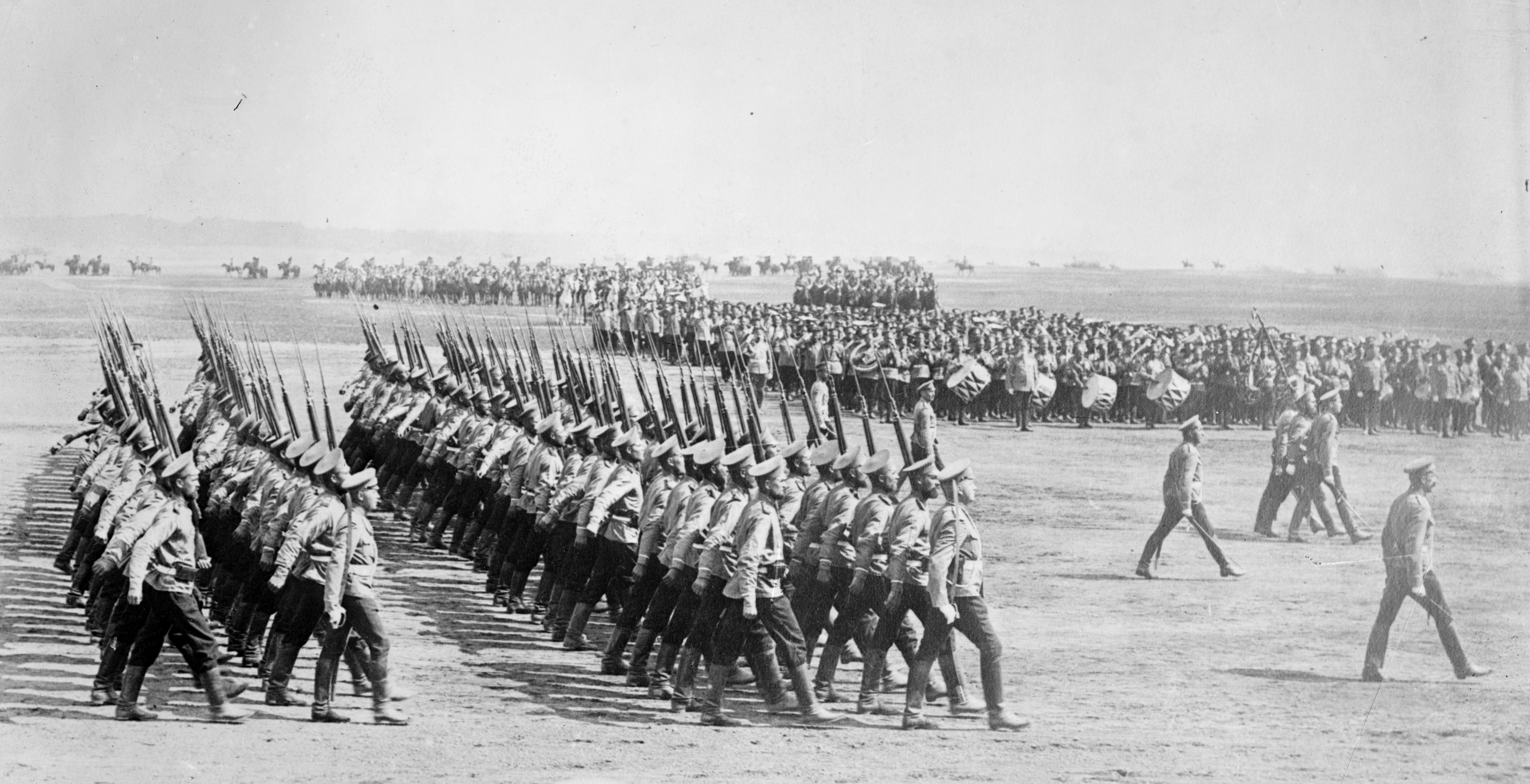
- Russian infantry on the march, c. 1914
Date	1 August 1914 – 3 March 1918
Location	Central and Eastern Europe
Result	Central Powers victory
Territorial changes	Russia renounces Poland, the Baltic governorates and Ukraine and cedes Kars, Ardahan and Batum in the Caucasus under the Treaty of Brest-Litovsk

Belligerents
German Empire; Austria-Hungary; Kingdom of Bulgaria (1916–17); Ottoman Empire (1916–17)	Russian Empire (1914–17); Russian Republic (1917); Soviet Russia (1917–18); Kingdom of Romania (1916–17); Kingdom of Serbia (1914–15); Belgium (1915–17); United Kingdom (1916–17); France (1916–17)

The following outline is provided as an overview of and topical guide to Russia during World War I.

Russia during World War I fought on the Entente side from 1914 to 1918. It fought the German Empire and Austria-Hungary on the Eastern Front and the Ottoman Empire in the Caucasus. Military defeat and food shortages at home led to the Russian Revolution in 1917. The new Bolshevik government then left the war under the Treaty of Brest-Litovsk.

== Overviews ==
- World War I – (1914–1918) – global war in which Russia fought on the Allied side.
- Eastern Front (World War I) – theatre of World War I from the Baltic to the Black Sea.
- Russian Revolution – (1917–1922) – the fall of the monarchy and the Bolshevik seizure of power.
- Aftermath of World War I – Europe after 1918.

== Background ==
- History of Russia (1894–1917) – Russia under Nicholas II.
- Causes of World War I - reasons why the war broke out.
- Home front during World War I - life in the warring states.

=== Governments ===
Allied powers

- Triple Entente - Russia, France and Britain.
- Allies of World War I – the coalition Russia joined in 1914.
  - Russian Empire (1 August 1914–15 March 1917)
  - French Third Republic (3 August 1914–11 November 1918)
  - British Empire (4 August 1914–11 November 1918)
  - Canada (4 August 1914–11 November 1918)
  - Australia (4 August 1914–11 November 1918)
  - Union of South Africa (4 August 1914–11 November 1918)
  - Dominion of New Zealand (4 August 1914–11 November 1918)
  - Dominion of Newfoundland (4 August 1914–11 November 1918)
  - British Raj (4 August 1914–11 November 1918)
  - Kingdom of Italy (23 May 1915–4 November 1918)
  - United States (6 April 1917–11 November 1918)
  - Empire of Japan (23 August 1914–11 November 1918)

Central powers

- Central Powers - the coalition fighting the Allied Powers
  - German Empire (1 August 1914–11 November 1918)
  - Austria-Hungary (28 July 1914–3 November 1918)
  - Ottoman Empire (29 October 1914–30 October 1918)
  - Kingdom of Bulgaria (14 October 1915–29 September 1918)

== Events ==
- Russian entry into World War I - (July 1914)

=== Political events ===
- Assassination of Archduke Franz Ferdinand - (28 June 1914) - killed at Sarajevo.
- July Crisis - (June - August 1914) - period of escalation to war.
- Abdication of Nicholas II - (15 March [O.S. 2 March] 1917) - signed at Pskov.
- July Days - (16 - 20 July [O.S. 3 - 7 July] 1917) - unrest in Petrograd.
- Kornilov affair - (10 - 13 September [O.S. 28 - 31 August] 1917) - failed coup.

=== Military events ===
==== Eastern Front ====
- Eastern front in World War I
- Great Retreat (Russia) - (1915) - withdrawal from Poland and Galicia.
- Lake Naroch offensive - (18-30 March 1916) - failed attack.
- Brusilov offensive - (June-September 1916) - Russian victory.
- Kerensky offensive - (1-19 July [O.S. 18 June - 6 July] 1917) - last Russian offensive.
- Riga offensive (1917) - (1-5 September 1917) - Russian defeat.
- Russian occupation of Eastern Galicia (1914–1915) - Russian military occupation marked by forced Russification and persecution of Jews and Greek Catholics.

===== Battles =====
- Battle of Tannenberg - (26-30 August 1914) - Russian defeat.
- Battle of Galicia - (23 August-11 September 1914) - Russian victory.
- First Battle of the Masurian Lakes - (2-16 September 1914) - Russian defeat.
- Siege of Przemyśl - (September 1914-March 1915) - Russian victory in the second siege.
- Gorlice–Tarnów offensive - (2 May-13 July 1915) - Russian defeat.

==== Caucasus and Persia ====
- Persian campaign (World War I)-(December 1914 - October 1918) - fighting in Iran.
- Caucasus campaign - theater of war with the Ottoman Empire.
- Erzurum offensive - (10 January-16 February 1916) - Erzurum taken by Russian forces.

===== Battles =====
- Battle of Sarikamish - (22 December 1914-17 January 1915) - Russian victory.

=== Uprisings ===
- Central Asian revolt of 1916 - (1916) - popular rising against conscription in Turkestan.
- Jizzakh uprising - July 1916 revolt against Russian colonial rule and wartime labor conscription in present-day Uzbekistan.

=== Terror and war crimes ===
- Abschwangen massacre - massacre of 65 German civilians by Imperial Russian troops in occupied East Prussia on 29 August 1914.
- Deportations from East Prussia during World War I - forced deportation of as many as 13,600 East Prussian civilians to remote areas of the Russian Empire in 1914–1915.
- Karolina Kózka - Polish teenager murdered in November 1914 in an attack believed to have been committed by a Russian soldier; later beatified by the Catholic Church.
- Lwów pogrom (1914) - September 1914 pogrom in which Russian Cossacks attacked Lwów’s Jewish population, killing about 40 civilians.
- Russian occupation of Eastern Galicia (1914–1915) - Russian military occupation marked by forced Russification and persecution of Jews and Greek Catholics.

=== February Revolution ===
- February Revolution - (8 March [O.S. 23 February] 1917) - first revolution of 1917.

=== October Revolution ===
- October Revolution - (7 November [O.S. 25 October] 1917) - Bolsheviks take power.

=== Russian Civil War ===
- Russian Civil War – (1917–1922) – war between the Bolsheviks, the Whites and other factions.

== People ==
=== Political ===
Court

- Nicholas II - (1868–1918) - Russian Tsar, 1894–1917.
- Grand Duke Nicholas Nikolaevich of Russia (born 1856) - (1856–1929) - commander-in-chief, 1914–1915.
- Alexandra Feodorovna (Alix of Hesse) - (1872–1918) - wife of Nicholas II.

Ministers

- Ivan Goremykin (1839–1917) – chairman of the Council of Ministers, 1914–1916.
- Boris Shturmer (1848–1917) – chairman of the Council of Ministers and minister of foreign affairs, 1916.
- Alexander Trepov (1862–1928) – chairman of the Council of Ministers, 1916–1917.
- Nikolai Golitsyn (1850–1925) – chairman of the Council of Ministers, 1917.
- Sergey Sazonov (1860–1927) – minister of foreign affairs, 1910–1916.
- Anatoly Neratov (1863–1938) – acting minister of foreign affairs, 1916.
- Nikolai Pokrovsky (1865–1930) – minister of foreign affairs, 1916–1917.
- Vladimir Sukhomlinov (1848–1926) – minister of war, 1909–1915.
- Alexei Polivanov (1855–1920) – minister of war, 1915–1916.
- Dmitry Shuvayev (1854–1937) – minister of war, 1916–1917.
- Mikhail Belyayev (1863–1918) – minister of war, 1917.
- Pyotr Bark (1869–1937) – finance minister, 1914–1917.
- Ivan Grigorovich (1853–1930) – admiral and naval minister, 1911–1917.
- Alexander Krivoshein (1857–1921) – head of the Main Administration of Land Organization and Agriculture, 1908–1915; chaired the Special Council on Food Supply from 1915.
- Alexander Naumov (1868–1950) – agriculture minister, 1915–1916.
- Aleksei Bobrinsky (1852–1927) – agriculture minister, 1916.
- Alexander Rittikh (1868–1937) – agriculture minister, 1916–1917.
- Nikolay Maklakov (1871–1918) – interior minister, 1912–1915
- Nikolay Shcherbatov (1868–1943) – acting interior minister, 1915
- Alexey Khvostov (1872–1918) – interior minister, 1915–1916
- Boris Shturmer (1848–1917) – interior minister, 1916
- Alexander Khvostov (1857–1921) – interior minister, 1916
- Alexander Protopopov (1866–1918) – interior minister, 1916–1917
- Sergei Rukhlov (1853–1918) – minister of ways of communication, 1909–1915; oversaw the railway system during the first year of the war.
- Alexander Trepov (1862–1928) – minister of ways of communication, 1915–1916.
- Eduard Krieger-Voinovsky (1864–1933) – minister of ways of communication, 1917.
- Vladimir Frederiks (1838–1927) – minister of the Imperial Court, 1897–1917.
- Vladimir Voeikov (1868–1947) – major general and palace commandant, 1913–1917.

=== Military commanders ===
- Mikhail Alekseyev - (1857–1918) - General of the Infantry; chief of staff, 1915–1917.
- Lavr Kornilov - (1870–1918) - General of the Infantry; supreme commander of the Russian Army, 1917.
- Nikolai Ruzsky - (1854–1918) - General of the Infantry; commander of the Northwestern and Northern fronts.
- Nikolai Yudenich - (1862–1933) - General of the Infantry; commander of the Caucasus Army at Erzurum.
- Aleksei Brusilov - (1853–1926) - General of the Cavalry; commander of the Southwestern Front and leader of the 1916 offensive.
- Paul von Rennenkampf - (1854–1918) - General of the Cavalry; commander of the 1st Army in East Prussia.
- Alexander Samsonov - (1859–1914) - General of the Cavalry; commander of the 2nd Army at Tannenberg.

=== Other ===
- Vladimir Lenin – (1870–1924) – Bolshevik leader.
- Leon Trotsky – (1879–1940) – revolutionary and Soviet politician who became the founder and leader of the Red Army.
- Mikhail Rodzianko - (1859–1924) - Russian Duma chairman.
- Georgy Lvov - (1861–1925) - prime minister, March–July 1917.
- Pavel Milyukov - (1859–1943) - liberal politician.
- Alexander Kerensky - (1881–1970) - prime minister, 1917.
- Grigori Rasputin - (1869–1916) - mystic and faith healer.

== Places ==
Cities and regions

- Baltic Sea
- Black Sea
- Brest, Belarus - then Brest-Litovsk; site of the treaty.
- Caucasus
- Congress Poland - Russian-ruled Poland, lost in 1915.
- Courland - western Latvia, occupied by Germany.
- Dardanelles - Ottoman strait to the Mediterranean.
- Erzurum - Anatolian city.
- Galicia (Eastern Europe) - Austrian province held by Russia.
- Mogilev - Stavka headquarters.
- Moscow – Russia's second city and a major industrial base.
- Przemyśl - fortress.
- Pskov - site of the abdication.
- Riga
- Petrograd – the Russian capital.
- Southwestern Front (Russian Empire)
- Tsarskoye Selo - imperial residence near the capital.
- Volhynia
- Warsaw - city in Congress Poland.

Other

- Winter Palace - Romanov residence in the capital.
- Tauride Palace - seat of the Duma.

== Organizations ==
=== Armed forces ===
- Imperial Russian Army
- Imperial Russian Navy
- Imperial Russian Army
- Imperial Russian Navy
- Stavka - the Russian high command.
- Baltic Fleet
- Black Sea Fleet
- Russian Guards
- Cossacks

=== Government ===
- Russian Provisional Government
- State Duma – (1906–1917) – elected lower house of the Russian legislature.
- Russian Constituent Assembly - (18-19 January [O.S. 5 - 6 January] 1918)

=== Political parties ===
- Progressive Bloc (Russia)
- Constitutional Democratic Party
- Socialist Revolutionary Party
- Mensheviks
- Bolsheviks

=== Other ===
- Okhrana - Russian secret police.
- Petrograd Soviet - socialist council in Petrograd.
- Council of People's Commissars - Bolshevik council.

== Miscellaneous ==
- Trans-Siberian Railway - rail link to the Far East.

== Aftermath ==
- Aftermath of World War I – Europe after 1918.
- Russian Revolution - Socialist revolution in Russia.
- Russian Civil War – war between the Bolsheviks, the Whites and other factions.
- Treaty of Brest-Litovsk - 1918 treaty that ended Russia’s participation in World War I.
- Petrograd Soviet Order No. 1 - (14 March [O.S. 1 March] 1917) - the Soviet's first decree.
- Decree on Peace - (8 November [O.S. 26 October] 1917) - call to end the war.
- Armistice of Erzincan - (18 December [O.S. 5 December] 1917) - truce with the Ottomans.
- Allied intervention in the Russian Civil War - (1918) - foreign expeditions to Russia to oppose the Bolsheviks.
- Murder of the Romanov family - (16-17 July 1918) - Royal family murdered at Yekaterinburg.

== Culture and society ==
- Zemgor - (1915-1919) - war relief committee.
- Russian Orthodox Church

== See also ==
- Category:Russian Empire in World War I
- Index of articles related to the Russian Revolution and Civil War
