= Nikolai Sukhomlinov =

Russian general and statesman

- Николай Сухомлинов
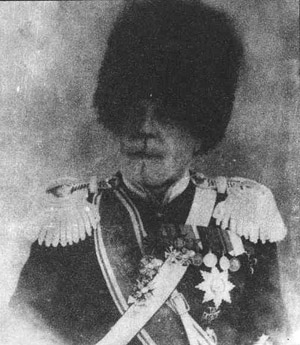

Governor of the Orenburg Governorate
- In office 17 September 1911 – 6 June 1915
- Monarch: Nikolai II
- Prime Minister: Pyotr Stolypin; Vladimir Kokovtsov; Ivan Goremykin; Boris Shturmer
- Preceded by: Vladimir Ozharovsky
- Succeeded by: Lev Pushkin (Acting); Mikhail Tyulin

Governor-General of the Steppes
- In office 6 June 1915 – 17 March 1917
- Monarch: Nikolai II
- Prime Minister: Ivan Goremykin; Boris Sthurmer; Alexander Trepov; Nikolai Golitsyn
- Preceded by: Evgeny Schmidt
- Succeeded by: Position abolished

Chief Attaman of the Siberian Cossacks
- Acting
- In office 1915–1917
- Monarch: Nikolai II
- Prime Minister: Ivan Goremykin; Boris Sthurmer; Alexander Trepov; Nikolai Golitsyn
- Preceded by: Evgeny Schmit
- Succeeded by: Position abolished

Personal details
- Born: 7 August 1850 Volhynia, Russian Empire
- Died: c. 1918 (aged 67–68) Kyiv, Ukrainian People's Republic
- Children: 2
- Education: First Cadet Corps

Military service
- Allegiance: Russian Empire; Russian Republic
- Branch: Imperial Russian Army; White Army
- Years of service: 1868–1918
- Rank: General of the Cavalry
- Battles/wars: Russo-Turkish War; Battle of Gorni Dubnik; Battle of Plovdiv; World War I; Central Asian revolt of 1916; Russian Civil War

Nikolai Aleksandrovich Sukhomlinov (Russian: Николай Александрович Сухомлинов; 7 August 1850 – c. 1918) was a Russian general and statesman who served as the Chief General of the Orenburg Cossacks, Governor of the Orenburg Governorate, Commander of the Omsk Military District and the Chief Ataman of the Siberian Cossacks.

== Biography ==
Nikolay was born on July 27, 1850, in Volhynia as the son of Alexander Pavlovich Sukhomlinov and Olga Ivanovna Lunskaya. His older brother Vladimir Sukhomlinov later became a cavalry general and Minister of War of the Russian Empire.

=== Education ===
He studied at the Brest Cadet Corps during his stay in Vilnius. He graduated from the 1st Petersburg Cadet Corps and the Nicholas Cavalry College in 1866. In July 1868, he was enrolled as a cornet in the Life Guards Lancers of His Majesty's Regiment.

=== Military service ===
In August 1872, he was promoted to lieutenant with approval as head of the regiment's training team, and exactly a year later he received his first award: the Order of Saint Stanislaus, III Class.

During the Russo-Turkish War (1877–1878) he was in the Imperial Russian Army and participated in the Battle of Gorni Dubnik, in the capture of the Telish fortifications, the Battle of Plovdiv, the Battle of Tatar-Bazardzhik, the Battle of San Stefano, all across the Balkans. After the end of the war, he returned to Russia and was appointed a member of the officer court of his Life Guards Ulansky regiment, after which he was in charge of regimental weapons, and on April 12, 1881, he was promoted to captain.

On February 3, 1903, he was promoted to major general with the appointment of commander of the 1st brigade of the 9th Cavalry Division, on January 7, 1909, he was appointed commander of thedivision, on December 6 of the same year he was promoted to lieutenant general with approval as head of the division.

=== Governor ===
On September 4, 1911, he was appointed Governor of Orenburg and chief ataman of the Orenburg Cossacks. He arrived in Orenburg and took office on October 8.

On February 16, 1912, Grand Duke Konstantin Konstantinovich of Russia began to be listed in the Orenburg Cossack arm and on September 23 at the same year, by the permission of Emperor Nikolai II, seniority was assigned to the Cossack Army of 1574 and from the time the voivode Ivan Nagy built the Citadel of Ufa.

In 1913, the Orenburg-Orsk railway was built (the opening of passenger and goods traffic took place on December 19, 1914 ), permission was received to build railways to Ufa and Kazan.

Under Sukhomlinov, education developed in the governate. According to the Orenburg city government, in 1913 there were 5,300 students in the parochial schools of the city alone and more than a quarter of the city budget of 250,0000 rubles was spent on public education. In 1914, the city government requested 280,500 rubles from the Duma.

Sukhomlinov also developed the collection of donations for the construction of a museum in the Orenburg Territory. While this was going on, there were efforts to open a court of justice, as well as proposals of a monument in Orenburg of Tsar Alexander II were put on the agenda. Another achievement was the first steamship of the Finnish Laihia Brothers Society, Uralets arrived from Uralsk on May 28, 1914.

The announcement of mobilization in Orenburg became known on July 17, 1914, at 19:00, and on the morning of July 18, the decree on mobilization was published in all local newspapers. A week after the announcement of mobilization, the first secondary regiments of the Orenburg Cossacks were sent to the deployment areas of the Imperial Russian Army. Following them from July 30 to August 7, the regiments of the third stage went from the 13th to the 18th.

From the first days of the war, the construction of hospitals and ambulance trains began in the region however the difficult military and political situation in the country led to complications in the Orenburg region as the flow of refugees increased, wages fell, and there was a shortage of housing which led to at least 6 strikes in 1915.

On May 24, 1915, Sukhomlinov was appointed Governor-General of the Steppes, commander of the troops of the Omsk Military District, and Ataman of the Siberian Cossacks. On April 10, 1916, he was promoted to General of the Cavalry.

After receiving information about the abdication of the Tsar and the formation of the Russian Provisional Government, Sukhomlinov, like some other high-ranking officials, were arrested by the decision of the Omsk Soviet of Workers' and Military Deputies. The arrest took place on the night of March 3–4, 1917. After his arrest, he was sent under escort to Petrograd.

He was married to the daughter of the Privy Councilor Kruze Zinaida Alexandrovna. Had two children: Vladimir (1882) and George (1890).

The date of Sukhomlinov's death is unknown although according to one source, he was shot by the Bolsheviks. According to another source, he died in Kiev from typhus.

== Awards ==
- Order of Saint Stanislaus, III Class (1873)
- Order of Saint Anna, III Class with swords and bow (1878)
- Order of Saint Stanislaus, II Class with swords (1878)
- Order of Saint Vladimir, IV Class with swords and bow (1878)
- Order of Saint Vladimir, III class (1893)
- Order of Saint Stanislaus, I Class (1905)
- Order of Saint Anna, I Class (1912)
- Order of Saint Vladimir, II Class (June 12, 1915)
- The Highest Gratitude (April 6, 1914)

=== Foreign awards ===
- Germany: Order of the Red Eagle, II Class
- Romania: Iron Cross of Romania (1879)
