= Semipalatinsk Oblast =

Semipalatinsk Oblast may refer to:

- Semipalatinsk Oblast, Russia (1854–1920), an administrative division of the Russian Empire and the early Russian SFSR
- Semipalatinsk Oblast, Kazakhstan (1939–1997), an administrative division of the Kazakh SSR and the Republic of Kazakhstan
