= Ivan Belov (commander) =

Soviet military commander (1893–1938)

Ivan Panfilovich Belov
- Born: 27 June 1893; Russian Empire
- Died: 29 June 1938 (aged 45) Soviet Union
- Allegiance: Russian Empire; Soviet Union
- Branch: Imperial Russian Army; Soviet Red Army
- Service years: 1913–1917 (Russian Empire); 1918–1938 (Soviet Union)
- Rank: Komandarm 1st rank
- Commands: North Caucasus Military District; Leningrad Military District; Moscow Military District
- Conflicts: World War I Russian Civil War

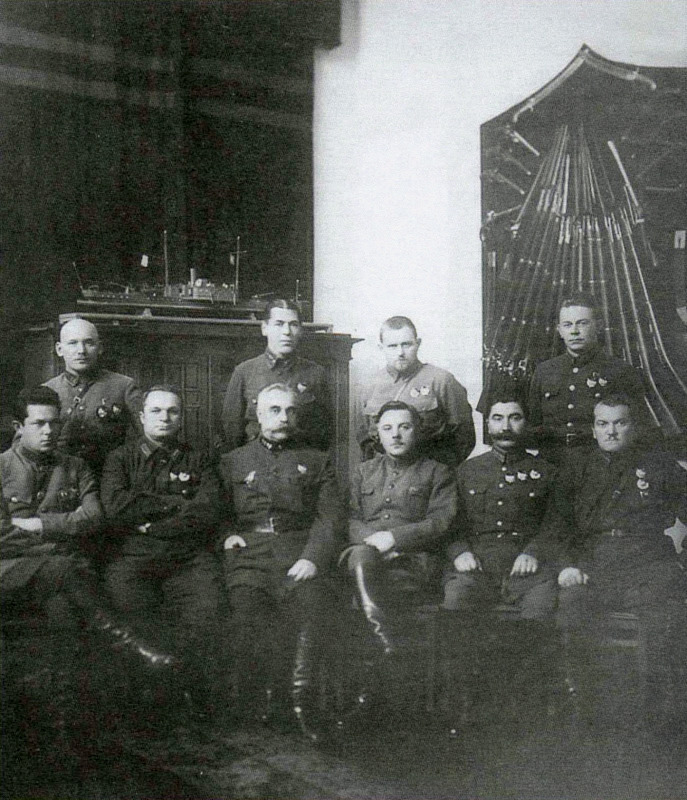
Members of Military Revolutionary Council of the USSR, Belov being 2nd from right in the back row

Ivan Panfilovich Belov (Russian: Ива́н Панфи́лович Бело́в; 27 June 1893 – 29 June 1938) was a Soviet military commander and Komandarm 1st rank. He was a member of the Central Executive Committee of the USSR (1929–1937), a deputy of the Supreme Soviet of the USSR of the first convocation (1937–1938), and a member of the Military Council under the People's Commissar of Defense of the USSR. He was executed during the mass purge of the Red Army (July 29, 1938). After Stalin's death, he was rehabilitated (November 26, 1955).

== Early years ==
He was born in the village of Bolshoye Kalinnikovo in what is now the Cherepovets district in the Vologda Oblast on June 15, 1893. He graduated from the 4th grade of the Vakhonkinsky elementary school, but, due to the poverty of his family, he was forced to interrupt his studies. He worked for hire on the railway, in logging, as a loader in the port of Arkhangelsk. Through self-education, he managed to prepare and pass the examination for the position of teacher at the Cherepovets Teachers' Seminary.

In 1913 he was drafted into the Russian Imperial Army and sent to the 13th Siberian Rifle Regiment. He participated in the First World War as a non-commissioned officer. After recovering from a concussion he was sent to the 1st Siberian Reserve Regiment in the city of Tashkent, Turkestan Krai. He was sentenced by a military court in 1916 to four and a half years in a disciplinary battalion for insulting an officer, then released during the February Revolution.

== Revolutionary activities ==
In February 1917 he joined the party of Left Socialist-Revolutionaries. In September 1917, Belov was elected chairman of the soldiers' committee of the 1st Siberian reserve rifle regiment in Tashkent, which he commanded during the armed uprising in Tashkent in October 1917 and in the liquidation of the Provisional Government of Autonomous Turkistan in 1918.

I.P. Belov was a member of the Tashkent Council in 1917–1919 and a member of the Turkestan Central Executive Committee in 1918–1921. In March 1918 he was appointed commandant of Tashkent Fortress and head of the Tashkent garrison. He played a key role in suppression of the anti-Soviet rebellion in Tashkent in January 1919 led by Konstantin Osipov. After the suppression of the rebellion, he left the Left Socialist-Revolutionary Party and joined the Bolshevik Party. From April to October 1919, Belov was the commander-in-chief of the troops of the newly created Turkestan Autonomous Soviet Socialist Republic.

In January–July 1920, Belov was the head of the 3rd Turkestan Rifle Division in Semirechye, where he participated in the suppression of the Verny uprising. In August 1920 to September 1921, he commanded the troops which carried out the Bukhara operation, for which he received the Order of the Red Banner. He also participated in the suppression of the Kronstadt rebellion in March 1921, for which he was awarded his second order.

== Soviet career ==
After the Civil War, I.P. Belov commanded the 2nd Don and 22nd Krasnodar rifle divisions (April–June 1922). In 1923 he graduated from the Military Academic Courses for the Higher Command Staff of the Red Army at the Military Academy of the Red Army. From 1923 to 1925 he successively commanded the 15th, 9th and 2nd rifle corps. In July 1925 he became assistant commander of the Moscow military district, then became commander of the North Caucasian military district in 1927. He led two large-scale KGB troop operations to disarm the Chechens and Karachays in December 1929 and March 1930.

From June 1931 to September 1935 he was Commander of the Leningrad Military District. In September 1935 he was appointed Commander of the Moscow Military District, then in June 1937 became Commander of the Belarusian Military District.

== The Great Purge ==
He was a member of the Military Collegium, the special tribunal established by the Supreme Court of the USSR in the case of Mikhail Tukhachevsky and others to hear the Case of the Trotskyist Anti-Soviet Military Organization, in June 1937. One of the judges was heard to comment, "Tomorrow I'll be put in the same place."

That came to pass in I.P. Belov's case on January 7, 1938, when he was arrested on charges of spying for Germany and belonging to a "military socialist-revolutionary organization." Found guilty by the Military Collegium, he was sentenced to death and was shot on the day of the verdict on July 29, 1938.

I. P. Belov was rehabilitated by the decision of the Military Collegium of the Supreme Court of the USSR on November 26, 1955.

== Ranks held ==
Preceded by Ieronim Uborevich	Commander of the North Caucasus Military District; 1927–1931	Succeeded by Nikolai Kashirin
Preceded by Mikhail Tukhachevsky	Commander of the Leningrad Military District; 1931–1935	Succeeded by Boris Shaposhnikov
Preceded by Boris Gorbachyov	Commander of the Moscow Military District; 1936–1937	Succeeded by Semyon Budyonny

== Bibliography ==
- Robert Conquest: The Great Terror. Soviet Union 1934–1938. 2. Aufl. Langen Müller, Munich 1993, ISBN 3-7844-2415-5.
- Géorgi N. Golikov, M. I. Kusnezow: Lexikon der großen sozialistischen Oktoberrevolution ("Malenkaja Encyclopedia Velikaja Oktjabrskaja Socialisticeskaja Revoljucia"). Bibliographisches Institute, Leipzig 1976.
- Donald Rayfield: Stalin and his hangmen. Blessing-Verlag, Munich 2004, ISBN 3-89667-181-2.
- Heinrich E. Schulz u.a. (Hrsg.): Who was Who in the USSR. Scarecrow Press, Metuchen, N.J. 1972, ISBN 0-8108-0441-7.
