= Äbdiğapar Janbosynūly =

Kazakh revolutionary (1870–1919)

Abd Al-Ghaffar Janbosynūly
- ٴابدىعاپار جانبوسىنۇلى
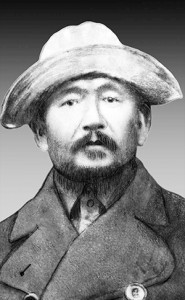

Khan of the Qypşaq Kazakhs (Note: Subsequently renounced the title of khan and accepted the title of emir)
- In office 21 November 1916 – February 1917
- Sardarbeg: Amankeldı İmanov
- Preceded by: Position established
- Succeeded by: Position abolished

Personal details
- Born: 1870 Turgay Oblast, Russian Empire (now Kazakhstan)
- Died: 21 November 1919 (aged 48–49)

Military service
- Years of service: 1916–1917
- Rank: Khan, Emir
- Battles/wars: Central Asian revolt of 1916; Russian Civil War

Äbdiğapar Janbosynūly (Kazakh: ٴابدىعاپار جانبوسىنۇلى Cyrillic: Әбдіғапар Жанбосынұлы; 1870 – 21 November 1919) was a Kazakh revolutionary and military commander who was elected as Khan of the Qypşaq clan during the Central Asian revolt of 1916.

== Early life ==
Äbdiğapar Janbosynūly was born in 1870 in Turgay Oblast, in the Russian Empire. He was part of the Qypşaq clan. He claimed descent from Niyaz Tıleuıūly, a Kazakh bey, and received an Islamic education. Prior to the Central Asian revolt of 1916, he was involved in farming and irrigation, and had been responsible for opening a school in his village.

== Central Asian revolt of 1916 ==
With the beginning of the revolt, Janbosynūly was elected as Khan of the Qypşaq. In this position, he controlled the eastern half of the revolt, with Ospan Şolaqūly controlling the western half, under the Argyn clan. In spite of his theoretical political role, he delegated most power to his elected council of twenty representatives, focusing on military matters.

Janbosynūly's troops laid siege to the village of Torğai on 22 October 1916, but abandoned the siege to fight with Russian troops. Afterwards, rebel troops launched a strategic retreat to Batbakkara Raion (now Amangeldi District) and engaged in guerrilla warfare against Russian troops. During this time, Şolaqūly's troops were defeated by Russian forces. Janbosynūly continued fighting until the February Revolution, when his troops stood down.

== Later life and death ==
After the end of the Central Asian revolt, Janbosynūly remained politically active, partaking in the establishment of a soviet in Orenburg during the Russian Civil War. However, his relationship with the Bolsheviks soon soured, and in November 1919, he was executed, possibly due to his descent from Kazakh nobility.
