= Turgai uprising =

Episode of the Russian Civil War

- Part of Russian Civil War
- Location of Turgai in the Russian Empire.
Date	April 1919
Location	Turgai, Kazakhstan
Result	Alash victory

Belligerents
(Russian Soviet Federative Socialist Republic) Russian SFSR	Alash-Orda

Commanders and leaders
(Russian Soviet Federative Socialist Republic) Amankeldı İmanov (executed) (Russian Soviet Federative Socialist Republic) Lavrenty Taran (executed)	Mirjaqip Dulatuli

Strength
337	Unknown

Casualties and losses
Entire force	Unknown

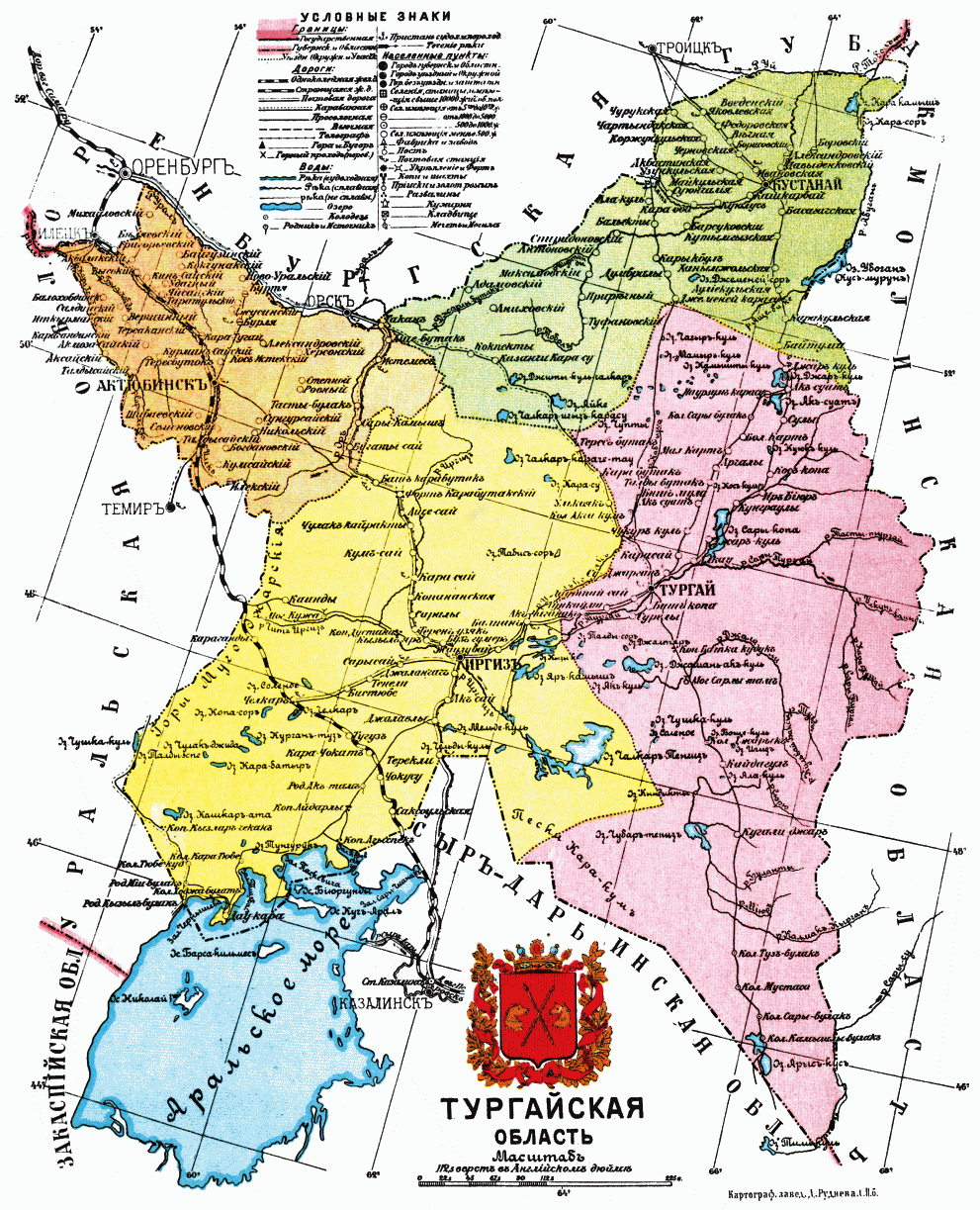
Map of Turgai Oblast, 1913

The Turgai uprising is an episode of the Russian Civil War in April 1919, when Kazakh autonomists organised a successful uprising against the Bolsheviks in Northwestern Kazakhstan.

== Background ==
In 1918, Extraordinary Military Commissar of the Steppe Territory, Alibi Dzhangildin delivered weapons and ammunition from central Russia to the Aktobe front, thanks to which the Bolsheviks were able to intensify their activities in the Aktobe Region in Kazakhstan. In November 1918, Soviet power was established in Turgai.

== Uprising ==
In the spring of 1919, the offensive of Kolchak's troops on the Eastern Front began. Deciding that the defeat of the Soviet troops was close, in April 1919, members of the Alash party rebelled in Turgai and arrested the military commissar of the Turgai district Amankeldı İmanov.

At this time, a detachment of Red partisans from Kostanay, consisting of 337 men under the command of the chairman of the executive committee of the Kostanay Soviet, Lavrenty Taran, approached Turgai. On April 22, the detachment was disarmed by the Alash Horde, and its leaders were arrested.

== Results and consequences ==
Soon after Taran's detachment, a second detachment under command of Zhilyayev, arrived from Kostanay in Turgai. It defeated the Orda Alash troops and captured Turgai. Retreating, the Alash Orda troops carried out the execution of the captured Red commanders.

After the departure of Zhelaev's detachment to Yrgyz, Turgai was again occupied by the Alash-Orda.The Alash detachment then came under the operational control of the White Orenburg Cossacks detachment under the command of Staff Captain Mogilev. Mogilev's detachment arrived in Turgai and pursued the Red partisan detachment of Zhilyayev. Subsequently, within two months, Mogilev’s detachment, with the participation of the Alash regiment, had also liberated Yrgyz and Shalkar from the Reds
