= Communist Party of Turkestan =

Communist Party of Turkestan Коммунистическая партия Туркестана
- Leader: Pyotr Kobozev (1919); Nazir Turiakylov (1920–1922); Abdullo Rakhimbayev (1920–1921, 1922); Ferdinand Svetlov (1923–1924)
- Founded: June 1918
- Dissolved: February 1924
- Ideology: Communism; Marxism; Leninism
- National affiliation: Russian Communist Party (Bolsheviks)

The Communist Party of Turkestan (Russian: Коммунистическая партия Туркестана, romanized: Kommunisticheskaya partiya Turkestana; Uzbek: Turkiston Kommunistik partiyasi; Tajik: Ҳизби Коммунистии Туркистон, romanized: Hizbi Kommunistii Turkiston; Kyrgyz: Түркстан коммунисттик партиясы, romanized: Türkstan kommunisttik partiyasy) was a branch of the Russian Communist Party (Bolsheviks) which operated in the Turkestan Autonomous Soviet Socialist Republic. It was formed in June 1918. At the time of its formation, the party was joined by a large section of Jadids.

In the spring of 1919 the RCP(b) leadership stressed "particular care and attention" toward "the remnants of national feelings of the toiling masses of the oppressed or dependent nations." Thus the Muslim Bureau (Musbiuro) of the Territorial Committee of the Communist Party of Turkestan was formed. Turar Rïsqulov, a Kazakh from Awliya Ata, was elected as the Chairman of Musbiuro.

In 1920 the 5th Territorial Congress of the Communist Party of Turkestan was held. The congress suggested that a unified Turkic Soviet Republic be formed, a demand that was later ignored by the RCP(b).

In line with the line of attracting the Muslim masses to the party, the party employed different criteria on religious activities of Muslim and Orthodox members. In 1922, 1500 Russian Orthodox were purged from the Communist Party of Turkestan on the grounds of 'religious prejudice', but not a single Muslim.

In 1924 the Communist Party of Turkestan was dissolved, as the boundaries of Soviet Central Asia were re-drawn.

== Ethnic composition ==
As of 1922, the party membership was composed of:

	Number	%
Russians	9,424	49.7
Kazakh/Kyrgyz	4,409	23.3
Uzbek	2,021	10.7
Turkmen	867	4.6
Tajik	421	2.2
Others (Tatar, Karakalpak, etc.)	1,803	9.5
Total	18,945	

== See also ==
- Ush Zhuz
