= Belarus Governorate-General =

Governorate-general of the Russian Empire

The Belarus Governorate-General (Russian: Белорусское генерал-губернаторство, romanized: Belorusskoye general-gubernatorstvo) was a Governorate-General of the Russian Empire established on December 12, 1796. Its capital was Vitebsk.

Since the reform of February 27 1802 it was named Витебское и Могилёвское генерал-губернаторство and included Vitebsk Governorate and Mogilev Governorate

Since 1823 in included the Smolensk Governorate and accordingly renamed to Витебское, Могилёвское и Смоленское генерал-губернаторство.

It was abolished on February 17, 1856.
