= Battle of Makanchi =

- Part of Russian Civil War
Date	28 July – 2 August 1918
Location	Makanchi
Result	Alash–White victory
Territorial changes	Alash–White occupation of Makanchi

Belligerents
White Army; Alash-Orda	Russian SFSR

Commanders and leaders
Cap. Vinogradov †; Col. Vyatkin; Col. Yarushin; Col. Bychkov; Otynshy Alzhanov †; Sadyk Amanzholov	Efim Mamontov †; Pyotr Mamontov; Denis Kikhtenko

Strength
Vyatkin's unit: – 450 armed and 120 unarmed, 4 machine guns	Unknown

Casualties and losses
40 killed	100 killed

The Battle of Makanchi (28 July – 2 August 1918) was a military action during the Russian Civil War, involving military actions between the White Army and the Red Army near the Makanchi settlement in the East Kazakhstan Region. This confrontation not only had immediate military repercussions but also influenced subsequent political and social developments within the region.

== Background ==
With the liberation of Sergiopol from the Reds, the leadership of the regional Semirechensk council of Alash-Orda asked the White Army command to assist in the formation of Alash armed detachments. On the instructions of the chairman of the regional council of Alash-Orda Dzhainakov Ibrahim, Otynshy Alzhanov and Sadyk Amanzholov, to coordinate the Alash detachments in Bakhty and Chuguchak, were sent in the direction of Urjar-Makanchi-Bakhty, together with Vinogradov's detachment.

== Battle ==
On 26 July Captain Vinogradov's detachment took the village of Urjarskaya and, continuing the offensive, on 28 July came to the village of Makanchi for overnight stay.

On the morning of 29 July, a detachment of Red Army soldiers under the command of Ivan Egorovich Mamontov suddenly attacked Makanchi. During the fierce battle, the Whites lost about 40 men killed, Captain N.D. Vinogradov was mortally wounded. In this battle O. Alzhanov was killed and S. Amanzholov was seriously wounded. The Red Army lost about 100 men killed, including their commander I.E. Mamontov.

I.E. Mamontov's detachment was commanded by his brother, P. Mamontov, and then by D. Kikhtenko. The Red Army again occupied Urjar and Makanchi, but soon found themselves squeezed from two sides – Yarushin's detachment from Sergiopol and Semirechye Cossacks of Colonel Vyatkin and voy Starshina Bychkov, who came up from China. After several combat clashes, Mamontov and Kikhtenko's detachment was forced to leave Trakt Sergiopol-Bakhty and retreat southwards to Usharal and then to Sarkan.

Uniting under the command of the former ataman of the Semirechen Cossacks, Colonel N.N. Vyatkin, the Cossacks captured the border fortification of Bakhty at the end of July. 2 August Vyatkin's detachment, which numbered 450 armed and 120 unarmed men with 4 machine guns, marched from Bakhty, and in the evening of the same day occupied Makanchi. The village was almost completely burned down by the departing Red Army.

The detachments of Colonels Yarushin and Vyatkin, having united in Urzhar District and having knocked out the Reds from there, continued the offensive to the south of the region, rushing to help the rebellious stanitsa.

== See also ==
- Bibliography of the Russian Revolution and Civil War
- Outline of the Russian Revolution and Civil War
- Index of articles related to the Russian Revolution and Civil War
- The "Russian" Civil Wars, 1916–1926: Ten Years That Shook the World
- Russia in Flames: War, Revolution, Civil War, 1914–1921
- Russia in Revolution: An Empire in Crisis, 1890 to 1928
- Russia: Revolution and Civil War, 1917—1921
- The Russian Revolution: A New History
