= Jizzakh uprising =

- Part of the Central Asian revolt of 1916
Date	July 1916
Location	Jizzakh, Uzbekistan
Result	Russian victory: Uprising suppressed
Territorial changes	Demonstrated widespread discontent within Russian Turkestan

Belligerents
Uzbek rebels	Russian Empire

Commanders and leaders
Nazir Ishan (executed)	(Russian Empire) Col. Rukin †

Strength
Unknown	13 companies 6 cannons

Casualties and losses
34 captured	+83 killed 70 captured

The Jizzakh Uprising was a revolt against Russian colonial rule in Jizzakh (modern-day Uzbekistan) in July 1916. It was part of the larger Central Asian revolt of 1916, which erupted in response to Nicholas II decree conscripting the local population into labor battalions to support Russia's war effort in World War I.

== Background ==
The Russian conquest of Central Asia during the 19th century imposed a colonial regime upon the peoples of Central Asia. Central Asia's inhabitants were being heavily taxed by Russian authorities. Emperor Nicholas II adopted the "requisition of foreigners" for rear work in the front-line areas of the First World War.

The discontent of the people fueled the unfair distribution of land, as well as the call of Muslim leaders to do Jihad against Russian colonial rule.

== The uprising ==
Over 83 Russian settlers were killed and 70 Russian women and children were taken prisoner in Jizzakh. The news about the uprising led to even more uprisings around Central Asia. Colonel Rukin, a Russian officer, was killed by the rebels. A Russian army consisting of 13 companies and 6 cannons were dispatched from Tashkent to crush the uprising and avenge the fallen general.

The force retook the Russian settlement of Zomin and Jizzakh, causing many native civilian deaths. The revolt was put down on July 26, lasting for two weeks. In total, 34 people were taken prisoner, including Nazir, the leader of the revolt. He was sentenced to death by hanging. 4 of the prisoners were sent to labor camps, 27 were sentenced to 4 years of prison. On August 20, General Aleksey Kuropatkin issued the following statement.

“We should hang all of you, but we let you live for you to be a dissuasive example to others. The place where Colonel Rukin was killed will be razed to zero over a distance of 5 versts and this area will become state property. We must not wait to expel the population living on the territory.” - Aleksey Kuropatkin

== Aftermath ==
The suppression of the uprising led to widespread destruction, including the burning of villages, decimation of crops, and displacement of communities. The violence disrupted agricultural activities, resulting in severe food shortages and starvation among the survivors.

Russian authorities implemented punitive measures, such as land seizures from local inhabitants, further exacerbating tensions and hardships in the region. However, this led to corruption and weakening of Russian Turkestan.
