= Irgizsky Uyezd =

Irgizsky Uyezd (Ирги́зский уезд) was one of the subdivisions of the Turgay Oblast of the Russian Empire. It was situated in the southwestern part of the oblast. Its administrative centre was Irgiz (Yrgyz).

== Demographics ==
At the time of the Russian Empire Census of 1897, Irgizsky Uyezd had a population of 98,697. Of these, 98.4% spoke Kazakh, 0.9% Russian, 0.5% Tatar and 0.1% Uzbek as their native language.
