= Governorate-General (Russian Empire) =

1775–1917 subdivision of Russia

- Category: Subdivision of a unitary state
- Location: Russian Empire
- Created: 1775–1917
- Subdivisions: Governorates (Note: Usually three govenorates per Governorate-General)

Governorate-General (Note: Russian: генерал-губернаторство, romanized: generál-gubernátorstvo, IPA: [ɡʲɪnʲɪˌraɫgʊbʲɪrˈnatərstvə]) was a type of administrative-territorial division in the Russian Empire which existed from 1775 until the empire's collapse in 1917. A governorate-general usually comprised a set of guberniyas (governorates) and oblasts (regions). The term was also occasionally used to refer to a krai or a military governorate. The governorates of Moscow and Saint Petersburg had been administered in a similar fashion since the early 18th century; however, the system was formally defined and expanded across the empire as a distinct administrative tier in 1775.

The institution was introduced during the administrative reforms of Catherine the Great following the Pugachev Rebellion (1773–1775), which revealed weaknesses in regional control. The system aimed to strengthen imperial governance and military oversight in border and strategic territories.

== Description ==
Each governorate-general was headed by a governor-general, who typically held a high military rank. The role of the Governor-General was to supervise the governors of the constituent guberniyas and oblasts. They did not typically participate directly in local administration, with the notable exceptions of the capital cities of Moscow and Saint Petersburg.

Governors-general exercised authority over the civil administration, local police, and military units within their territories. Reporting directly to the Emperor of Russia and the Ministry of Internal Affairs, they also had the power to suspend local officials and issue binding decrees in emergencies.

== List of Governorates-General ==
- Saint Petersburg Governorate-General (1708–1917)
- Moscow Governorate-General (1709–1917)
- Azov Governorate-General (1775–1783)
- Baltic Governorate-General (1801–1876)
- Belarus Governorate-General (1796–1856)
- Lithuania Governorate-General (1794–1912)
- Kiev Governorate-General (1832–1912)
- Malorossiya Governorate-General (1802–1856)
- Novorossiya-Bessarabia Governorate-General (1802–1873)
- Orenburg Governorate-General (1851–1881)
- Siberia Governorate-General (1802–1822), later divided into:
  - West Siberia Governorate-General (1822–1882)
  - East Siberia Governorate-General (1822–1884), later divided into:
    - Amur Governorate-General (1884–1917)
    - Irkutsk Governorate-General (1887–1917)
- Warsaw Governorate-General (governing the Vistula Krai) (1874–1917)
- Turkestan Governorate-General (1867–1918)
- Steppe Governorate-General (1882–1918)

=== Viceroyalties and other equivalent territories ===
The following territories were also administered by an official with the rank of Governor-General but possessed a distinct political status:

- Caucasus Viceroyalty: A viceroyalty with greater administrative powers and autonomy.
- Grand Duchy of Finland: An autonomous state in personal union with the Empire, whose head was the Governor-General of Finland.
- Galicia Governorate-General: A temporary military administration established during World War I over conquered Austro-Hungarian territory.

== Abolition ==
The system of Governorates-General was a core component of the Russian Empire's administrative and military control. Following the February Revolution of 1917, the Russian Provisional Government began dismantling the old imperial structure, replacing many governors-general with its own commissars. The process was completed after the October Revolution, as the Bolsheviks abolished all remnants of the tsarist administrative system in favor of the Soviet model of governance. The last Governorates-General ceased to exist by 1918.

== See also ==
- Guberniya
- History of the administrative division of Russia
- List of governorates of the Russian Empire
