= Aktyubinsky Uyezd =

Aktyubinsky Uyezd (Актюбинский уезд) was one of the subdivisions of the Turgay Oblast of the Russian Empire. It was situated in the western part of the oblast. Its administrative centre was Aktyubinsk (Aktobe).

== Demographics ==
At the time of the Russian Empire Census of 1897, Aktyubinsky Uyezd had a population of 115,215. Of these, 95.1% spoke Kazakh, 2.8% Russian, 0.9% Ukrainian, 0.7% Tatar, 0.3% Bashkir and 0.1% Mordvin as their native language.
