= Kustanaysky Uyezd =

Kustanaysky Uyezd (Кустанайский уезд) was one of the subdivisions of the Turgay Oblast of the Russian Empire. It was situated in the northern part of the governorate. Its administrative centre was Kustanay (Kostanay).

== Demographics ==
At the time of the Russian Empire Census of 1897, Kustanaysky Uyezd had a population of 152,556. Of these, 77.4% spoke Kazakh, 16.9% Russian, 2.3% Ukrainian, 1.3% Mordvin, 1.1% Tatar and 0.8% Bashkir as their native language.
