= Bolshoye Kalinnikovo =

Bolshoye Kalinnikovo Большое Калинниково
- Village
- Location within Vologda Oblast Location within Russia
- Coordinates: 59°24′N 37°48′E
- Country: Russia
- Region: Vologda Oblast
- District: Cherepovetsky District
- Time zone: UTC+3:00

Bolshoye Kalinnikovo (Russian: Большое Калинниково) is a rural locality (a village) in Voskresenskoye Rural Settlement, Cherepovetsky District, Vologda Oblast, Russia. The population was 11 as of 2002.

== Geography ==
Bolshoye Kalinnikovo is located 43 km (27 mi) northwest of Cherepovets (the district's administrative centre) by road. Maloye Kalinnikovo is the nearest rural locality.
