= Battle of Philippopolis =

Battle of Philippopolis or Battle of Plovdiv may refer to:

- Siege of Philippopolis (250)
- Battle of Philippopolis (1208)
- Battle of Philippopolis (1878)
