= Semipalatinsk Oblast, Russia =

Coordinates: 50.4111°N 80.2275°E

Semipalatinsk Oblast
- Oblast of the Russian Empire
- 1854–1920
- Coat of arms

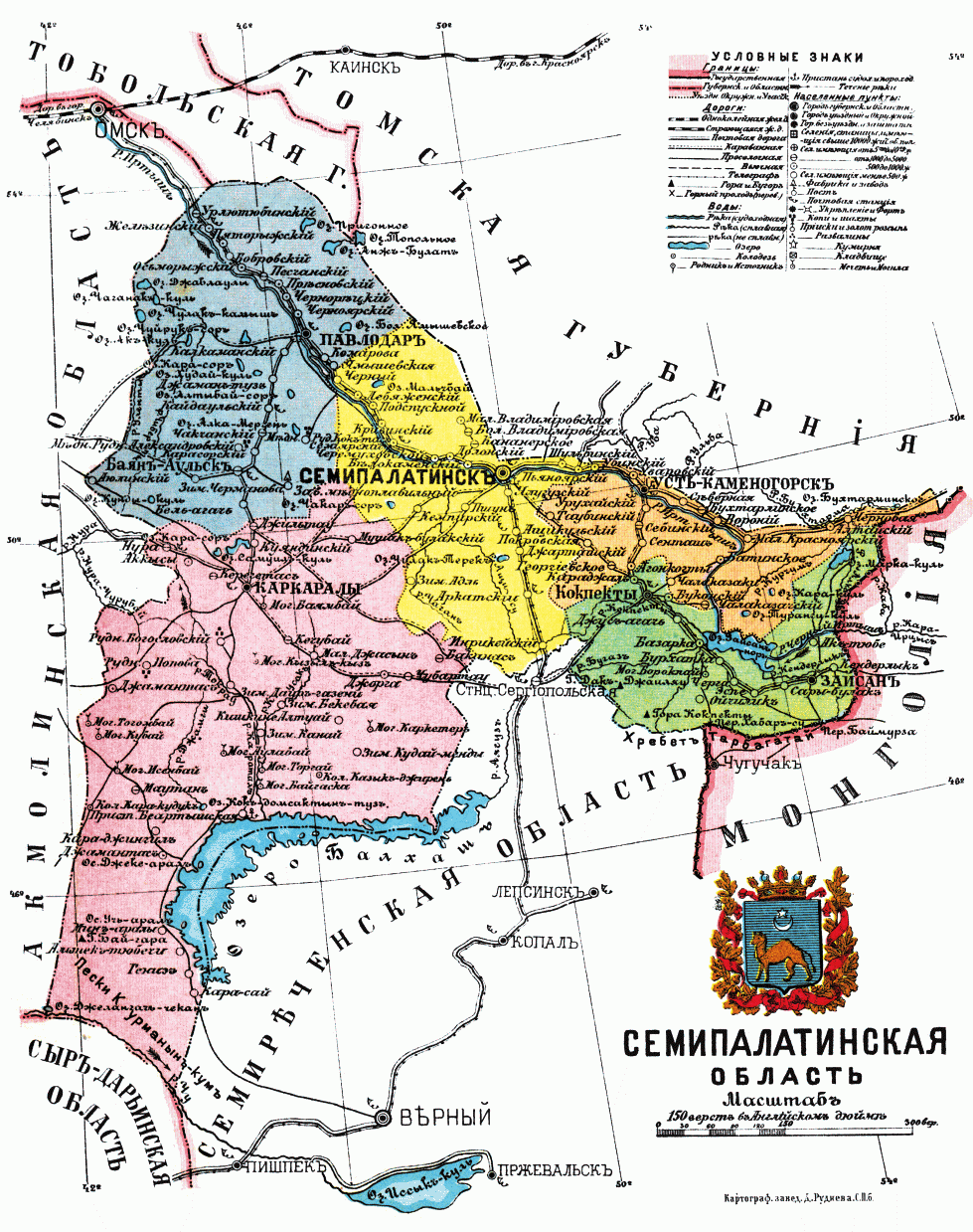
- Capital: Semipalatinsk
- History
  - Established: 19 May 1854
  - Disestablished: 11 December 1920
- Today part of: Kazakhstan

The Semipalatinsk Oblast (Russian: Семипалатинская область) was an oblast (province) of the Russian Empire and the early Russian SFSR. From 1882 to 1917 it was part of the Governor-Generalship of the Steppes. It roughly corresponded to most of present-day northeastern Kazakhstan. It was created out of the territories of the former Kazakh Khanate. The first Russian settlement in the area dates from 1718, when Russia built a fort beside the river Irtysh, near the ruins of an ancient Buddhist monastery, where seven buildings could be seen. The fort (and later the city) was named Semipalatinsk (Russian for "Seven-Chambered City") after the monastery. The city is now known as Semey.

== Demographics ==
As of 1897, 684,590 people populated the oblast. Kazakhs constituted the majority of the population. Significant minorities consisted of Russians and Tatars. Total Turkic speaking were 614,999(89,8%).

=== Ethnic groups in 1897 ===
TOTAL	684,590	100%
Kazakhs	604,564	88.3%
Russians	65,062	9.5%
Tatars	9,940	1.5%
