= Tashkent anti-Soviet revolt of 1919 =

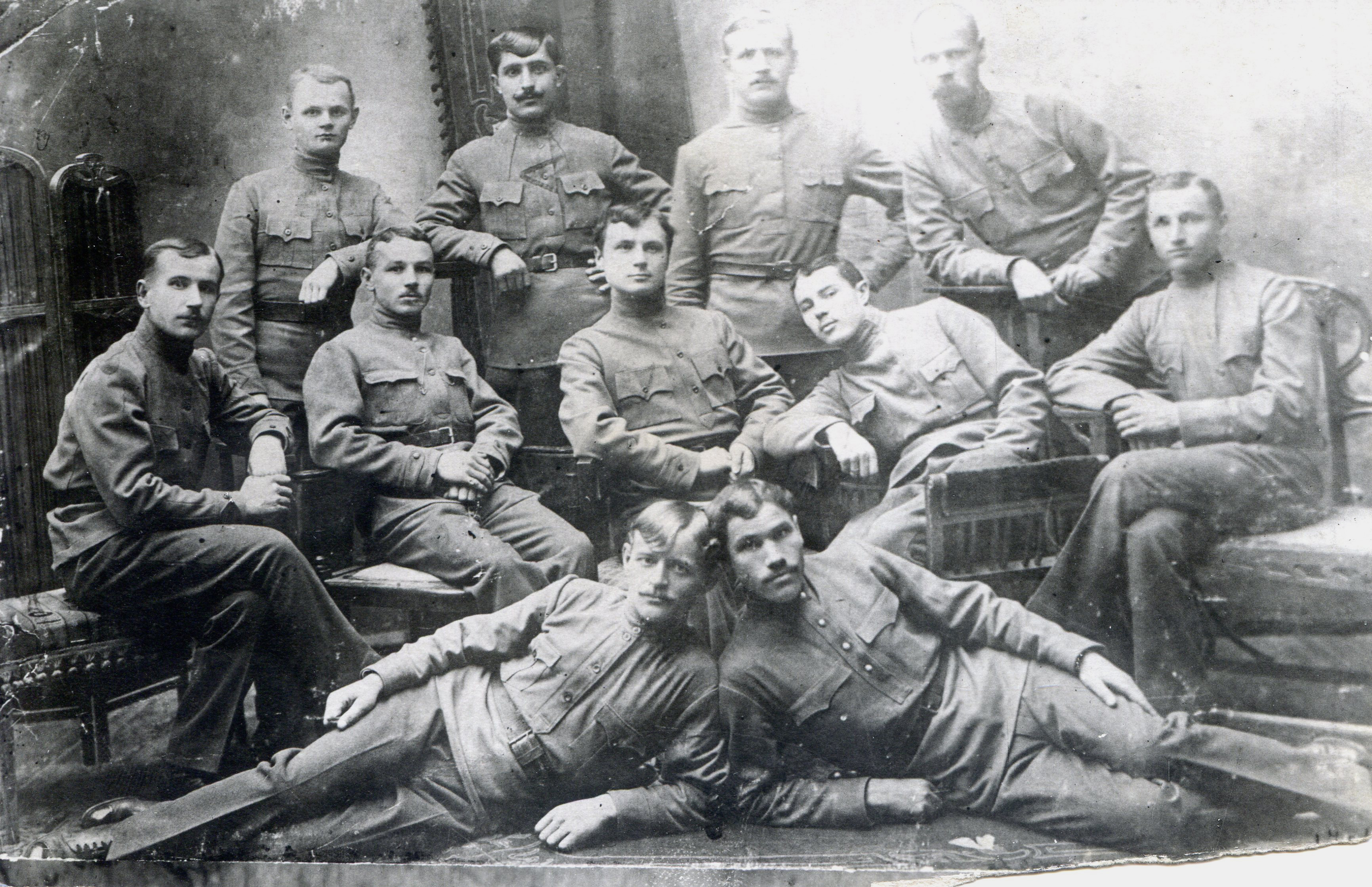
Commanders of the Tashkent Fortress on the eve of the revolt

The Tashkent anti-Soviet revolt of 1919, also known as the Tashkent rebellion, Osipov uprising or January Events, was an armed uprising against the Turkestan Autonomous Soviet Socialist Republic led by the Turkestan Military Organization during the Russian Civil War. It took place between 19 and 21 January 1919. The leader of the uprising was Konstantin Osipov, the Soviet's commissar for military affairs who defected. He took over with him about 2,000 of the Soviet's 5,000 troops. He was allegedly supported by the Allies of World War I under the British colonel Frederick Marshman Bailey, who was in the area. American and French agents were also involved. The main causes of the uprising were food shortages and the Red Terror.

The revolt began on 19 January. By 20 January, the Osipovites were in control of most of the city. Fourteen commissars of the Turkestan ASSR were executed, but the railway station and the Soviet's arsenals were not captured. The Soviet forces regrouped under the fortress commander Ivan Belov and Dmitri Manzhara and there was fighting in the streets throughout the night. By the morning of 21 January, they had chased the rebels from the city. The latter managed to escape with much of the state bank's reserves and attached themselves to the Basmachi movement.

A monument to the Fourteen Turkestan Commissars was erected in Tashkent by the Soviet authorities and an obelisk placed at their gravesite. After the fall of the Soviet Union, the monument was taken down (1996) and the obelisk removed (2000).
