= Turgaysky Uyezd =

Turgaysky Uyezd (Тургайский уезд) was one of the subdivisions of the Turgay Oblast of the Russian Empire. It was situated in the southeastern part of the governorate. Its administrative centre was Turgay (Torgay).

== Demographics ==
At the time of the Russian Empire Census of 1897, Turgaysky Uyezd had a population of 86,948. Of these, 99.1% spoke Kazakh, 0.6% Russian and 0.2% Tatar as their native language.
