= Ruzkin =

Ruzkin روزكين
- Village
- Location within Iran
- Coordinates: 29°14′35″N 57°12′51″E
- Country: Iran
- Province: Kerman
- County: Jiroft
- Bakhsh: Sarduiyeh
- Rural District: Sarduiyeh

Population (2006)
  - Total: 152
- Time zone: UTC+3:30 (IRST)
  - Summer (DST): UTC+4:30 (IRDT)

Ruzkin (Persian: روزكين, also Romanized as Rūzkīn; also known as Rūkīn and Rūskīn) is a village in Sarduiyeh Rural District, Sarduiyeh District, Jiroft County, Kerman Province, Iran. At the 2006 census, its population was 152, in 30 families.
