= Central Asian revolt of 1916 =

Muslim revolt against Russian conscription in World War I

- Part of the Asian and Pacific theater of World War I
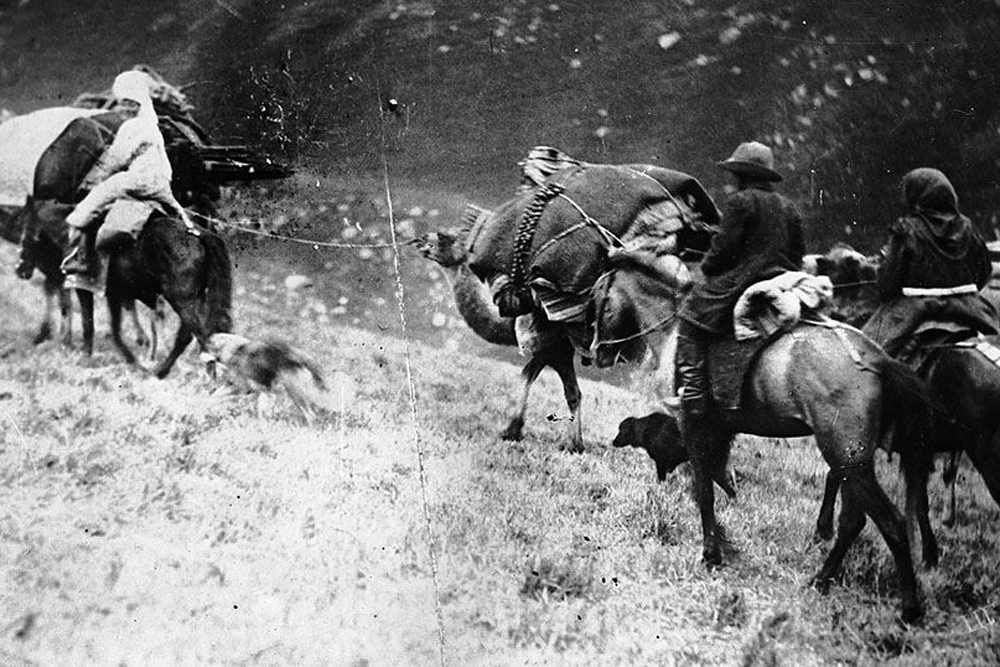
- Kyrgyz refugees fleeing to China following the revolt's defeat
Date	3 July 1916 (16 July 1916, N.S.) – February 1917
Location	Central Asia
Result	Russian victory

Belligerents
Russian Empire; (Russian Empire) Russian Turkestan; Emirate of Bukhara; Kazakh tribes	Turkic tribal confederations; Kazakh rebels; Kyrgyz rebels

Commanders and leaders
(Russian Empire) Aleksey Kuropatkin; (Russian Empire) Nikolai Sukhomlinov; (Russian Empire) Mikhail Folbaum; Sayyid Alim Khan	Kanaat Abukin †; Mokush Shabdanov; Kokumbay Chiny; Baatyrkan Rayymbek; Amankeldı İmanov; Äbdiğapar Janbosynūly; Älıbi Jangeldin; Sami Bek (Note: According to Abdulla Gyun Dogdu, Sami Bek was a Rebel leader of Turkish origin.); (Ottoman Empire) Ibrahim Tulayaf; (Ottoman Empire) Makush; (Ottoman Empire) 5 Ottoman officers

Strength
(Russian Empire) 14,5 battalions, 33 hundreds	Unknown (German Empire) (Austria-Hungary) Small number of escaped POW volunteers

Casualties and losses
97 killed 86 wounded 76 missing	Tens of thousands killed or captured
- ~100,000–500,000 Central Asian civilians (predominantly Kyrgyz, but also Kazakhs, Uzbeks, Turkmen, and Tajiks) dead 2,325 Russian civilians dead 1,384 missing

The Central Asian revolt of 1916, also known as the Semirechye Revolt and as Urkun (Note: Kyrgyz: Үркүн, romanized: Ürkün, IPA: [ʏɾkʰʏ́n]; lit. 'Exodus') in Kyrgyzstan, was an anti-Russian uprising by the indigenous inhabitants of Russian Turkestan sparked by the conscription of Muslims into the Russian military for service on the Eastern Front during World War I. The rampant corruption of the Russian colonial regime and Tsarist colonialism with regard to its economic, political, religious, and national dimensions are all seen as contributing causes.

The revolt led to the exodus of hundreds of thousands of Kyrgyz and Kazakhs into China, while the suppression of the revolt by the Imperial Russian Army led to around 100,000 to 500,000 deaths (mostly Kyrgyz and Kazakhs, but also Tajiks, Turkmen, and Uzbeks) both directly and indirectly. Deaths of Central Asians were either the result of violence by the Russian army, disease, or famine. The Russian state was not able to restore order to parts of the Empire until after the outbreak of the October Revolution, and the subsequent Basmachi revolt (1916–1923) further destabilized the Central Asian region.

The USSR regime's censorship of the history surrounding the Central Asian revolt of 1916 and the Basmachi revolt has led both Central Asian and international researchers to revisit the topic in the 2010s. The revolt is considered a seminal event in the modern histories of several Central Asian peoples. Special importance is given to the event in Kyrgyz historiography because perhaps as many as 40% of the ethnic Kyrgyz population died during or in the aftermath of the revolt.

Alexander Kerensky and some Russian historians were the first to bring international attention to these events.

== Background ==
The Russian conquest of Central Asia during the second half of the 19th century imposed a colonial regime upon the peoples of Central Asia. Central Asia's inhabitants were taxed by Tsarist authorities and made up nearly 10% of the Russian Empire's population but none served in the 435-seat State Duma.

By 1916, Turkestan and the Governor-Generalship of the Steppes had accumulated many social, land and inter-ethnic contradictions caused by the resettlement of Russian and Ukrainian settlers, which began in the second half of the 19th century, after the Emancipation reform of 1861 which abolished serfdom. A wave of resettlement was introduced by a number of lands and legislative reforms.

On June 2, 1886, and March 25, 1891, several acts were adopted which were "Regulations on the management of the Turkestan Krai" and "Regulations on the management of Akmola, Semipalatinsk, Semirechye, Ural and Turgai regions" that allowed most of the lands of these regions to be transferred to the ownership of the Russian Empire. Each family from the local population were allowed to own a plot of land of 15 acres for a perpetual use.

From 1906 to 1912, as a result of Stolypin reforms in Kazakhstan and the rest of Central Asia, up to 500,000 peasant households were transported from central regions of Russia, which divided about 17 tithes of developed lands.

== The revolt ==
=== Institution of conscription ===
Emperor Nicholas II adopted the "requisition of foreigners" at the age of 19 to 43 years inclusive, for rear work in the front-line areas of the First World War. The discontent of people fueled the unfair distribution of land, as well as the calls of Muslim leaders for a holy war against the 'infidel' Russian rule.

On 25 June 1916 (8 July 1916, N.S.), shortly before the start of the rebellion, Nicholas II adopted a draft of conscripting Central Asian men from the age of 19 to 43 into labor battalions for service in support of the ongoing Brusilov Offensive. Some regional Russian officers were bribed to exempt certain people from conscription. The cause of the uprising was also due to the transfer of lands by the Tsarist Government to Russian settlers, Cossacks, and poor settlers. Political and religious extremism played a role too, as well as the fear of being used as human shields during the Russo-German trench warfare.

=== Beginning of the uprising ===
Flag of the Kyrgyz rebels led by Mokush Shabdanov.

Flag of the Kyrgyz rebels led by Kanaat Abukin.

Flag of Amankeldı İmanov's Kazakh associates. Text translation: "Flag of the leader of warriors and batyr Amangeldy".

The first casualties of the revolt were on July 3–4, 1916 (16–17 July 1916, N.S.) in Khujand, present-day Tajikistan, when an outraged mob assaulted Russian officials. The crowd was dispersed after the Russians opened fire. Not all 10 million people living in Turkestan were willing to participate. Such as the Tekeans living in the Transcaspian region, who were willing themselves to be conscripted. On July 7 (July 20, N.S.), the civil unrest spread to Tashkent and Dagbit. On 9 July (22 July NS) civil disorder occurred in Andijan, where protestors clashed with the police before being dispersed with gunfire, leaving 12 natives wounded. A similar incident occurred on 11 July (24 July NS) in Namangan. That same day, In the village of Dalverzan, the volost head had no troops to defend himself and was thus overpowered by the rebels. Also that day, several Russian officials tried to explain in Tashkent what the call was about and how the lists were to be drawn up. A large crowd appeared around the building where this took place, and the protestors demanded that the drawing of lists should be completely halted, and after their pleas were ignored, they tried to storm the building before being dispersed. 4 people were killed and 6 were wounded in the engagement. On 12 July (25 July NS), Tashkent rose in rebellion. By 13 July (26 July NS) the rebels had seized all of Ferghana oblast.

The rebels had several demands, including transparency in how the lists of citizens due for conscription were compiled, to delay the draft until the end of the harvest, and for one man of each family to stay at home.

83 Russian settlers died and 70 were captured following the Jizzakh uprising. The news about the uprising in Jizzakh led to further uprisings in the Sansar river valley and around Zaamin and Bogdan. A force consisting of 13 companies, 6 cannons, 3 sotnias of Cossacks and three-fourths of a company of sappers was dispatched from Tashkent to deal with the uprising in Jizzakh. The force retook the Russian settlement of Zaamin and Jizzakh, causing many civilian casualties.

On July 17, 1916 (July 30, N.S.), martial law was declared over Turkestan Military District. The insurrection began spontaneously, but it was unorganized without a single leadership; nevertheless, the rebellion took a long time to suppress.

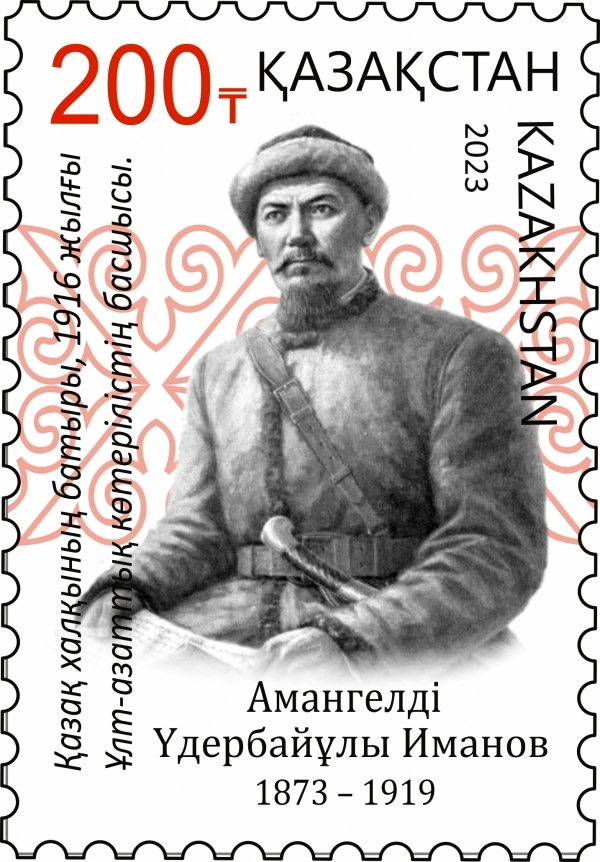
Amankeldı İmanov (on postmark) was the leader of Kazakh revolt on Turgay front

On 31 July (13 August, N.S.), Aleksey Kuropatkin, The Governor-General of Russian Turkestan, conducted a purge of the local hierarchy and convinced Nicholas II of Russia to postpone the conscription until mid-September. However, this effort proved too late to reverse the uprising.

On August 10 (23 August, N.S.), Rebels numbering in the thousands attacked the city of Prebechakenska, while wielding White Banners. It was only defended by a local garrison of Russian Soldiers who were on leave from the front, who swiftly constructed two wooden cannons to try to beat back the attack. The first blew up, while the second was lost in a Kyrgyz attack. Undeterred, the defenders created four new cannons, which still work today.

By August 11 (24 August, N.S.), a cavalry force of the Kyrgyz rebels disrupted a telegraph line between Verniy, Bishkek, Tashkent, and European Russia. A wave of inter-ethnic violence also swept through Semirechye. Dungan detachments destroyed several Russian settlements of Ivanitskoe and Koltsovka in the region of Przhevalsk.

A Kyrgyz attack on the Russian settlers in Sazanovka, near Lake Issyk-Kul was repelled after a local woman shot the Khan who was leading the attack, causing the offensive to disintegrate.

=== Rebel weaponry ===
The rebels, including those under the control of Ibrahim Tulayaf, suffered weapon shortages throughout the course of the rebellion. Weapons used by the rebels included iron-tipped spears and horse-whips.

At one point in the rebellion, Ibrahim had discovered that several munition carts would soon pass through the mountain road that followed the Chu River. Subsequently, he organized an ambush in Bomgorch. After a brief cavalry skirmish and exchange of fire, the rebels managed to capture 7 carts, with 9 crates of guns and 12 ammunition boxes. The rebel troops were delighted to be able to fight the Russian Army with their own tools. A rebel leader was quoted as saying "God has given us guns that Nicholas meant to use against the Kyrgyz – His cruelty will befall his own head.".

=== Massacres by the rebels ===
Other villages full of Russian immigrants and Cossacks were burnt down by the insurgents. Because the majority of men got drafted and were at the front, the settlers could not organize a resistance. Some settlers fled, some fought, while others were helped by friendly Kyrgyz neighbors. At the beginning of the uprising, the majority of the relocated population who were mostly women, old people, and children died. Responses in a telegram to the Minister of War August 16 (29 August, N.S.), Turkestan Governor-General and Commander of the Turkestan Military District Alexei Kuropatkin reported: "In one Przewalski Uyezd 6024 families of Russian settlers suffered from property damage, of which the majority lost all movable property. 3478 people lost and died."

In some places, especially in the Ferghana Valley, the uprising was led by dervish preachers who were calling for a jihad. One of the first people who announced the beginning of a "holy war" against the "infidels" was Kasim-Khoja, an Imam in the main mosque of Zaamin village. He proclaimed Zaaminsky Bek and organized the murder of a local police officer named Sobolev, after which he then appointed his own ministers and announced a military campaign to capture the railway stations of Obruchevo and Ursatievskaya. Along the way, his force killed any Russian person that was encountered.

The Governor-General of the Steppe Region Nikolai Sukhomlinov postponed the draft service until September 15, 1916 (28 September, N.S.); however, it had no effect on stopping the uprising in the province. Even the requests by Alikhan Bukeikhanov and Akhmet Baitursynov who were the leaders of a Kazakh independence movement which later became known as the Alash Party did not calm the population in an attempt to prevent brutal repressions towards unarmed civilians. The leaders repeatedly tried to convince the administration not to hurry with mobilization, conduct preparatory measures, and they also as well demanded freedom of conscience, improving the environment of academic work, organizing the training of Kyrgyz and Kazakh children in their native language by establishing boarding schools for them and allowing local press.

=== Suppression of the revolt ===
As a response, around 30,000 soldiers, including Cossacks, armed with machine guns and artillery were diverted from the Eastern Front of World War I and sent in to crush the rebels, and arrived two weeks later via trains. The town of Novayrsiskya, which had resisted the Rebels for 12 days, was finally relieved thanks to the reinforcements.

Local Cossacks and settler militias played an additional role too. By the end of the summer, the insurrection was put down in the Samarkand, Syrdarya, Fergana, and in the other regions as well, forcing the rebels into the mountains. In the mountains, the rebels suffered from the cold. In September and early October, the revolt was suppressed in Semirechye and the last remnants of resistance were crushed in late January 1917 in the Transcaspian region.

By the end of Summer 1916, The Rebellion had started to wane. Aleksey Kuropatkin issued an order, explaining who was exempt from the draft, what kind of service the Kyrgyz would serve, and that conscripts would receive one ruble per day and free food and lodging. However, with no reliable lines of communication, this message took over a month to reach the rebels.

On December 13, 1916 (December 26, 1916 N.S.), Alexander Kerensky convened in the Russian Parliament to propose the Segregation of the Russian settlers and the local settlers. He was quoted as saying "How can we possibly blame a backward, uneducated and suppressed aboriginal people so dissimilar to us, for having lost patience and committing acts of revolt for which they immediately felt remorse and regret?"

=== Massacre and expulsion of Kyrgyz people ===
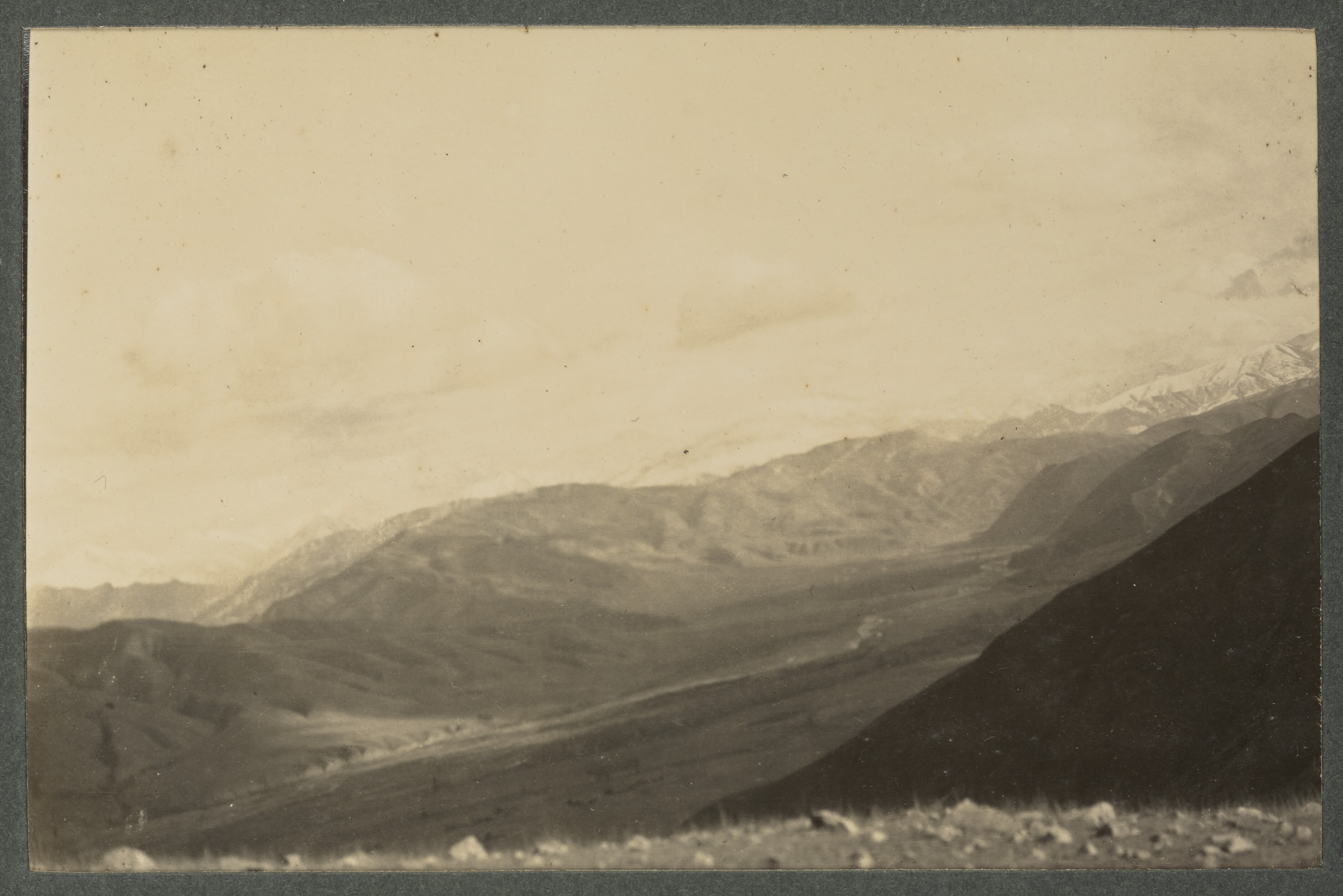
The Tian Shan range seen from the West in 1915

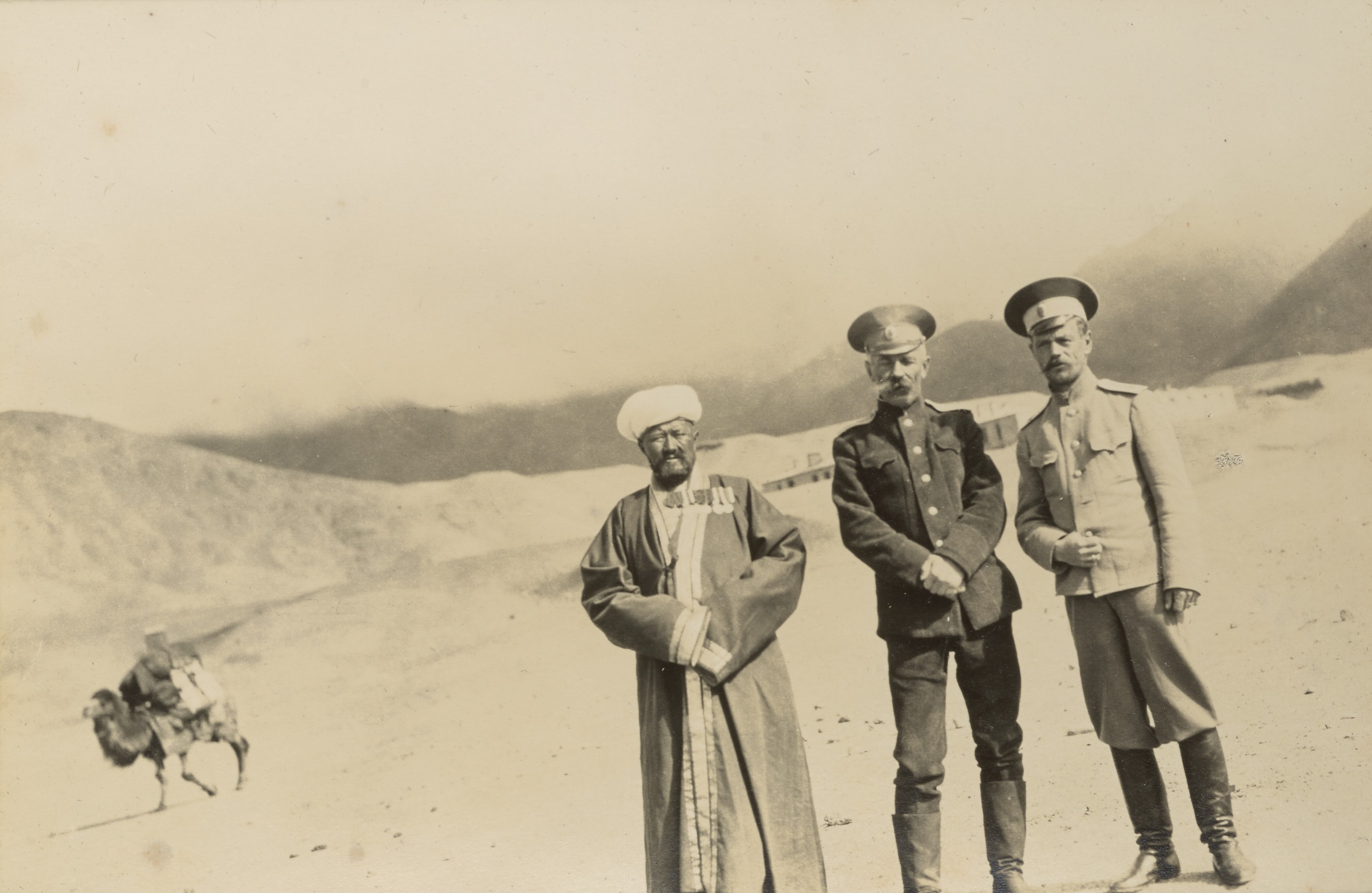
Czarist Russian officials at Pamirski Post near the Chinese border in 1915

By order of the Turkestan governor-general, military courts were established in district cities and imposed death sentences towards all the rebels who took part in the uprising. What ensued was a campaign of collective massacre and expulsion of Kyrgyz civilians and insurgents alike by Tsarist forces. Settlers participated in the killings, as revenge for the abuses they suffered from the insurgents.

In the eastern part of Russian Turkestan, tens of thousands of surviving Kyrgyz and Kazakhs fled toward China. In the Tien-Shan Mountains they died by the thousands in mountain passes over 3,000 meters high. The expulsion of Central Asians by Russian forces had its roots in Tsarist policy of ethnic homogenization.

One account from 1919, three years after the start of the revolt, describes the aftermath of the uprising as follows:

It took me nearly a whole day to drive from Tokmak to the village of sonovka. I kept passing large Russian settlements on the road ... then Kirghiz villages completely ruined and razed literally to the ground – villages where, but three short years previously, there had been busy bazaars and farms surrounded with gardens and fields of luzerne. Now on every side a desert. It seemed incredible that it was possible in so short a time to wipe whole villages off the face of the earth, with their well-developed system of farming. It was only with the most attentive search that i could find the short stumps of their trees and remains of their irrigation canals. The destruction of the aryks or irrigation canals in this district quickly reduced a highly developed farming district into a desert and blotted out all traces of cultivation and settlement. Only in the water meadows and low-lying ground near the stream is any cultivation possible.

=== Deaths ===
The Kyrgyz historian Shayyrkul Batyrbaeva puts the death toll at 40,000, based on population tallies but other contemporary estimates are significantly higher. Special importance is given to the event in Kyrgyz historiography because perhaps has many as 40% of the ethnic Kyrgyz population died during or in the aftermath of the revolt.

In his 1954 book, The Revolt of 1916 in Russian Central Asia, Edward Dennis Sokol used government periodicals and the Krasnyi Arkhiv (The Red Archive) to estimate that approximately 270,000 Central Asians—Kazakhs, Kyrgyz, Tajiks, Turkmen, and Uzbeks—perished at the hands of the Russian army or from diseases, famine. In addition to those killed outright, tens of thousands of men, women, and children died while trying to escape over treacherous mountain passes into China.

3,000 Russian settlers were killed during the first phase of the revolt. Overall, 2,325 Russians were killed in the revolt and 1,384 went missing. Other, much higher figures have also been cited: Arnold J. Toynbee alleges 500,000 Central Asian Turks perished under the Russian Empire, though he admits this is speculative. Rudolph Rummel citing Toynbee states 500,000 perished within the revolt. Kyrgyz sources put the death toll between 100,000 and 270,000; the latter figure amounting to 40% of the entire Kyrgyz population. The Kyrgyz division of Radio Free Europe claimed at least 150,000 were massacred by Tsarist troops.

== Legacy ==
Some survivors have begun to label the events a "massacre" or "genocide." In August 2016, a public commission in Kyrgyzstan concluded that the 1916 mass crackdown constituted "genocide." In response the Russian State Duma chairman, Sergei Naryshkin, denied the events were a genocide, stating: "all nations suffered 100 years ago."

== See also ==
- Basmachi movement
- Dungan Revolt (1862–1877)
- Second Italo-Senussi War
- Indian Rebellion of 1857
- Wanpaoshan Incident
- Western imperialism in Asia
