= Steppe Governorate-General =

1882–1918 governorate of the Russian Empire

Steppe Governorate-General Степное генерал-губернаторство
- Governorate-General of Russian Empire
- 1882–1918
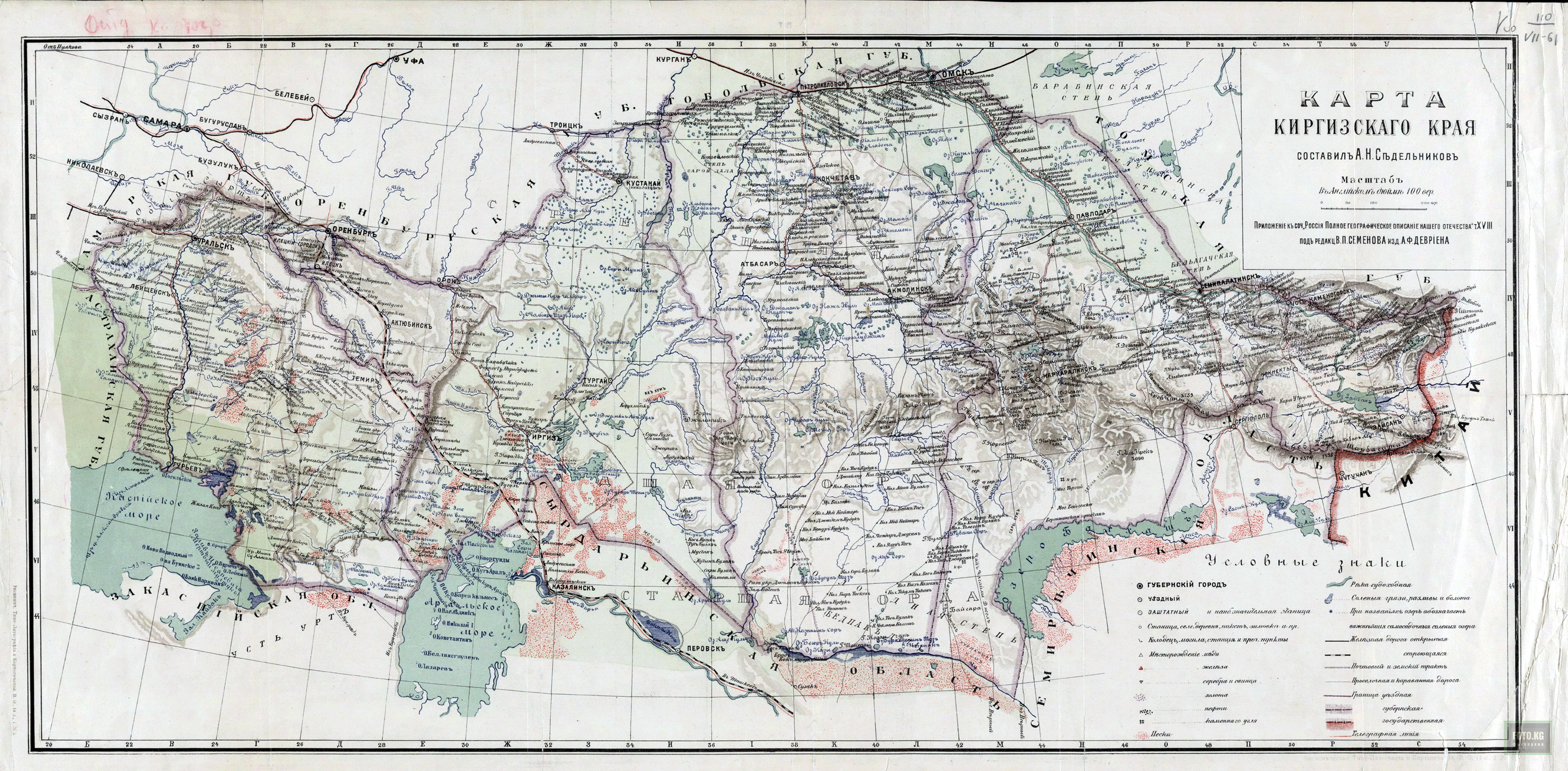
- Capital: Omsk
- History
  - Established: 1882
  - Disestablished: 1918
Preceded by	Succeeded by
West-Siberian Governorate-General	Alash Autonomy; Russian Soviet Federative Socialist Republic
- Today part of: Kazakhstan; Kyrgyzstan; Russia; Uzbekistan

The Steppe Governorate-General (Russian: Степное генерал-губернаторство, romanized: Stepnoye general-gubernatorstvo), also known as the Steppe Krai, was a Governorate-General of the Russian Empire located in the colonized territories of the Kazakh Steppe and Western Siberia, covering modern Kazakhstan, as well as parts of Kyrgyzstan and Russia. It consisted of four or five oblasts: Akmolinsk, Semipalatinsk, Turgay, and Ural oblasts, and from 1882 to 1899 Semirechye Oblast, having the total area of 2,240,000 square kilometres (860,000 mi^{2}) and the total population of 3,454,000 (both including Semirechensk) in 1897. Omsk was the capital.

== History ==
Russia asserted full control over the Kazakh Steppe in the early 19th century, amidst the Russian conquest of Central Asia. As part of its resettlement policy, the Russian government handed over pastures to over 800,000 ethnically Russian settler-colonists; this, along with the blocking of traditional transhumance routes and lands used to sustain Kazakh practices of nomadic pastoralism, resulted in the disruption of Kazakh customary land law and sedentism among Kazakh nomadic communities. In other cases, Kazakhs became labourers in the service of the Russian settler population. Sedentism, as well as the unequal distribution of land favouring Russian settlers, was the dominant issue in local politics during the early 20th century.

A Russophone Kazakh intelligentsia began emerging in the mid-19th century, later growing into an anti-colonial movement that was strengthened by the Russian Revolution of 1905. Beginning with the 1903 arrest of Jakyp Aqbayev, Russian colonial authorities frequently arrested or otherwise targeted Kazakh activists, especially during the administration of Aleksandr Troynitsky over Semipalatinsk Oblast. This repression resulted in the further growth of nationalist and anti-colonialist activism as the movement grew increasingly politicised, later becoming the Alash movement.
