= Alash Autonomy =

1917–1920 Kazakh state in Central Asia

Coordinates: 50°N 70°E

Alash Autonomy: Алаш Автономиясы (Kazakh); Алашская автономия (Russian); آلاچ اوردا Алаш Орда (Kazakh)
- 1917–1920
- Proposed flag (top); Flag mentioned in 1918 (bottom) Seal
- Motto: Оян, Қазақ! Oian, Qazaq! Проснись, казах! Wake up, Kazakh!
- Anthem: «Оян, Қазақ!» "Oian, Qazaq!" "Wake Up, Kazakh!"
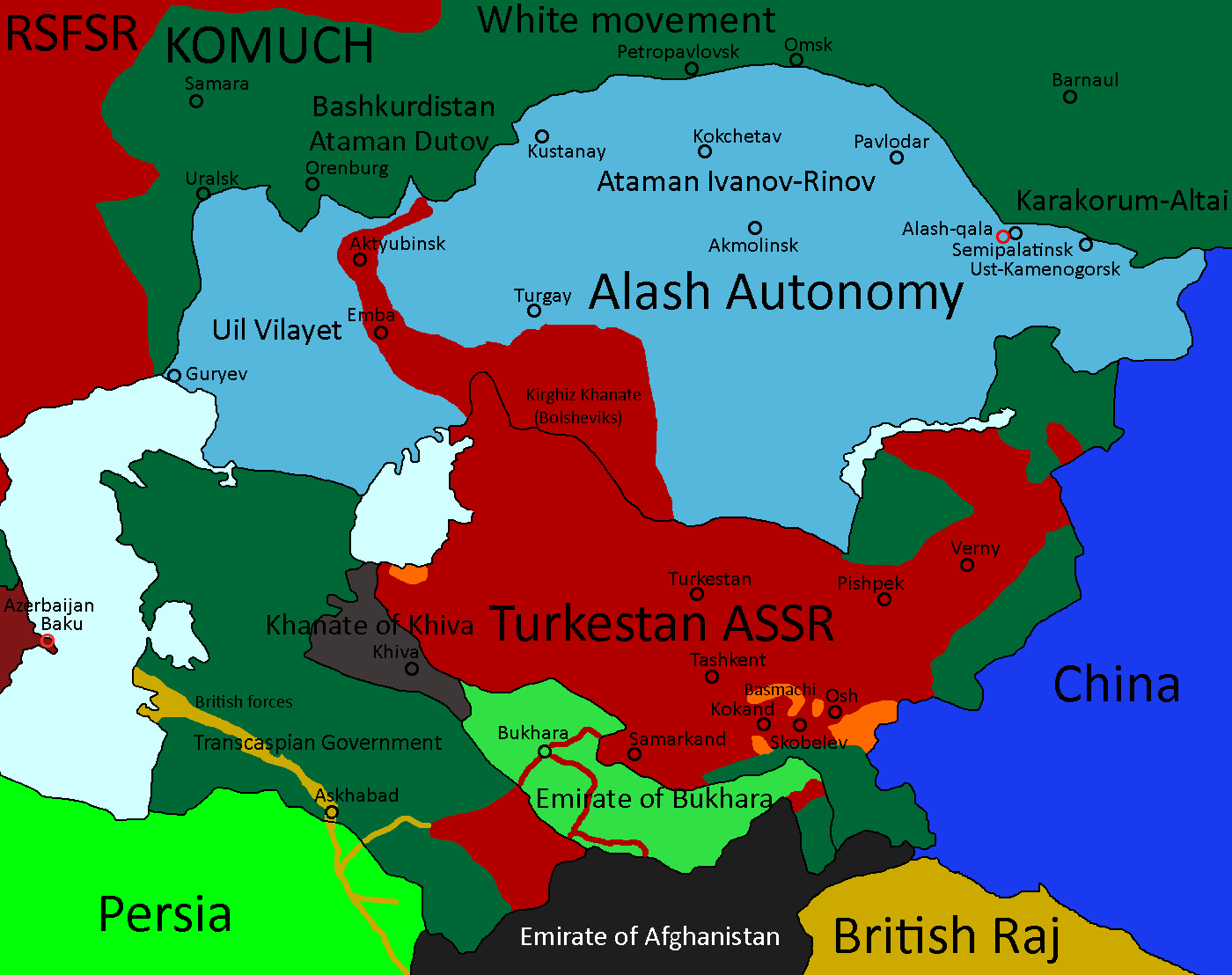
- Alash autonomy in the summer of 1918.
- Status: Unrecognized quasi-state of Russia
- Capital: Alash-Qala
- Common languages: Kazakh
- Religion: Sunni Islam
- Government: Provisional government
- Prime Minister
  - 1917–1920: Alikhan Bukeikhanov
- Historical era: Russian Civil War
  - Established: 13 December 1917
  - Disestablished: 26 August 1920
Preceded by	Succeeded by
Governor-Generalship of the Steppes; Russian Republic	Kirghiz ASSR; Russian SFSR
- Today part of: Kazakhstan; Russia

The Alash Autonomy, (Note: Kazakh: Алаш Автономиясы, romanized: Alaş Avtonomiasy, pronounced [ɑˈɫɑʃ ɐftɐˌnomʲɪjəˈsə]; Russian: Алашская автономия, romanized: Alašskaja avtonomija, IPA: [ɐˈɫaʂkəjə ɐftɐˈnomʲɪjə]) also known as Alash Orda, (Note: /əˈlɑːʃ ɔːrˈdɑː/ ə-LAHSH or-DAH; lit. 'Alash Horde'; Kazakh: Алаш Орда, romanized: Alaş Orda, arabized: الاش وردا, Iske imla: آلاچ اوردا IPA: [ɑˈɫɑʃ worˈdɑ]; Russian: Алаш-Орда, romanized: Alaš-Orda, IPA: [ɐˈɫaʂ ɐrˈda]) was an unrecognized Kazakh proto-state located in Central Asia and was part of the Russian Republic, and then Soviet Russia. The Alash Autonomy was founded in 1917 by Kazakh elites, and disestablished after the Bolsheviks banned the ruling Alash party. The goal of the party was to obtain autonomy within Russia, and to form a national democratic state. The political entity bordered Russian territories to the north and west, the Turkestan Autonomy to the south, and China to the east.

== Ethnonym ==
The use of the word Alash is widespread in Kazakh culture. Most commonly, Alash is the group of three jüzes, territorial and tribal divisions of Kazakhs. It means that the name of autonomy can be used as a synonym to Kazakh. The ruling party wanted autonomy to unite all Turkic people from Central Asia, however the idea failed, as after several negotiations, congresses became a scene to show the unity of the Turks rather than serious talks about pan-Turkism.

== History ==
After almost a century of Russian colonialism and policies of Russification, many Kazakhs began to openly support measures against the Russian state. In the 1870s and 80s, access to education was increasingly assured with the opening of schools and other educational institutions. Many of the future higher-up members of the Alash party were pupils during this period of time. In 1916, after the conscription of Muslims into the military for service in the Eastern Front during World War I, Kazakhs and Kyrgyz people rose up against the Russian government, with uprisings lasting until February 1917.

The state was proclaimed during the Second All-Kazakh Congress, held at Orenburg from 5 to 13 December 1917 OS (18 to 26 December 1917 NS), with a provisional government being established under the oversight of Alikhan Bukeikhanov. However, the nation's purported territory was still under the de facto control of the region's Russian-appointed governor, Vasily Balabanov, until 1919. In 1920, he fled the Russian Red Army for self-imposed exile in China, where he was recognised by the Chinese as Kazakhstan's legitimate ruler.

Following its proclamation in December 1917, Alash leaders established the Alash Orda, a Kazakh government which was aligned with the White Army and fought against the Bolsheviks in the Russian Civil War. In 1919, when the White forces were losing, the Alash Autonomous government began negotiations with the Bolsheviks. By 1920, the Bolsheviks had defeated the White Russian forces in the region and occupied Kazakhstan. On 17 August 1920, the Soviet government established the Kirghiz Autonomous Soviet Socialist Republic, which in 1925 changed its name to Kazakh Autonomous Socialist Soviet Republic, and finally to Kazakh Soviet Socialist Republic in 1936.

== Government ==
Alash Orda (Kazakh: Алаш Орда, "Alash Horde") was the name of the provisional Kazakh government from 13 September 1917 to 1918. This provisional government consisted of twenty-five members: ten positions reserved for non-Kazakhs and fifteen for ethnic Kazakhs. During their rule, the Alash Orda formed a special educational commission and established militia regiments as their armed forces. They issued a number of legislative resolutions.

Alongside the authority of the Alash Orda, independent Bolshevik councils sprang up which opposed the body's rule and aligned themselves with Vladimir Lenin in the brewing Russian Civil War. By 1919, the legitimate government of the Alash Autonomy had been effectively dismantled by Soviet forces, its territory being integrated into the nascent Soviet Union. On 17 August 1920, the Kirghiz Autonomous Soviet Socialist Republic was proclaimed by Lenin and Mikhail Kalinin; this would eventually become the Kazakh Soviet Socialist Republic and would remain the functioning authority in the region until the dissolution of the Soviet Union in the late-1980s.

== Films ==
- 1994 The Word About Alash («Алаш туралы сөз»), documentary by Kazakhtelefilm and film director Kalila Umarov.
- 2009 Alashorda («Алашорда»), documentary by Kazakhfilm and film director Kalila Umarov.
- 2018 Strait time («Тар заман»), series by the Qazaqstan TV channel.

== See also ==
- Mountainous Republic of the Northern Caucasus
- Turkestan Autonomy
- Turkestan Autonomous Soviet Socialist Republic
- Kazakh Autonomous Socialist Soviet Republic
- Üş Jüz
- Alash militia
