= Turgay Oblast (Russian Empire) =

Administrative division of the Russian Empire

Coordinates: 48°N 60°E

Turgay Oblast Тургайская область
- Oblast of Russian Empire
- 1868–1920
- Coat of arms

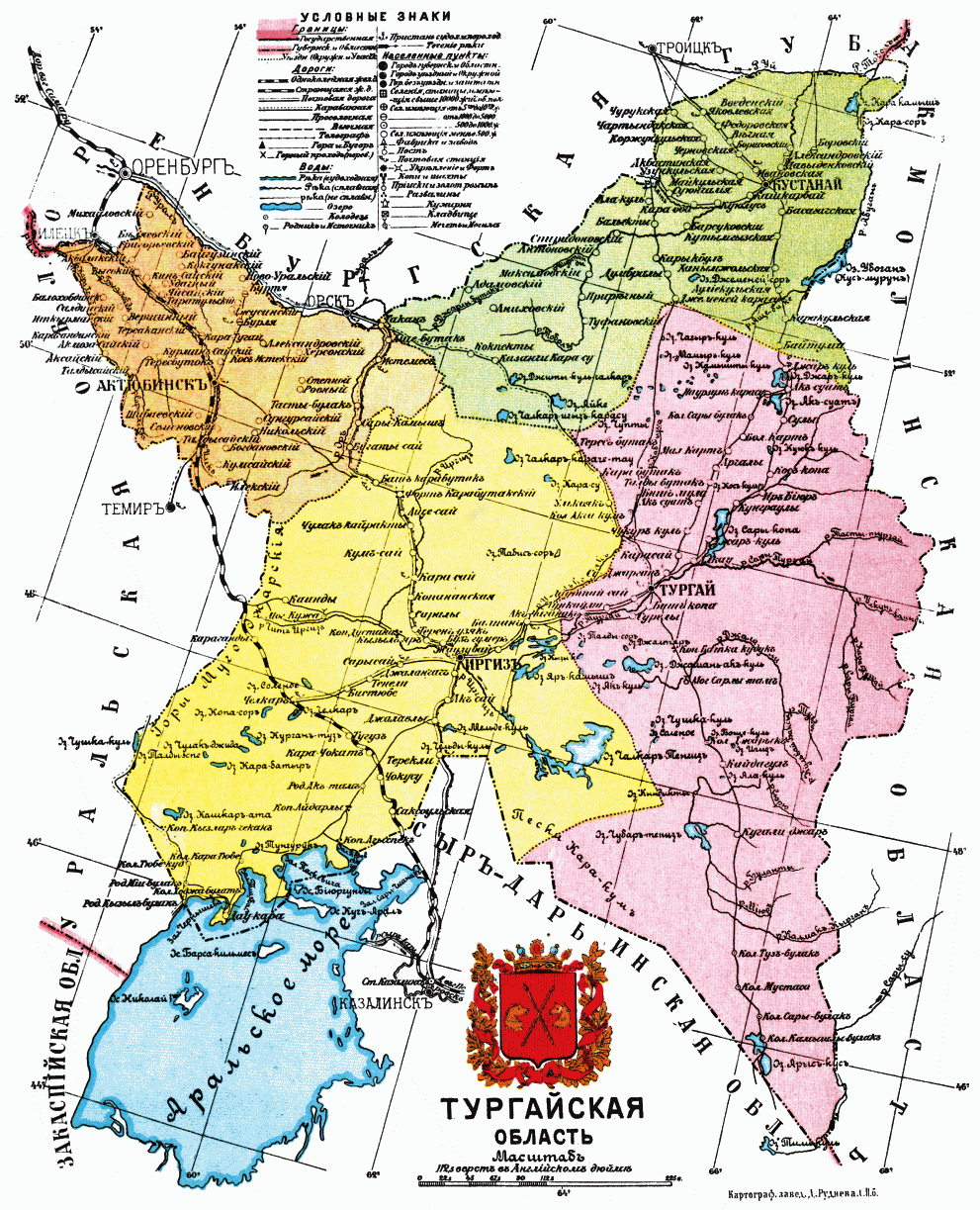
- Map of Turgay Oblast
- Capital: Orenburg
- History
  - Established: 1868
  - Disestablished: 1920
- Political subdivisions: four uyezds
- Today part of: Kazakhstan; Russia

Turgai (also spelled Turgay or Turgaj) was an oblast (province) in Imperial Russia, established on October 21, 1868. It was located in the central part of present-day Kazakhstan.

Its land area was 456,185 square kilometres (176,134 sq mi). The site of administration was located in Orenburg, outside the borders of the oblast, since there was no town within it suitable for accommodation of the administration.

== Governors ==
The chief authority of the Oblast was a military governor. The military governors of Turgay Oblast were:

- 1869-1877 Lev Fyodorovich Balluzek (Louis Heinrich von Balluseck);
- 1877-1878 Alexander Konstantinovich Geynts (Heinz);
- 1878-1883 Alexander Petrovich Konstantinovich;
- 1883-1887 Alexander Petrovich Protsenko;
- 1887-1899 Yakov Feodorovich Barabash;
- 1900-1908 Asinkrit Asinkritovich Lomachevsky;
- 1908-1910 Ivan Mikhaylovich Strakhovsky;
- 1910-1917 Mikhail Mikhaylovich Eversman.

== Demographics ==
As of 1897, 453,416 people populated the oblast. Kazakhs constituted the majority of the population. Significant minorities consisted of Russians. Total Turkic speaking were 415,829 (91,7%).

=== Ethnic groups in 1897 ===
TOTAL	453,416	100%
Kazakhs	410,904	90,6%
Russians	30,438	6,7%

== Administrative division ==
Turgay Oblast consisted of the following uyezds (administrative centres in parentheses):

- Aktyubinsky Uyezd (Aktyubinsk)
- Irgizsky Uyezd (Irgiz)
- Kustanaysky Uyezd (Kustanay)
- Turgaysky Uyezd (Turgay)
