= Flags of the Soviet Republics =

The flag of the Soviet Union served as a starting point for each Soviet Republic's own flag.

The flags of the Soviet Socialist Republics were all defaced versions of the flag of the Soviet Union, which featured a golden hammer and sickle and a gold-bordered red star (the only exception being the Georgian SSR, which used a red hammer and sickle and a fully red star) on a red field.

== History ==
When Byelorussia and Ukraine became the founding members of the United Nations in 1945, all of their flags were red with only small markings in upper left corners and needed distinct flags for each other.

In February 1947, the Presidium of the Supreme Soviet of the USSR issued a resolution calling for the Soviet republics to adopt new flags, which each of its republics were recommended to develop and adopt new national flags. So they expressed the idea of a union state, asked to use the symbols of the State flag of the Soviet Union, such as the gold hammer and sickle and the red star, as well as maintain the predominance of red color on the flag of the Union republics. National, historical and cultural features of each republic was instructed to express the other colors and the order of their location, as well as the location based on the national emblem or coat of arms. After competitions for the best projects from 1949 to 1954 the new flags of the 16 republics were developed and adopted. The authorities in Ukraine and Byelorussia were the first to adopt the flags on 5 July 1950, and 25 December 1951, respectively. All others followed suit between 1952 and 1953 with the last republic, the Russian SFSR, adopted the flag on 9 January 1954. With the exception of Russia, all republics adopted at least one horizontal stripe in a non-red color, whereas the RSFSR chose a simple light-blue vertical stripe instead.

Following the dissolution of the Soviet Union on 26 December 1991, only Kazakhstan, Kyrgyzstan, Tajikistan, Turkmenistan (without hammer and sickle), and Ukraine (with the blue and yellow flag already de facto restored as co-flag) retained their Soviet republic flags as independent states until the new official flags were adopted in 1992. Since 1995 (current version adopted in 2012) Belarus retains its old Soviet-era flag with only minor changes.

Their final versions prior to re-adoption of the non-Soviet national flags were as follows:

Flag	Date adopted	Date relinquished	Description	Present-day flag
Flag of the Russian SFSR	9 January 1954	22 August 1991	A red rectangular sheet with a light-blue stripe at the pole extending all the width which constitutes one eighth length of the flag with the golden hammer and sickle and gold-bordered star on the canton.	Flag of Russia
Flag of the Ukrainian SSR	21 November 1949	24 August 1991	A horizontal bicolor of red over azure (light blue) with the golden hammer and sickle and gold-bordered star on top of the canton.	Flag of Ukraine
Flag of the Byelorussian SSR	25 December 1951	19 September 1991	An unequal horizontal bicolour of red over green in a 2:1 ratio and the golden hammer and sickle with the bordered star on the canton, with a white ornamental pattern on a red vertical stripe at the hoist.	Flag of Belarus
Flag of the Armenian SSR	17 December 1952	24 August 1990	A plain red flag with the blue horizontal stripe and the golden hammer and sickle with a gold-bordered red star in its upper canton.	Flag of Armenia
Flag of the Azerbaijani SSR	7 October 1952	5 February 1991	A plain red flag with a golden hammer and sickle and a gold-bordered red star in its upper canton and a horizontal blue band on the bottom fourth.	Flag of Azerbaijan
Flag of the Georgian SSR	11 April 1951	1 November 1990	A plain red flag with the red hammer and sickle with a red star in a blue sun in canton, blue bar in upper part of flag.	Flag of Georgia
Flag of the Uzbek SSR	29 August 1952	18 November 1991	A plain flag with the colors (from top to bottom) red, blue, and red, with the blue band fimbriated in white, with a golden hammer and sickle and a gold-bordered red star in the upper canton.	Flag of Uzbekistan
Flag of the Turkmen SSR	1 August 1953; Revision: 23 September 1974	19 February 1992	A plain red flag with a golden hammer and sickle and a gold-bordered red star in its upper canton with two blue bars in the middle of the flag.	Flag of Turkmenistan
Flag of the Tajik SSR	20 March 1953	24 November 1992	A plain red flag with white and green stripes in the middle of the flag (pan-Iranian colors), with a golden hammer and sickle and a gold-bordered red star in the upper canton.	Flag of Tajikistan
Flag of the Kirghiz SSR	22 December 1952	3 March 1992	A plain red flag with a golden hammer and sickle and a gold-bordered red star in its upper canton with two navy blue bars and a white stripe in the middle of the flag.	Flag of Kyrgyzstan
Flag of the Kazakh SSR	24 January 1953	4 June 1992	A plain red flag with blue stripe and a golden hammer and sickle and a gold-bordered red star in its upper canton.	Flag of Kazakhstan
Flag of the Karelo-Finnish SSR (Note: The Karelo-Finnish SSR was a short-lived Union Republic formed in 1940 from the Karelian ASSR with territory ceded from Finland in the Winter War. In 1956, it was demoted back to an ASSR within the RSFSR.)	1 September 1953	20 August 1956	A plain red flag with the golden hammer and sickle with a red star with the blue and green stripes on the bottom.	Flag of Karelia (federal subject of Russia)
Flag of the Moldavian SSR	31 January 1952	6 November 1990	A plain red flag with the green horizontal stripe and the golden hammer and sickle with a gold-bordered red star in its upper canton.	Flag of Moldova
Flag of the Lithuanian SSR	15 July 1953	18 November 1988	A plain red flag with the golden hammer and sickle and a gold-bordered red star in its upper canton with the white thin stripe and green thick band on the bottom.	Flag of Lithuania
Flag of the Latvian SSR	17 January 1953	27 February 1990	A plain red flag with a golden hammer and sickle and a gold-bordered red star in its upper canton with the blue and white rippling water at the bottom.	Flag of Latvia
Flag of the Estonian SSR	6 February 1953	8 May 1990	A plain red flag with the golden hammer and sickle and outlined star above a band of blue water waves near the bottom.	Flag of Estonia
Flag of the Tatar SSR	29 November 1991		A flag with a green top half and a red bottom half that are divided by a white line through the center.	Flag of Tatarstan

== Flags of other republics ==
Other Union Republics and autonomous republics existed within the Soviet Union, mostly using flags on a similar pattern, or the flag of their "parent" Union Republic, further defaced. Today, the only former Soviet Union territories that use modified versions of their original Soviet flag are the republic of Transnistria (a state of limited recognition, formerly part of the Moldavian SSR) and Belarus (since 1995).

The official flags of the ASSRs were seldom used, and were generally the flag of the republic to which the ASSR belonged, defaced with the ASSR name in its own language(s) and the official language of the SSR; flags matching this pattern are not displayed in the gallery below:

Flag of the SSR of Abkhazia (1921–1931) (Note: Despite its name, the SSR of Abkhazia was never a Union Republic of the Soviet Union but had a special status as a contractual republic of the Georgian SSR, more similar to the administrative republics of the Soviet Union; see Socialist Soviet Republic of Abkhazia: Status.)

Flag of the Bukharan PSR (1920–1924) (Note: The Bukharan People's Soviet Republic was a short-lived Soviet state that governed the former Emirate of Bukhara during the years immediately following the Russian Revolution. In 1924, its name was changed to the Bukharan SSR. After the redrawing of borders by nationality in Soviet Central Asia, its territory was assigned mostly to the Uzbek SSR and some to the Turkmen SSR.)

Flag of the Khorezm PSR (1920–1924) (Note: The Khorezm People's Soviet Republic was created as the successor to the Khanate of Khiva in 1920, when the khan abdicated in response to popular pressure. In 1923, it was transformed into the Khorezm SSR. A year later, it was divided between the Uzbek and Turkmen SSRs and the Karakalpak AO during the national delimitation in Soviet Central Asia.)

Flag of the Moldavian ASSR (1924–1940) (Note: The Moldavian AO, within the Ukrainian SSR, was upgraded to become the Moldavian ASSR, encompassing modern Transnistria (generally recognised as being within Moldova) and a number of territories that are now part of Ukraine, with the intention of winning over Bessarabians and the first step towards a revolution in Romania. In 1940, as a result of the Molotov–Ribbentrop Pact, Bessarabia and Northern Bukovina were ceded to and occupied by the Soviet Union during World War II; the ASSR and the newly-won territories were upgraded to a Union Republic as the Moldavian SSR.)

Flag of the Tajik ASSR (1924–1929) (Note: The Tajik ASSR was an autonomous republic within the Uzbek SSR, created in 1924 during the redrawing of borders by nationality in Soviet Central Asia. Five years later it was promoted to a full Union Republic as the Tajik SSR.)

Flag of the Transcaucasian SFSR (1922–1936) (Note: In 1922, the Armenian, Azerbaijan and Georgian SSRs were merged to form the Transcaucasian SFSR. In 1936, they were repartitioned back into the original three Union Republics.)

Flag of the Pridnestrovian Moldavian SSR/Transnistria (1990–1991/present) (Note: Current flag. The flag of Transnistria, a state of limited recognition, is near-identical to the flag of the former Moldavian SSR. When Moldova became independent, some places in Transnistria refused to fly the new Moldovan flag and continued to fly the flags of the Soviet Union and of the Moldavian SSR. The SSR flag was officially reintroduced as the flag of Transnistria in 2000. Despite the flag and coat of arms, Transnistria is not a communist state.)

Flag of the Turkestan ASSR (1918–1924) (Note: The Turkestan ASSR (initially, the Turkestan Soviet Republic) was an autonomous republic of the RSFSR located in Soviet Central Asia. Upon dissolution, the Turkestan ASSR was split into the Turkmen SSR, the Uzbek SSR, the Tajik ASSR, the Kara-Kirghiz AO and the Karakalpak AO.)

== Gallery ==
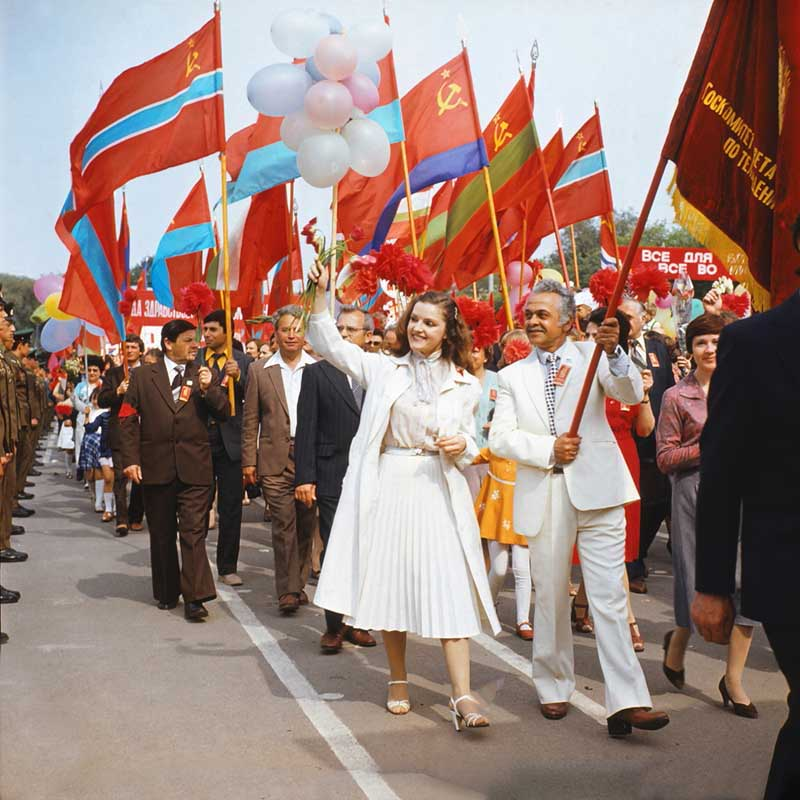
Flags of the Soviet Republics flown during a parade in Kishinev, the capital of the Moldavian SSR.

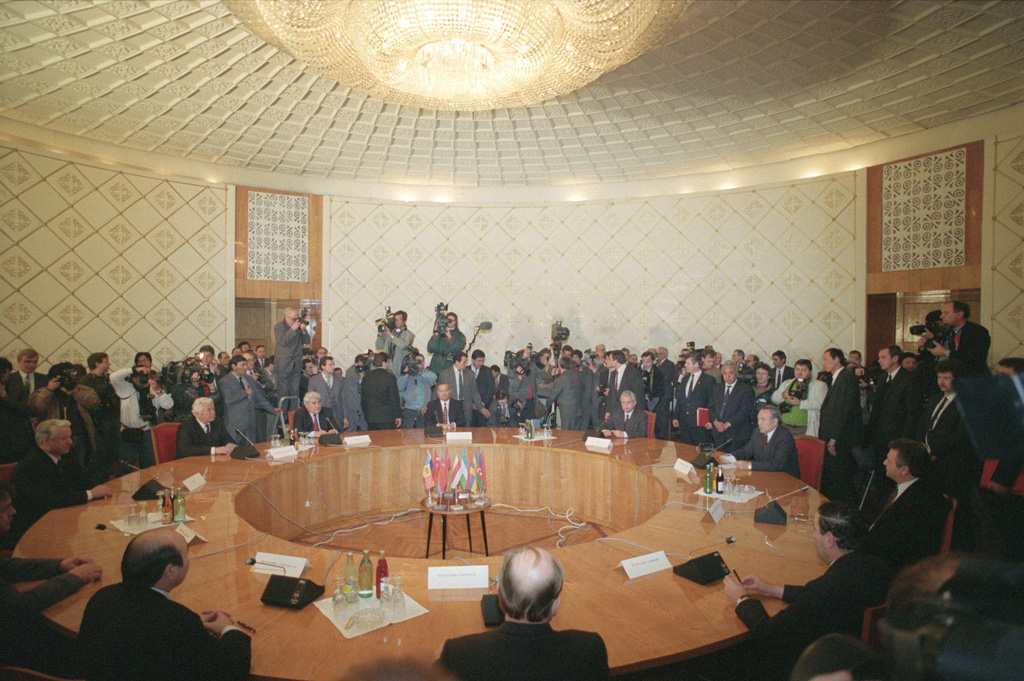
Remaining uses of Soviet republic flags visible during the signing of the Alma-Ata Protocol.
