= National delimitation in the Soviet Union =

Political process in the Soviet republics

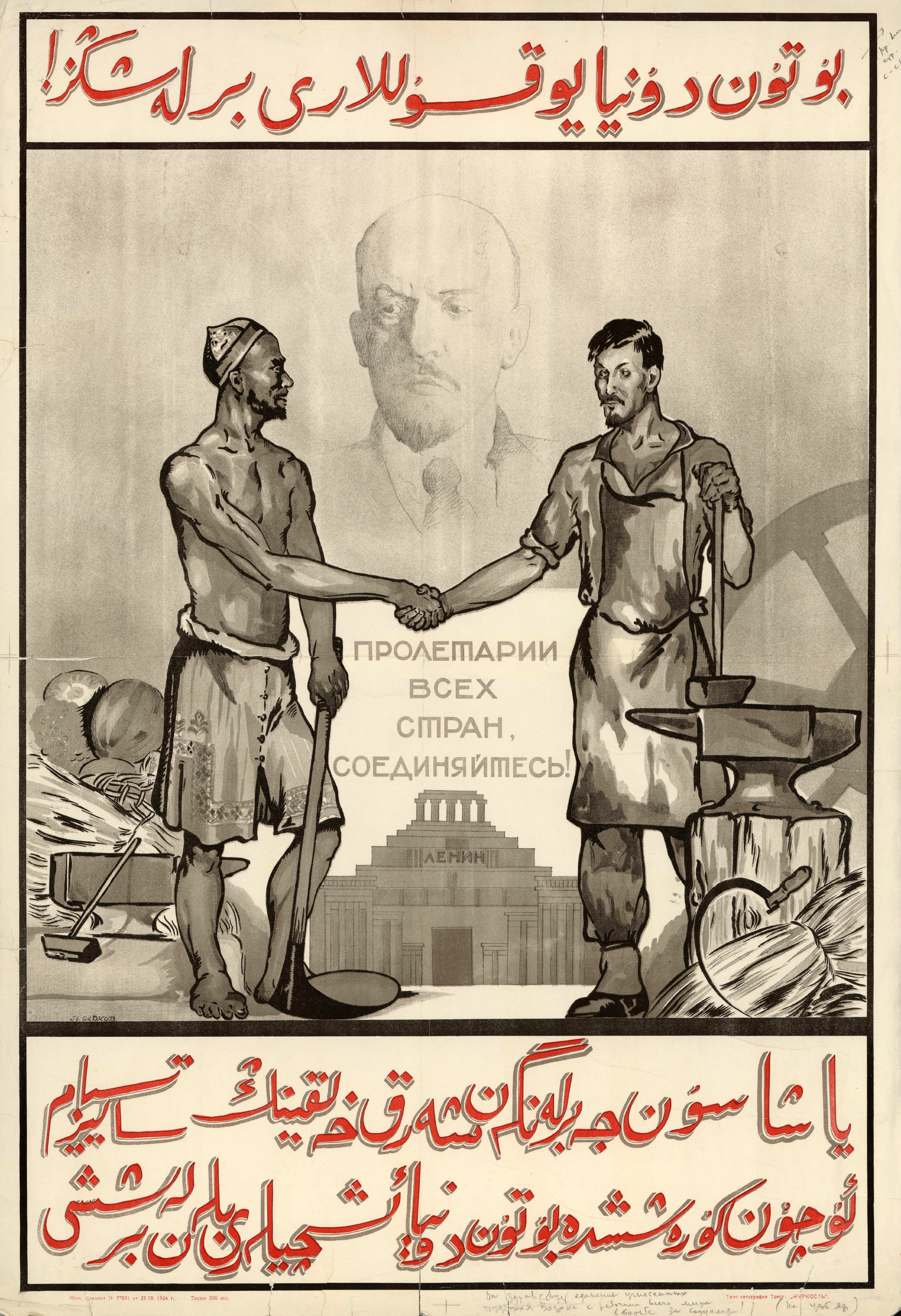
1924 poster in the Uzbek SSR: "Long live the unity of the oppressed labourers of the East with the workers of all the world in the struggle for socialism!"

In the Soviet Union, a broad process of national delimitation was focused on specifying well-defined territorial units—Union Republics (SSRs), Autonomous Soviet Socialist Republics (ASSRs), autonomous oblasts (AOs), raions, and okrugs—for the highly diverse collection of ethnicities and nationalities throughout the country, which spanned an area of 22,402,200 km^{2} (8,649,500 sq mi) across Eurasia.

The Russian-language term for this Soviet state policy was razmezhevanie (from Russian: национально-территориальное размежевание), which is variously translated in English-language literature as "national-territorial delimitation" (NTD), "demarcation", or "partition". National delimitation formed part of a broader process of changes in administrative-territorial division, which also changed the boundaries of territorial units, but was not necessarily linked to ethnic or national considerations.

National delimitation in the Soviet Union was distinct from nation-building (национальное строительство), which typically referred to the policies and actions implemented by the government of a national territorial unit (i.e., a nation state) after delimitation. In most cases, national delimitation was followed by korenizatsiya (i.e., indigenization).

== History ==
=== Pre-communist Russia ===
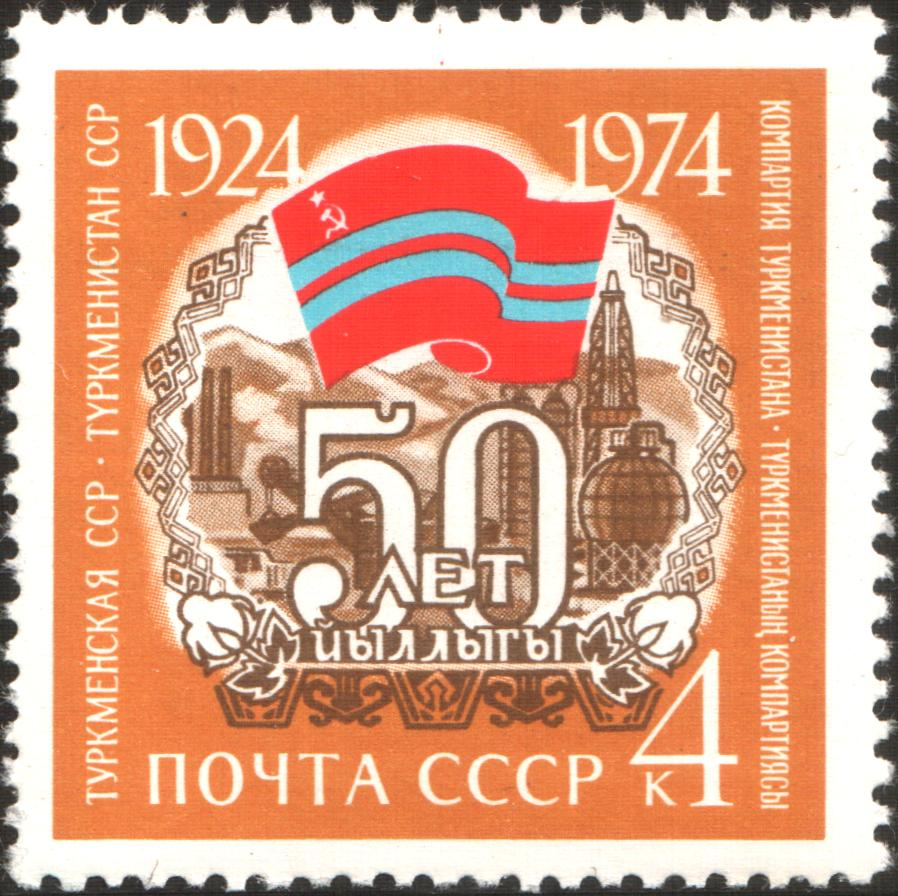
1974 Soviet stamp marking the 50th anniversary of the NTD of the Turkmen SSR.

Pre-1917 Russia was a multi-ethnic empire, not a nation-state. In the 1905 Duma elections, the nationalist parties received only 9% of all votes. Many non-Slavic ethnic groups in the Russian Empire were classified as inorodtsy (иноро́дцы, lit. 'of a different nation'). After the February Revolution, attitudes regarding this topic began to change. An early 1917 publication by the Socialist Revolutionary Party known as Dyelo Naroda (No. 5) called for Russia to be transformed into a federal state along the lines of the United States. Specifically, separate constituent units inside of this federal state would be created for the various regions and ethnic or national groups of Russia, such as Little Russia (Ukraine), Georgia, Siberia, and Turkestan.

=== Bolshevik Russia and early Soviet Union ===
The Bolshevik Russia that subsumed most of the territory of the collapsed Russian Empire in 1917 was not a nation-state, nor were the Bolsheviks committed to turning it into such a state. In the early period following the creation of the Soviet Union between Russia, Belarus, Ukraine, and Transcaucasia in 1922, even voluntary assimilation was actively discouraged, and the promotion of the national self-consciousness of the non-Russian populations was attempted. Each officially recognized minority, however small, was granted its own national territory, wherein it enjoyed a certain degree of autonomy, national schools, and national elites. A written national language (if it had been lacking), national language planning, native-language press, and books written in the native language came with such a national territory, along with cultural institutions like theatres.

=== Stalinist era ===
The attitudes towards many ethnic minorities changed dramatically upon the rise to power of Joseph Stalin (in spite of his own Georgian roots), who implemented a repressive policy featuring abolition of the national institutions, ethnic deportations, national terror, and Russification—mostly towards communities with cross-border ties to foreign nation-states in the 1930s and later also towards communities whom Stalin viewed as having been compromised during the Eastern Front of World War II—although nation-building often continued simultaneously for others.

The Bolshevik-initiated project of building nations out of Russia's and the Soviet Union's numerous ethnic groups was additionally challenged by the process of defining a nation or politically conscious ethnic group. Stalin's 1913 pamphlet Marxism and the National Question, which subsequently became the cornerstone of the Soviet policy towards nationalities, defined a nation as "a historically constituted, stable community of people, formed on the basis of a common language, territory, economic life, and psychological makeup manifested in a common culture". Many of the subject nationalities or communities in the erstwhile Russian Empire did not fully meet Stalin's criteria. Not only did cultural, linguistic, religious, and tribal diversities make the process difficult, but the lack of a political consciousness of ethnicity among the people was a major obstacle. The process relied on the Declaration of the Rights of the Peoples of Russia, which was signed by both Vladimir Lenin and Joseph Stalin, recognized the equality and sovereignty of all the peoples of Russia; their right for free self-determination, up to and including secession and creation of an independent state; freedom of religion; and free development of national minorities and ethnic groups on the territory of Russia.

== Structure of the state ==
=== The Union ===
The Soviet Union was created as a federation of nationalities, which eventually came to encompass 15 major national territories, each of which was organized as a Union-level Republic (Soviet Socialist Republic or SSR). All 15 national republics, created between 1917 and 1940, had constitutionally equal rights and equal standing in the formal structure of state power. The largest of the 15 republics—Russia—was naturally the most diverse (Eastern Europe and North Asia) and existed as a federation within a federation. The Russian SFSR was divided in the early 1920s into some 30 autonomous ethnic territories, many of which exist to this day as ethnic republics within the Russian Federation. There was also a very large number of lower-level ethnic territories, such as national districts and national village soviets. The exact number of ASSR and AO varied over the years as new entities were created while old entities switched from one form to another, transformed into Union-level republics (e.g., Kazakh and Kyrgyz SSR created in 1936, Moldovan SSR created in 1940), or were absorbed into larger territories (e.g., Crimean ASSR absorbed into the RSFSR in 1945 and Volga German ASSR absorbed into RSFSR in 1941).

=== Republics of the Union ===
Republic		Map of the Union Republics between 1956 and 1991
1	Russian SFSR	
2	Ukrainian SSR	
3	Byelorussian SSR	
4	Uzbek SSR	
5	Kazakh SSR	
6	Georgian SSR	
7	Azerbaijan SSR	
8	Lithuanian SSR	
9	Moldavian SSR	
10	Latvian SSR	
11	Kirghiz SSR	
12	Tajik SSR	
13	Armenian SSR	
14	Turkmen SSR	
15	Estonian SSR	

The first population census of the USSR in 1926 listed 176 distinct nationalities. Eliminating excessive detail (e.g., four ethnic groups for Jews (Note: The 1926 census delineated six Jewish ethnic groups: [Ashkenazi] Jews, Bukharan Jews, Georgian Jews, Karaites, Krymchaks, and Mountain Jews) and five ethnic groups for Georgians) and omitting very small ethnic groups, the list was condensed into 69 nationalities. These 69 nationalities lived in 45 nationally delimited territories, including 16 Union-level republics (SSR) for the major nationalities, 23 autonomous regions (18 ASSR and 5 autonomous oblasts) for other nationalities within the Russian SFSR, and 6 autonomous regions within other Union-level republics (one in Uzbek SSR, one in Azerbaijan SSR, one in Tajik SSR, and three in Georgian SSR).

=== Autonomous regions of the Republics ===
Host republic	Host titular nations	Type	Name	Creation date	Titular nations
Russian SFSR	Russians	Autonomous republic	Bashkir ASSR	1919	Bashkirs
Russian SFSR	Russians	Autonomous republic	Buryat ASSR	1923	Buryats
Russian SFSR	Russians	Autonomous republic	Chechen-Ingush ASSR	1936	Chechens and Ingush people
Russian SFSR	Russians	Autonomous republic	Chuvash ASSR	1925	Chuvash people
Russian SFSR	Russians	Autonomous republic	Crimean ASSR	1921–1945	Crimean Tatars
Russian SFSR	Russians	Autonomous republic	Dagestan ASSR	1921	Aghul, Avars, Dargins, Kumyks, Laks, Lezgins, Nogais, Rutuls, Tabasarans, and Tsakhurs
Russian SFSR	Russians	Autonomous republic	Kabardino-Balkar ASSR	1921	Kabarday and Balkars
Russian SFSR	Russians	Autonomous republic	Kalmyk ASSR	1935	Kalmyks
Russian SFSR	Russians	Autonomous republic	Karelian ASSR	1923	Karelians
Russian SFSR	Russians	Autonomous republic	Komi ASSR	1921	Komi peoples
Russian SFSR	Russians	Autonomous republic	Mari ASSR	1920	Mari people
Russian SFSR	Russians	Autonomous republic	Mordovian ASSR	1930	Mordvins
Russian SFSR	Russians	Autonomous republic	North Ossetian ASSR	1924	Ossetians
Russian SFSR	Russians	Autonomous republic	Udmurt ASSR	1920	Udmurts
Russian SFSR	Russians	Autonomous republic	Volga German ASSR	1918–1941	Volga Germans
Russian SFSR	Russians	Autonomous republic	Tatar ASSR	1920	Tatars
Russian SFSR	Russians	Autonomous republic	Turkestan ASSR	1918–1924	Turkic peoples of Central Asia
Russian SFSR	Russians	Autonomous republic	Tuva ASSR	1961	Tuvans
Russian SFSR	Russians	Autonomous republic	Yakut ASSR	1922	Yakuts
Russian SFSR	Russians	Autonomous oblast	Adyghe AO	1922	Adyghe people
Russian SFSR	Russians	Autonomous oblast	Gorno-Altai AO (Oyrot AO until 1948)	1922	Altai people
Russian SFSR	Russians	Autonomous oblast	Jewish AO	1934	Jews
Russian SFSR	Russians	Autonomous oblast	Karachay–Cherkess AO	1922	Karachays and Cherkess
Russian SFSR	Russians	Autonomous oblast	Khakas AO	1930	Khakas people
Georgia	Georgians	Autonomous republic	Abkhaz ASSR	1931 (Abkhazian SSR 1921–1931)	Abkhazians
Georgia	Georgians	Autonomous republic	Adjar ASSR	1921	Adjarians
Georgia	Georgians	Autonomous oblast	South Ossetian AO	1922	Ossetians
Azerbaijan	Azerbaijanis	Autonomous republic	Nakhichevan ASSR	1920	mixed Azerbaijani–Armenian region
Azerbaijan	Azerbaijanis	Autonomous oblast	Nagorno-Karabakh AO	1923	Armenians
Ukraine	Ukrainians	Autonomous republic	Moldavian ASSR	1924–1940	Moldovans
Ukraine	Ukrainians	Autonomous republic	Crimean ASSR	1991	undefined
Uzbekistan	Uzbeks	Autonomous republic	Karakalpak ASSR	1925 (Karakalpak AO until 1932)	Karakalpaks
Tajikistan	Tajiks	Autonomous oblast	Gorno-Badakhshan AO	1929	Pamiris

=== Non-titular nationalities ===
Despite the general policy of granting national territories to all ethnic groups, several nationalities remained without their own territories in the 1920s and the 1930s. In many cases these groups were either widely dispersed, or these minorities were concentrated in areas already designated as the national republic for a different group. For example, Poles and Jews (who were considered a nationality) represented up to a third of the population in some areas of the Ukrainian or Byelorussian SSRs or nearly half of the population in some cities and towns, yet apart from national raions, 24 of which were established in the Ukrainian SSR, no particular territorial entity was created (though a Jewish Autonomous Oblast was established in the Russian Far East in 1934). For the largely Yiddish-speaking Jews in these areas, policies were implemented such as the designation of Yiddish as an official language of Byelorussian SSR and a corresponding national public education system in Yiddish, along with the promotion of Yiddish literature and theatre in these areas as well as in the larger Russian cities. Other minorities included Bulgarians, Greeks, Hungarians, Romani, Uigurs, Koreans, and Gagauz (today the Gagauz live in a compact area known as Gagauzia in the south of Moldova, where they enjoy a measure of autonomy). The Volga Germans lost their national territory with the outbreak of World War II in 1941. The peoples of the North had neither autonomous republics nor autonomous oblasts, but since the 1930s they have been organized in 10 national autonomous okrugs for the Chukotka, Koryak, Nenets, Dolgano-Nenets, Yamalo-Nenets, Khanty-Mansi, Agin-Buryat, Ust-Orda Buryat, Evenk, Komi-Permyak titular nations.

==== National districts ====
Besides national republics, oblasts, and okrugs, several hundred national districts (with populations between 10,000 and 50,000) and several thousand national townships (population 500 to 5,000) were established. In some cases this policy required voluntary or forced resettlement in both directions to create a compact population. The immigration of cross-border ethnic groups and the return of non-Russian émigrés to the Soviet Union during the New Economic Policy, albeit perceived as an easy cover for espionage, were not discouraged and proceeded quite actively, contributing to nation-building.

Soviet fear of foreign influence gained momentum from sporadic ethnic guerilla uprisings along the entire Soviet frontier throughout the 1920s. The Soviet government was particularly concerned about the loyalty of the Finnish, Polish, and German populations. However, in July 1925 the Soviet authorities felt secure enough and in order to project Soviet influence outwards, exploiting cross-border ethnic ties, granted national minorities in the border regions more privileges and national rights than those in the central regions. This policy was implemented especially successfully in the Ukrainian SSR, which at first indeed succeeded in attracting the population of Polish Kresy. However, some Ukrainian communists claimed neighboring regions even from the Russian SFSR.

== Central Asia project ==
=== Rationale ===
Russia had conquered Central Asia in the 19th century by annexing the formerly independent khanates of Kokand and Khiva and the Emirate of Bukhara. After the Communists took power in 1917 and created the Soviet Union, it was decided to divide Central Asia into ethnically based republics in a process known as National Territorial Delimitation (NTD). This was in line with Communist theory that nationalism was a necessary step on the path towards an eventually communist society, and Joseph Stalin's definition of a nation as being "a historically constituted, stable community of people, formed on the basis of a common language, territory, economic life, and psychological make-up manifested in a common culture".

Central Asia's borders are often viewed by critics of the USSR as being an attempt to divide and rule; a way to maintain Soviet hegemony over the region by artificially dividing its inhabitants into separate nations and with borders deliberately drawn so as to leave minorities within each state. Though the Soviets were concerned about the possible threat of pan-Turkic nationalism, as seen in its reaction to the Basmachi movement, closer analysis informed by the primary sources paints a much more nuanced picture than is commonly presented.

The Soviets' intention was to create ethnically homogenous republics; however, many areas were ethnically mixed (especially the Ferghana Valley), and it often proved difficult to assign a "correct" ethnic label to some peoples (e.g. the mixed Tajik-Uzbek Sart, or the various Turkmen/Uzbek tribes along the Amu Darya). In addition, local elites often strongly argued (and in some cases, overstated) their case and the Russians were often forced to adjudicate between them, further hindered by a lack of expert knowledge and the paucity of accurate or up-to-date ethnographic data on the region. Furthermore, the NTD also aimed to create viable entities, with economic, geographical, agricultural and infrastructural matters also to be taken into account and frequently trumping those of ethnicity. The attempt to balance these contradictory aims within an overall nationalist framework proved exceedingly difficult and often impossible, resulting in the drawing of convoluted borders, multiple enclaves and the unavoidable creation of large minorities who ended up living in the "wrong" republic. Additionally, the Soviets never intended for these borders to become international frontiers.

Soviet Central Asia in 1922 before national delimitation

=== NTD and regional demographics ===
NTD of the area along ethnic lines had been proposed as early as 1920. At this time Central Asia consisted of two Autonomous Soviet Socialist Republics (ASSRs) within the Russian SFSR: the Turkestan ASSR, created in April 1918 and covering large parts of what are now southern Kazakhstan, Uzbekistan and Tajikistan, as well as Turkmenistan, and the Kirghiz Autonomous Soviet Socialist Republic (Kirghiz ASSR, Kirgizistan ASSR on the map), which was created on 26 August 1920 in the territory roughly coinciding with the northern part of today's Kazakhstan (at this time Kazakhs were referred to as "Kyrgyz" and what are now the Kyrgyz were deemed a sub-group of the Kazakhs and referred to as Kara-Kyrgyz i.e. "black Kyrgyz"). There were also the two separate successor republics of the Emirate of Bukhara and the Khanate of Khiva, which were transformed into the Bukhara and Khorezm People's Soviet Republics following the takeover by the Red Army in 1920.

On 25 February 1924 the Politburo and Central Committee of the Soviet Union announced that it would proceed with NTD in Central Asia. The process was to be overseen by a Special Committee of the Central Asian Bureau, with three sub-committees for each of what were deemed to be the main nationalities of the region (Kazakhs, Turkmen and Uzbeks), with work then exceedingly rapidly. There were initial plans to possibly keep the Khorezm and Bukhara PSRs, but it was decided in April 1924 to partition them, over the often vocal opposition of their local Communist Parties. The Khorezm CP in particular were reluctant to destroy their PSR and had to be strong-armed into voting for their own dissolution in July of that year.

The Turkestan ASSR was officially partitioned into two Soviet Socialist Republics (SSR), the Turkmen SSR and the Uzbek SSR. The Turkmen SSR roughly matched the borders of today's Turkmenistan and it was created as a home for the Turkmens of Soviet Central Asia. The Bukhara and Khorezm People's Soviet Republics were largely absorbed into the Uzbek SSR, which also included other territories inhabited by Uzbeks as well as those inhabited by ethnic Tajiks. At the same time, the Tajik ASSR was created within the Uzbek SSR for the Tajik ethnic population and, in May 1929, it was separated from Uzbek SSR and upgraded to the status of a full Soviet Socialist Republic (the Tajik SSR). The Kirghiz SSR (today's Kyrgyzstan) was created only in 1936; between 1929 and 1936 it existed as the Kara-Kirghiz Autonomous Oblast (province) within the Russian SFSR. The Kazakh SSR was also created at that time (5 December 1936), thus completing the process of national delimitation of Soviet Central Asia into five Soviet Socialist Republics that in 1991 would become five independent states.

Particularly bitter debates accompanied the partition of the Uzbek and Tajik SSRs in 1929, focusing especially on the status of the cities of Bukhara, Samarkand, and the Surxondaryo Region, all of which had sizeable, if not dominant, Tajik populations. The final decision negotiated by the Uzbek and Tajik parties, not without strong involvement of the Communist Party, left these three largely Tajik-populated territories within the Turkic-populated Uzbek SSR. The Tajik SSR was created on 5 December 1929 as the home for most of the ethnic Tajiks in Soviet Central Asia within the boundaries of present-day Tajikistan.

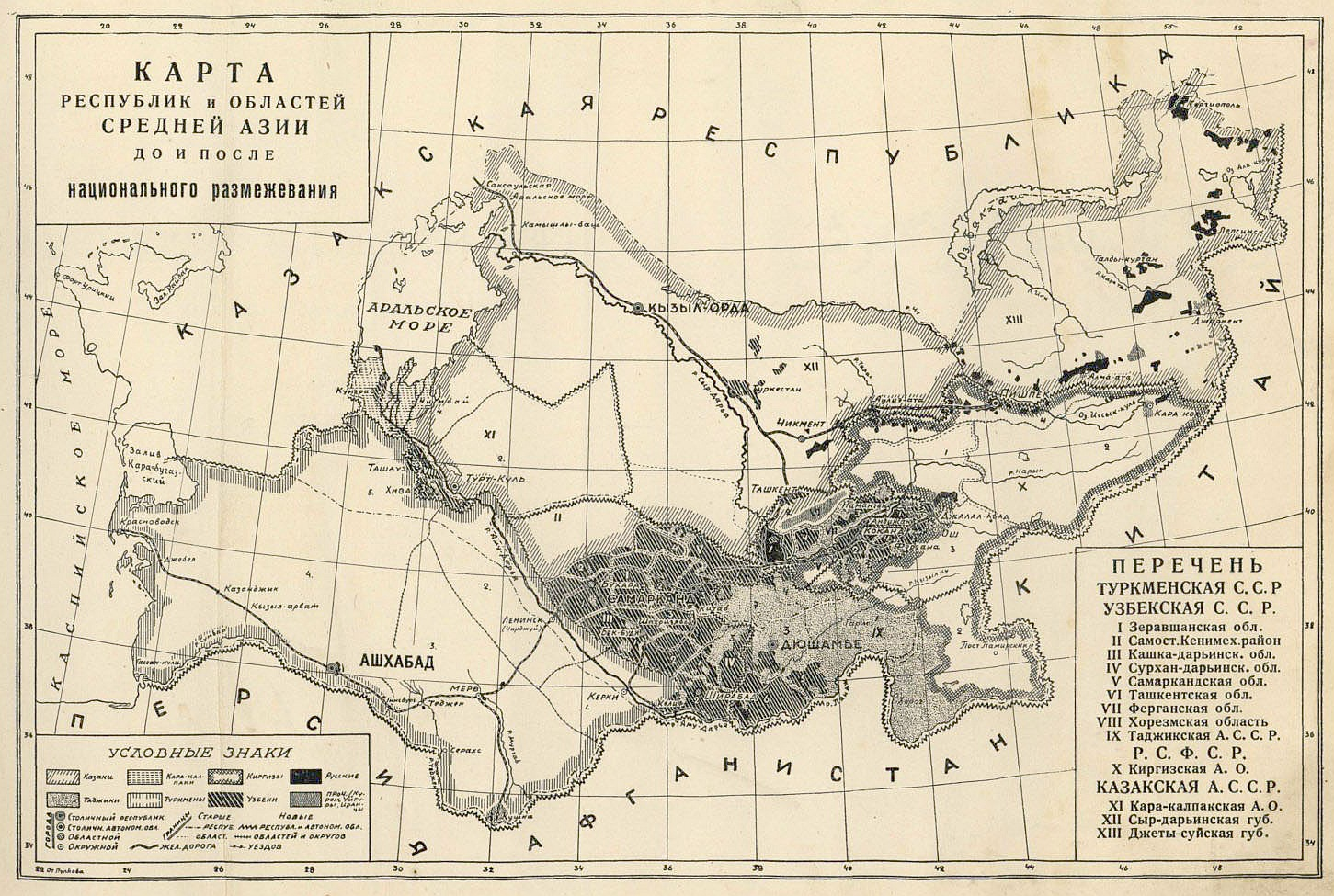
National delimitation in Central Asia 1924-1925

== Post-NTD nation-building ==
In the 1920s and the 1930s, the policy of national delimitation, which assigned national territories to ethnic groups and nationalities, was followed by nation-building, attempting to create a full range of national institutions within each national territory. Each officially recognized ethnic minority, however small, was granted its own national territory where it enjoyed a certain degree of autonomy, in addition to national elites. A written national language was developed (if it had been lacking), national language planning was implemented, native teachers were trained, and national schools were established. This was always accompanied by native-language press and books written in the native language, along with other facets of cultural life. National elites were encouraged to develop and take over the leading administrative and Party positions, sometimes in proportions exceeding the proportion of the native population.

With the grain requisition crises, famines, troubled economic conditions, international destabilization and the reversal of the immigration flow in the early 1930s, the Soviet Union became increasingly worried about the possible disloyalty of diaspora ethnic groups with cross-border ties (especially Finns, Germans and Poles), residing along its western borders. This eventually led to the start of Stalin's repressive policy towards them.

=== Introduction of the Soviet passport system ===
Following the introduction of the Soviet passport system in 1932, each adult citizen's ethnicity (Russian: национальность) was necessarily recorded in their passport. Where parents' nationalities differed, a citizen was able to choose which nationality to register in their passport. This practice did not exist in the Russian Empire and has been abolished in the Russian Federation, although it remains law in some former-Soviet republics, including Kazakhstan and Uzbekistan.

The Bolsheviks' plan was to identify the total sum of all national, cultural, linguistic, and territorial diversities under their rule and establish scientific criteria to identify which groups of people were entitled to the description of 'nation'. This task relied on the existing work of tsarist-era ethnographers and statisticians, as well as new research conducted under Soviet auspices. Because most people did not know what is meant by a nation, some of them simply gave names when asked about ethnic group. Many groups were thought to be biologically similar, but culturally distinct. In Central Asia, many identified their "nation" as "Muslim." In other cases, geography made the difference, or even whether one lived in a town versus the countryside. Principally, however, dialects or languages formed the basis for distinguishing between various nations. The results were often contradictory and confusing. More than 150 nations were counted in Central Asia alone. Some were quickly subordinated to others, with communities which had hitherto been counted as "nations" now deemed to be simply tribes. As a result, the number of nations shrunk over the decades.

== Dissolution and post-Soviet era ==
After the dissolution of the Soviet Union in 1991, fifteen newly sovereign states adopted their own policies and laws with regard to national minorities. A number of conflicts erupted, some of them fed in part by national or ethnic tensions.

In the Russian Federation, some autonomous regions became new ethnic republics.

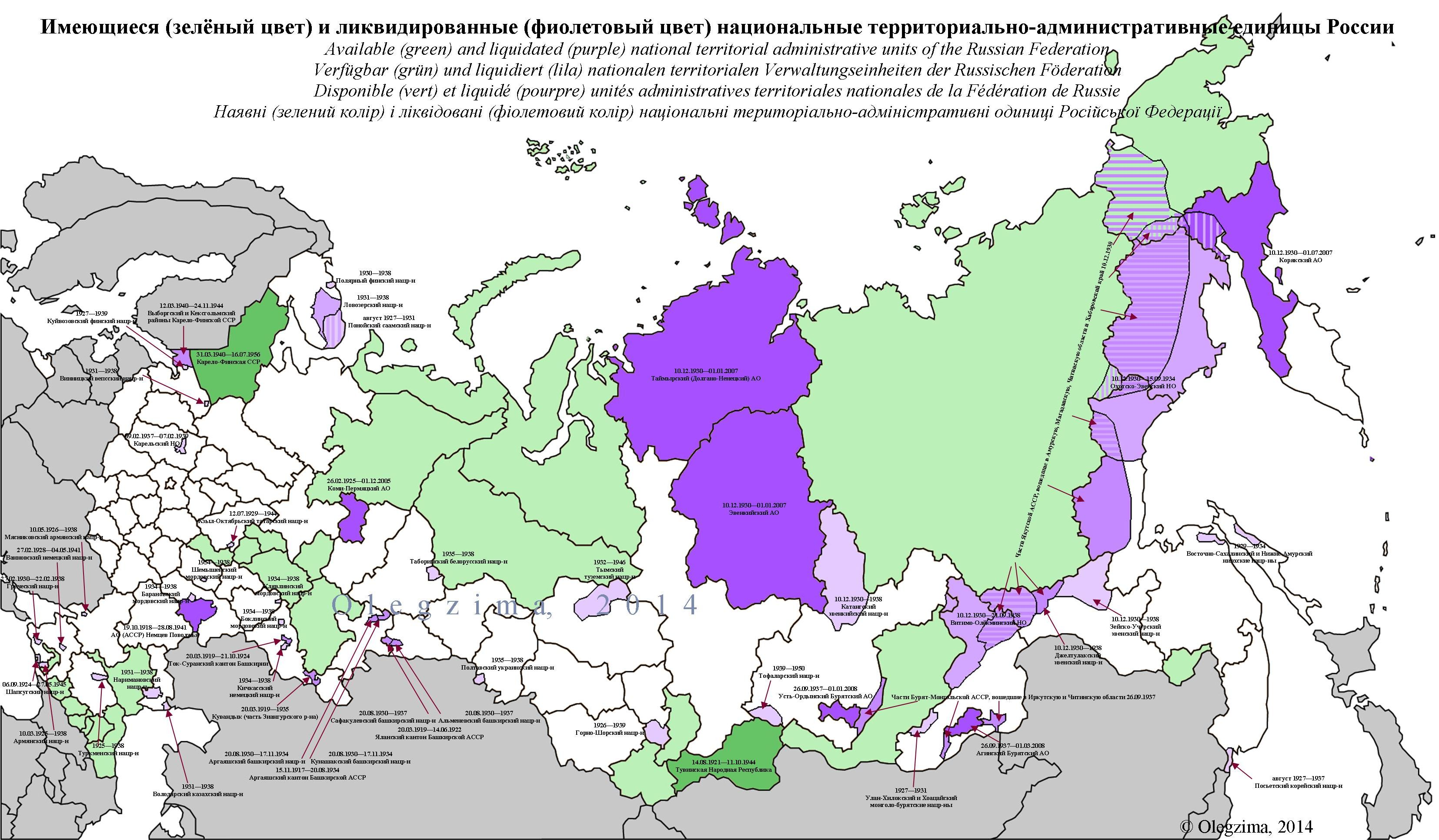
National territorial units of the Russian Federation that succeeded the Russian SFSR in 1991

Map showing the ethnic republics of the Russian Federation (2008) that succeeded the national territories of Russian SFSR (pre-1990)

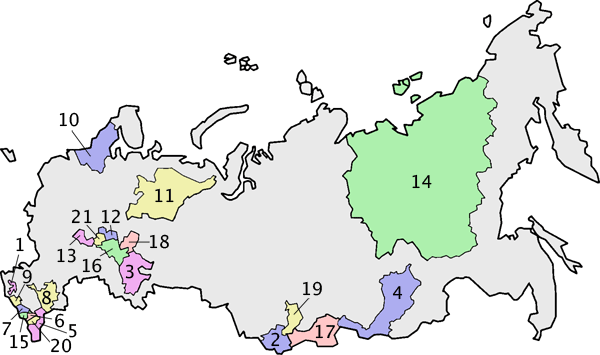
1. Adygea
2. Altai
3. Bashkortostan
4. Buryatia
5. Dagestan
6. Ingushetia
7. Kabardino-Balkaria

8. Kalmykia
9. Karachay-Cherkessia
10. Karelia
11. Komi
12. Mari El
13. Mordovia
14. Sakha (Yakutia)

15. North Ossetia-Alania
16. Tatarstan
17. Tuva
18. Udmurtia
19. Khakassia
20. Chechnya
21. Chuvashia

== See also ==
- Soviet people
- Soviet Central Asia
