= List of Soviet flags =

- Flags of the Soviet Union
- Flags of the Soviet Republics
