= Flag of the USSR (disambiguation) =

Flag of the USSR may refer to:

- Flag of the Soviet Union
- Flags of the Soviet Republics
- List of Russian flags, including historical Soviet flags
- Flag of the Ukrainian Soviet Socialist Republic
