= Soviet Central Asia =

Section of Central Asia formerly controlled by the Soviet Union

- Area: 4,003,451 km^{2} (1,545,741 sq mi)
- Population: ▲49,374,612 (1989 census)
- Demonym: Central Asian, Soviet
- Countries: Soviet Union 5 Republics: Kazakhstan; Kirghizia; Tajikistan; Turkmenia; Uzbekistan
- Languages: Karakalpak, Kazakh, Kyrgyz, Russian, Tajik, Turkmen, Uzbek, and Others
- Time zones: 2 time zones: UTC+05:00: Standard: Kazakhstan (5 regions), Tajikistan, Turkmenistan, Uzbekistan; UTC+06:00: Standard: Kazakhstan (4 cities, 9 regions), Kyrgyzstan
- Internet TLD: .su, .kg, .kz, .tj, .tm, .uz
- Calling codes: Zone 9 except Kazakhstan (Zone 7)
- Largest cities: List (Note: With population over 500,000 people): (Kazakh Soviet Socialist Republic) Alma-Ata; (Turkmen Soviet Socialist Republic) Ashkhabad; (Kirghiz Soviet Socialist Republic) Frunze; (Tajik Soviet Socialist Republic) Dushanbe; (Kazakh Soviet Socialist Republic) Karaganda; (Uzbek Soviet Socialist Republic) Namangan; (Uzbek Soviet Socialist Republic) Samarkand; (Kazakh Soviet Socialist Republic) Shymkent; (Uzbek Soviet Socialist Republic) Tashkent; (Kazakh Soviet Socialist Republic) Tselinograd
- UN M49 codes: 143 – Central Asia; 142 – Asia; 001 – World

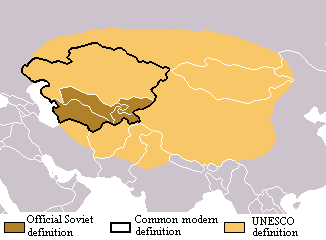
Map of Central Asia showing three sets of possible Eurasian boundaries for the subregion

Soviet Central Asia (Russian: Советская Средняя Азия, romanized: Sovetskaya Srednyaya Aziya) was the part of Central Asia administered by the Russian SFSR and then the Soviet Union between 1918 and 1991, when the Central Asian Soviet republics declared independence. It is nearly synonymous with Russian Turkestan in the Russian Empire. Soviet Central Asia went through many territorial divisions before the current borders were created in the 1920s and 1930s.

== Administrative divisions ==
=== Former divisions ===
==== Turkestan Autonomous Soviet Socialist Republic ====
Map of Soviet Central Asia in 1922 with the Turkestan ASSR and the Kyrgyz ASSR

By the end of the 19th century, Russian tsars effectively ruled over most of the territory that later would constitute Soviet Central Asia. Russia annexed Lake Issyk Kul in north east Kyrgyzstan from China in the early 1860s, lands of Turkmens, Khanate of Khiva, Emirate of Bukhara in the second half of 1800s.

Emerging from the Russian Empire following the Russian Revolution of 1917 and the Russian Civil War of 1918–1921, the USSR was a union of several Soviet republics, but the synecdoche Russia – after its largest and dominant constituent state – continued to be commonly used throughout the state's existence. Turkestan Autonomous Soviet Socialist Republic (initially Turkestan Socialist Federative Republic) (30 April 1918 – 27 October 1924) was created from the Turkestan Krai of Imperial Russia. Its capital was Tashkent, population about 500,000.

British and Persian forces briefly tried to reach Baku in Azerbaijan and the Turkmen port of Krasnovodsk. Bukhara, Khiva, Samarkand, Kokand, Dushanbe and the former Trans-Caspian Province would see various anti-Bolshevik risings over the next few years.

In 1924, it was split into Karakalpak Autonomous Oblast (now Karakalpakstan), Kara-Kirghiz Autonomous Oblast (now Kyrgyzstan), Tajik ASSR (now Tajikistan), Turkmen SSR (now Turkmenistan), and Uzbek SSR (now Uzbekistan).

==== Bukharan People's Soviet Republic ====
Flag of the Bukharan PSR

In March 1918, activists of the Young Bukharian Movement informed the Bolsheviks that the Bukharans were ready for the revolution and that the people were awaiting liberation. The Red Army marched to the gates of Bukhara and demanded that the emir surrender the city to the Young Bukharans. As Russian sources report, the emir responded by murdering the Bolshevik delegation, along with several hundred Russian inhabitants of Bukhara and the surrounding territories. The majority of Bukharans did not support an invasion and the ill-equipped and ill-disciplined Bolshevik army fled back to the Soviet stronghold at Tashkent.

However, the emir had won only a temporary respite. As the civil war in Russia wound down, Moscow sent reinforcements to Central Asia. On 2 September 1920, an army of well-disciplined and well equipped Red Army troops under the command of Bolshevik general Mikhail Frunze attacked the city. After four days of fighting, the emir's citadel (Arc) was destroyed, the Red flag was raised from the top of Kalyan Minaret, and the Emir Alim Khan was forced to flee to his base at Dushanbe in Eastern Bukharan, and finally to Kabul, Afghanistan.

A nearby anti-Bolshevik stronghold in the Tadjik/Moslem village of Khangir (qingir) declared its independence shortly afterwards, but soon surrendered after a 14-day siege by Russian and Bokhkori Bolsheviks. It was then quickly re-integrated back into Communist Bokhorah.

The Bukharan People's Republic was proclaimed on 8 October 1920 under Faizullah Khojaev. The overthrow of the Emir was the impetus for the Basmachi Revolt, an anti-Russian rebellion. In 1922, most of the territory of the republic was controlled by Basmachi, surrounding the city of Bukhara. Joseph Stalin would later purge and exile many of the local Bukhori people as well as most of the local Jewish community from the former Bukharan People's Soviet Republic.

Prior to the establishment of the state of Israel, the Bukharian Jews were one of the most isolated Jewish communities in the world.

==== Khorezm People's Soviet Republic and SSR ====
Flag of the Khorezm PSR

The Khorezm People's Soviet Republic was created as the successor to the Khanate of Khiva in February 1920 and officially declared on 26 April 1920. On 20 October 1923, it was transformed into the Khorezm Socialist Soviet Republic. The Khorezm SSR only survived until 17 February 1925, when it was divided between Karakalpak Autonomous Oblast, the Turkmen SSR, and the Uzbek SSR as part of the reorganization of Central Asia by Moscow according to nationalities.

==== Kara-Kirghiz Autonomous Oblast ====
The Kara-Kyrgyz Autonomous Oblast (Кара-Киргизская АО) was created on 14 October 1924 within the Russian SFSR from the predominantly Kazakh and Kyrgyz parts of the Turkestan Autonomous Soviet Socialist Republic. On 15 May 1925 it was renamed into the Kyrgyz Autonomous Oblast. On 1 February 1926 it was reorganized into the Kyrgyz ASSR. On 5 December 1936 it became the Kyrgyz SSR, one of the constituent republics of the Soviet Union.

==== Karakalpak Autonomous Oblast ====
The Karakalpak Autonomous Oblast was created on 19 February 1925 by separating lands of the ethnic Karakalpaks from the Turkestan Autonomous Soviet Socialist Republic and Khorezm People's Soviet Republic.

Initially located within the Kazakh Autonomous Socialist Soviet Republic, the Karakalpak A.O. was transferred to the RSFSR from 20 July 1930 to 20 March 1932, at which time it was elevated to the Karakalpak Autonomous Soviet Socialist Republic. The Karakalpak ASSR was joined to the Uzbek SSR on 5 December 1936.

==== Kazakh Autonomous Soviet Socialist Republic ====
The Kazakh ASSR was an autonomous republic of the Soviet Union. It became the Kazakh SSR on 5 December 1936.

Its original name was the Kirgiz Autonomous Soviet Socialist Republic. This ASSR was established on 26 August 1920, and was a part of the Russian Soviet Federative Socialist Republic (RSFSR)

In 1925 it was renamed the Kazakh Autonomous Soviet Socialist Republic. In 1929 the city of Almaty (Alma-Ata) was designated as the capital of the ASSR.

=== Soviet Republics ===
==== Kazakhstan ====
Flag and coat of arms of Kazakhstan

The Kazakh Soviet Socialist Republic, also known as Kazakhstan, was established on 5 December 1936. It was initially called Kyrgyz ASSR (Kirghiz Autonomous Soviet Socialist Republic) and was a part of the Russian SFSR. On 15–19 April 1925, it was renamed Kazakh ASSR and on 5 December 1936 it became a Union Republic of the USSR called Kazakh SSR in the culminating act of the national delimitation in the Soviet Union. During the 1950s and 1960s Soviet citizens were urged to settle in the "Virgin Lands" of the Kazakh Soviet Socialist Republic. The influx of immigrants (mostly Russians and Ukrainians, but also some forcibly resettled ethnic minorities, such as the Volga Germans and the Chechens) skewed the ethnic mixture and enabled non-Kazakhs to outnumber natives. The influx also deprived the Kazakhs of much pasture land, making it increasingly difficult to sustain the nomadic way of life. Industry, and especially mining, developed. Russian and European culture began to influence Kazakh society.

In 1924, the borders of political units in Central Asia were changed along ethnic lines determined by Lenin's Commissar for Nationalities, Joseph Stalin. The Turkestan ASSR, the Bukharan People's Republic, and the Khorezm People's Republic were abolished and their territories were divided into eventually five separate Soviet Socialist Republics, one of which was the Uzbek Soviet Socialist Republic. The next year the Uzbek SSR became one of the republics of the Soviet Union.

Almaty is the largest city in Kazakhstan, with a population of 1,226,000 (as of 1 August 2005). The ethnic groups in a 2003 census were: Kazakh 43.6%, Russian 40.2%, Uyghur 5.7%, Tatar 2.1%, Korean 1.8%, Ukrainian 1.7%, German 0.7%.

Kyzil Orda / Kyzylorda was founded in 1820 as a Kokand fortress of Ak-Mechet (also spelt Aq Masjid, Aq Mechet, 'white mosque'). The name comes from the Kazakh for 'Red center'.

Uralsk / Oral was founded in 1613 by Cossacks, was originally named Yaitsk, after the Yaik River. The city was put under siege during the Russian Civil War. It has a population of 210,600. It is the capital of the West Kazakhstan Province. Ethnic composition is dominated by Russians (54%), Kazakhs (34%), along with a few Ukrainians and Germans.

==== Kirghizia ====
Flag and coat of arms of Kyrgyzstan

The Kirghiz Soviet Socialist Republic (sometimes spelled Kyrgyz), also known as Kirghizia, was one of fifteen constituent republics of the Soviet Union. Established on 14 October 1924 as the Kara-Kyrgyz Autonomous Oblast of the Russian SFSR, it was transformed into the Kyrgyz ASSR (Kyrgyz Autonomous Soviet Socialist Republic) on 1 February 1926, still being a part of the Russian SFSR. Today it is the independent state of Kyrgyzstan in Central Asia. Kyrgyz Autonomous Soviet Socialist Republic (Kyrgyz ASSR) was the name of two different national entities within Russian SFSR, in the territories of modern Kazakhstan and Kyrgyzstan.

On 5 December 1936, it became a separate constituent republic of the USSR as the Kyrgyz Soviet Socialist Republic during the final stages of the national delimitation in the Soviet Union.

Bishkek was the capital and the largest city of Kyrgyzstan and the Kirghiz ASSR, with a population of approximately 900,000 in 2005. In 1862, the Russian Empire destroyed the local fort and began to settle the area with Russian migrants. Over the years many fertile black soil farms were developed by the Tsarists and, later, the process carried on by the USSR. In 1926, the city became the capital of the newly established Kirghiz ASSR and was renamed Frunze after the Bolshevik hero Mikhail Frunze, one of Lenin's close associates who was born in Bishkek, until Kirghiz independence in 1991.

==== Tajikistan ====
Flag and coat of arms of Tajikistan

The Tajik Soviet Socialist Republic, also named Tajikistan (or by its Russian spelling, Tadzhikistan), was one of the new states created in Central Asia in 1924 was Uzbekistan, which had the status of a Soviet socialist republic. In 1929 Tajikistan was detached from Uzbekistan and given full status as a Soviet socialist republic. The city of Dushanbe would become an important regional hub on the border with Afghanistan.

Tajikistan has 3 exclaves, all of them located in the Fergana Valley region where Kyrgyzstan, Tajikistan and Uzbekistan meet. The largest is Vorukh (with an area between 95 – 130 km^{2}/37 – 50 sq mi, population estimated between 23,000 and 29,000, 95% Tajiks and 5% Kyrgyz, distributed among 17 villages), located 45 kilometres (28 mi) south of Isfara on the right bank of the river Karavshin, in Kyrgyz territory. Another exclave in Kyrgyzstan is a small settlement near the Kyrgyz railway station of Kairagach. The last is the village of Sarvan, which includes a narrow, long strip of land (about 15 km (9.3 mi) long by 1 km (over ½ mi) wide) alongside the road from Angren to Kokand; it is surrounded by Uzbek territory. There are no foreign enclaves within Tajikistan.

In 1931, the city formerly known as "Dyushambe" was renamed "Stalinabad" (after Joseph Stalin), but in 1961, as part of Nikita Khrushchev's de-Stalinization initiative, the city was renamed Dushanbe. The Soviets transformed the area into a centre for cotton and silk production, and relocated tens of thousands of people to the city from around the Soviet Union. The population also increased with thousands of ethnic Tajiks migrating to Tajikistan following the transfer of Bukhara and Samarkand to the Uzbek SSR. Dushanbe later became the home to a university and the Tajik Academy of Sciences. Dushanbe also had a relatively high military population during the war with Afghanistan.

==== Turkmenia ====
Flag and coat of arms of Turkmenistan

The Turkmen Soviet Socialist Republic which is also known as Turkmenia (or sometimes known as Turkmenistan) was one of fifteen constituent republics of the Soviet Union. It was initially established on 7 August 1921 as Turkmen Oblast of the Turkestan ASSR. On 13 May 1925 it was transformed into Turkmen SSR and became a separate republic of the Soviet Union. Today it is the independent state of Turkmenistan in Central Asia.

The Communist Party of the Turkmen SSR was the ruling communist party of the Turkmen SSR, and a part of the Communist Party of the Soviet Union. From 1985 it was led by Mr Saparmurat Niyazov, who in 1991 renamed the party to the Democratic Party of Turkmenistan, which is no longer a communist party . The current Communist Party of Turkmenistan is illegal.

Ashkhabad has a population of 695,300 (2001 census estimate) and has a primarily Turkmen population, with minorities of ethnic Russians, Armenians, and Azeris. It is 920 km from the second largest city in Iran, Mashhad. The principal industries are cotton textiles and metal working.

Merv / Mary is an ancient city. Its population was 123,000 in 1999. It has an interesting regional museum and lies near the remains of the ancient city of Merv, which, through its corrupted form, gives its name to the modern town. Carpets from the region of Merv are sometimes considered superior to the Persian ones.

==== Uzbekistan ====
Flag and coat of arms of Uzbekistan

The Uzbek Soviet Socialist Republic, also referred to as Uzbekistan, was created in 1924 when the new national boundaries separating the Uzbek and Kirghiz Soviet Socialist Republics cut off the eastern end of the Fergana Valley, as well as the slopes surrounding it. This was compounded in 1928 when the Tajik ASSR became a fully-fledged republic, the Tajik SSR, and the area around Khodjend was made a part of it. This blocked the valley's natural outlet and the routes to Samarkand and Bukhara, but none of these borders was of any great significance so long as Soviet rule lasted.

The Uzbek SSR included the Tajik ASSR until 1929, when the Tajik ASSR was upgraded to an equal status. In 1930, the Uzbek SSR capital was relocated from Samarkand to Tashkent. In 1936, the Uzbek SSR was enlarged with the addition of the Karakalpak ASSR taken from the Kazakh SSR in the last stages of the national delimitation in the Soviet Union. Further bits and pieces of territory were transferred several times between the Kazakh SSR and the Uzbek SSR after World War II. During the Great Purges of Joseph Stalin, many thousands of Chechens, Koreans and Crimean Tatars were exiled to the Uzbek SSR.

The State Anthem of the Uzbek SSR was the national anthem of Uzbekistan when it was a republic of the Soviet Union and known as the Uzbek SSR.

The city of Tashkent began to industrialize in the 1920s and 1930s, but industry increased tremendously during World War II, with the relocation of factories from western Russia to preserve the Soviet industrial capacity from the hostile invading Nazis. The Russian population increased dramatically as well, with evacuees from the war zones increasing the population to well over a million. (The Russian community would eventually comprise more than half of the total residents of Tashkent by the 1980s.) On 26 April 1966, Tashkent was destroyed by an earthquake and over 300,000 were left homeless. At the time of the collapse of the Soviet Union in 1991, Tashkent was the fourth largest Soviet city and a major center of learning in the fields of science and engineering.

As the nation's capital, Tashkent is still a fairly prosperous city and the capital of Uzbekistan and has a population of the city in 2006 was 2.1 million. The city has been the target of several terrorist acts since gaining independence. These have been attributed by the Uzbek the government to Islamic insurgents aided by the Afghan Taliban.

Samarkand is one of the oldest inhabited cities in the world, prospering from its location on the trade route between China and Europe (Silk Road). In 1370, Timur the Lame, or Tamerlane, decided to make Samarkand the capital of his empire, which extended from India to Turkey. Despite its status as the second largest city of Uzbekistan, the majority of the city's inhabitants are Persian-speaking Tajiks. The city became a rich trading center as a major capital of the Silk Road between China and the West. The Timurid dynasty's extensive building in Samarkand produced monuments that rank amongst some of the most striking in the Islamic world.

== Nationalist rebellions ==
=== Turkestan Autonomy ===
Flag of the Turkestan Autonomy, 1917–18

Kokand is a city in Fergana Province in eastern Uzbekistan, at the southwestern edge of the Fergana Valley. By 1999 it had a population of 192,500. Kokand is 228 km southeast of Tashkent, 115 km west of Andijan, and 88 km west of Fergana. It is nicknamed "City of Winds", or sometimes "Town of the Boar". It is at an altitude of 409 meters.

Kokand is on the crossroads of the ancient trade routes, at the junction of two main routes into the Fergana Valley, one leading northwest over the mountains to Tashkent, and the other west through Khujand. As a result, Kokand is the main transportation junction in the Fergana Valley.

Russian imperial forces under Mikhail Skobelev captured the city in 1876 which then became part of Russian Turkistan. With the fall of the Russian Empire, a provisional government attempted to maintain control in Tashkent. It was quickly overthrown and local Muslim opposition crushed. In April 1918, Tashkent became the capital of the Turkestan Autonomous Soviet Socialist Republic (Turkestan ASSR). It was the capital of the short-lived (1917–18) Anti-Bolshevik Provisional Government of Autonomous Turkistan (also known as the Turkestan Autonomy).

=== Alash Autonomy ===
The flag of the Kazakh's Alash Autonomy (Алаш Автономиясы). It was declared in 1917 and was dissolved in 1920.

The Alash Autonomy (Kazakh: Алаш Автономиясы, Alash Aýtonomıasy; Russian: Алашская Автономия, Alashskaya avtonomiya) was a state that existed between 13 December 1917 and 26 August 1920, located roughly on the territory of present-day Republic of Kazakhstan. The capital city was Semey (referred to at the time as Alash-qala).

The Alash Orda (Kazakh: Алаш Орда', Alaş Orda) was the name of the provisional Kazakh government between 13 December 1917 and 26 August 1920. It was led by Akhmet Baytursinuli, Alikhan Bokeikhanov and Mirjaqip Dulatuli amongst others.

The Alash Party proclaimed the autonomy of the Kazakh people in December 1917. Membership consists of 25 members (10 positions reserved for non-Kazakhs) and 15 member candidates. They formed special educational commission and established militia regiments as their armed forces.

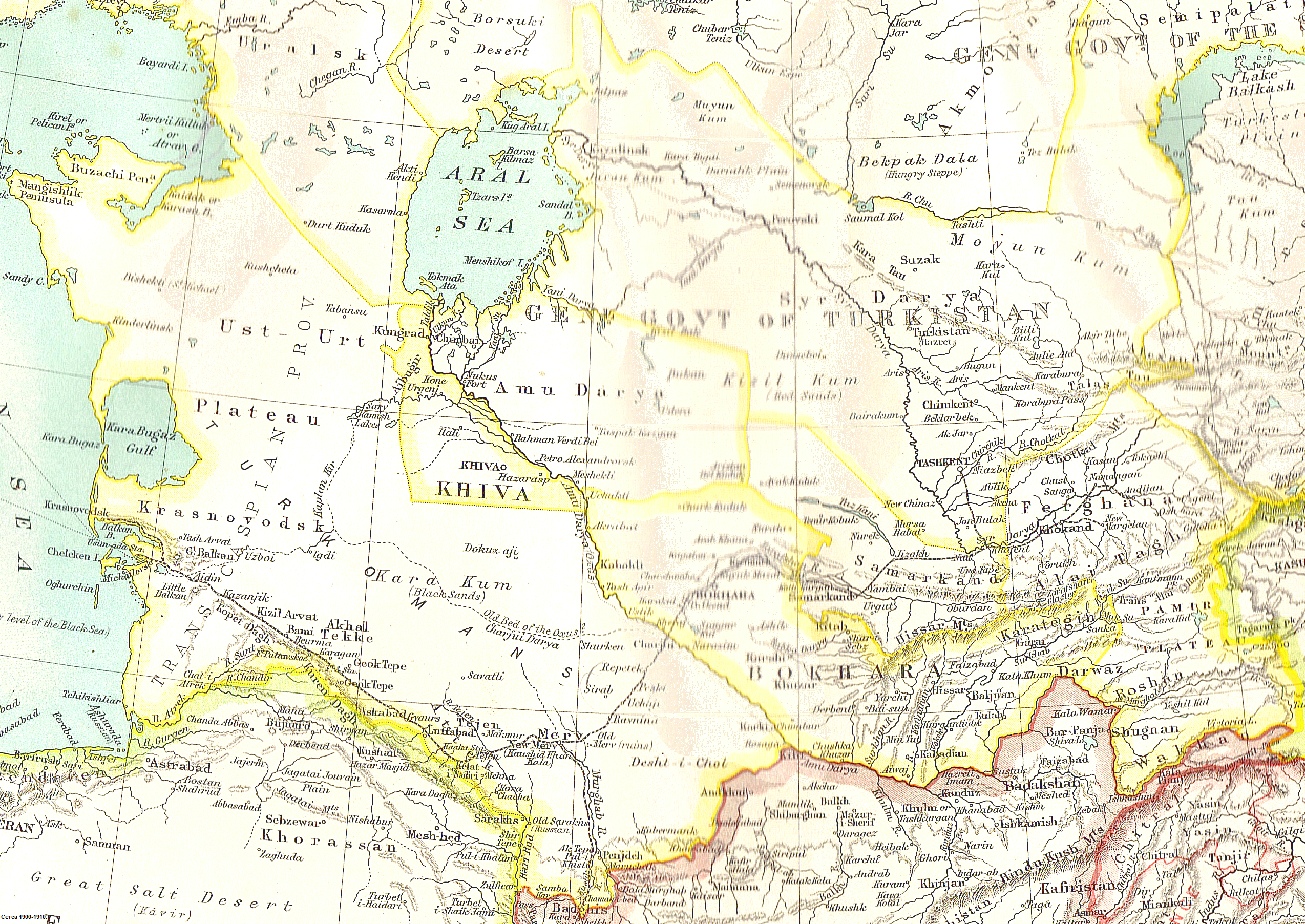
The borders of the Russian imperial territories of Khiva, Bukhara and Kokand in the time period of 1902–1903.

=== Basmachi revolt ===
In 1897, the railway reached Tashkent, and finally in 1906 a direct rail link with European Russia was opened across the steppe from Orenburg to Tashkent. This led to much larger numbers of Slavic settlers flowing into Turkestan than had hitherto been the case, and their settlement was overseen by a specially created Migration Department in St. Petersburg (Переселенческое Управление). This caused considerable discontent amongst the local population, Kyrgyz, Kazakhs and Sarts, as these settlers took scarce land and water resources away from them. In 1916 discontent boiled over in the Basmachi Revolt, sparked by a decree conscripting the natives into Labour battalions (they had previously been exempt from military service). Thousands of settlers were killed, and this was matched by Russian reprisals, particularly against the nomadic population. The competition for land and water which ensued between the Kazakhs and the newcomers caused great resentment against colonial rule during the final years of Tsarist Russia, with the most serious uprising, the Central Asian Revolt, occurring in 1916. The Kazakhs attacked Russian and Cossack villages, killing indiscriminately. The Russians' revenge was merciless. A military force drove 300,000 Kazakhs to flee into the mountains or to China. When approximately 80,000 of them returned the next year, many of them were slaughtered by Tsarist forces. Order had not really been restored by the time the February Revolution took place in 1917. This would usher in a still bloodier chapter in Turkestan's history, as the Bolsheviks of the Tashkent Soviet (made up entirely of Russian soldiers and railway workers, with no Muslim members) launched an attack on the autonomous Jadid government in Kokand early in 1918, which left 14,000 dead. Resistance to the Bolsheviks by the local population (dismissed as 'Basmachi' or 'Banditry' by Soviet historians) continued well into the 1920s.

=== Kengir uprising ===
During the rule of Joseph Stalin, a prison labour camp of the Steplag division of the Gulag was set up adjacent to the village of Kengir, near the River Kengir in central Kazakhstan. It was mentioned in Aleksandr Solzhenitsyn's book, The Gulag Archipelago. The location of the camp was near the city of Dzhezkazgan. Russian actor Oleg Yankovsky is the most famous of the city's natives. There was a prison revolt in 1954, by political prisoners, criminals, and other inmates.

=== Exiles ===
Dissident Islamist and anti-Soviet Central Asians fled to Afghanistan, British India, and to the Hijaz in Saudi Arabia. The last Emir of Bukhara Mohammed Alim Khan fled to Afghanistan. The Islamist Uzbek As-Sayyid Qāsim bin Abd al-Jabbaar Al-Andijaani(السيد قاسم بن عبد الجبار الأنديجاني) was born in Fergana valley's Andijan city in Turkestan (Central Asia). He went to British India was educated at Darul Uloom Deoband, and then returned to Turkestan where he preached against Communist Russian rule. He then fled to Afghanistan, then to British India and then to Hijaz where he continued his education in Mecca and Medina and wrote several works on Islam and engaged in anti-Soviet activities.

Uzbek exiles in Saudi Arabia from Soviet ruled Central Asia also adopted the identity "Turkistani". A lot of them are also called "Bukhari". A number of Saudi "Uzbeks" do not consider themselves as Uzbek and instead consider themselves as Muslim Turkestanis. Many Uzbeks in Saudi Arabia adopted the Arabic nisba of their home city in Uzbekistan, such as Al Bukhari from Bukhara, Al Samarqandi from Samarqand, Al Tashkandi from Tashkent, Al Andijani from Andijan, Al Kokandi from Kokand, Al Turkistani from Turkistan.

Bukhari and Turkistani were labels for all the Uzbeks in general while specific names for Uzbeks from different places were Farghani, Marghilani, Namangani, and Kokandi. Kokandi was used to refer to Uzbeks from Ferghana.

Shami Domullah introduced Salafism to Soviet Central Asia.

Mosques in Uzbekistan are funded by Saudi-based Uzbeks.

Saudis have tried to propagate their version of Islam into Uzbekistan following the collapse of the Soviet Union.

Saudi Arabia's "Bukharian brethren" were led by Nuriddin al-Bukhari as of 1990.

== Industry ==
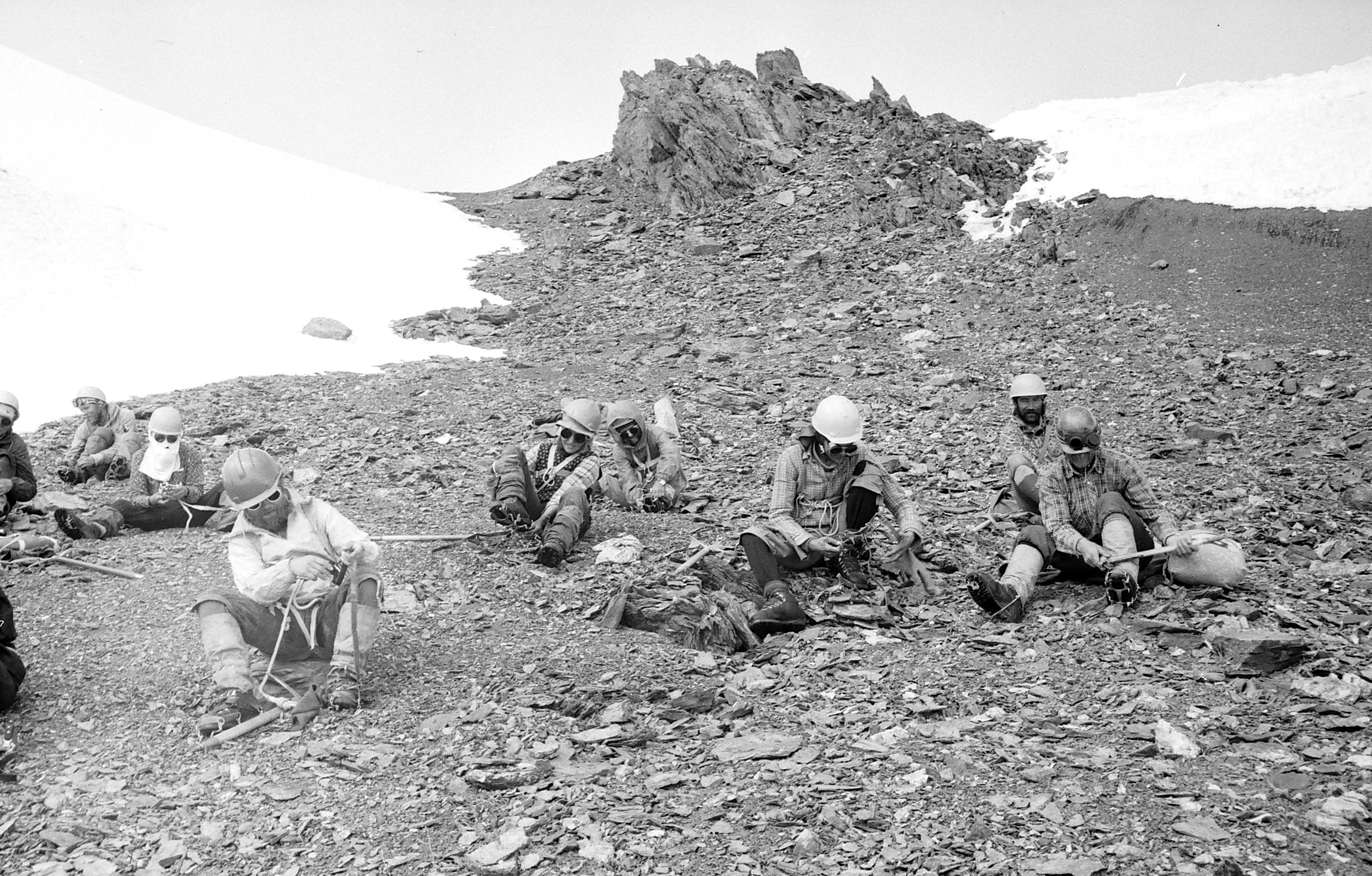
The highest peaks in the Soviet Union were located inside Central Asia, attracting mountaineers to the area.

=== Oil and gas ===
After World War II the Soviet Union rapidly industrialized Kazakhstan and started prospecting for oil in the whole of Soviet Central Asia. Oil was found in Uzbekistan and both oil and gas were found in Turkmenistan. These fuel supplies would prove invaluable to the region over the coming years.

The central part of the geological depression that forms the Ferghana Valley is characterized by block subsidence, originally to depths estimated at 6–7 km, largely filled with sediments that range in age as far back as the Permian-Triassic boundary. Some of the sediments are marine carbonates and clays. The faults are upthrusts and overthrusts. Anticlines associated with these faults form traps for petroleum and natural gas, which has been discovered in 52 small fields.

Kazakhstan's Mangystau Province has an area of 165,600 square kilometers and a population of 316,847. It is a major oil- and gas-producing region. The city of Aktau was built in Kazakhstan's Mangyshlak Peninsula as a small village to house the region's oil workers in 1961. Over the years a large influx of Russian and Ukrainian oil and chemical workers arrived. Engineers discovered large amounts of crude oil and petroleum in the area in the days of the Soviet Union, and when drilling commenced, much of the area was built up around the industry. Aktau is Kazakhstan's only seaport on the Caspian Sea.

From 1964 to 1991 Aktau, which had become a city, bore the name "Shevchenko" in honour of the Ukrainian poet Taras Shevchenko (1814–1861), who had been assigned to the area on military work. The average temperature on January is −3 °C, on July +26 °C. Annual rainfall averages 150 mm. Aktau had a population of 154,500 as of 2004.

=== Transport ===
Much of the road and railway infrastructure that exists across Central Asia was developed when the areas was in the Soviet Union. As a result, it often disregards existing national borders. After the dissolution of the Soviet Union, this infrastructure has faced decline and degradation.

=== Metallurgy ===
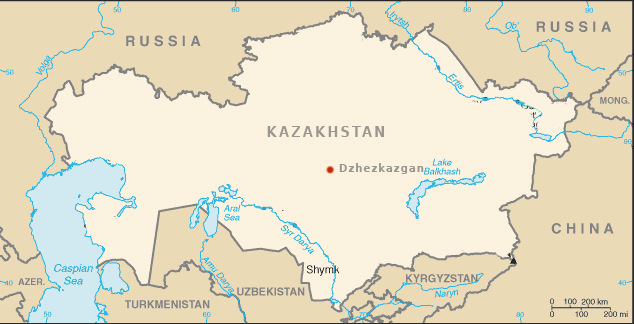
Location of Zhezkazgan, Kazakhstan

Kazakhstan had started to produce and refine sizable amounts of tin and uranium by the early 1970s. Vanadium and cobalt were, and still are also mined in the south of the country. Uranium was also first produced in Uzbekistan in the 1970s.

The city of Zhezkazgan was created in 1938 in connection with the exploitation of the rich local copper deposits. In 1973 a large mining and metallurgical complex was constructed to the southeast to smelt the copper that until then had been sent elsewhere for processing. Other metal ores mined and processed locally are manganese, iron and gold. It is on a reservoir of the Kara-Kengir River and has a population of 90,000 (1999 census).

Its urban area includes the neighbouring mining town of Satpayev, total population 148,700. 55% of the population are Kazakhs, 30% Russians, with smaller minorities of Ukrainians, Germans, Chechens and Koreans. Dzhezkazgan has an extreme continental climate. The average temperature ranges from +24 °C (75 °F) in July to −16 °C (3 °F) in January.

Today the city is the headquarters of the copper conglomerate Kazakhmys, the city's main employer. The company has subsidiaries in China, Russia, France and the UK and is listed on the London Stock Exchange.

=== Cement ===
Cement was a major product in both the cities of Shymkent and Dushanbe in the south of the region.

=== Hydro-electricity ===
By the early 1970s, the Soviets had started to build some of their hydroelectric power stations in Eastern Kazakhstan, Kyrgyzstan and Tajikistan as part of an overall development strategy. The waters of the Ili River and of Lake Balkhash are considered to be of a vital economic importance to Kazakhstan. The Ili river is dammed for hydroelectric power at Kaptchagayskoye, and the river waters are heavily diverted for agricultural irrigation and for industrial purposes. In Tajikistan, the Vakhsh River, main tributary of the Amu Darya, is dammed multiple times, including the Nurek Dam (highest dam in the world at time of construction) and the still-under-construction Rogun Dam.

=== Cotton ===
The Soviets began to grow cotton in Uzbekistan after the Virgin Lands project and the mass use of the isolated and now shrinking Aral Sea for desert irrigation in the early 1960s. A massive expansion of irrigation canals during the Soviet period, to irrigate cotton fields, wrought ecological carnage to the area, with the river drying up long before reaching the Aral Sea which, as a result, has shrunk to a small remnant of its former size.

=== Baikonur Cosmodrome ===
The Baikonur Cosmodrome was founded in Kazakhstan on 2 June 1955, during the Cold War, as one of many long-range nuclear missile bases in the region, but diverged into space travel.

On 8 June 2005 the Russian Federation Council ratified an agreement between Russia and Kazakhstan extending Russia's rent term of the spaceport until 2050.

== Culture, religion and ethnicity ==
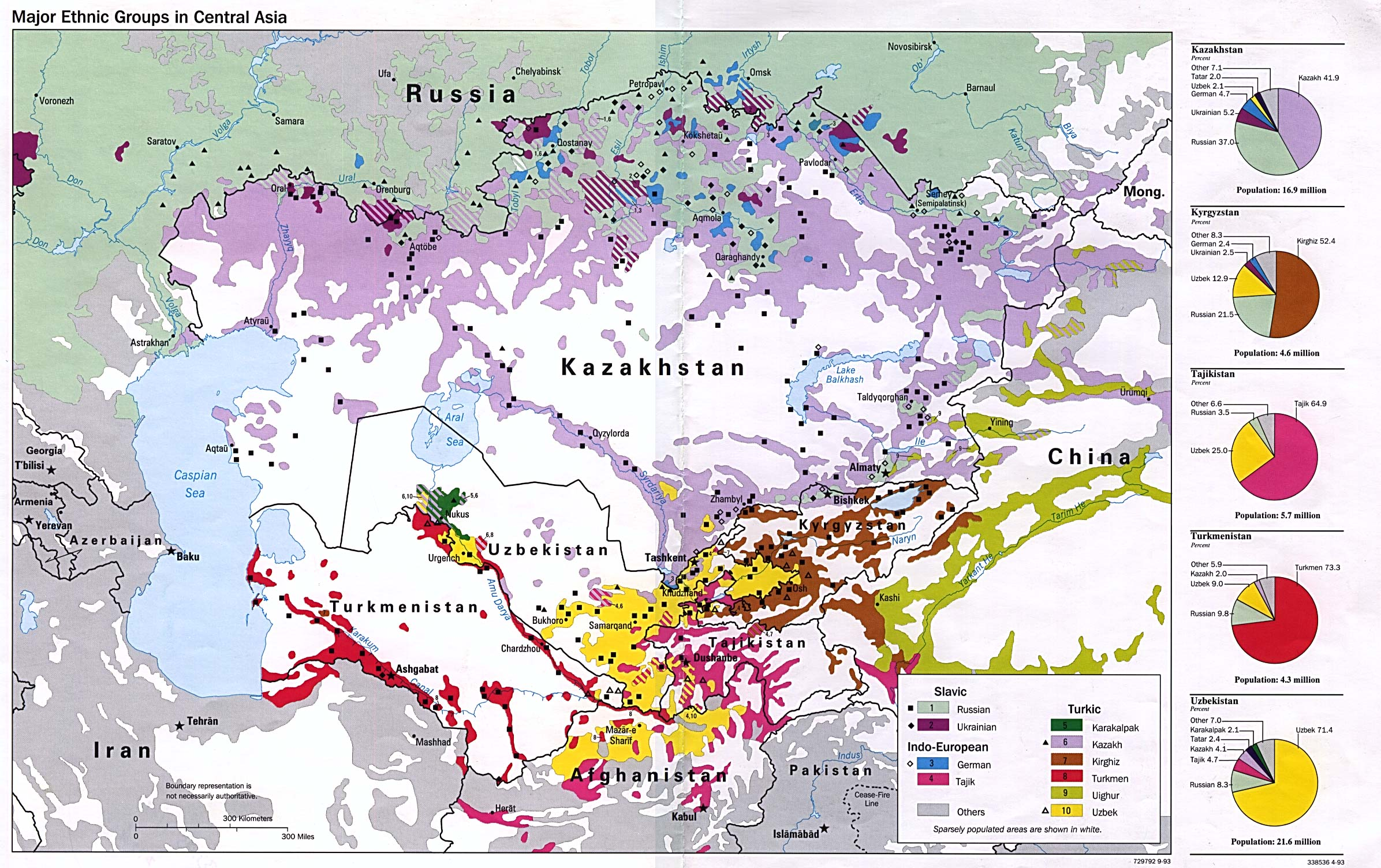
The Ethnic and linguistic patchwork of Soviet Central Asia

Following a series of migrations, mostly predating Soviet rule, that displaced the autochthonous Iranian peoples, most of the inhabitants of Soviet Central Asia were speakers of either Kipchak languages (such as Kazakhs), Uyghuric languages (Uzbeks) or Oghuz languages (Turkmens). Those populations were nomadic and settled, respectively. There remained traces of some settled farming and urban Iranian communities like the Tajiks and Bukhara in the south, and nomadic Mongolic Kyrgiz on the border with China.

In Kazakh [qɑzɑqtɑr]; Russian: Казахи; the English name 'Kazakh' is transliterated from Russian) are Turkic people of the northern parts of Central Asia (largely Kazakhstan, but also found in parts of Uzbekistan, China, Russia, and Mongolia).

According to Robert G. Gordon Jr., editor of the Ethnologue: Languages of the World, classifies Kalmyk-Oirat under the Oirat-Khalkha group, since he contends that Kalmyk-Oirat is related to Khalkha Mongolian – the national language of Mongolia. The descent of the Kyrgyz from the autochthonous Siberian population is confirmed on the other hand by recent genetic studies.

The Slavic community would grow very rapidly under communism and Russians would eventually become a major ethnic group in the region. The Slavic population followed Orthodox Christianity, while the rest were mostly Sunni Muslims. Various nationality, such as the Meskhetian Turks and Volga Germans would get banished to the region. Over the years ethnic groups changed. Uralsk and Oral are now Russians (54%) and Kazakhs (34%), while it's also Kazakh 43.6% and Russian 40.2% in Almaty.

=== Religion ===
The Bolsheviks would quickly set about closing mosques and churches throughout the USSR. This became particularly prevalent in the 1930s, but had been fully abandoned by the 1980s.

=== Veil ===
In Uzbekistan and Tajikistan women wore veils which covered their entire face and body like the Paranja and faranji.

The traditional veil in Central Asia worn before modern times was the faranji but it was banned by the Soviet Communists.

=== Y-haplogroups ===
According to the interim results of Kazach mitochondrial DNA studies (where sample consisted of only 246 individuals), the main maternal lineages of Kazakhs are: D (17.9%), C (16%), G (16%), A (3.25%), F (2.44%), which is of eastern-Eurasian origin (58%), and haplogroups H (13%), T (4.07%), J (4.07%), K (4.07%), U5 (3.25%), I (0.41%), V (0.81%), W (1.63%), of western Eurasian origin (41%).

The on a similar level, the distribution of Y-DNA haplogroups, according to E.K. Husnutdinova, (sample size is 331) is the following: C (25.3%), J (18.2%), N (15.2%), R (10.1%).

==== R1a ====
The descent of the Kyrgyz from the autochthonous Siberian population is confirmed on the other hand by the recent genetic studies (The Eurasian Heartland: A continental perspective on Y-chromosome diversity). Remarkably, 63% of modern Kyrgyz men share Haplogroup R1a1 (Y-DNA) with Tajiks (64%), Ruthenians (54%), Poles and Hungarians (≈60%), and even Icelanders (25%). Haplogroup R1a1 (Y-DNA) is believed to be a marker of the Proto-Indo-European language speakers.

==== R-Z93 (R1a1a1b2) ====
This large subclade appears to encompass most of the R1a1a found in Asia (Pamjav 2012).

== See also ==
- Hujum
- Bamboo Curtain
- Russian Turkestan
- Central Asia
- Greater Central Asia
