= Berdibek Soqpaqbaev =

Kazakh Children's author

- Бердібек Соқпақбаев
- Born: 15 October 1924; Qostöbe, Qaraqol-Naryn okrug, Kara-Kirghiz Autonomous Oblast, RSFSR, Soviet Union
- Died: 24 July 1991 (aged 66); Alma-Ata, Alma-Ata Oblast, Kazakh SSR, Soviet Union
- Occupation: writer

Berdibek Ydyrysuly Soqpaqbaev (15 October 1924 – 24 July 1991) was a Kazakh children's writer, poet, and screenwriter. One of his most noted works is the novel My Name is Qoja which has been translated to 68 languages and adapted to film. The book tells several stories from the childhood of Qoja, a mischievous but lovable child living in a village of Soviet Kazakhstan. Academicians have compared the novel to the stories of Tom Sawyer and Huckleberry Finn, particularly in their portrayal of the circumstances of average people in their respective places and times.

His works have had a profound impact on Kazakh literature and film.

My Name is Qoja was adapted to film in 1963.

== Centennial celebration ==
In 2024, UNESCO held a session at its Paris headquarters to commemorate the life and works of the author, where a new French language translation of Kozha was presented. Centennial celebrations were also held in libraries in Kazakhstan.

== Selected bibliography ==
A full bibliography is available on Kazakh Wikipedia article.

My Name is Qoja
Soqpaqbaev, Berdībek (2016). "My Name is Kozha". Metropolitan Classics. ISBN 978-1574800029.
Soqpaqbaev, Berdībek (1957). "Менің атым Қожа. Повестер.". Atamūra. ISBN 9965-05-889-X.
Adapted to film in 1963 by Kazakhfilm.
Journey to Childhood
"Балалық шаққа саяхат". 1960. ISBN 978-601-06-5627-7.
Adapted to film in 1965.
