= Kirghiz Autonomous Socialist Soviet Republic (1926–1936) =

Autonomous republic of the Russian SFSR, Soviet Union

Kirghiz Autonomous Soviet Socialist Republic Киргизская Автономная Советская Социалистическая Республика Кыргыз Автономиялуу Социалисттик Советтик Республикасы
- ASSR of the Russian SFSR
- 1926–1936
- Flag

- Map of the Kirghiz Autonomous Socialist Soviet Republic in 1928
- Capital: Pishpek (modern-day Bishkek)
- Demonym: Kyrgyz or Kirghiz
- Historical era: Interwar period/20th century
  - Established: 1 February 1926
  - Disestablished: 5 December 1936
Preceded by	Succeeded by
Kara-Kirghiz Autonomous Oblast	Kirghiz Soviet Socialist Republic
- Today part of: Kyrgyzstan

The Kirghiz Autonomous Socialist Soviet Republic (Russian: Киргизская АССР, Kyrgyz: Кыргыз Автономиялуу Социалисттик Советтик Республикасы) was an autonomous republic of the Soviet Union within the Russian Soviet Federative Socialist Republic existing from 1926 until 1936. It was preceded by the Kara-Kirghyz Autonomous Oblast, which itself was formed in 1924, and was reorganized into the Kirghyz ASSR in 1926.

The Kirghiz ASSR was created on 1 February 1926, roughly six years later than the Kazakh ASSR, in the former region of Soviet Central Asia, within the Russian SFSR, when the Kirghiz AO was reorganized as an ASSR.

On 5 December 1936, it was elevated to the Kirghiz SSR (independent of the Russian SFSR), one of the constituent republics of the Soviet Union.

== Map ==
Map of Kirghiz Autonomous Socialist Soviet Republic in Енукидзе А. С. (1928). Атлас Союза Советских Социалистических Республик, p. 66a [Document page 121].
