= Turar Ryskulov =

Soviet politician

- Турар Рыскулов; Тұрар Рысқұлов
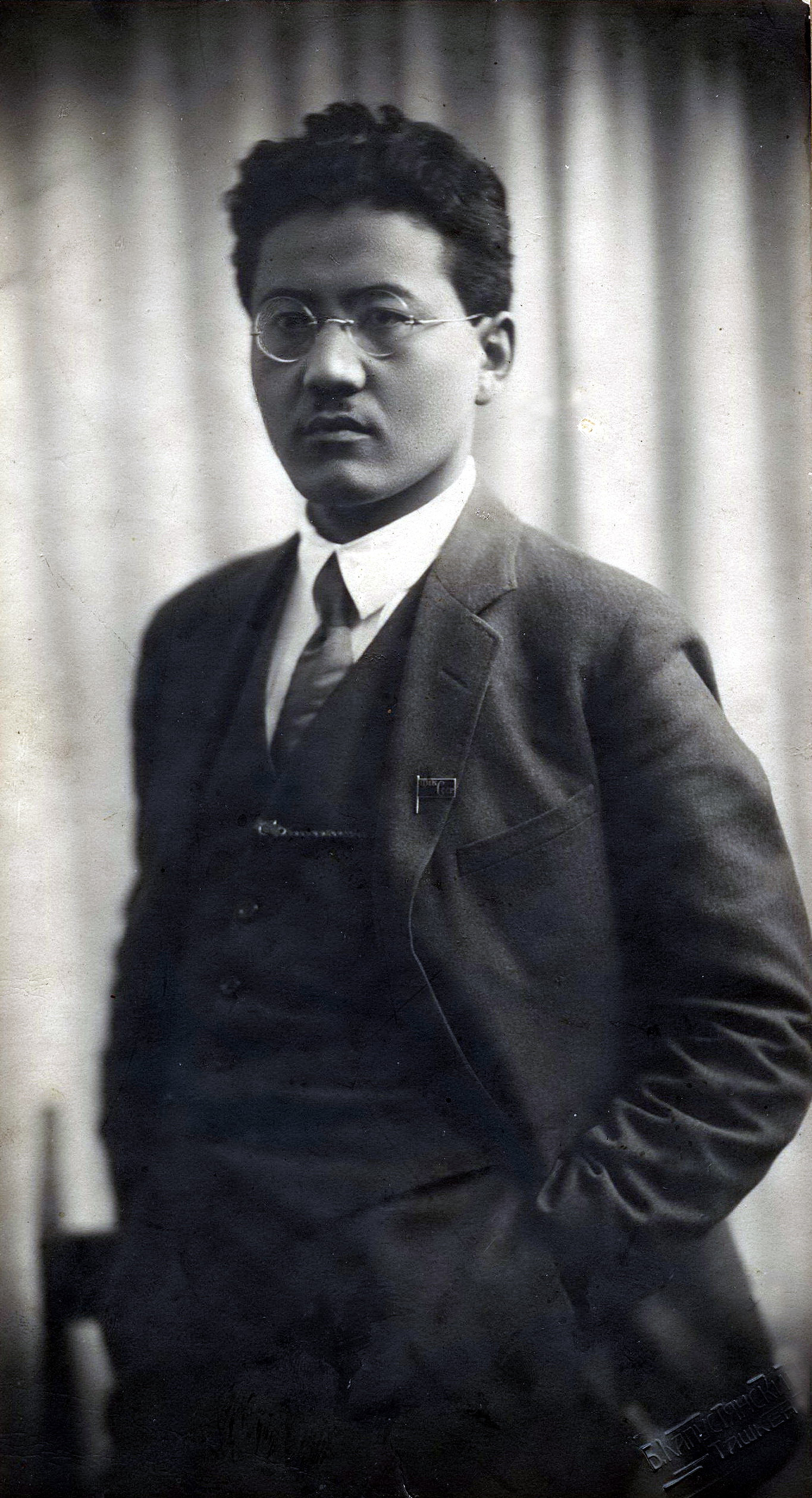

Chairman of the Central Executive Committee of the TASSR
- In office January 1920 – 21 July 1920
- Preceded by: Ivan Apin
- Succeeded by: Mukhammedzhan Biserov

Chairman of the Council of People's Commissars of the TASSR
- In office October 1922 – 1924
- Preceded by: Gaýgysyz Atabaýew
- Succeeded by: Sharustam Islamov

Personal details
- Born: 26 December 1894 Semirechye Oblast, Russian Empire
- Died: 10 February 1938 (aged 43) Moscow, Russian SFSR, USSR
- Citizenship: USSR
- Occupation: politician

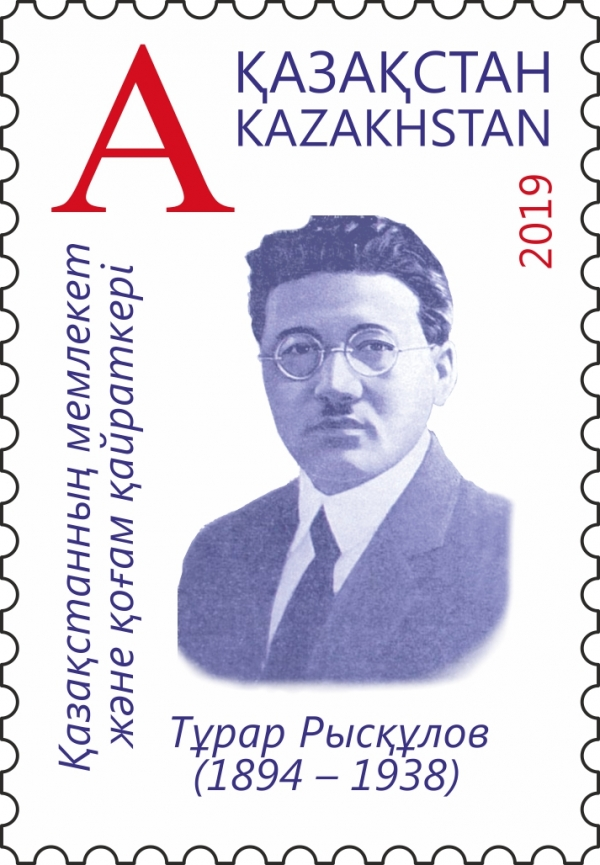
Ryskulov on a 2019 stamp of Kazakhstan

Turar Ryskululy Ryskulov (Kazakh: Тұрар Рысқұлұлы Рысқұлов, Tūrar Rysqūlūly Rysqūlov; Russian: Турар Рыскулович Рыскулов; 26 December 1894 – 10 February 1938) was a Soviet politician, the chairman of the Central Executive Committee of the Turkestan Autonomous Soviet Socialist Republic (i.e. the head of state).

Ryskulov was born on 26 December 1894 in East-Talgar volost of Semirechensk Province (now Talgar District of Almaty Region), in the family of a nomadic herder. He took part in the Central Asian revolt of 1916 and then in the Russian Revolution in Turkestan and Kyrgyzstan. After the Red Army had taken Tashkent in 1920, he was appointed Chairman of the Central Executive Committee of the Turkestan Soviet Republic, which then included all of Russian-ruled Central Asia until he was replaced with Mukhammedzhan Biserov. Ryskulov proposed that Turkestan should be an independent republic ruled by a Turkic Communist Party, separate from the All-Russian Communist Party. This proposal was overruled by Vladimir Lenin, who summoned Ryskulov to Moscow in May 1920 and persuaded him to abandon the idea.

In 1921–1922, Ryskulov was appointed Deputy People's Commissar for Nationalities under Joseph Stalin, who was People's Commissar. In June 1923, Stalin accused him of "pan-Turkism" and of having been a supporter of Mirsaid Sultan-Galiev, the leader of the Tatar communists, who was under arrest. Ryskulov retorted by pointing out that Stalin had himself praised Sultan-Galiev as a devoted communist, before the political situation changed.

In 1922, he returned to Tashkent and was Chairman of the Council of People's Commissars of the Turkestan Republic until 1924, when the region was divided into four republics: Kyrgyzstan, Tajikistan, Turkmenistan, and Uzbekistan.

In 1924, Ryskulov was transferred to the staff of the Communist International and was posted in Ulaanbaatar as chief Soviet adviser to the Mongolian People's Party, in which capacity he assisted in the creation of Mongolian People's Republic. In 1926–1937, he was deputy chairman of the Council of Ministers of the Russian republic.

== Arrest and death ==
Ryskulov was arrested during the Great Purge, on 21 May 1937. He was tried and sentenced to death on 8 February 1938, and was executed two days later.

== Legacy ==
Ryskulov was "rehabilitated" on 8 December 1956, meaning that the criminal case against him was invalidated, though Soviet sources continued to accuse him of "political errors".

Today he is considered a national hero and honored with a large statue at the entrance of Kazakhstan Economic University in Almaty, which was renamed the Turar Ryskulov University. The Turar Ryskulov District and the city of Imeni Turara Ryskulova in Kazakhstan are named after him, and all of Kazazhstan's major cities have streets named after him.
