= Tajik Autonomous Soviet Socialist Republic =

1924–1929 autonomous republic in the Uzbek SSR, Soviet Union

Coordinates: 39°N 71°E

Tajik Autonomous Soviet Socialist Republic Таджикская Автономная Социалистическая Советская Республика (Russian) Çumhuriji Muxtori Şūraviji Sotsialistiji Toçikston (Tajik) (Note: جمهوريت اجتماعی شوروى مختار تاجيكستان written in the Persian alphabet, then obsolete and disused during Soviet times.) (Note: Ҷумҳурии Мухтори Шӯравии Сотсиалистии Тоҷикистон written in the Cyrillic script, which hadn't been used during this time period.)
- ASSR of the Uzbek Soviet Socialist Republic
- 1924–1929
- Flag Coat of arms

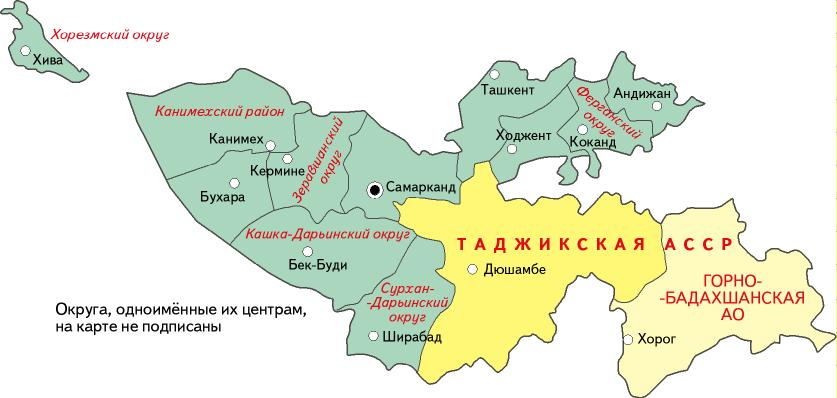
- Location of the Tajik ASSR within the Uzbek SSR
- Capital: Dushanbe
- Government
  - Type: Soviet republic
- History
  - Established: 14 October 1924
  - Disestablished: October 1929
Preceded by	Succeeded by
Turkestan ASSR	Tajik SSR

The Tajik Autonomous Soviet Socialist Republic (Note: Tajik: Ҷумҳурии Мухтори Шӯравии Сотсиалистии Тоҷикистон, Çumhuriji Muxtori Şūraviji Sotsialistiji Toçikiston; Russian: Таджикская Автономная Социалистическая Советская Республика, romanized: Tadzhikskaya Avtonomnaya Sotsialisticheskaya Sovetskaya Respublika; Uzbek: Тожикистон Автоном Совет Социалистик Республикаси, Toçikiston Avtonom Sovet Sotsialistik Respublikasi) (Tajik ASSR) was an autonomous republic within the Uzbek SSR in the Soviet Union. It was created on 14 October 1924 by a series of legal acts that partitioned the three existing regional entities in Central Asia – Turkestan ASSR, Bukharan People's Soviet Republic, and Khorezm People's Soviet Republic – into five new entities based on ethnic principles: Uzbek SSR, Turkmen SSR, Tajik ASSR (within Uzbek SSR), Kara-Kirghiz Autonomous Oblast (as a province of Russian SFSR), and Karakalpak Autonomous Oblast (as a province of Kazak ASSR).

The capital of Tajik ASSR was in Dyushambe. In October 1929, under the initiative of Shirinsho Shotemur, the Tajik ASSR was transformed into a full-fledged Soviet Socialist Republic and became Tajik SSR, which additionally absorbed the Khujand region (today's Sughd Province in northern Tajikistan) from Uzbek SSR. The capital Dyushambe was renamed Stalinabad in honor of Joseph Stalin.

Like in other Soviet Socialist Republics, the processes of industrialization and collectivization started in 1927 and continued until the end of the 1930s. Terror was often used to coerce farmers into forced collectivization, and this led to anti-government resistance in the years spanning from 1930 to 1936. Stalinist purges hit many members of the Communist Party of Tajikistan, and this led to the elimination of around 10,000 people (70% of the Party members). The people of Tajikistan suffered also from forced relocation: in the 1950s-1960s, inhabitants of the mountain regions of the country were deported to urban centers were workforce was needed, while in 1951–1952, 3,000 Basmachis were deported to Siberia.
