= Turkestan Autonomous Soviet Socialist Republic =

1918–1923 autonomous republic of the Russian SFSR

Coordinates: 41°18′40″N 69°16′47″E

Turkestan Autonomous Soviet Socialist Republic Туркестанская Автономная Советская Социалистическая Республика
- ASSR of the Russian SFSR
- 1918–1924
- Flag Emblem

- Map of Soviet Central Asia in 1922, indicating the location and extent of the Turkestan ASSR (brown).
- Capital: Tashkent
- Historical era: Interwar era
  - Established: 30 April 1918
  - Disestablished: 27 October 1924
Preceded by
Turkestan Autonomy
Transcaspian Government
Succeeded by
Uzbek SSR
Turkmen SSR
Tajik ASSR
Kara-Kirghiz AO
Karakalpak AO

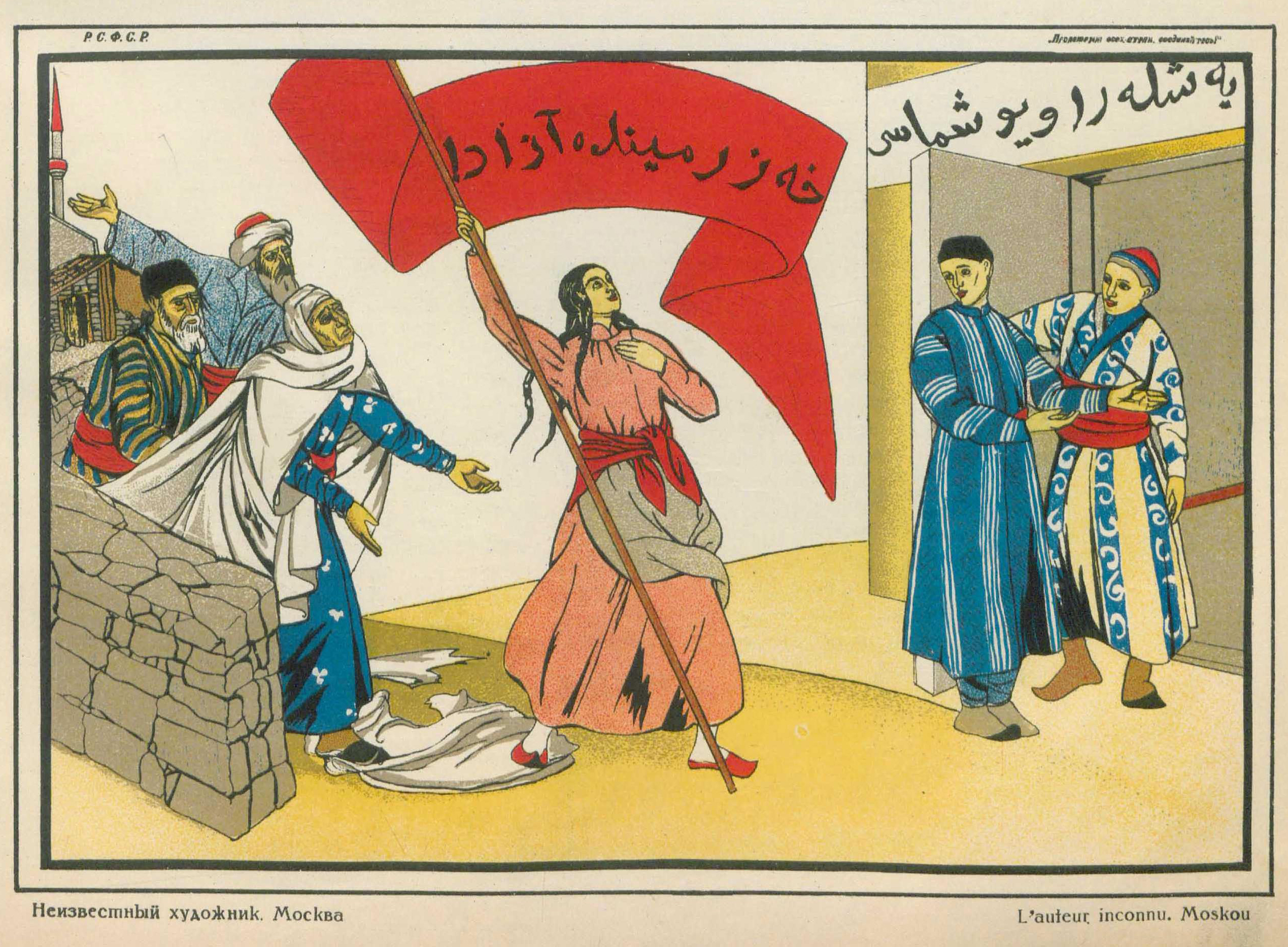
1921 propaganda image encouraging women to join the Komsomol; a Turkic woman waves a flag with legend "I am free now too."

The Turkestan Autonomous Soviet Socialist Republic (TASSR; Russian: Туркестанская Автономная Советская Социалистическая Республика, romanized: Turkestanskaya Avtonomnaya Sovetskaya Sotsialisticheskaya Respublika; Uzbek: Turkiston Avtonom Sovet Sotsialistik Respublikasi), originally called the Turkestan Soviet Federative Republic, was an autonomous republic of the Russian Soviet Federative Socialist Republic located in Soviet Central Asia which existed between 1918 and 1924. Uzbeks were the preeminent nation of the Turkestan ASSR. Tashkent was the capital and largest city in the region.

== Name ==
Date	Name
30 April 1918	Turkestan Soviet Federative Republic (constitution adopted 15 October 1918)
24 September 1920	Turkestan Autonomous Soviet Socialist Republic (constitution approved 24 September 1920)
30 December 1922	Turkestan A.S.S.R. (within Russian S.F.S.R., part of Soviet Union)

== History ==
During the Russian Empire, the Turkestan ASSR's territory was governed as Turkestan Krai, the Emirate of Bukhara, and the Khanate of Khiva. From 1905, Pan-Turkist ideologues like Ismail Gasprinski aimed to suppress differences among the peoples who spoke Turkic languages, uniting them into one government.

This idea was supported by Vladimir Lenin, and after the Russian Revolution of 1917, the Bolsheviks in Tashkent created the Turkestan ASSR. But in February 1918, the Islamic Council (Uzbek: Shoʻro-i Islomiyya) and the Council of Intelligentsia (Uzb. Shoʻro-i Ulamo) met in Kokand city and declared a rival Turkestan Autonomous Republic, battling Bolshevik forces until the 1920s as part of the conservative Basmachi rebellion.

The Turkestan Soviet Federative Republic was officially proclaimed on 30 April 1918. However, its sphere of influence at this time was limited to only a few railway junctions.

In the late 1917, the TSFR was cut off from the RSFSR by the revolt of the Orenburg Cossacks, but held out, despite being surrounded by hostile states, until the arrival of the Red Army in September 1919 after the Eastern Front Counteroffensive.

Meanwhile, a power struggle among the Communists ensued between those favoring a Pan-Turkist government like Turar Ryskulov and Tursun Khojaev, and those in favor of dividing Soviet Turkestan into smaller ethnic or regional units, such as Fayzulla Xoʻjayev and Akmal Ikramov. The latter group won, as national delimitation in Central Asia began in 1924. Upon dissolution, the Turkestan ASSR was split into Uzbek SSR (now Uzbekistan), Turkmen SSR (now Turkmenistan) with the Tajik ASSR (now Tajikistan), Kara-Kirghiz Autonomous Oblast (now Kyrgyzstan), and Karakalpak Autonomous Oblast (now Autonomous Republic of Uzbekistan as Karakalpakstan).

== Flag ==
Flag of Turkestan ASSR (1919–1920)

Flag of Turkestan ASSR (1921–1924)

== Chairmen of the Central Executive Committee ==
1. Kobozev, Pyotr Alekseevich (April – May 1918), Solkin, Andrey Fedorovich, contributor (April – 2 June 1918)
2. Tobolin, Ivan Osipovich (2 June – 5 October 1918)
3. Votintsev, Vsevolod Dmitrievich (October 1918 – 19 January 1919)
4. – (19 January – 31 March 1919)
5. Kazakov, Aristarkh Andreevich (31 March – July 1919)
6. Kobozev, Pyotr Alekseevich (July – September 1919)
7. Apin, Ivan Andreevich (September 1919 – January 1920)
8. Ryskulov, Turar Ryskulovich (January – 21 July 1920)
9. Biserov, Mukhammedzhan (21 July – August 1920)
10. Rakhimbaev, Abdullo Rakhimbaevich (4 August 1920 – May 1921), Khodzhanov Sultanbek, acting, prev. (12 May 1920 – ?)
11. Tyuryakulov, Nazir Tyuryakulovich (May 1921 – June 1922)
12. Rakhimbaev, Abdullo Rakhimbaevich (June – October 1922)
13. Khidir-Aliev, Inagadzhan (October 1922 – 1 January 1924), Dadabaev Butabay, vrid. prev. (August – September 1923)
14. Aytakov, Nedirbai (9 January – November 1924)

Chairmen of the Council of People's Commissars ("Turksovnarkom").

Initial date	Final date	Name
15 November 1917	November 1918	Fyodor Kolesov
November 1918	19 January 1919	Vladislav Figelskiy (ru)
19 January 1919	31 March 1919	Post vacant
31 March 1919	12 September 1919	Karp Sorokin (ru)
12 September 1919	March 1920	Turksovnarkom defunct
March 1920	May 1920	Jānis Rudzutaks
May 1920	September 1920	Isidor Lubimov
19 September 1920	October 1922	Kaikhaziz Atabayev
October 1922	12 January 1924	Turar Ryskulov
12 January 1924	27 October 1924	Sharustam Islamov (ru)
