= Kara-Kirghiz Autonomous Oblast =

1924–1926 autonomous oblast of the Russian SFSR, Soviet Union

Kara-Kirghiz Autonomous Oblast Кара-Кыргыз өзэркин облусу
- Autonomous oblast of the Russian SFSR
- 1924–1926
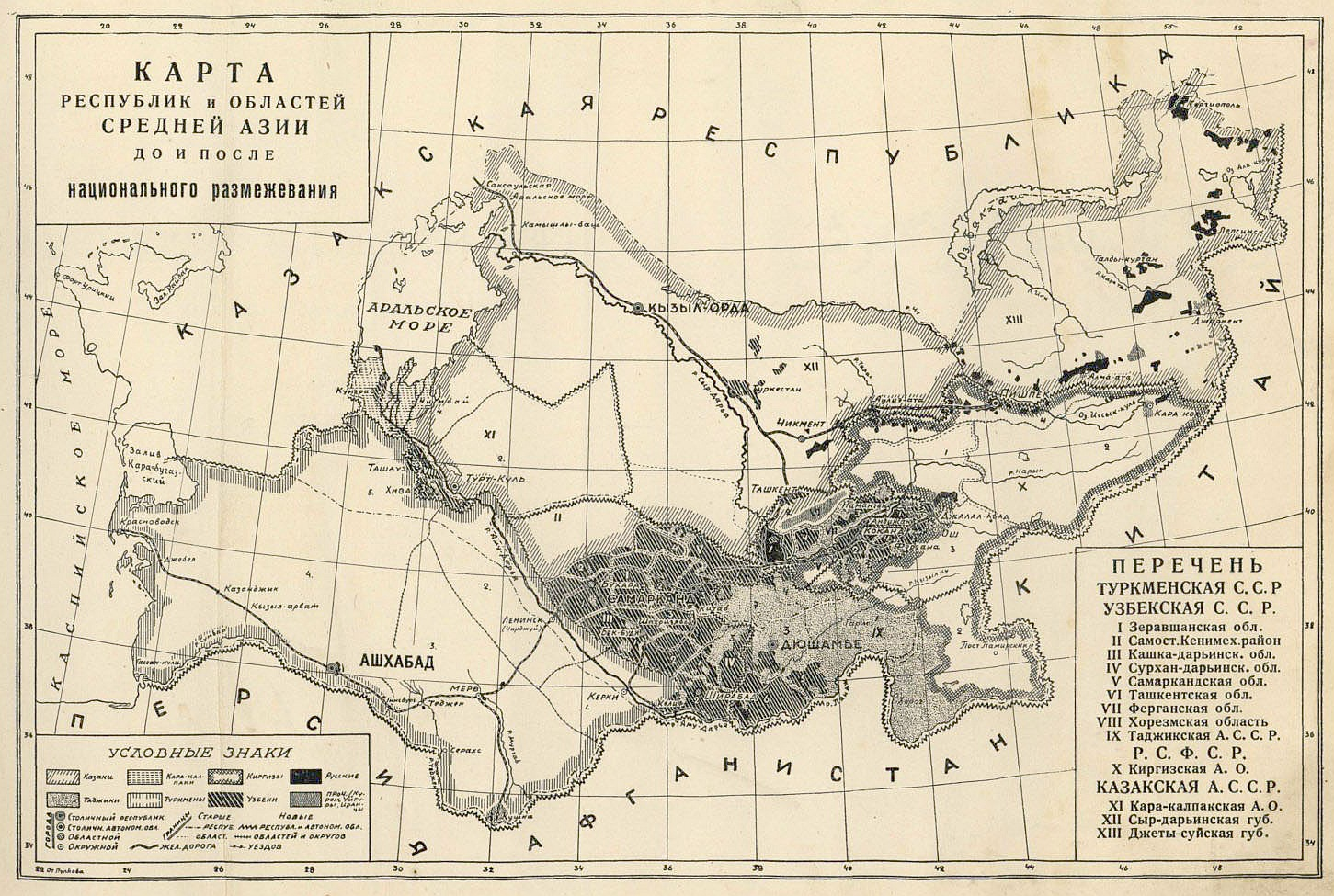
- Map of the Kirghiz Autonomous Oblast' (formerly the Kara-Kirghiz Autonomous Oblast') in 1925, the Murghob District was part of the Kara-Kyrgyz Autonomous Oblast.
- Capital: Pishpek
- Historical era: Colonization period
  - Creation of Kara-Kirghiz Autonomous Oblast: 14 October 1924
  - renamed as Kirghiz AO: 15 May 1925
  - reorganized as Kirghiz ASSR: 1 February 1926
Preceded by	Succeeded by
Turkestan Autonomous Soviet Socialist Republic	Kirghiz Autonomous Socialist Soviet Republic (1926–1936)

The Kara-Kirghiz Autonomous Oblast, (Note: Russian: Кара-Киргизская автономная область; Kyrgyz: Кара-Кыргыз өзэркин облусу, romanized: Kara-Kyrgyz özerkin oblusu) abbreviated as Kara-Kirghiz AO (Note: Russian: Кара-Киргизская АО; Kyrgyz: Кара-Кыргыз АО) or KAO (Note: Russian: КАО; Kyrgyz: КӨО, romanized: KÖO) in the former region of Soviet Central Asia, was created on 14 October 1924 within the Russian SFSR from the predominantly Kyrgyz part of the Turkestan Autonomous Soviet Socialist Republic. On 15 May 1925 it was renamed the Kirghiz Autonomous Oblast. On 1 February 1926 it was reorganized into the Kirghiz ASSR (not to be confused with the other Kirghiz ASSR, the original name of the Kazakh ASSR). On 5 December 1936 it became the Kirghiz SSR, one of the constituent republics of the Soviet Union.

== Etymology ==
Kara-Kirghiz is a former name for the Kyrgyz or Kirghiz people that literally means "the black Kyrgyz", in reference to the colour of the tents the nomads used.
