= Kazakh Autonomous Socialist Soviet Republic =

1920–1936 autonomous republic of the Russian SFSR

1920–1936: Kazakh Autonomous Socialist Soviet Republic Казахская Автономная Социалистическая Советская Республика (Russian) Қазақ Автономиялы Социалистік Кеңестік Республикасы (Kazakh)
- ASSR of the Russian SFSR
- 1920–1936
- Flag Coat of arms

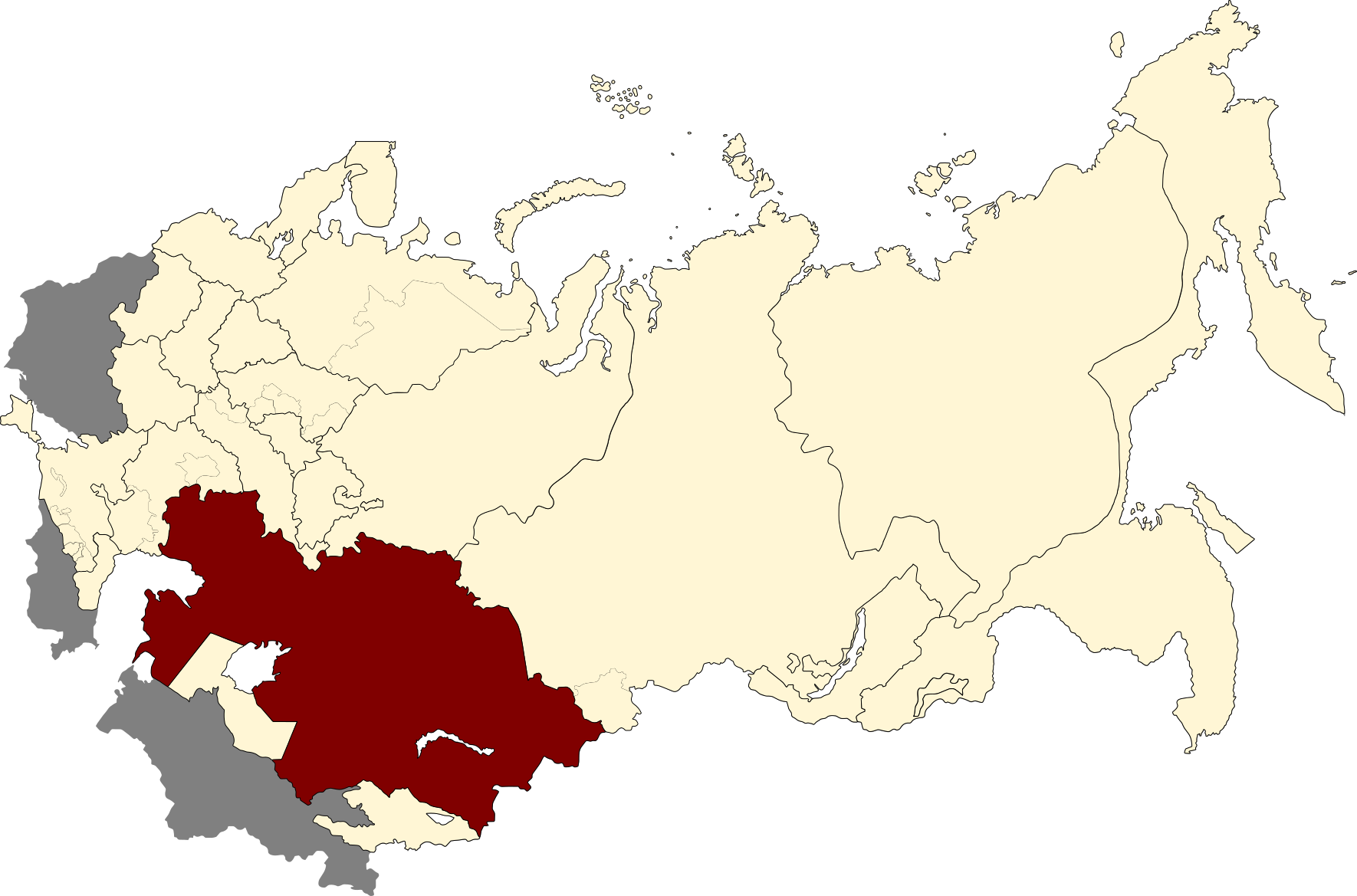
- Capital: Orenburg (1920–1925); Kyzylorda (1925–1929); Alma–Ata (1929–1936)
- Government
  - Type: Unitary Soviet Republic
- History
  - Established: 1920
  - Disestablished: 1936
Preceded by	Succeeded by
Alash Autonomy	Kazakh Soviet Socialist Republic
- Today part of: Kazakhstan; Russia; Turkmenistan; Uzbekistan

The Kazakh Autonomous Socialist Soviet Republic (Russian: Казахская Автономная Социалистическая Советская Республика; Kazakh: Қазақ Автономиялы Социалистік Кеңестік Республикасы, romanized: Qazaq Avtonomiialy Sotsialistık Keñestık Respublikasy (Note: The Kazakh alphabet has changed several times in the past century and the rendering of the republic's name changed as well: 1925–1939: قازاقستان آفتونومیالی آلەۋمەتچل كەڭەس رەسپۋبلیكاسی (Arabic script); 1929–1936: Qazaƣьstan Aʙtonomьjalь Satsьjaldьq Keꞑester Respɵʙlijkesi (1929 Latin script))), abbreviated as Kazakh ASSR (Russian: Казакская АССР; Kazakh: Qazaq ASSR) and simply Kazakhstan (Russian: Казахстан; Kazakh: Qazaƣьstan), was an autonomous republic of the Russian Soviet Federative Socialist Republic (RSFSR) within the Soviet Union (from 1922) which existed from 1920 until 1936.

== History ==
The Kazakh ASSR was originally created as the Kirghiz Autonomous Socialist Soviet Republic (Russian: Киргизская Автономная Социалистическая Советская Республика; Kazakh: Қырғыз Автономиялық Социалистік Кеңес Республикасы, romanized: Qyrğyz Avtonomiialyq Sotsialistık Keñes Respublikasy) (not to be confused with the Kirghiz ASSR of 1926–1936, a Central Asian territory which is now the independent state of Kyrgyzstan) on 26 August 1920, and was an autonomous republic within the Russian Socialist Federative Soviet Republic.

Before the Russian Revolution, Kazakhs in Russia were known as 'Kirghiz-Kazaks' or simply 'Kirghiz' (and the Kyrgyz as 'Kara-Kirghiz'). This practice continued into the early Soviet period, and thus the Kirghiz ASSR was a national republic for Kazakhs. However, on 15–19 June 1925, the Fifth Kazakh Council of Soviets decided to rename the republic the Kazak Autonomous Socialist Soviet Republic. The capital of the former Kirghiz ASSR, Ak-Mechet, was retained as the seat of the Kazak ASSR but was renamed Kzyl-Orda, from the Kazakh 'red centre'. In 1927 or 1929 (Note: Sources differ on the year.) the city of Alma-Ata was designated as the new capital of the ASSR. In February 1930, there was an anti-Soviet insurgency in the village of Sozak. On 5 December 1936, the ASSR was detached from the RSFSR and made the Kazakh Soviet Socialist Republic, a full union republic of the Soviet Union.

== Geography ==
The Kazak ASSR, which succeeded the recently expanded Kirghiz ASSR, included all of the territory making up the present-day Republic of Kazakhstan, plus parts of Uzbekistan (the Karakalpak Autonomous Oblast), Turkmenistan (the north shore of Kara-Bogaz-Gol), and Russia (parts of what would become Orenburg Oblast). These territories were transferred from the Kazak ASSR over the following decade.

The administrative subdivisions of the ASSR changed several times during its history. In 1928, the guberniyas—administrative districts inherited from the Kirghiz ASSR—were eliminated and replaced with 13 okrugs and raions. In 1932, the republic was divided into six new larger oblasts. These included:

- Aktyubinsk Oblast (capital: Aktyubinsk)
- Alma-Ata Oblast (capital: Alma-Ata)
- East Kazak Oblast (capital: Semipalatinsk)
- Karaganda Oblast (capital: Petropavlovsk)
- South Kazak Oblast (capital: Chimkent)
- West Kazak Oblast (capital: Uralsk).

On 31 January 1935, yet another territorial division was implemented, which included the six oblasts listed above, plus a new Karkaralinsk okrug.
