= Battle of Chupan-Ata =

- Part of the Russian conquest of Bukhara
- Heights of Chupan-Ata on the outskirts of Samarkand. On 1 May 1868 the Russian army stormed this hill. This photo was taken by Mikhail Terentyev between 1871 and 1872. Caption under photo: Heights of Chupan-Ata famous for victory over the regular army of Bukharan Emir 1 May 1868.
Date	1 May 1868
Location	Heights of Chupan-Ata on the outskirts of Samarkand, modern day Uzbekistan
Result	Russian victory Emir Muzaffar retreats
Territorial changes	Russia captures Samarkand

Belligerents
Russian Empire	Emirate of Bukhara

Commanders and leaders
Konstantin Kaufmann; Alexander Konstantinovich Abramov; Nikolai Golovachev; Baron of Stempel; Nikolai Nazarov	Emir Muzaffar

Strength
Total: 3,500; 21 companies of infantry 16 artillery pieces 500 Cossacks	Exact number unknown Estimated to be several thousands 32 artillery pieces

Casualties and losses
2 killed 38 wounded	Several dozens 21 artillery pieces

Battle of Chupan-Ata was a military engagement between the Russian Empire and the Emirate of Bukhara that took place during the Russian conquest of Central Asia on 1 May 1868.

After failed negotiations, and repeated raids from the Emirate, the Russian army commenced a new campaign in spring of 1868 to decisively defeat the Emir.

The Russian Army, led by Konstantin Kaufmann and Alexander Abramov, marched from Yan-Kurgan towards Samarkand. The Russian army arrived sooner than the Emir could fortify his positions and after a quick shock attack the Emir was forced off the heights.

The battle allowed the Russian army to capture Samarkand and integrate it into the Russian Empire. It was the first significant engagement of the 1868 campaign against Bukhara.

Following the capture of Samarkand, the Russian army would win more battles against the Emirate including the Battle of Zerabulak and the Defence of Samarkand. The 1868 campaign decisively defeated Emir Muzaffar causing the Emirate of Bukhara to become a dependent protectorate of the Russian Empire.

== Background ==
=== Previous campaigns and battles ===
In the 1860s, the Russian army won several victories including:

- Battle of Ican 1864
- Siege of Tashkent 1865
- Siege of Khujand 1866
- Battle of Irjar 1866

After a series of defeats, the Emir made peace with Russia; however, treaty negotiations were slow and the ceasefire terms were not honoured.

=== State of the Russian army ===
By the spring of 1868, the Russian army in the Syr-Darya region consisted of:

- 11 infantry battalions
- Four batteries of field artillery - with 32 guns
- 2100 Cossacks from Orenburg and Ural
- One company of sappers
- Two companies of fortress artillery with 177 guns.

However, there was a shortage of troops and the Russian numbers were insufficient in the region. The primary reason for this shortage was the high incidence of illness and disease among the troops. The year 1867 was particularly difficult in this regard. Reinforcements dispatched from the Orenburg Line in early spring to replenish the region's forces suffered greatly due to the harsh hot climate and inexperience of the commanders.

Fever spread rapidly among the troops, who were exhausted by the labor of constructing quarters, guard duty, and marches. Overcrowded quarters and the lack of clean water combined with physical exhaustion contributed to the rising number of sick soldiers. The region had a shortage of infirmary space, medicines, doctors, and medical assistants. Moreover, the winters of 1867 and 1868 were exceptionally rainy, which increased the spread of disease. During these months, over 12,000 men were admitted to the infirmaries, and 820 died - the average monthly death toll was nearly 130. Sickness was most prevalent among the infantry stationed on the front line near Jizzakh.

The natives reported to the Emir that the Russian army was weakened and he saw that moment as an opportunity.

=== Bukharan army ===
By the spring of 1868, the Bukharan army consisted of 12 000 to 13 000 infantry, 1500 artilerists with 150 artillery pieces, and 2000 to 3000 cavalrymen. A small part of army was equipped with old flintlock and matchlock guns. Most of the army was equipped with melee weapons including batiks, spears, and sabers. The Emirate had a conscription system which formed and replenished the regular army. In wartime, the Emir's forces grew considerabley through the addition of militia from cities and tribes. However, the number of militia depended on the popularity of the war. In appearance, the militiamen differed in no way from the rest of the peaceful population in the region.

=== Peace talks fail & Preparation for the campaign ===
By April 9, the Emir still had not sent the ratification of the treaty. Menawhile, he was covertly gathering his troops near Samarkand.

By April 1868, in the area closest to Bukhara, the Russian army had:

- 2000 men at Yan-Kurgan
- 800 men at Ura-Tyube
- 1500 men at Khujand
- 2000 men at Tashkent

Total - 6300 men

Those numbers were enough to protect each of the strongholds, but it was insufficient for systematic defensive warfare. On April 14, the Russian commanders started to gather troops in Jizzakh by calling for soldiers from other surrounding cities. Additionally, soldiers and officers who were on leave were recalled to service. New reinforcements were requested to be dispatched from the Orenburg Line.

On the night of April 14–15, two hours before dawn, a large band of Bukharan men, attacked the Russian camp near Jizzakh. The Russian troops, alerted by an alarm, quickly rose and repulsed the attack with rifle and artillery fire.

By April 27, the following forces were gathered in Jizzakh:

- 16 companies of infantry
- 6 artillery pieces
- 600 Cossacks
- Half a company of engineers
- One platoon of a light battery
- One company of Afghan volunteers

The army had an adequate stocks of ammunition and supplies. The army hired a huge number of local arba carriages to transport supplies and artillery. The Russians could not secure a mobile field hospital due to a lack of hospital supplies and because the Russian army relied on local resources during their campaigns.

Throughout the night of the 26th-27th, there was extremely heavy rain, and toward dawn such a violent hurricane arose that many of the officers' tents were blown away. However, by seven o'clock the rain stopped and at eight o'clock the Russian army marched out of Jizzakh.

=== March towards Samarkand ===
The rain turned the road into a quagmire, which slowed down the Russian transport. The Russians crossed mountains and flooded rivers, which further slowed their march. Halfway along the route, the advance halted at the place known as Timur's Gates and at four o'clock the entire army arrived at Yan-Kurgan. April 28 and 29 were spent on site as final preparations were made for the campaign. Soldiers who fell ill during the march were transported to Jizzakh. Meanwhile, envoys from Samarkand, and the commanders of the Bukharan troops, were constantly sending letters to Kaufmann, which requested that he does not begin the campaign and instead wait a little longer until the Emir sent the treaty terms. According to Terentyev, those letters were sent in attempt to buy time.

On April 30, at four o'clock in the morning the Russian army marched to Samarkand.

The Russian army that marched to Samarkand consisted of the following:

- 21 companies of infantry
- 16 artillery pieces
- 500 Cossacks

Total - 3500 men

A rearguard was left at Yan-Kurgan to protect communications with Jizzakh.

A map showing the route marched by the Russian army during the 1868 campaign. Centre depicts Samarkand. Northeast road, leading to Tashkent, depicts Yan-Kurgan and Jizzakh. Northwest road, leading to Bukhara, depicts the village of Zerabulak.

Bukharan envoys tried to stall the Russian advance while also performing reconnaissance for the Emir. The heat grew increasingly and the Russian army quickly ran out of water. Some soldiers were so thirsty that discipline collapsed and they resorted to drinking water from dirty puddles. At five o'clock in the evening the detachment arrived at the locality of Tash-Kupryuk (“Stone Bridge”).

== Battle ==
=== Russian army arrives at Chupan-Ata ===
On the morning of May 1, the Russian army continued marching towards Samarkand. They encountered more Bukharan envoys and abandoned villages along the road. Some Russian soldiers fell ill due to drinking water from dirty puddles. The Russian vanguard encountered a small detachment of Bukharan soldiers. After a failure in negotiation, the first shots were fired. Two hundred Cossacks arrived to aid the vanguard, causing the Bukharans to retreat. Soon, the Russian army arrived to the Zarafshon river.

The Emir had a plan to construct a dam on the Zarafshon river in order to flood the fields at the foot of Chupan-Ata. By doing so, he hoped to bog down the Russian advance and to get an advantage in the battle. However, the Russian army arrived before the dam was built. The Russian vanguard, forced through the orchards and drove any Bukharan soldiers across the river. Four hundred Cossack, along with four light artillery pieces and one rocket launcher, engaged the Bukharan cavalry, which was forced onto the left bank of the river. The Bukharan artillery was ineffective in providing support for the cavalry. The Russian vanguard halted between the channels of the river, at a distance of one and a half verst the heights occupied by the Bukharans.

=== Bukharan positions ===
Chupan-Ata was located near the stony bed of the Zarafshon, which was divided into numerous deep and swift channels. The Chupan-Ata heights towered above in a high, sheer precipice against the left bank of the Zarafshon. The heights had a chapel located on its summit. Bukharan infantry occupied both the summit and the foot of the heights while the cavalry was spread unevenly in the area. All three roads leading to Samarkand were guarded by Bukharan artillery. One battery of 20 artillery pieces was positioned in the centre. Six more cannons were positioned to the left and fired upon the crossing of the Zarafshon along the road that skirted the heights on the northern side. Another six cannons were positioned on the right to fire upon the third road, which ran south of the first two. While waiting for the main army to arrive, the Russian vanguard sent an ultimatum to the Bukharans. The ultimatum demanded that the Bukharans withdraw from the heights within two hours if they wanted to continue negotiations. After two hours, there was no response and the main Russian army arrived. The infantry formed in battle order while the transport train was built into a wagon fort. After 45 minutes, the Bukharan army opened fire with cannons and rifles. The smoke revealed the position of all Bukharan batteries. Kaufmann spent 15 minutes making observations, then he ordered the infantry to attack.

=== Storming Chupan-Ata ===
==== Russian battle order ====
The Russian centre line consisted of six companies of the 5th and 9th Turkestan Line Battalions. The infantry was supported by eight field guns, four on each flank. The reserve of the right flank consisted of three companies of the 8th Battalion, two companies of riflemen, and one company of Afghan volunteers. The reserve of the left flank consisted of three companies of the 4th Battalion and half a company of engineers. Four hundred Cossacks, with four guns and a rocket battery, served as the general reserve. The Russian wagon fort was guarded by four companies of the 6th Battalion, four cannons, and fifty Cossacks. The Russian centre was commanded by General Golovachev, who personally led the troops toward the heights. He was ordered to attack two points of the enemy position - the right flank and the center. The Russian troops on the left flank, under the command of Colonel Abramov, moved against the right flank of the Bukharan position. The heights of Chupan-Ata had few places suitable for an assault. The Russian army did not know the location of all river fords. Moreover, the left flank of the Bukharan position was impregnable because of the steepness of the cliffs.

==== Russian attack ====
Battle map depicting the battle of Chupan-Ata. Dotted line depicts the movement of the Russian army. Heights of Chupan-Ata are depicted in the middle left part of the map. Bukharan right flank is charged by Abramov, left flank by Baranov, and centre by Nazarov.

The Russian infantry marched chest-deep through the channels of the Zarafshon and then knee-deep through the mud of the marshy rice fields. All while being under the fire from Bukharan rifles and artillery. Thankfully, the Bukharan firepower was outdated compared to the Russian guns and rifles. After forcing through the river and the rice field, Russian infantry began scaling Chupan-Ata with fixed bayonets. The companies of the 9th Turkestan Battalion, under the command of Lieutenant colonel Nazarov, attacked the Bukharan artillery in the center, while the companies of the 3rd and Rifle Battalions, under the command of Lieutenant colonel Baranov, rushed against the left flank of the Bukharan position.

Russian artillery took almost no part in the action, since the crossing the river proved difficult. The Russian cavalry likewise did not engage due to the inexperience of its commander. The Cossacks horsemen aided the infantry during the crossing, but they too did not engage in the action.

The shock attack worked. The Bukharans did not wait for close quarter combat. As soon as the Russian infantry approached within a hundred paces, the Bukharans abandoned their positions, leaving behind 21 guns. Some Bukharans retreated while throwing behind their weapons and clothing. While the Russian infantry stormed Chupan-Ata, the Bukharan cavalry tried to attack the Russian wagon fort several times, but each time the Russian fire forced them to withdraw. The Russian army did not pursue the retreating Bukharans due to extreme exhaustion of the troops, who were exhausted by the long march before the battle. By six o'clock, the Russian colors were placed on top of the hill's chapel. The entire engagement never became intense and the Bukharans suffered minimal casualties. The Russians lost 2 men killed, and a total of 38 men wounded.

== Aftermath ==
=== Russian army captures Samarkand ===
The Russian infantry spent the night on top of Chupan-Ata with no shelter or food - the supplies were left in the wagon fort on the other side of the Zarafshon river. The Russian wagons could not cross the river until the next morning. Russian soldiers slept with wet clothes during the cool night.

Kaufmann was convinced that the Emir retreated into Samarkand, so he made plans to storm the city. However, at dawn on May 2, envoys from Samarkand approached Kaufmann with an official capitulation. The city surrendered without a fight, which allowed it to surrender on favourable terms. Apparently, the city refused to provide Emir Muzaffar refuge after his defeat at Chupan-Ata, causing him to flee towards Bukhara. The same day, the Russian army entered Samarkand and the city became a part of the Russian Empire.

The Russian army established its headquarters in the city's citadel. In the citadel the Russian army captured:

- 3,747 cannonballs
- 533 grenades and bombs
- 218 cannon charges
- 101 poods of gunpowder - about 1654 kg
- 30,768 rifle cartridges

The Russian army marched 75 kilometres in two days. The forced march combined with the excessive exhaustion and exposure had produced widespread illness in the Russian army. Starting from May 3, an average of 50 men fell ill each day. The Russian army took measures to establish a hospital in the citadel. The exhausted state of the Russian army prevented them from immediately repairing and fortifying the citadel.

=== Campaign against Emir Muzaffar continues ===
The capture of Samarkand became a key moment in the 1868 campaign. Samarkand was one of the biggest and most religiously significant cities in the region. Samarkand also controlled the flow of the Emirates water resources.

Russian success in capturing Samarkand is attributed to the fast march and shock tactics. The Russian army arrived sooner than the Emir could mobilize his army or prepare the battlefield to his advantage.

Despite capturing Samarkand, the Emir and his army remained intact. Kaufmann would spend the entirety of May trying to locate and defeat Emir's main army. In June, Kaufmann would defeat Emir Muzaffar at Zerabulak while the Emirate's armies unsuccessfully tried to retake Samarkand.

== Gallery ==
Russian soldiers with awards for the Battle of Chupan-Ata.

Participants of the battle with their awards. Photos collected by Mikhail Terentyev between 1871-1872.

More photos of participants from the same album.

Participants of the battle. Photo retrieved from Terentyev's Turkestan album.

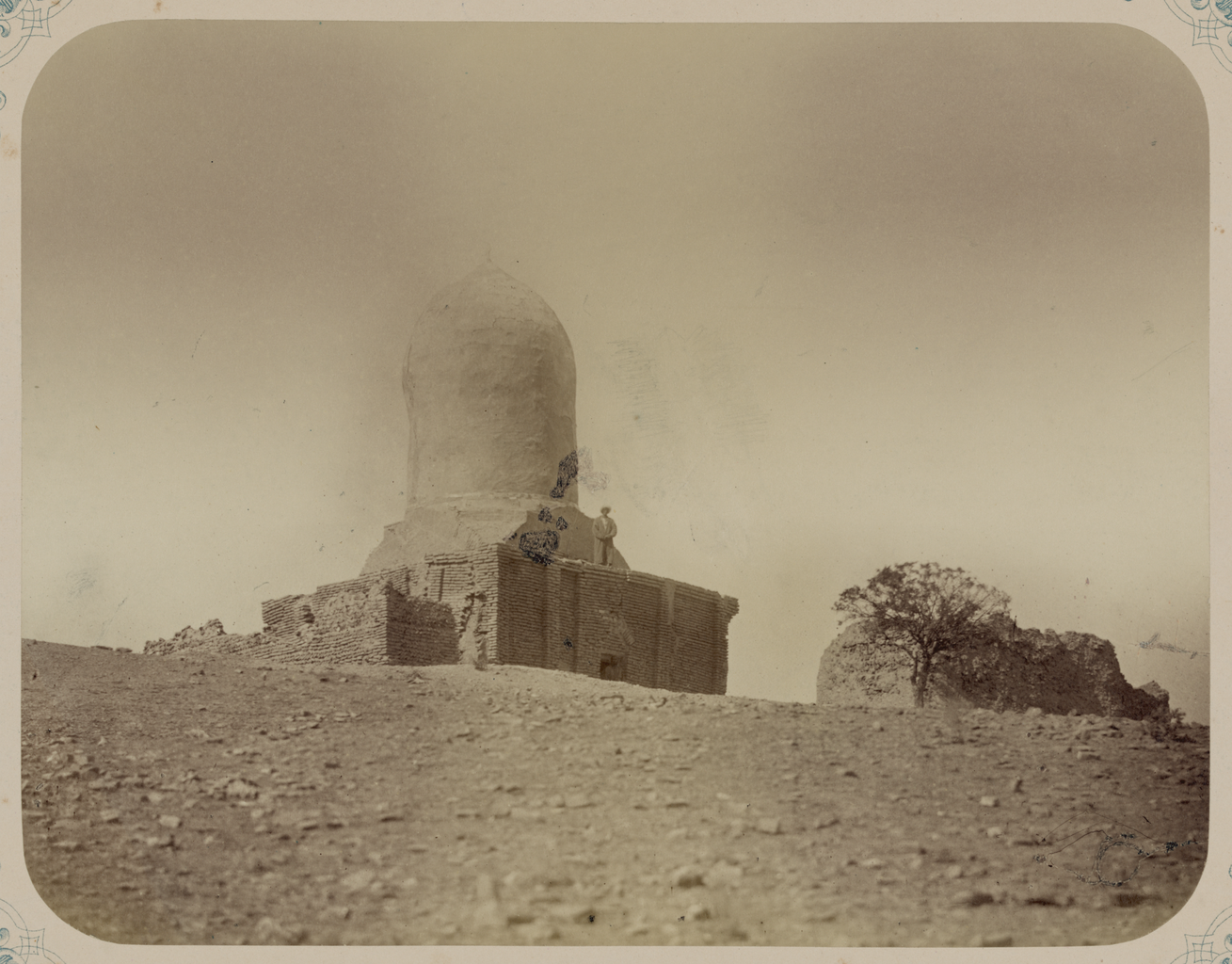
The chapel on top of Chupan-Ata

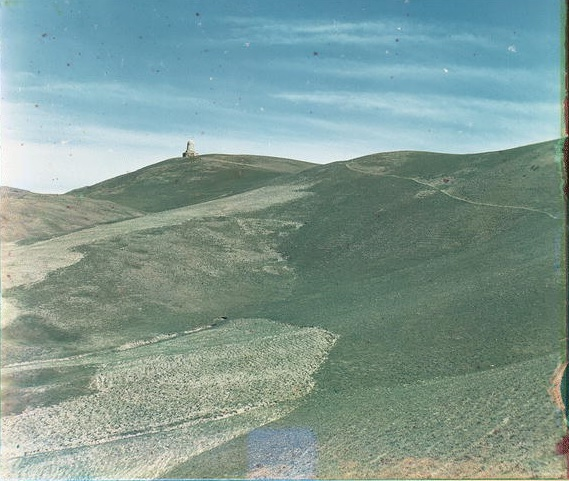
The heights of Chupan-Ata on the outskirts of Samarkand. This coloured photo was taken by Sergey Prokudin-Gorsky in the early 20th century.
