= Siege of Samarkand (1868) =

Part of the Russian conquest of Bukhara

- Part of the Russian conquest of Bukhara
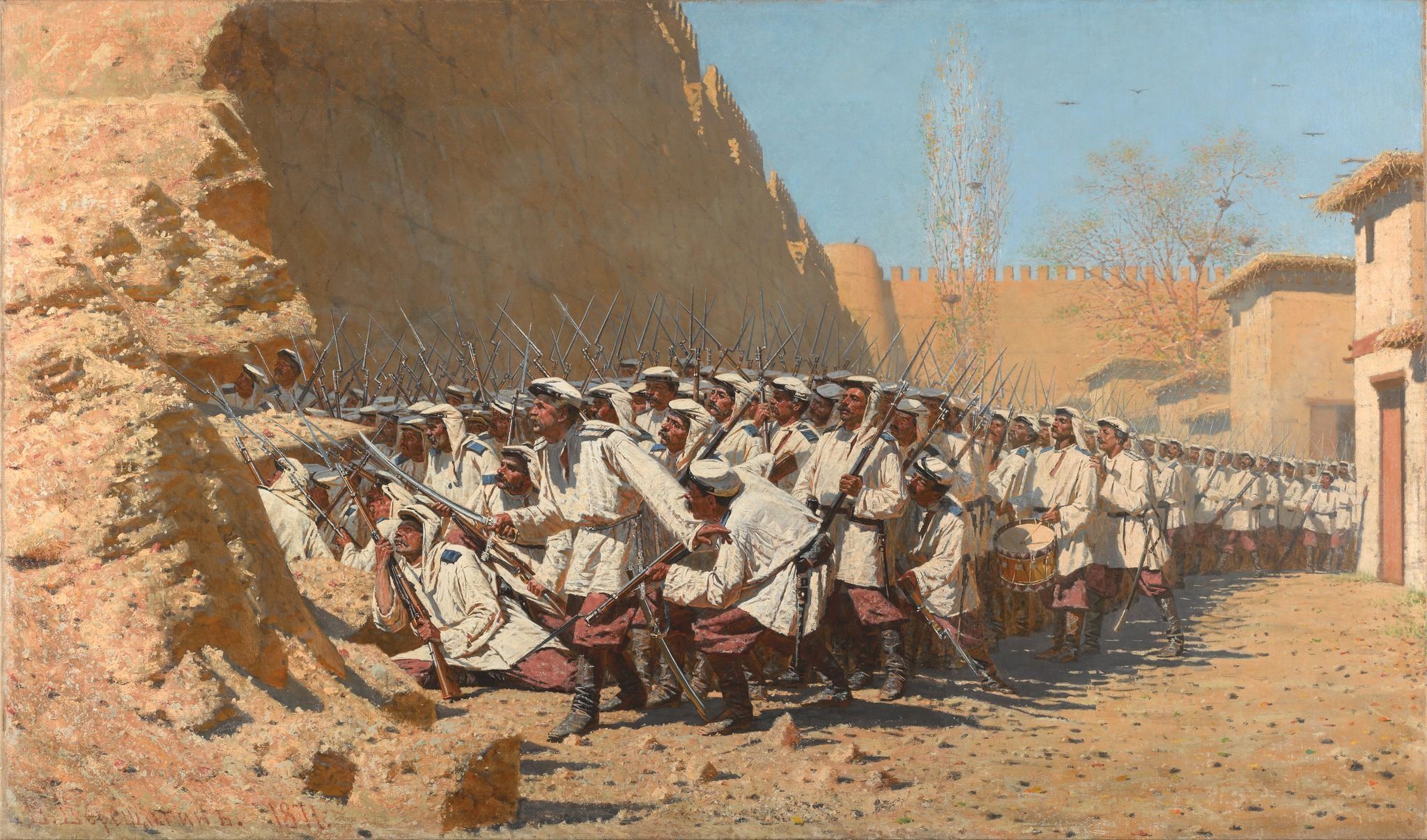
- Painting, titled "Let them enter!", of Russian soldiers defending a breach in the walls at the Siege of Samarkand. Vasily Vereshchagin—who was commended for his heroism during the siege—painted the work in 1871 and went on to become a famous War artist.
Date	14–20 June 1868
Location	Samarkand, Uzbekistan (then Russia)
Result	Russian victory

Belligerents
Russian Empire	Emirate of Bukhara (Khanate of Kokand) Kokand Khanate; Uzbek tribes Turkmen tribes

Commanders and leaders
Baron of Stempel; Nikolai Nazarov	Jurabek

Strength
650–660; 2 cannons 2 mortars 4 Bukharan cannons	25,000–65,000

Casualties and losses
49 killed 172 wounded	Heavy

The siege of Samarkand, or siege of the Samarkand Citadel, was a military engagement fought in the city of Samarkand (in modern-day Uzbekistan) in June 1868. In the engagement, a small garrison of Russian Imperial soldiers was besieged by a combined army of Bukharan soldiers and their allies - including the Kokand Khanate and tributary Turkmen-Uzbek tribes. The siege played an important role in the 1868 campaign of Russian conquest of Bukhara.

The Russian army commanded by Konstantin Kaufmann took Samarkand on May 2, 1868, after a brief battle on the heights of Chupan-Ata - a height on the outskirts of the city. The city itself surrendered without a fight.

The Russian army made the city's citadel as their headquarters while the campaign against the Emir of Bukhara was ongoing. In late May, as Kaufmann left the city to fight against the Emir, he left a small garrison consisting of infantry and sappers to repair the citadel and to guard the city.

While the main Russian army was away from the city, the small garrison would be unexpectedly besieged by a large army of combined tribes. In addition to the great besieging army, the city's inhabitants rose up against the Russians.

Instead of defending the entire city, the outnumbered Russian garrison resorted to defending in the citadel.

Over the course of six days, the Russian garrison repelled multiple attempts by the besieging allied army to storm the citadel. In some instances, the garrison was close to being annihilated. Despite suffering heavy casualties, the garrison held out until the main army returned to lift the siege.

The successful defence of the citadel had effectively prevented Bukhara from retaking the city of Samarkand.

The successful defence of the city, combined with the Russian victory at Zerabulak, had effectively defeated the armies of the Emir. The Emir no longer had any means to fight the Russian army and sued for peace.

As a result of the 1868 campaign, the Emirate of Bukhara became a dependent protectorate of the Russian Empire.

The Russian victory solidified imperial control over the new state of Russian Turkestan, and caused the partial collapse of the Bukharan Emirate.

== Background ==
=== Russia's interest in Central Asia and early campaigns ===
Some Russian attempts to establish a connection with the region date as far as the 16th century. However, those attempts would not provide much gain due to the large distance between the two regions and due to the poor logistics of the time.

When Peter the Great became Tsar, he fought a series of wars in order to expand Russia's territories and to establish the Russian Empire and organized the first Russian military expedition into Central Asia. He believed that expanding into Central Asia would open a path towards India.

But a Russian expeditionary army was annihilated in the Khivan disaster. Thus, the Russian Empire lost interest to the region. The Russian Empire would not undertake campaigns against Central Asia for the next one hundred years.

=== Russia's 19th century campaigns ===
After the end of the Napoleonic Wars, the Russian Empire engaged against the British Empire in a rivavlry known as the Great Game. In that rivalvry, both empires attempted to establish and to secure territories in Central Asia and South Asia. Both of those regions had economic and strategic importance for the two empires.

The Russian Empire made its first major conquests in the first half of the 19th century.

The early conquests included:

- Kenesary's Rebellion 1837-1847
- Khivan campaign of 1839–1840
- Uprising of Eset Batyr 1847-1858
- Siege of Ak-Mechet 1853

Following Russia's defeat in the Crimean War, the Russian Empire adopted a new foreign policy. During the reign of Alexander II, the Russian Empire launched several campaigns into Central Asia. Those campaigns helped Russia to conquer a lot of territory and to consolidate its control in the region.

The events that took place before 1868 include the following:

- Battle of Ican 1864
- Siege of Tashkent 1865
- Siege of Khujand 1866
- Battle of Irjar 1866

In the mid-19th century, Russian military campaigns in Central Asia strove to suppress Muslim nations and to expand the Russian Empire.

Russia defeated the Kokand Khanate and Bukhara and by 1867 both Kokand and Bukhara ceded territory to the Russian Empire; these ceded territories were then incorporated into the Russian province of Turkestan, which was put under the governance of General Konstantin von Kaufmann.

Despite the end of the Russo-Bukharan War and the signing of a peace treaty, fighting continued in parts of the new Russian province. Seeking to crush these forces, Kaufmann organized an army and marched on the Bukharan-controlled city of Samarkand, which he captured in 1868. However, the capture of the city did not cause the end of the fighting, and so Kaufmann chose to pursue a force of retreating Bukharans to the city of Bukhara, leaving a small garrison of 685 men to hold Samarkand. This garrison force was not entirely combat-ready, and many of the men Kaufmann left behind were either wounded or non-combatants.

=== Russian army captures Samarkand ===
After the Russian victory over the Bukharan army at the Battle of Irjar in 1866, Kaufmann proposed peace to Emir Muzaffar. The peace terms required the Emir to approve a new draft of borders that had been changed in Russia's favour. The refusal of the Bukharan side to surrender in spring of 1868 led to the resumption of military actions. Therefore, starting the 1868 campaign.

Kaufmann assembled an army of approximately four thousand soldiers. His army included infantry, sappers, artillerists, and cossack detachments. The army was also accompanied by several Russian merchants and by a twenty-five year old Vasily Vereshchagin - who held the rank of a State Councillor. In late spring, Kaufmann commenced the Zarafshon campaign. The Zarafshon river, in the Zarafshon valley, was a strategically important river because it was the region's main source of water.

When the campaign commenced, Kaufmann decided to capture Samarkand for several reasons. Not only was Samarkand the emirate's largest city, it was also on the upper part of the Zarafshon river. By capturing Samarkand, the Russian army would have a foothold of the region's water resources.

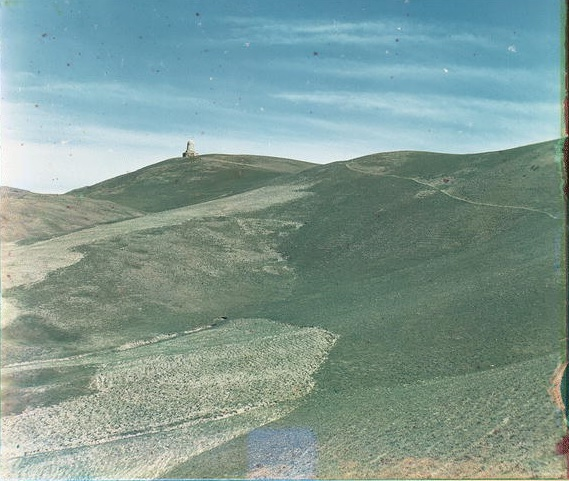
The heights of Chupan-Ata on the outskirts of Samarkand. On May 1, 1868, the Russian army stormed these hills. This coloured photo was taken by Sergey Prokudin-Gorsky in the early 20th century.

As the Russian army marched towards Samarkand, the Emir prepared for a pitched battle by holding defensive positions at the heights of Chupan-Ata. Chupan-Ata are a set of hills on the northeastern outskirts of Samarkand.

The Battle of Chupan-Ata took place on May 1, 1868. The Russian army attacked the hills from the northeast side. The Russian infantry crossed the river at the foot of the hills and climbed up the Chupan-Ata heights. The Emir's army was forced to retreat.

On May 2, 1868, envoys from Samarkand approached Kaufmann with an official capitulation. The city surrendered without a fight. The same day, the Russian army entered Samarkand and the city became a part of the Russian Empire.

=== Prelude to the siege ===
Because Samarkand capitulated without resisting, the city was able to surrender on favourable terms. The city's inhabitants and their property were left untouched. The city's population was allowed to attend mass gatherings, to visit mosques, and to continue their daily lives without serious intervention. In return, the city was to recognize the Russian Tsar as their new ruler, to engage in friendly relationships with the Russian army, and to allow Russian merchants to trade in the city's marketplace.

Kaufmann selected the city's citadel to serve as the army's headquarters and base of operations. The citadel was in a neglected state and poorly prepared in case of combat. Many places of the citadel required repairs and maintenance including the citadel's wall, buildings, wells, ponds, and aryks. Kaufmann, and other Russian commanders, received a proposal from military engineers to prepare the citadel for battle. The proposed plan required the demolition of all buildings adjoined to the citadel's wall - an act that would demolish part of the city. That proposal was rejected and citadel's preparation for combat was never prioritised. The citadel's repair jobs would start only after Kaufmann left the city with the main army.

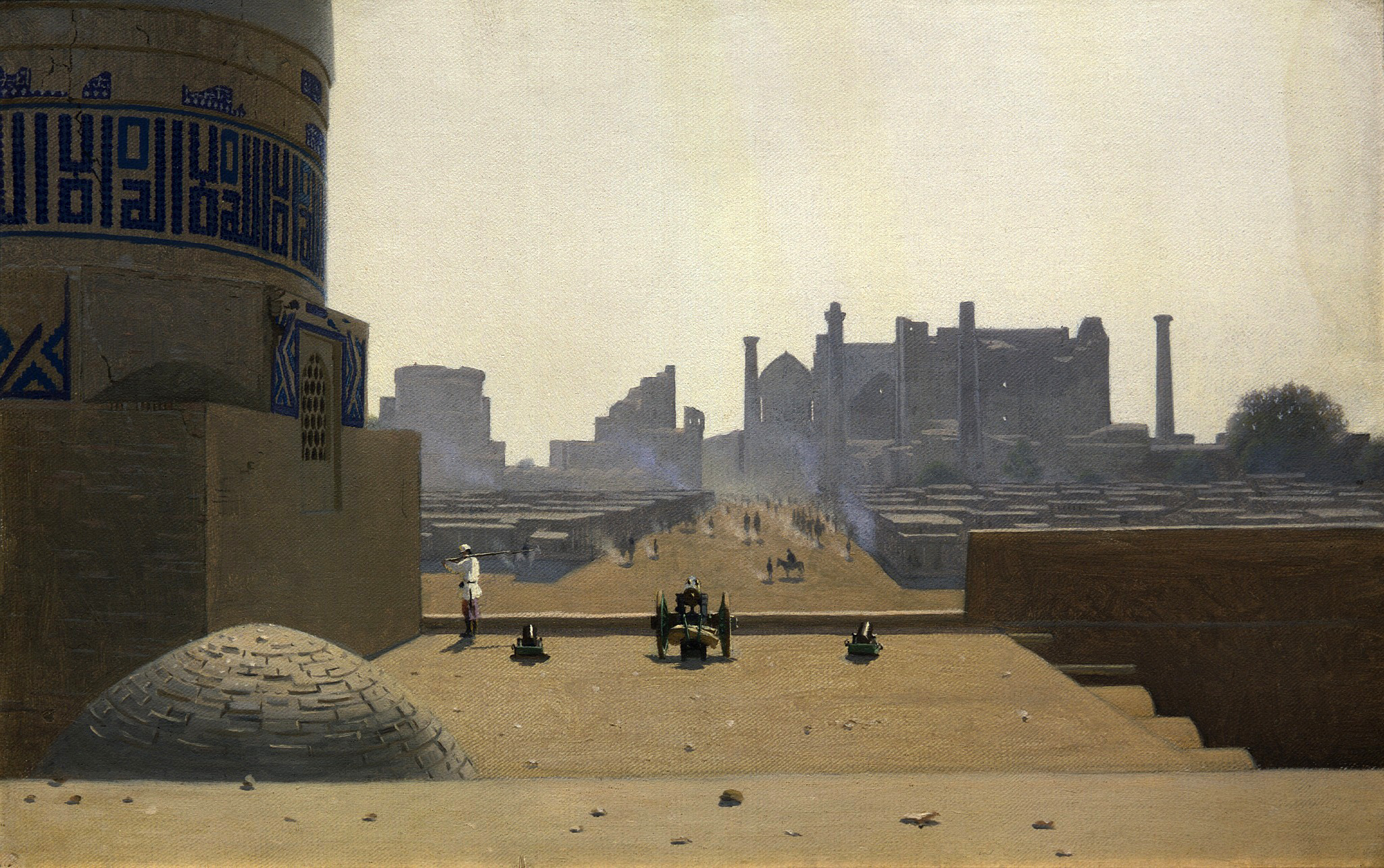
"Main Street in Samarkand, from the height of the citadel in the early morning." A painting by Vasily Veresschagin - a participant of the siege. This painting depicts the approximate setting of the citadel in the city of Samarkand.

Kaufmann, and other Russian commanders believed that there was nothing that could threaten their presence in the city. They also believed in the obedience of the city's inhabitants. Therefore, they never considered an uprising in the city as a possible scenario.

The Russian army would spend the entirety of May marching towards different cities and fortresses in an attempt to find and to decisively defeat the remainder of the Emir's army. None of those attempts brought the desired outcome and it left many Russian soldiers and officers frustrated. On May 30, 1868, Kaufmann marched out of Samarkand with the bulk of the Russian army, seeking to defeat the Emir in an open battle.

Only a small garrison was remained in Samarkand. That garrison included four companies of infantry, one company of sappers, a small cossack detachment, and a small artillerist platoon with two cannons and two mortars. All sick and wounded soldiers were also left behind in Samarkand. Several Russian merchants remained in the city and Vasily Vereshchagin too decided to remain in the city. 650—660 soldiers remained stationed in the citadel. The small garrison was under the command of Major Friedrich Karlovich Stempel. That garrison was left behind to guard the city, to maintain order, and to start repairing the citadel.

The departure of the main body of Kaufmann's army left Samarkand vulnerable. Seizing upon this weakness, nearby holdouts of Kokandi, Bukharan soldiers, and anti-Russian tribes consolidated their forces and marched on the lightly defended city. Within days, crowds of tribes started gathering on the outskirts of the city. In addition to the exterior army, the city's citizenry also displayed hostility towards the Russians. Crowds of residents gathered in the marketplace, much to the garrison's suspicion, and hurled stones at the Russians. Additionally, the city's residents started lying to the Russians and some residents were fleeing the city - a preliminary sign of incoming danger.

The citadel was atop a hillock and the heights of Chupan-Ata were visible from the citadel. Commandant Stempel, and other Russian officers, observed masses of tribesmen assembling atop of Chupan-Ata. The garrison would hastily try to finish the citadel's fortification.

== Siege ==
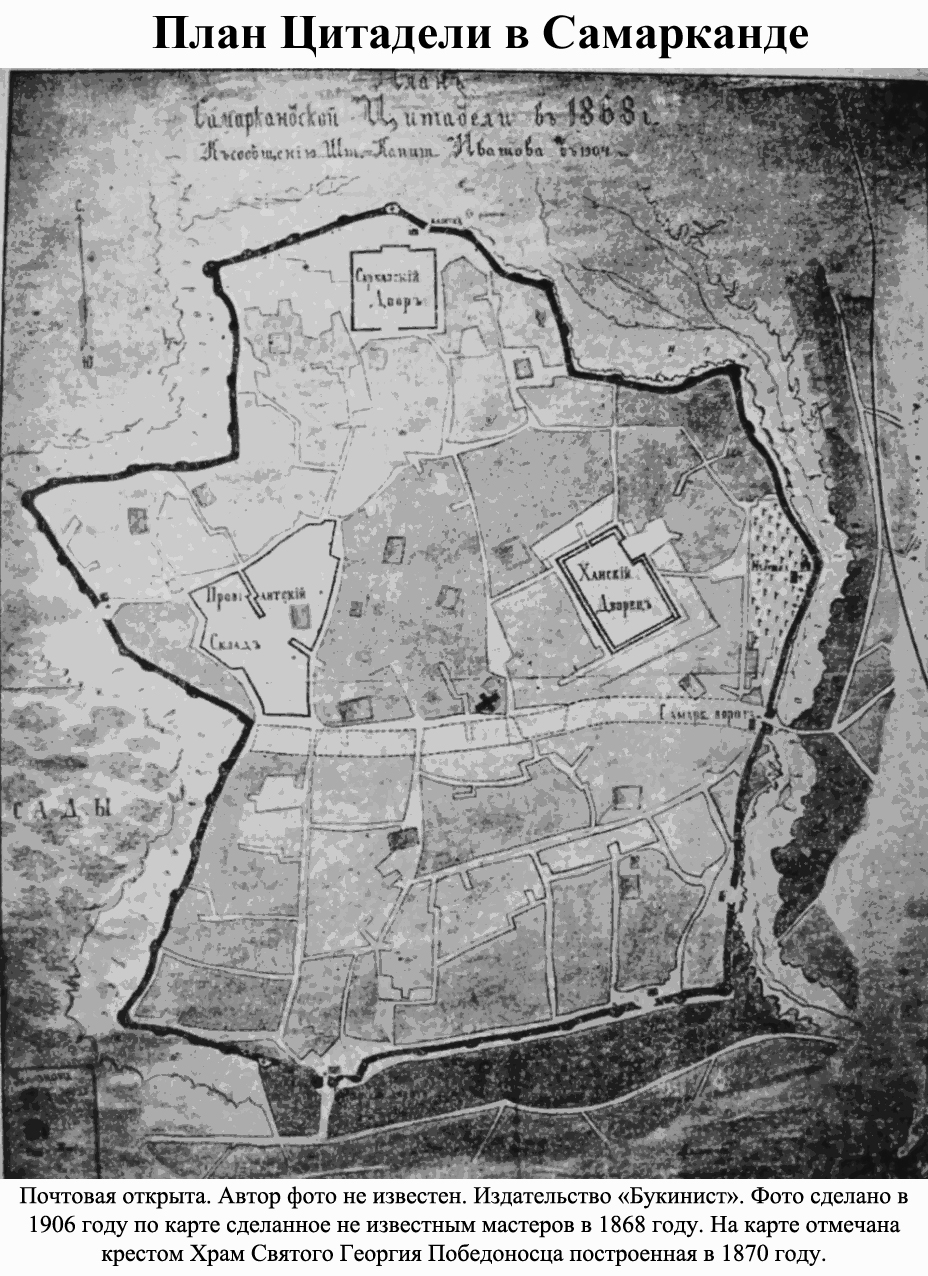
A sketch of the Citadel of Samarkand - 1868. This is the citadel where the Russian garrison was defending during the siege. The citadel's west side faces the city's orchards. The south, east, and north sides are open to the city. There were three gates in the citadel. One smaller wicket gate was in the citadel's north side. In the north side there was also a yard and a graveyard. The east side has the Khan's Palace and the Samarkand gate. The south side has the Bukhara gate - closer to the southwest corner. During the siege, all three gates were attacked. The most intense fighting took place in the Samarkand gate and the Bukhara gate.

=== The garrison besieged ===
On June 2 - June 14 Gregorian style - the same day the Battle of Zerabulak took place, Major Stempel received a request from the city's ambassadors to deal with the large crowds of tribesmen outside of Samarkand. Although suspicious of the ambassadors' intents, Stempel agreed to resolve the issue. In part, Stempel agreed to resolve the request because the garrison was obligated to protect the city.

With two companies of soldiers and one cannon, Stempel moved out to the outskirts of the city where he engaged in a brief skirmish with the besieging army. However, Stempel quickly realized that an uprising was starting in the city. Stempel (Russian: Shtempel), understood that the garrison was greatly outnumbered so he abandoned any attempts of defending the entire city. Instead, he quickly retreated into the citadel.

As Stempel retreated to the citadel, the besieging army invaded the city from every direction. At that moment, the small garrison was besieged by a 55,000-65,000-man army.

According to Terentyev, the besieging army consisted of the following:

- 25,000 Shahrisabzi tribesmen
- 15,000 of mixed tribes including Sarts and Kipchaks
- 15,000-25,000 citizens of Samarkand who rebelled against the Russians.

Total: 55,000-65,000.

As the siege progressed, the besieging army would suffer heavy casualties. Some tribes would later abandon the siege and retreat away from Samarkand. Therefore, the besieging army would become smaller as the siege progressed.

=== State of the citadel and Russian defence plan ===
The garrison did not have enough time to prepare the citadel for the upcoming siege. Few repairs and fortifications were complete before the siege started. Although the citadel was highly defensible, the lack of proper fortification contributed to the heavy casualties suffered by the Russian garrison.

The garrison had a supply of 200,000 rounds of ammunition, excluding soldiers' personal supplies. The garrison's supply of gunpowder amounted to 90 poods - about 1475 kg. There were also 95 rockets and 150 half-pood hand grenades.

The supply of provisions varied within different categories of food. There was enough flour and groat to feed the entire garrison for two months. There was a small supply of meat and salt that would be expended within the first days of the siege. The garrison lacked the necessary supply of fodder to feed their horses. The garrison also failed to secure or to prepare a supply of fresh water. When the siege started, the citadel's water supply was severed.

The Samarkand gate in the east side and the Bukhara gate in the south side were considered the citadel's weakest spots. Two companies of soldiers would be stationed at each of the two gates. Every single breach along the citadel's wall would be guarded by groups of 10-15 soldiers.

The garrison was supplemented by Jewish and Iranian residents, most of whom opposed the return of the Bukharan government and feared reprisal if the city was retaken. The allied army opposing the Russians was made up of Bukharans, Kokandi, several pro-Bukharan tribes, and many townspeople from Samarkand. Besides the 650 to 660 soldiers who were defending the citadel, the citadel also housed an additional 450 non-combatants who did not participate in the defence. Those included sick and wounded soldiers, and twenty detained prisoners.

==== Russian commanders ====
Commandant of the garrison Major Friedrich Karlovich Stempel would not be involved in any fighting himself. Instead, Stempel acted as the commander-in-chief for the entire garrison. He spend most of the siege monitoring the defence, receiving reports of enemy attacks, and strategically utilizing the small reserve by giving it commands to assist positions most in need.

The second key commander of the defense was lieutenant colonel Nikolai Nikolaevich Nazarov. Born in 1828, Nazarov was a seasoned veteran having previously participated in the Hungarian Revolution of 1848, the Crimean War, and the Caucasian War. Nazarov acted as the front line commander of the reserve and repeatedly participated in combat during the siege. His presence on the front line encouraged the Russian defenders. On an interesting note, Nazarov was more senior than Stempel both in rank and age. However, when the siege started Nazarov held no position officially. Apparently, Nazarov had a dispute with other Russian commanders, causing him to be relieved of duty and detained. When the main army left Samarkand, Nazarov reported being ill and remained in the city. When the threat of an attack seemed imminent, Nazarov was released from detention by Stempel.

=== Day one ===
==== Battle for the north side ====
As Stempel retreated to the citadel, a large army of Bukhara troops entered the city of Samarkand from every direction. One of the first attacks made by the besieging army is the attack on the north gate. The north side of the citadel had a yard and a graveyard. Almost immediately, the besieging tribesmen opened fire from their rifles and muskets. Although the tribesmen were armed with outdated muzzleloading firearms, their numerical superiority allowed them to unleash a superior amount of firepower. In addition to the numerical advantage, there were many buildings either adjoined to the citadel's wall or in close proximity to the citadel. Those buildings provided the tribesmen shooters with cover that allowed them to shoot at the citadel's defenders unpunished.

As the tribesmen shooters fired at the Russian positions at the north gate and the graveyard, masses of tribesmen armed with melee weapons performed a frontal assault on the Russian positions. It is likely that the attacking tribesmen were informed by the city's inhabitants about the citadel's weak points because prior to Russian fortification the north side of the citadel was the weakest spot. Prior to Russian fortification, the north side had a breached wall and a collapsed moat.

Vereshchagin visited the north side of the citadel prior to the siege. He recalled how the sappers worked slowly because none of them believed that the citadel would be attacked. However, they worked at a faster pace once the enemy was visible on Chupan-Ata.

The north side of the citadel was the only place where all planned fortifications were complete. The breached wall was repaired. The moat was repaired and widened. Two artillery barbettes were built. Approximately two platoons of soldiers were stationed at the graveyard and two more platoons were stationed near the yard and the wicket gate. The defenders had three cannons stationed in the north side including two of the captured Bukharan cannons and one Russian cannon.

As the tribesmen performed a frontal assault, the defending Russians opened fired with artillery canister and rifle fire. The Russian infantry was armed with the brand new Carle rifle - a breechloading needle rifle that was capable of firing up to ten rounds per minute.

The tribesmen were able to force through the barrage and to reach the citadel's wall. Some tribesmen tried to scale the Russian positions from the front while some tried outflank by climbing the walls using grappling hooks. Those who tried to climb the walls were quickly picked off by Russian infantry. The completed fortifications prevented the frontal assault from succeeding. The first assault was quickly repelled; however, the tribesmen quickly regrouped and launched a second, more effective, assault. The tribesmen scaled up the Russian positions as the shooters picked off Russian artillerists and infantry. The Russians were able to repel the second assault, albeit they suffered heavy casualties. Two officers were killed and about ten others were heavily wounded.

Seeing that the north side was better fortified than they anticipated, the tribesmen attacked less fortified sides of the citadel. Despite the majority of the attackers moving to attack the east and south sides of the citadel, some attackers continued to attack the north side as well. The attacks were easily repelled by the Russians who used mortars and hand grenades against the tribesmen.

==== Battle for the east side and the Samarkand gate ====
The east side of the citadel and the Samarkand gate were attacked at the same time as the north side was. The tribesmen hoped to overrun the Russian defenses in a shock attack. However, the shock attack failed and the tribesmen changed their tactics to besiege and to strategically capture the citadel. Tribesmen shooters occupied the buildings and houses either adjoined to the citadel's wall or in close proximity to the citadel. Similar to the north side, the tribesmen shooters had concealed firing positions that allowed them to remain hidden while firing at the Russian defenders. Tribesmen shooters also occupied any high building within Samarkand, including mosques, to fire down at the citadel. The streets of the citadel became dangerous to walk through due to the intense musket fire performed by the besieging shooters. Many of the Russian casualties were attributed to the enemy's musket fire. The large caliber muskets of the besieging army were deadly especially if one was hit in the head or body. If one was lucky to survive the gunshot wound, then one would usually be out of action due to the heavy injury.

After the first shock assault failed, the tribesmen regrouped and engaged in a firefight with the Russian defenders. The firefight lasted several hours. As the shootout continued, the tribesmen prepared to set the Samarkand gate afire. The buildings near the citadel's wall allowed the tribesmen to maneuver and to prepare an attack while remaining unnoticed. That advantage allowed masses of tribesmen to assemble close to the citadel without being affected by Russian artillery and rifle fire. It also provided the tribesmen with the element of surprise and left little time for the Russians to prepare for oncoming attacks.

At around two o'clock in the afternoon, the tribesmen approached the Samarkand gate to set it afire using bundles of straw ignited with gunpowder. At that moment, the Samarkand gate was guarded by 30 soldiers. Some of the tribesmen attempted to force through the half-burnt gate. They were met with the Russian defenders who were firing back and engaging in melee combat with bayonets. The Samarkand gate defenders were briefly assisted by a platoon from the reserve. Once the attack was repelled, the reserve platoon would quickly run to assist the defenders at the Bukhara gate.

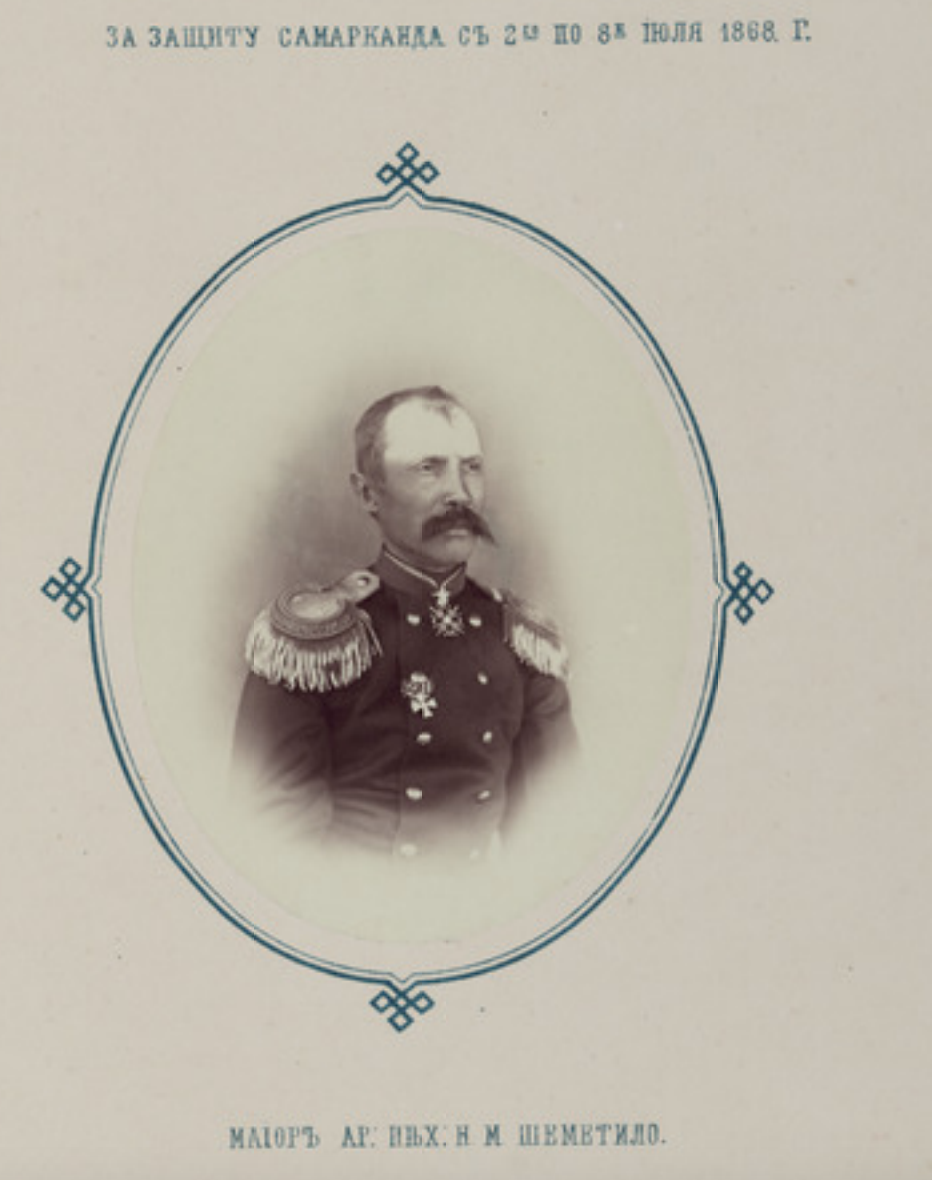
Captain Shemetillo - a participant of the siege and the defender of the Samarkand gate. Photo taken between 1871 and 1872. Text translates to: For the defence of Samarkand from 2nd to 8th June 1868 - Major of Artillery N. M. Shemetillo. In this photo Shemetillo is a Major. He was promoted and he received both a Order of St. George and Golden Weapon for Bravery for his courage in the siege.

As the day continued, the Samarkand gate was reinforced with an additional platoon commanded by Captain Shemetillo. That platoon would remain at the Samarkand gate for the rest of the siege. As the evening approached, the gate was burnt out. In order to secure the gate, a cannon was brought from the north side of the citadel and placed opposite of the gateway. The tribesmen attacked the Samarkand gate until the night. Each attack was repelled by artillery canister and rifle fire.

==== Battle for the south side and the Bukhara gate ====
The south side of the citadel and the Bukhara gate, that was in the southwest corner, saw some of the most intense fighting during the siege. When Major Stempel first exited the citadel to engage in a skirmish with the tribesmen, he would exit and return to the citadel through the Bukhara gate. As soon as Stempel returned, big masses of tribesmen gathered outside of the Bukhara gate. The Bukhara gate was immediately attacked by a large number of Shahrisabzi tribesmen. Some attackers tried to break down the gate while others climbed the wall using grappling hooks. Similar to the situation in the north and east sides, there were many buildings adjoined to the citadel's wall. Not only did they provide cover for the tribesmen, they also allowed the tribesmen to easily climb the citadel's wall. By mounting the roofs of adjoined buildings, the tribesmen could easily scale the wall and open fire at the Russians inside of the citadel. The Russians retaliated by firing back at the tribesmen who scaled over the wall.

The Bukhara gate was first defended by a handful of soldiers who lacked artillery support, but they had several hand grenades. Once the siege began, both sides exchanged gunfire. The tribesmen shooters used adjoined buildings as cover and picked off multiple Russian soldiers and officers.

It was at the Bukhara gate where Vereshchagin entered the combat and participated in the siege. Vereshchagin provides a detailed account of the intense gunfight.

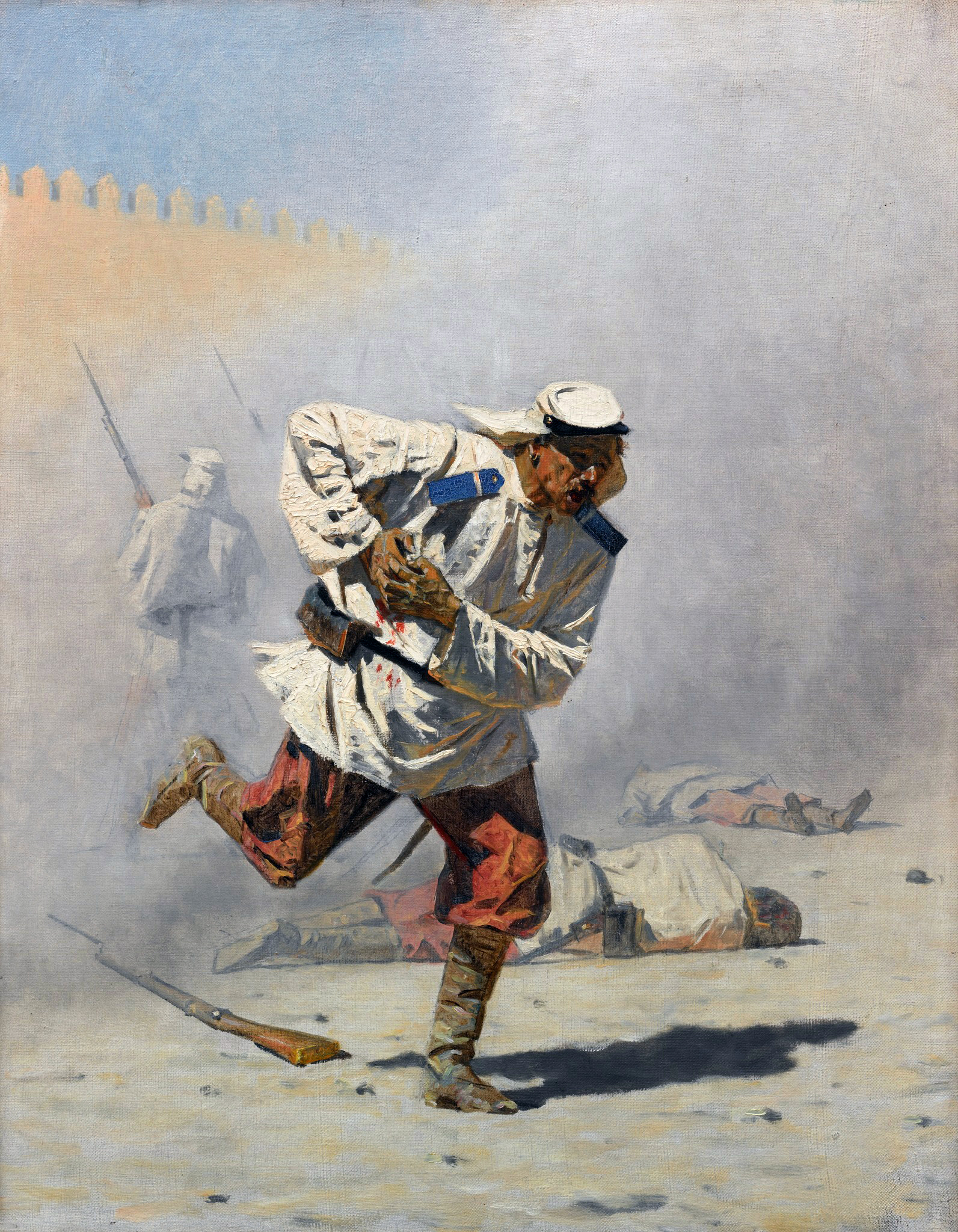
"Mortally wounded," an 1873 painting by Vasily Vereshchagin. The painting depicts a Russian soldier being mortally wounded by enemy gunfire. This painting was directly inspired by a moment that Vereshchagin witnessed during the siege.

Major Albedil arrived and assumed command over the defence of the Bukhara gate. However, Major Albedil was quickly injured right before Vereshchagin's eyes. Vereshchagin carried Major Albedil to the hospital that was one verst from the Bukhara gate. Major Albedil was shot in the leg and although he survived the siege, he was out of commission for the rest of the engagement. On his way back to the Bukhara gate, Vereshchagin met the reserve under the command of Lieutenant Colonel Nazarov. Vereshchagin's first impressions of Nazarov were positive as Nazarov calmed down several soldiers who were anxious due to the overwhelming siege. Vereshchagin would spend the rest of the siege beside Nazarov.

When Major Albedil was injured, the Bukhara gate was temporarily defended by the reserve platoon under the command of Ensign Sidorov - Sidorov and his platoon were the ones who temporarily aided the defenders at the Samarkand gate. Soon after, the Bukhara gate received the reinforcement reserve under the command of Nazarov.

Unlike the Samarkand gate that had an open line of fire because it was opposite a long city street, the Bukhara gate was open to a short street. In addition to that disadvantage, there were many buildings adjoined to the wall and the moat around the gate was not repaired. As a result, the moat presented itself as an easily scalable berm. Those disadvantages allowed large groups of tribesmen to advance closely to the Bukhara gate while remaining unnoticed and unpunished.

To fortify the now empty gateway, a breastwork of sandbags was constructed. It replaced the burned gate and provided cover for the Russian defenders, included embrasures that allowed Russian infantry to safely return fire, and allowed the cannon to be brought closer to the gate opening.

The tribesmen repeatedly attacked the Bukhara gate during the night. Each attack was repelled with canister and rifle fire.

By the end of the first day, the Russians lost 2 officers and 20 soldiers dead, 4 officers and 54 soldiers wounded. A total of 80 men. That amount of casualties was more than 10% of the Russian garrison.

=== Day two ===
Some parts of the besieging army took the night to rest while some parts to attack the citadel. On June 3, as dawn broke, the besieging army prepared to attack the citadel again. Around that time, Commandant Stempel sent a messenger to inform Kaufmann of the garrison's situation and request that Kaufmann return to lift the siege.

==== Assault on the west side of the citadel ====
The citadel was atop a hilllock. Due to its location, the west wall of the citadel was atop a crag. In order to reach the west wall, one would first have to navigate through the orchards and then one would have to scale the crag in order to reach the wall. The crag was hard to scale and that topographic feature prevented the besieging army from attacking the west side. Nevertheless, on the morning of June 3, around 30 tribesmen tried to penetrate the citadel through the west wall, but were noticed and the defenders killed five attackers and forced the rest to retreat. The west wall was secured. The small reserve would guard the west wall until they were replaced with battleworthy troops in the evening.

In order to secure the west side, Stempel ordered the construction of an artillery barbette. Because there were no soldiers available for the task, the citadel's twenty detained prisoners were employed. By the evening of June 3, one Bukharan cannon was brought to the barbette and hand grenades were redistributed to the defenders. The presence of a cannon helped to secure the west wall. The cannon also provided limited flanking fire at the enemy attacking from the southwest corner.

==== Battle for the east side and the Samarkand gate ====
At four o'clock in the morning, the battle at the Samarkand gate resumed. It began with both sides exchanging gunfire. By 4:30, the tribesmen again attacked the gate. The Samarkand gate had been burned down the previous day. In order to restore some form of protection, the defenders, under the guidance of Shtabs-Kapitan Bogaevsky, built a breastwork of sandbags in a manner similar to what had been built at the Bukhara gate. The tribesmen tried to charge the breastwork, but each time were repelled by canister shot and rifle fire. The few tribesmen who scaled over the wall into the citadel were taken down by melee and bayonets. One benefit of the Russian defences at the Samarkand gate was the advantage of a choke point. The narrow choke point, in addition to the open line of fire, allowed the outnumbered Russian defenders to successfully defend the Samarkand gate throughout the second day of the siege.

The only advantage the tribesmen still had were the numerous adjoined buildings and buildings in close proximity to the citadel. From within those buildings, the tribemen continued to shoot the defenders, killing several officers and soldiers during the day. By midday of June 3, Commandant Stempel realized that the adjoined buildings served as an advantage for the attackers and planned to destroy them.

The tribesmen also used falconets and light artillery, but it was largely ineffective against the citadel's thick walls and against the more modern Russian artillery.

==== Battle for the south side and a close call at the Bukhara gate ====
During the second day of the siege, the defensive position at the Bukhara gate was close to being overrun by the attackers.

The tribesmen attacked the south side at the same time as they attacked the east side. The tribesmen tried to force the Bukhara gate. On some occasions, the tribesmen scaled over the wall, but each time they were easily repelled.

The tribesmen also tried to outflank the Russian defence by scaling the wall at an outgoing angle to the left side of the Bukhara gate. Several of such attempts were repelled by a small number of defenders. Stempel sent one mortar and hand grenades to the location. The use of artillery and grenades drove the tribesmen from that position. The Russians consolidated their defence at that position. Each enemy attack was easily repelled.

The Russian merchants who remained in the citadel prepared food provision for the defenders.

During one of the breaks between the attacks, the amount of defenders at the Bukhara gate increased because Commandant Stempel diverted all of his possible reserves to that position. Stempel came to a conclusion, a conclusion that turned out to be correct, that the Bukhara gate remained the citadel's weakest spot. At that moment, according to Vereshchagin, there were about 150 soldiers stationed at the Bukhara gate.

Soon after, the most critical attack occurred: The tribesmen performed a stealth attack combined with a frontal assault.

At around 8:00 in the morning, during a silent period between attacks, as the Russian soldiers rested, apparently the tribesmen quietly occupied one adjoined building connected to the citadel's wall from the outside. That building prevented them from being noticed. Inside of that building, the tribesmen dug a tunnel through the citadel's wall without being noticed. The tunnel went through the wall and into the interior of a house inside of the citadel that was adjoined to the wall.

Suddenly, the tribesmen launched their largest attack yet. Dozens of tribesmen emerged from a house within the citadel, surprising the Russian defenders. Simultaneously, the tribesmen attacked the gate's breastwork. As the tribesmen attacked, their shooters opened fired at the Russians in close proximity. Other tribesmen hurled stones and bricks at the Russians. This time, the shock attack worked. The Russians were startled and confused. The tribesmen rushed and overwhelmed the Russian breastwork at the gate. By doing so, the tribesmen breached into the citadel and captured the Russian cannon.

Vereshchagin witnessed the difficult situation, rallied the men around him, and led the counterattack by charging first himself.

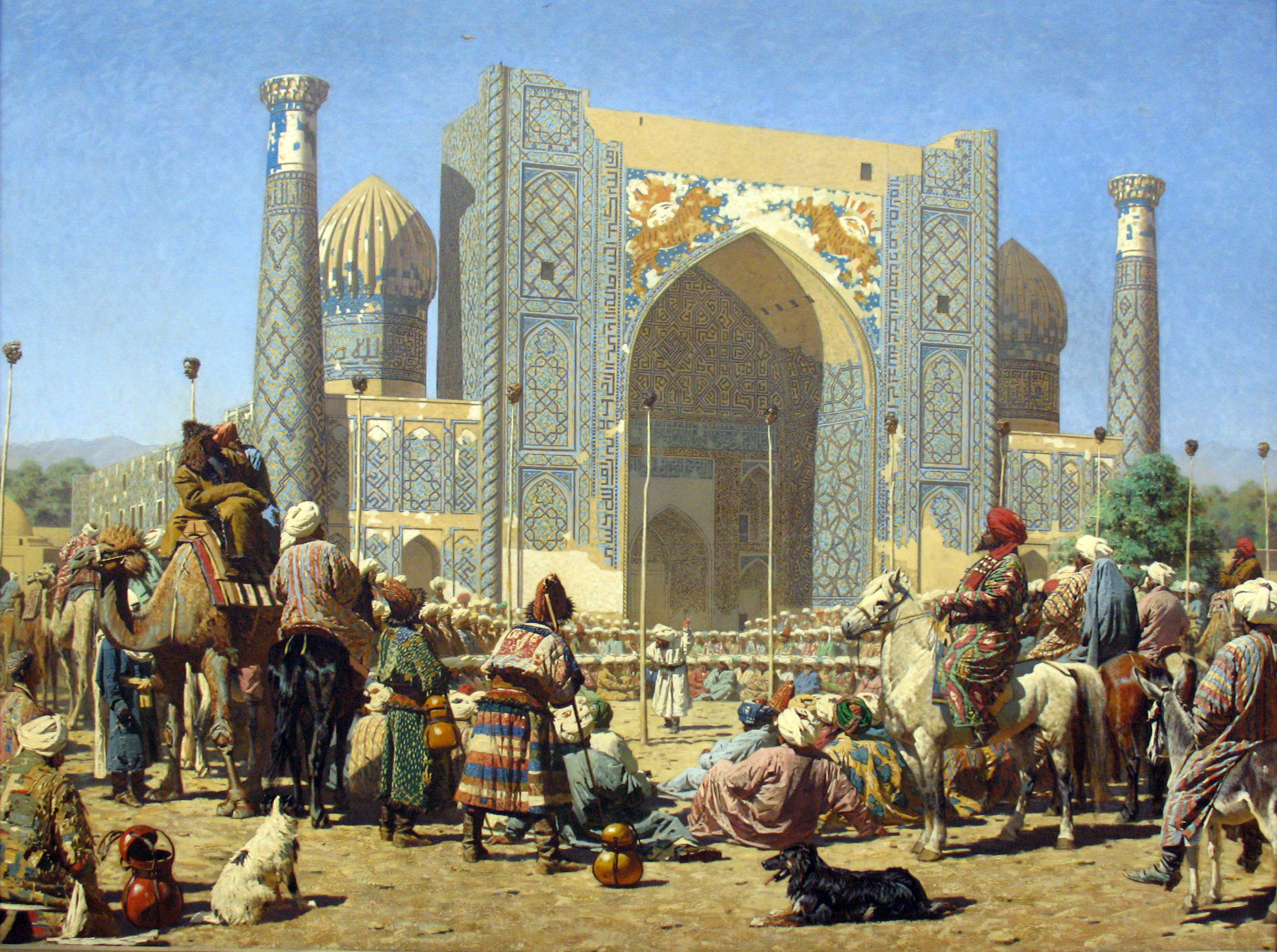
They are triumphant by Vasily Vereshchagin. Another painting that was directly related to his experiences during the siege. According to Vereshchagin, when several Russian defenders were captured by the tribesmen, their head were impaled on poles. This painting depicts the tribesmen celebrating their triumph on the Registan square in Samarkand.

Vereshchagin and Nazarov, along with other soldiers, rushed into the house and ousted the tribesmen. However, the counterattack was a difficult one. Vereshchagin and Nazarov rushed the position and remained unscathed. Other soldiers, who followed them in the counterattack, were either killed or even captured.

As Vereshchagin and Nazarov ousted the attackers from the house, Cherkasov and Voronets led the counterattack at the gate. Fighting with sabres and bayonets, the Russians pushed the tribesmen out and recovered the breastwork and the cannon. The critical attack was repelled, but the Russians were too tired to counterattack into the city. In that engagement alone, forty people were killed.

The tribesmen attacked until 15:00 in the afternoon. None of their following attacks came as close to overwhelming the garrison as the one at the Bukhara gate did.

==== The garrison's heavy loses and Stempel's decision for a last stand ====
By the end of day two, the Russian garrison suffered a total of 150 casualties - more than 20% of the defenders. Commandant Stempel realized how dire the situation was becoming. He made preparations for a last stand in the case that the citadel was breached. The Khan's palace was selected as the final redoubt and it was fortified. The entire storage of gunpowder was also brought into the palace. Stempel intended to blow up the entire supply of gunpowder if the garrison was to fall.

==== Russian nighttime sortie ====
When the night began, the Russians left the citadel and they set the surrounding buildings on fire. The counterattack took place both from the Samarkand and Bukhara gates. The Russians created a small esplanade around both of the gates. The esplanade enhanced their defensive abilities and it removed the advantages that the tribesmen had during the first two days of the siege.

=== Day three ===
On June 4, as dawn broke, the besieging army once again attacked the citadel. However, those attacks were significantly weaker than the previous ones.

==== Shahrisabzi tribesmen abandon the siege ====
One reason why the attacks were weaker was because the Shahrisabzi tribesmen, the bulk of the besieging army, abandoned the siege. The Shahrisabzi received news that Emir had been defeated at Zerabulak and that the main Russian army was returning to Samarkand. Those news, combined with the heavy losses and failure to take the citadel, discouraged the Shahrisabzi from continuing the siege. The Shahrisabzi left Samarkand, thus decreasing the numbers of the besieging army.

==== Nazarov leads a sortie ====
The tribesmen continued to attack until the afternoon. Each attack was easily repelled. At afternoon, Nazarov made the decision to lead a counterattack to destroy more buildings that were close to the gate and wall. Russian soldiers walked along the citadel's wall and set every building afire. The counterattack lasted for one hour and no soldiers were lost. The counterattack destroyed more buildings that the tribesmen were using as cover.

==== Commandant Stempel sends more messengers ====
During the third day of the siege, Commandant Stempel sent more messengers to inform Kaufmann. Only one of the seven messengers Stempel sent to Kaufmann arrived.

=== Day four ===
By June 5, the besieging army lost the initiative. The tribesmen could no longer perform massive attacks on the citadel and their shooters lost the close range firing advantage.

==== Nazarov attacks the city's marketplace ====
On June 5, before dawn broke, Nazarov led his soldiers towards Samarkand's marketplace. The marketplace was 200 sazhens, about 425 meters, from the citadel. The Russians set it afire, and they returned to the citadel without losing a single man. The city's marketplace was a gathering spot for the besieging tribesmen. The fact that the outnumbered Russian garrison managed to perform such counterattacks had demotivated the besieging army.

==== Russian garrison makes another sortie ====
The final Russian counterattack was led by Nazarov and Captain Shemetillo. The Russians walked out of the Bukhara gate and then they walked along the citadel's wall towards the Samarkand gate. As they walked, they set more buildings afire. Many tribesmen, who were mostly armed with melee weapons, fled. The action completely destroyed several streets of houses and buildings. Following this counterattack, there were no more buildings that were near the citadel.

Those counterattacks deprived the besieging army of every advantage they had. The tribesmen could no longer approach the citadel without being noticed. The tribesmen shooters could no longer shoot at the citadel from nearby. Finally, any further attacks would require the tribesmen to charge through a wide open esplanade, thus they could no longer perform shock attacks. The tribesmen shooters continued picking off Russian defenders, but at a much lower rate.

==== State of the garrison by day four ====
Despite holding out for two more days and gaining some advantages in the counterattacks, the Russian defenders were tired. Food and fresh water were running low.

=== Day five ===
==== Resupplying fodder ====
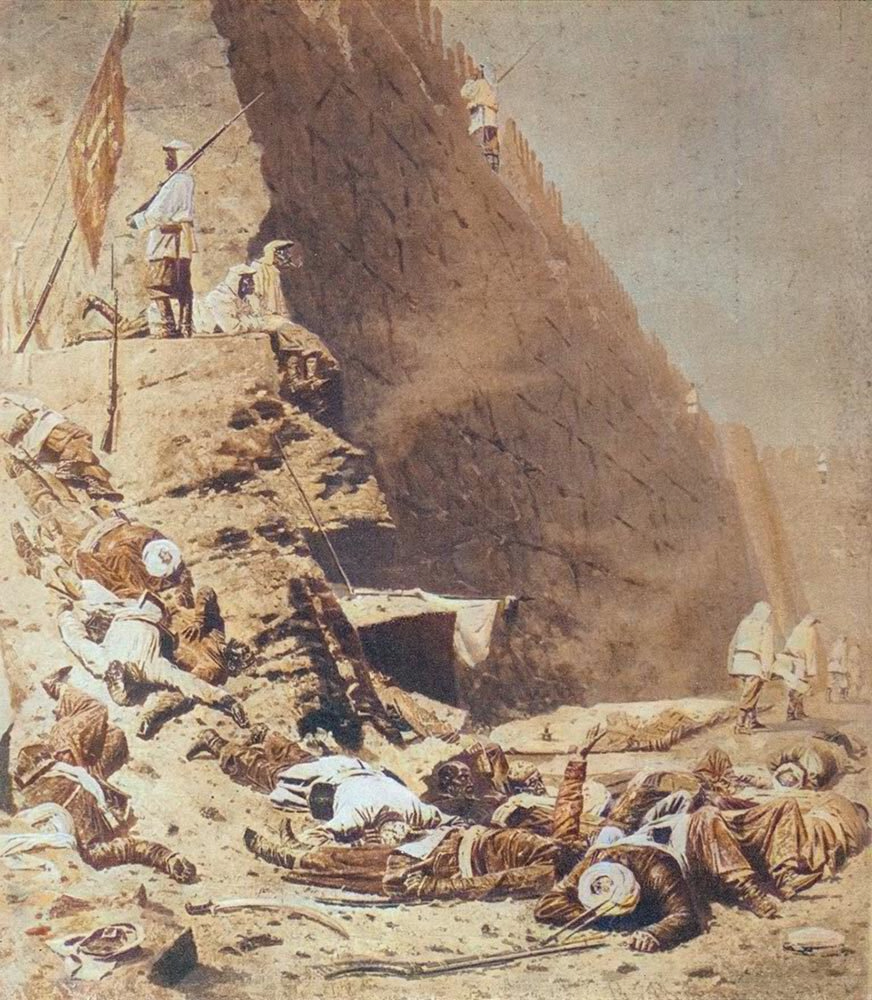
At the fortress wall. They Entered, the second painting of Vereshchagin's Let Them Enter painting. This painting depicts the aftermath of an engagement at a breach in the citadel's wall. It is likely that this painting depicts the latter days of the siege because Russian soldiers are safely standing on the wall and other soldiers are cleaning up bodies - both of those were impossible in the first days of the siege.

On the morning of June 6, a Persian aksakal, who had pledged allegiance to the Russians, reached the citadel promised to bring some provisions. He pledged to deliver another message from Stempel to Kaufmann. A small group of soldiers, including Nazarov and Vereshchagin, exited through the orchards, gathered fodder, and returned to the citadel. That act helped to refill the garrison's depleted supply of fodder.

==== The proposal for the Russians to surrender ====
During the fifth day of the siege, the tribesmen made no major attacks. The Russians too did not make any sorties because it was too risky. The siege was in a stalemate.

On day five, a parlimentaire from the besieging army approached the citadel. Vereshchagin escorted the parlimentaire to Commandant Stempel. Apparently, the parlimentaire brought a message that offered the Russians to surrender. Commandant Stempel strictly rejected that offer.

=== Day six ===
On June 7, the Persian aksakal returned to the citadel with a reply from Kaufmann. He was the seventh and the only messenger to deliver the message and return with a reply. Kaufmann's reply informed the garrison that the relief army was just a day's march away from the city. Kaufmann assured that he would lift the siege the following morning.

Besides those news, the sixth day of the siege was uneventful. The besieging tribesmen continued exchanging gunfire with the Russian garrison. Later in the evening, the tribesmen made a last-ditch attack. That attack was small and weak. It was easily repelled.

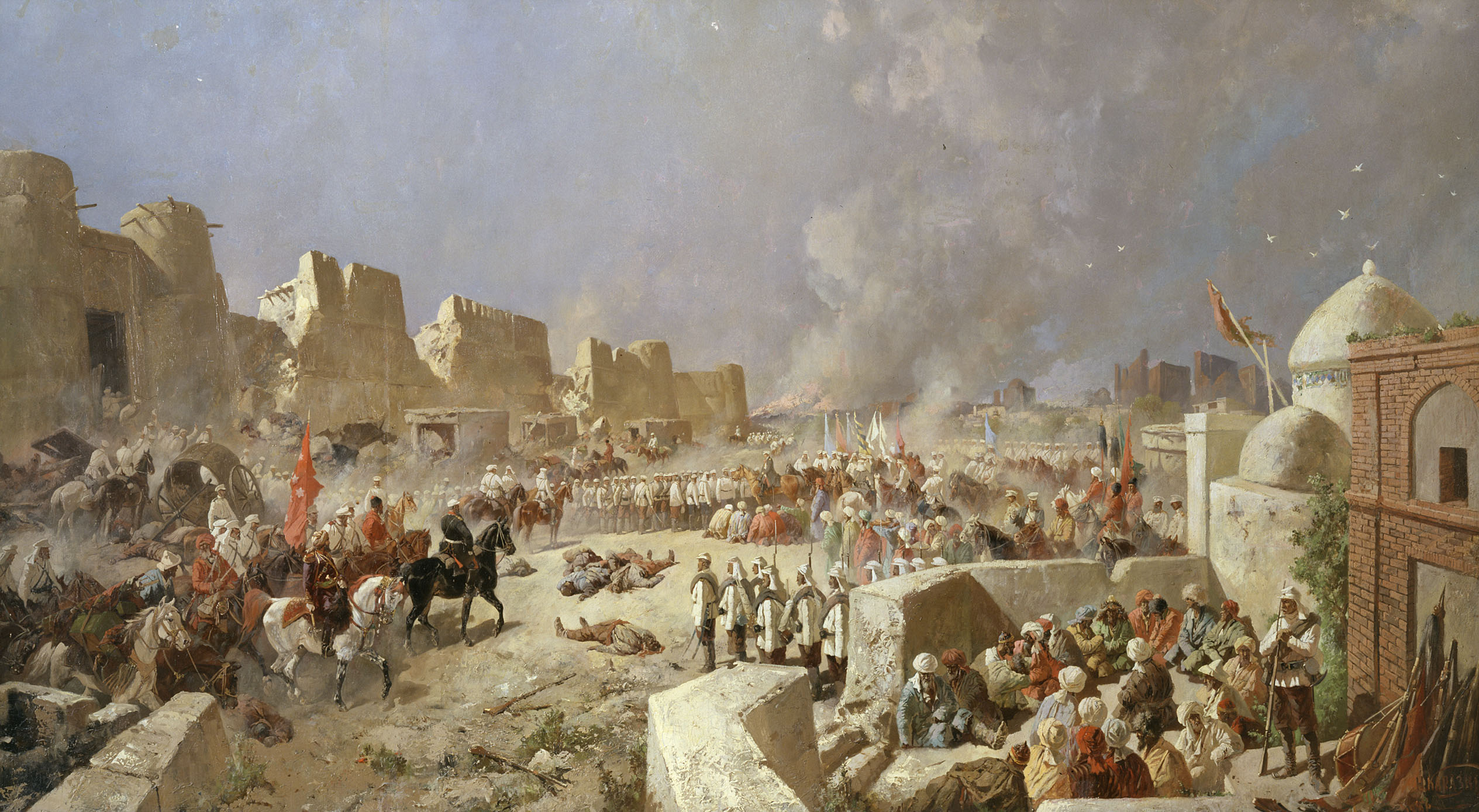
Kaufmann's relief army enters Samarkand and lifts the siege - June 8 (20), 1868. A painting by Nikolay Karazin.

=== Kaufmann lifts the siege ===
On June 8, the main Russian army under the command of Kaufmann reached Samarkand. Because the city was still occupied by large numbers of tribesmen, the Russian army prepared to storm the city. However, the Russians discovered that the besieging army had retreated from Samarkand. Once the relief army met the garrison, the siege was over.

=== Russian repercussion ===
The siege was lifted, but some tribesmen remained in Samarkand and continued to fire. The Russian army either expelled, killed, or captured the remaining tribesmen. The brief battle lasted until noon.

Angered by the betrayal of the city and its inhabitants, Kaufmann gave the order to strictly punish the traitors. One act of punishment was to burn down the city's marketplace. The Russian soldiers, some led by Nazarov, ravaged the city. They looted the marketplace before setting it afire. During the combat, many buildings, including several mosques, were also destroyed.

After hostilities ended, the Russians convicted the detained tribesmen of treason and then executed them by a firing squad. Many of Samarkand's inhabitants who collaborated with the besieging army were also faced with grim fates.

By the end of the siege, a fraction of Samarkand's population was killed and a fraction of the city was destroyed. The city required extensive cleaning and repair.

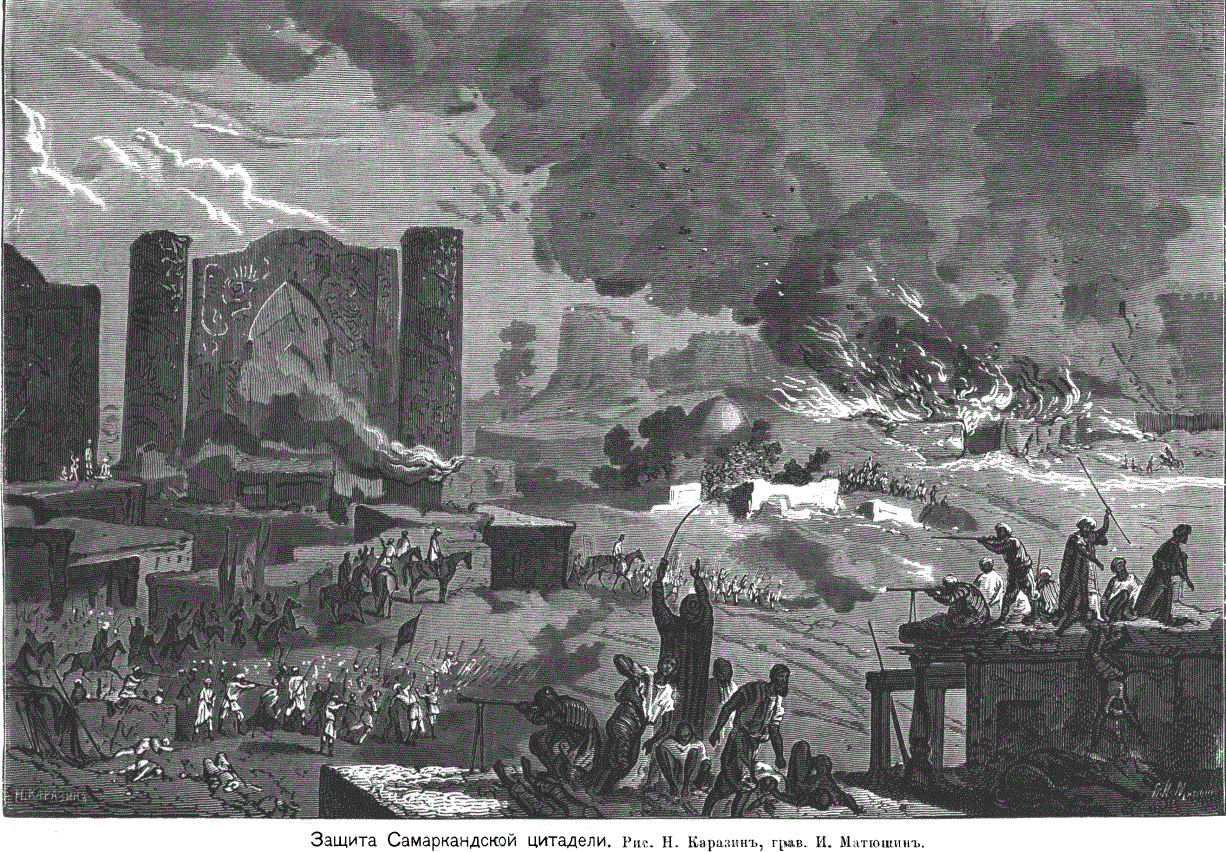
1872 illustration of the siege.

180-221 Russian soldiers were either killed or wounded. Many Russian soldiers also fell ill or were hospitalized due to fatigue after the siege ended. After the siege's end, the citadel's hospital was full of ill and wounded soldiers. There was not enough staff to tend the hospitalized soldiers.

== Aftermath ==
After the capture of Samarkand, Russian Major General Alexander Konstantinovich Abramov forcibly removed the Samarkand Codex of the Quran of Uthman from the madrassa of Khoja Ahrar, despite the local ulama's attempt to prevent this by evacuating the manuscript to Bukhara, and sent it to the Imperial Library in Saint Petersburg (now the Russian National Library). In a manner typical of European colonists in the nineteenth century, Konstantin Petrovich von Kaufmann, the first Governor-General of Russian Turkestan, claimed that the present-day inhabitants of Samarkand did not value the Quran nor understand its extreme rarity and antiquity, while Russian newspapers celebrated the Quran's removal to Saint Petersburg as the salvation of a great "antiquity, invaluable to science."

Following the Russian victory at Samarkand, combined with the victory at Zerabulak, the Emir of Bukhara sued for peace. Emir Muzaffar no longer had an army to resist the Russians. Samarkand was also a historically and religiously important city in the Emirate of Bukhara. The loss of Samarkand convinced many Bukharan people to accept the Russian Tsar as their new ruler.

Having secured Samarkand, the Russian army also obtained a foothold of the Emirate's water resources. Several days after the siege ended, Bukharan envoys reached the city to negotiate with the Russians. One of the first things the Bukharans were concerned about was the security of water for the Emirate.

As a result of the 1868 campaign, the Russian conquest of Bukhara ended. The Emirate of Bukhara became a dependent protectorate of the Russian Empire.

In the following years, a civil war broke out in Bukhara as a result of the Emir's political weakness.

Many of the citadel's defenders were praised and awarded for their valour. Commandant Stempel and Nazarov were promoted. Many other officers and soldiers were promoted as well. For his heroism in action, Vasily Vereshchagin was awarded with a 4th class Order of St. George.

In addition to solidifying Russian control over Turkestan, the victory at Samarkand was seen by the Russian army as a symbol of Russia's renewed heroism and martial prowess—both had previously been tested by the Russian defeat in the Crimean War.
