= Nikolai Golovachev =

Russian general (b. 1823)

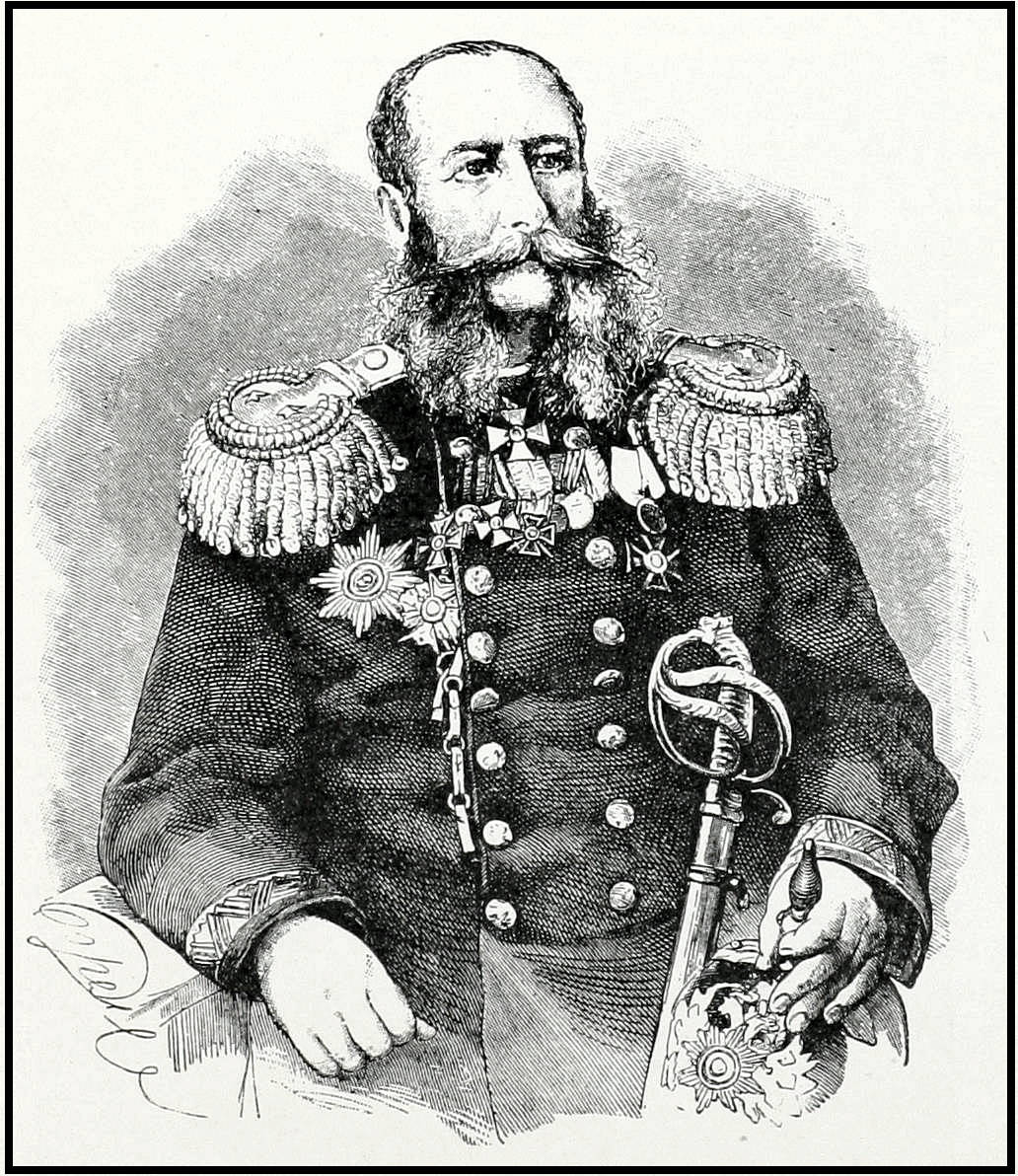
General Nikolai Golovachev

Nikolai Nikitich Golovachev (born 1823, died 1887) was a Russian general, participant in the Caucasian War and Turkestan campaigns. He was born on 10 December 1823 in the city of Bolkhov, Orel province. He received his initial education at home, and then entered the Main Engineering School, in which he graduated in 1844 as a warrant officer.

After spending about four years in the service of the engineering department, in 1848 he was assigned to the 77th Tengin Infantry Regiment with the rank of second lieutenant and immediately took part in the Caucasus campaigns. He marked his service in the Tengin regiment with a number of distinctions in battles against the highlanders in Chechnya, for which he received awards with ranks and orders.

In 1854, with the rank of captain, Golovachev was transferred to the 78th Navaginsky Infantry Regiment, where he commanded a company until 1860, when he was promoted to colonel for his actions against the mountaineers, being appointed commander of the 79th Kurinsky Infantry Regiment. Remaining still the commander of this regiment, Golovachev in 1860 was appointed head of the Ichkeriya district, where he remained until 1867. On June 23, 1867 Golovachev was promoted to major general, with the appointment of the military governor of the Syr Darya region in Turkestan, and on September 21 he arrived in Tashkent, the place of his new service.

In April 1868, the Bukhara campaign began, the result of which was the conquest of almost the entire Miyankal valley and the capture of Samarkand, Golovachev himself directly commanded the troops in the battles on the Chapan-Ata heights and at Zerabulak. For distinction in the Bukhara campaign, he was awarded the Order of St. George 4th degree.

The period from 1868 to 1873 was devoted to various administrative orders for the management of the region entrusted to him. Meanwhile, relations between Russia and Khiva became more and more strained. In view of a possible new campaign across the steppe to Khiva, in the autumn of 1871, Golovachev personally began to inspect the roads along the steppe to Khiva and the Amu-Darya river. On 17 September he set out with a retinue and an escort and crossed the Kyzylkum steppe to Min-Bulak and then, connecting with the speaker who spoke to him about the Kazalinsky detachment, he returned through Irki-Bai to Kazalinsk. Despite all the difficulties and hardships that the steppe nature presented, the successful campaign to Khiva in 1873 is explained mainly by the close acquaintance of the commanding persons with the roads of the steppe.

On May 11, at Uch-Uchak, Nikolai Nikitich commanded the troops that defeated the enemy who blocked the way to the Amu-Darya, and on May 17 in the artillery battle at the Sheikh-Aryk crossing, where the enemy camp on the bank of the Amu-Darya was shot down and destroyed.

For the Khiva campaign, Golovachev on 22 July 1873 was awarded the Order of St. George 3rd degree. In the same year, on July 7, after the occupation of Khiva by Russian troops, he was instructed, with a part of the Turkestan detachment and with two Caucasian (Sunzhenskaya and Dagestan) mounted irregulars, to punish the Yomud Turkmens who refused to fulfill the demand of Governor-General von Kaufman regarding payment of indemnity. In the battles of 10, 13, 15 and 17 July 1873, the Yomuds and the Turkmens of other clans who joined them were utterly defeated and driven into the sands. In particular, the battle of Chandir was bloody on July 15, when 10,000 Turkmens attacked Golovachev's detachment early in the morning, and Golovachev was wounded by a saber blow to the arm. After an hour and a half of heated battle, the Turkmens left the battlefield.

For the Turkmen expedition, Golovachev was awarded the Order of St. Vladimir, 2nd degree. In the same year he was promoted to lieutenant general.

In August 1875, Golovachev took part in suppressing an uprising in Kokand. The highest order received by Golovachev was the Order of St. Alexander Nevsky with swords. He held the post of military governor until 1877.

Upon retirement, Nikolai Nikitich, from 1884 until his death, was leader of the nobility of the Sosnitsa district.

He died in the town of Men in the Sosnitsky district of the Chernigov province on 13 March 1887.
