= Russian conquest of Bukhara =

1842–1868 Imperial Russian conquest of the Emirate of Bukhara

Russo-Bukharan War
- Part of the Russian conquest of Central Asia
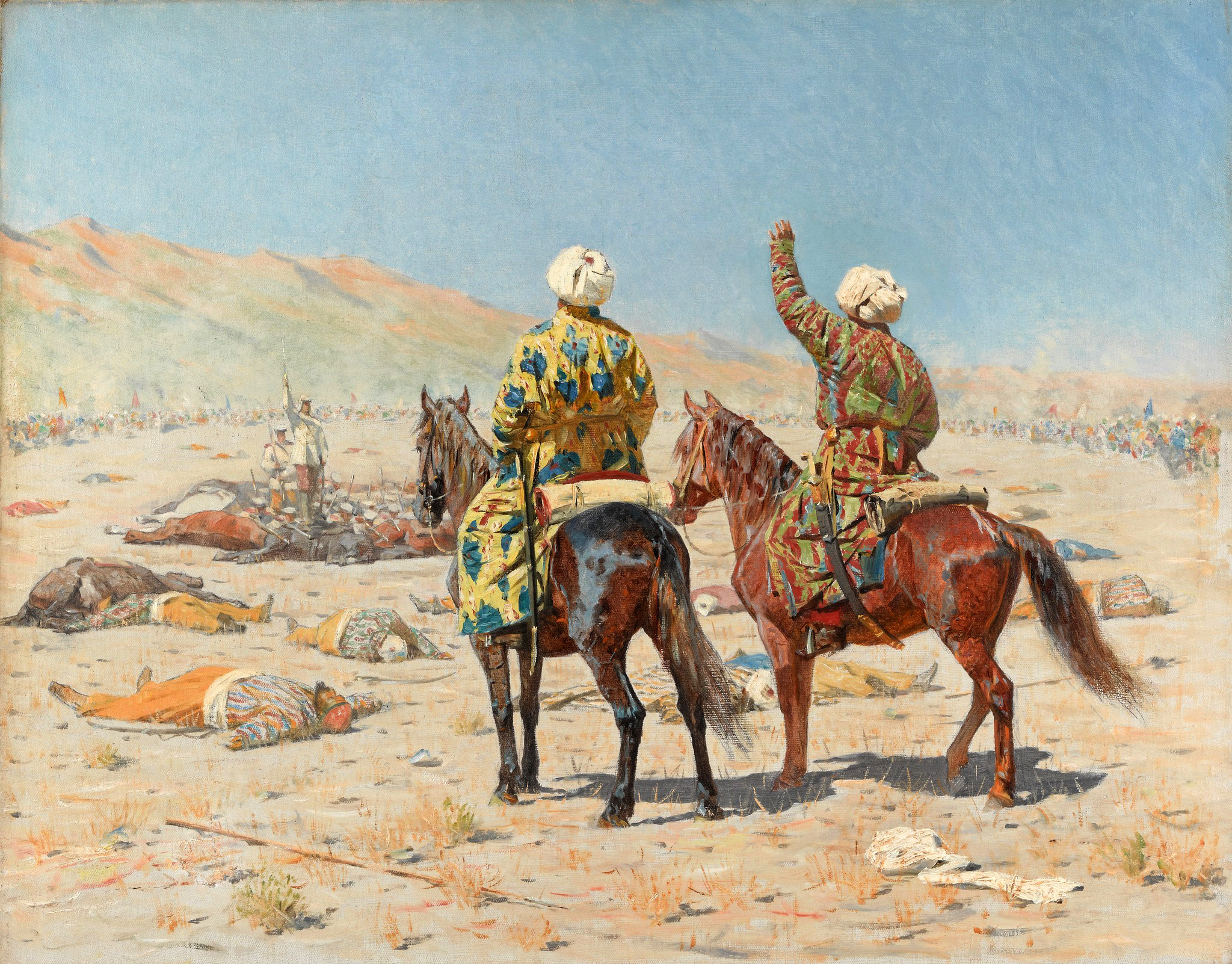
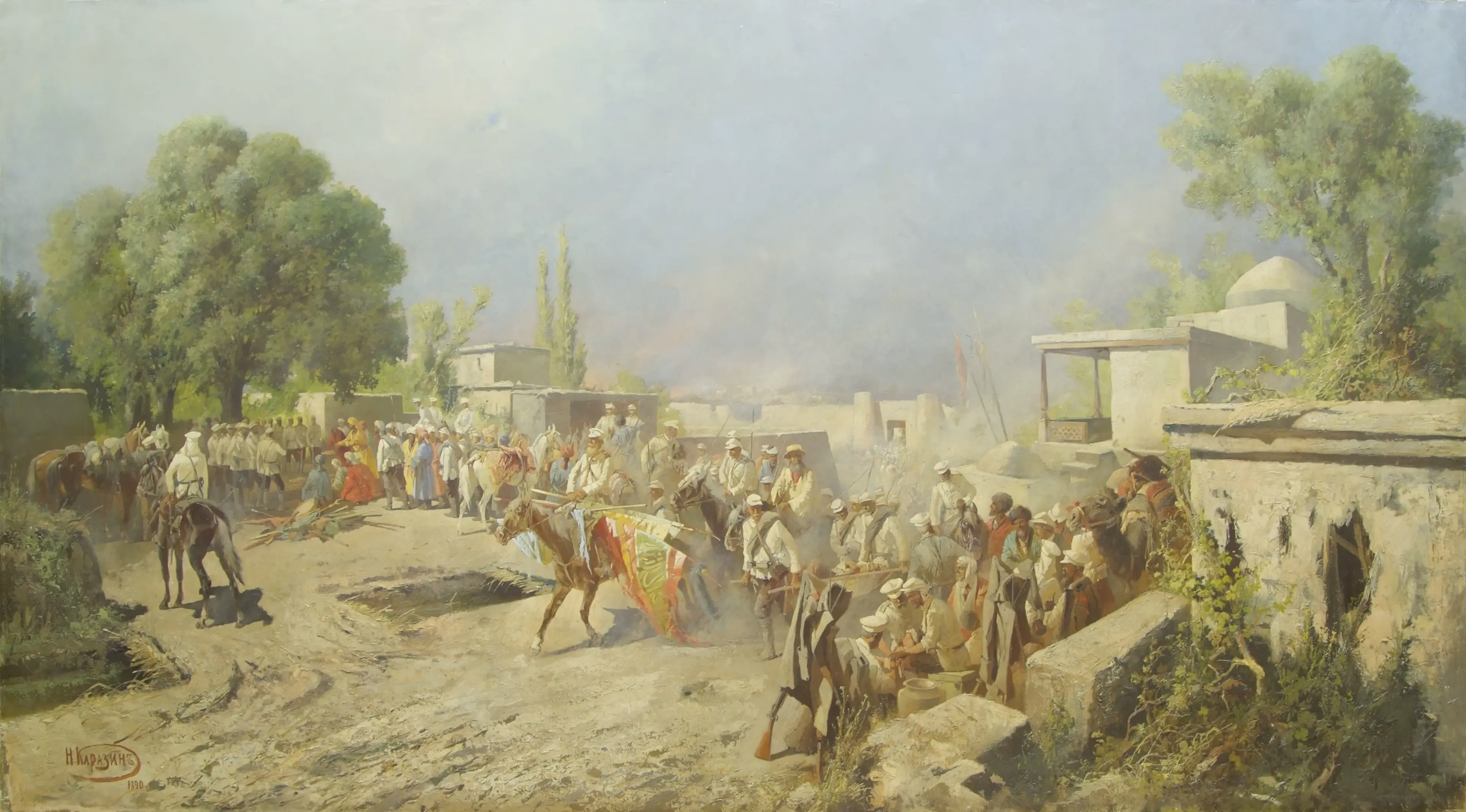
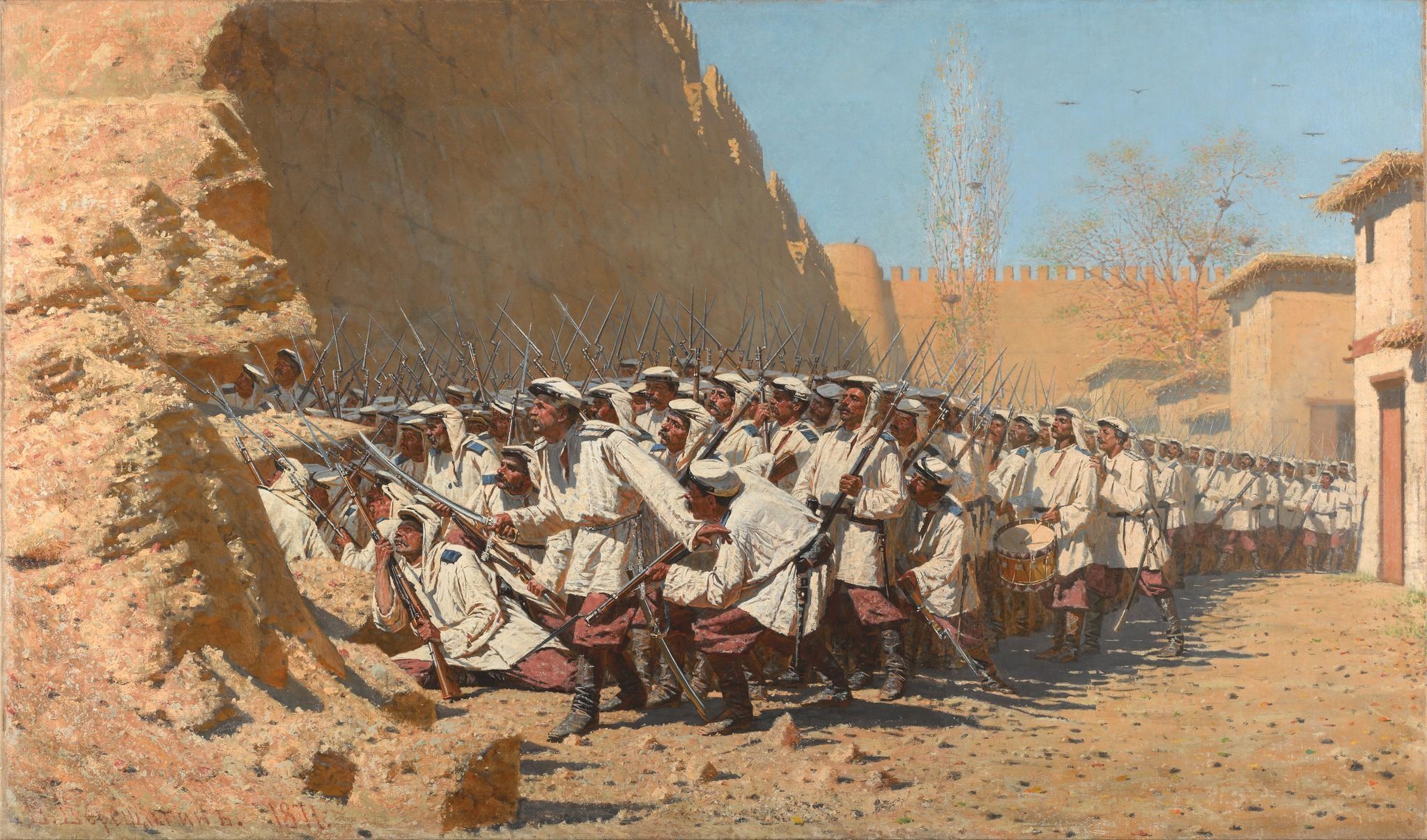
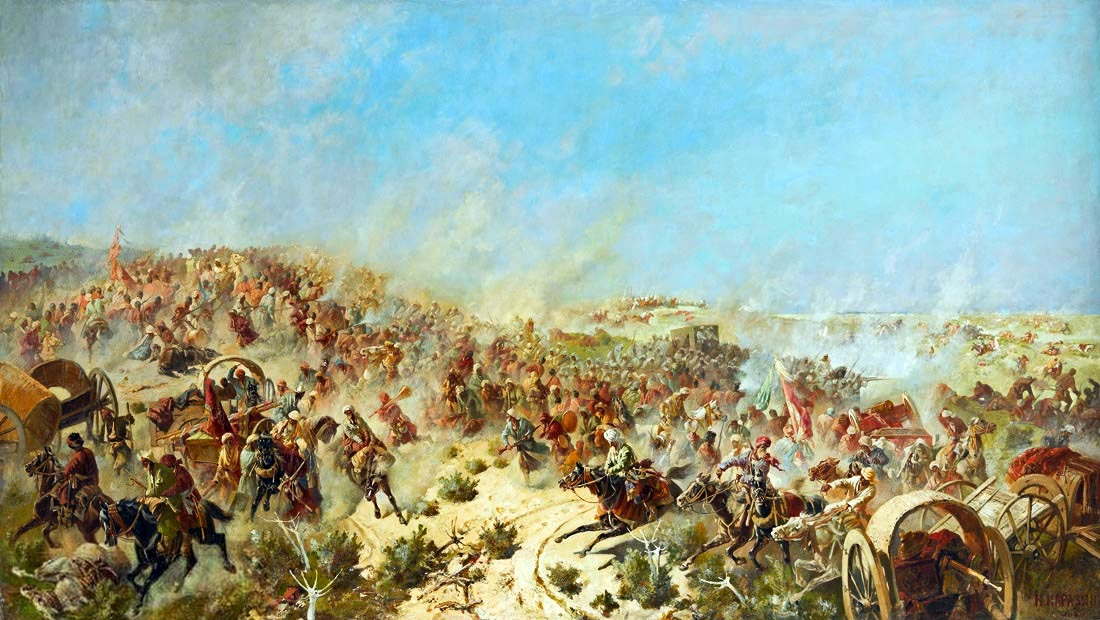
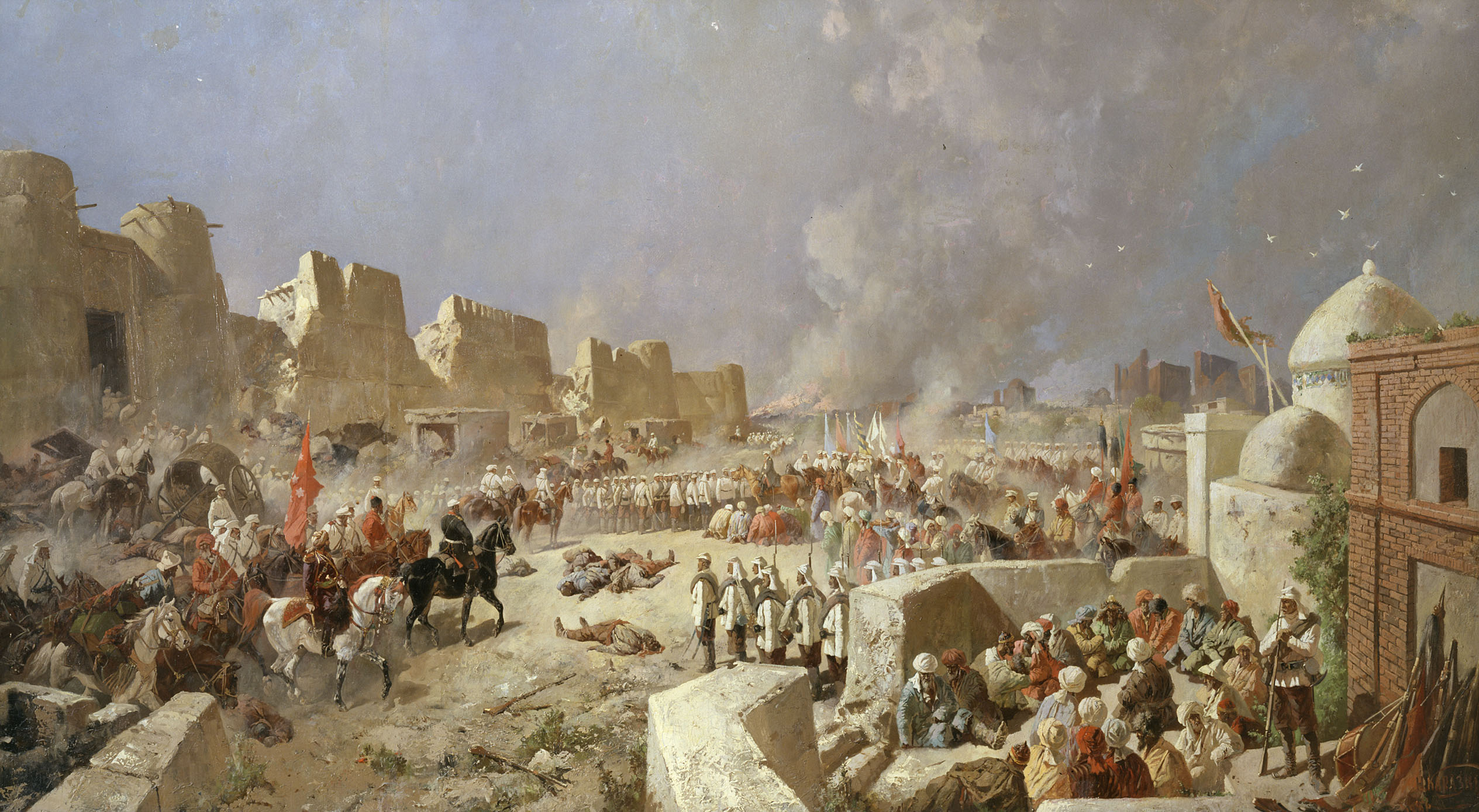
- An episode from the Battle of Ican Siege of Tashkent Heights of Chupan-Ata near Samarkand Russian defenders during the Siege of Samarkand Emir's defeat at the Battle of Zerabulak Kaufmann lifts the siege of Samarkand
Date	1842 – 20 May 1868
Location	Central Asia (i.e., Uzbekistan)
Result	Russian victory
Territorial changes	Bukhara becomes a new imperial protectorate of Russia

Belligerents
Russian Empire	Emirate of Bukhara; Supported by: (Khanate of Kokand) Kokand Khanate; Uzbek tribes; Turkmen Tribes

Commanders and leaders
(Russian Empire) Nicholas I (Russian Empire) Alexander II	(Emirate of Bukhara) Nasrullah Khan (Emirate of Bukhara) Muzaffar ad-Din

Strength
5,000	~70,000

Casualties and losses
174 killed 822 wounded	13,300 killed 1,500 wounded 3,000 captured 53 guns

The Russian conquest of Bukhara, better known as the Russo-Bukharan War, was a series of wars, invasions, and subsequent conquests of the Central Asian Emirate of Bukhara by the Russian Empire.

== The Beginning of the Conquest of the Bukhara Emirate ==
After the capture of Tashkent, the Tsarist government’s next plan was to conquer the khanates one by one. All military operations were organized and directed from Tashkent. To achieve this, a policy aimed at preventing the khanates from uniting was pursued.

The Tsarist government recalled M. Chernyaev from Central Asia to St. Petersburg and appointed Dmitry Ilyich Romanovskiy as the governor of the Turkestan region in his place. In 1866, using the pretext that the Bukhara Emirate was preparing for war against Russia, F. Romanovsky requested permission from the Emperor to launch a military campaign against it.

Once this proposal was accepted by the government, Romanovsky began occupying the middle reaches of the Syr Darya. The first battle occurred on May 8, 1866, near the village of Irjar, where the Emir’s forces were defeated due to military inferiority. Romanovsky then halted the pursuit of the Bukhara army and advanced toward Khojand, a strategic location linking Tashkent, Kokand, Balkh, and Bukhara, before confronting the Bukhara Emirate and the Kokand Khanate.

In May, Khojand Fortress was besieged by the troops of the Governor-General of Turkestan and bombarded with 20 cannons.s The siege continued until the next morning, followed by an assault. After repeated attacks, the city was shelled again. The siege and bombardment lasted two days. The city defenders fought bravely for every inch of territory, but the Tsarist’ forces, superior in both military equipment and numbers, broke through the defenses by the night of May 24. The streets were left strewn with the bodies of defenders and civilians, and buildings lay in ruins.

== Establishment of Russian Imperial Protectorate over the Bukhara Emirate ==
=== Early battles ===
==== Battle of Ican ====
In 1864, a small Cossack detachment was surrounded and attacked by a much larger army. Despite being outnumbered, the Cossack army manged to break out of the encirclement and survive the engagement. The Cossacks lost 102 men killed or wounded.

==== Capture of Tashkent ====
In 1865, Mikhail Chernyayev led a small Russian army to capture the city of Tashkent. The city's capture opened a pathway for further Russian campaigns.

==== 1866 campaign ====
During 1866, the Russian army captured the city of Khujand and defeated the Emir's army at Irjar. Those defeats convinced the Emir to accept Russian peace terms; however, the Emir still had enough manpower to resist and he therefore stalled the ratification of the treaty. Meanwhile, illness spread among the Russian troops stationed in Turkestan which decimated their numbers. The Governor-General dispatched for reinforcements in order replenish the troops and prepare for further campaigns.

==== 1868 campaign ====
After the peace treaty was not ratified, Governor-General von Kaufman decided to continue the campaign against Emir Muzaffar. The Emirate’s military was weakened due to continuous wars with the Kokand Khanate, internal disputes, and technological inferiority. Kaufmann studied the border territories carefully and proposed a new treaty to Emir Muzaffar, which would alter the border in Russia’s favor. The Emir refused to ratify the new terms.

Meanwhile, Bukharan detachments continued to raid Russian strongholds in the region. In order to decisively defeat the Emir, Kaufmann assembled a military detachment of 3,500 troops, with 16 artillery pieces, and began marching towards Samarkand in April 1868. The Russian army marhced 75 kilometers over the course of two days. The detachment arrived earlier than anticipated by the Emir, who failed to assemble his forces or to prepare the battlefield in time.

Bukharan forces occupied the heights of Chupan-Ata on the outskirts of Samarkand. On May 1, 1868, Kaufmann attacked the hill. Despite continuous fire from rifles and cannons, the Russian troops crossed the Zarafshon river and took the hill, forcing the Emir’s advanced units to retreat. The following day, Samarkand surrendered without a fight while Emir retreated towards Bukhara.

Kaufmann spent the entirety of May searching for the Emir and his army. In late May, Kaufmann marched towards Bukhara while leaving a small garrison to guard Samarkand. In June 1868, Kaufmann located and decisively defeated Emir's regular army at the Battle of Zerabulak. Despite having numerical superiority, the Emir’s army was again defeated.

Parallel to the Battle of Zerabulak, combined armies of the Emirate besieged the Russian garrison in Samarkand. The Emirate's armies were joined by citizens of Samarkand, who rebelled against the Russian garrison. The Emirate's armies were led by the rulers of Kitob (Jorabek) and Shahrisabz (Bobobek). The numerically superior army attacked the Russian garrison. During the six day siege, the Russian garrison suffered heavy casualties and was close to being overrun. Kaufmann returned to lift the siege on day six. As a result of the siege, a part of the city was destroyed and fraction of the city's population was killed.

Local populations also resisted Russian military campaigns. For example, during Kaufman’s campaigns against Bukhara, the residents of Urgut fought Tsarist forces. When General Abramov was sent to demand the city’s surrender, the locals refused. Fierce fighting ensued, and despite artillery superiority, the fortress was eventually taken by the colonizers. Following Urgut, Russian forces captured the city of Kattaqorgon.

The combined victories of the 1868 campaign had effectively defeated the regular armies of the Emir. Emir Muzaffar no longer had the means to resist the Russians and he lost Samarkand, an important city. The city was a historically and a religiously important city in the Emirate of Bukhara. Samarkand also controlled the Emirate's water resources, which coerced the Emir to sue for peace.

== Bukhara Emirate as a Russian Protectorate ==
The Tsarist government established the Zarafshan District, comprising the Samarkand and Kattaqorgon regions, under the administration of General Abramov. After the battle of Zirabuloq, Emir Muzaffar accepted his defeat and agreed to the new territorial terms proposed by von Kaufman, marking the end of the second phase of Russian imperial conquest.

On June 23, 1868, in Samarkand, Emir Muzaffar signed a treaty making the Bukhara Emirate a Russian protectorate. The treaty acknowledged that the Emir had caused the war and required 500,000 rubles to cover Russian military expenses as a symbol of eternal friendship. Territories from Tashkent to Samarkand, including Khojand, Uratapa, Panjikent, Jizzakh, Samarkand, and Kattaqorgon, came under Russian control. The Emir retained authority over his remaining territories but had to follow the directives of the Turkestan Governor-General. For this political dependence, historians often describe the Bukhara ruler as a vassal. Russian merchants were allowed to trade freely and were protected; customs duties could not exceed 2.5% of the goods’ total value, and they were permitted to move goods freely to other countries.

This treaty, humiliating and impoverishing the Emirate, sparked opposition. Emir Muzaffar’s eldest son, Abdumalik To’ra, along with Jorabek and Bobobek, continued the fight to liberate Samarkand. They declared Abdumalik To’ra as Emir and captured Shahrisabz, then Qarshi and Karmana. However, lacking modern weapons, their forces were gradually pushed back by troops under General Abramov. Abdumalik To’ra fled to the Khiva Khanate and later to Afghanistan, eventually reaching Peshawar, where he died in 1909.

Thus, the second phase of Russian conquest in Central Asia ended with the capture of Samarkand and the establishment of the Bukhara Emirate as a Russian protectorate. In 1873, a new treaty gave Russia the right to appoint a representative in the Emirate, effectively controlling all internal and external political matters. Article 14 stipulated: “No person shall be received by the Bukhara government without permission from the Russian government.” The representative would deliver instructions to the Emir daily, who would formally approve them. Pavel Lessar became the first Russian representative in Bukhara.

The representative, effectively Bukhara’s unofficial governor, headquartered in Kogon, 15 km from Bukhara. This allowed the Tsarist government to control the Emirate through the Emir and his officials without fully incorporating it into the empire. Between 1869–1870, the Russian Foreign Ministry negotiated with Britain to define borders in Afghanistan and Central Asia, resulting in the delimitation of the Amu Darya border along the Panj region. The border between Bukhara and Persia was set on December 10, 1881, through a secret treaty signed by the Russian ambassador in Tehran and the Shah of Persia. Later negotiations (1885–1887) by an Anglo-Russian commission finalized the border between the Bukhara Emirate and Afghanistan.

== See also ==
- Russian conquest of Central Asia
- Bukhara slave trade
