= Alexander Konstantinovich Abramov =

Russian general (1836–1886)

- Александр Константинович Абрамов
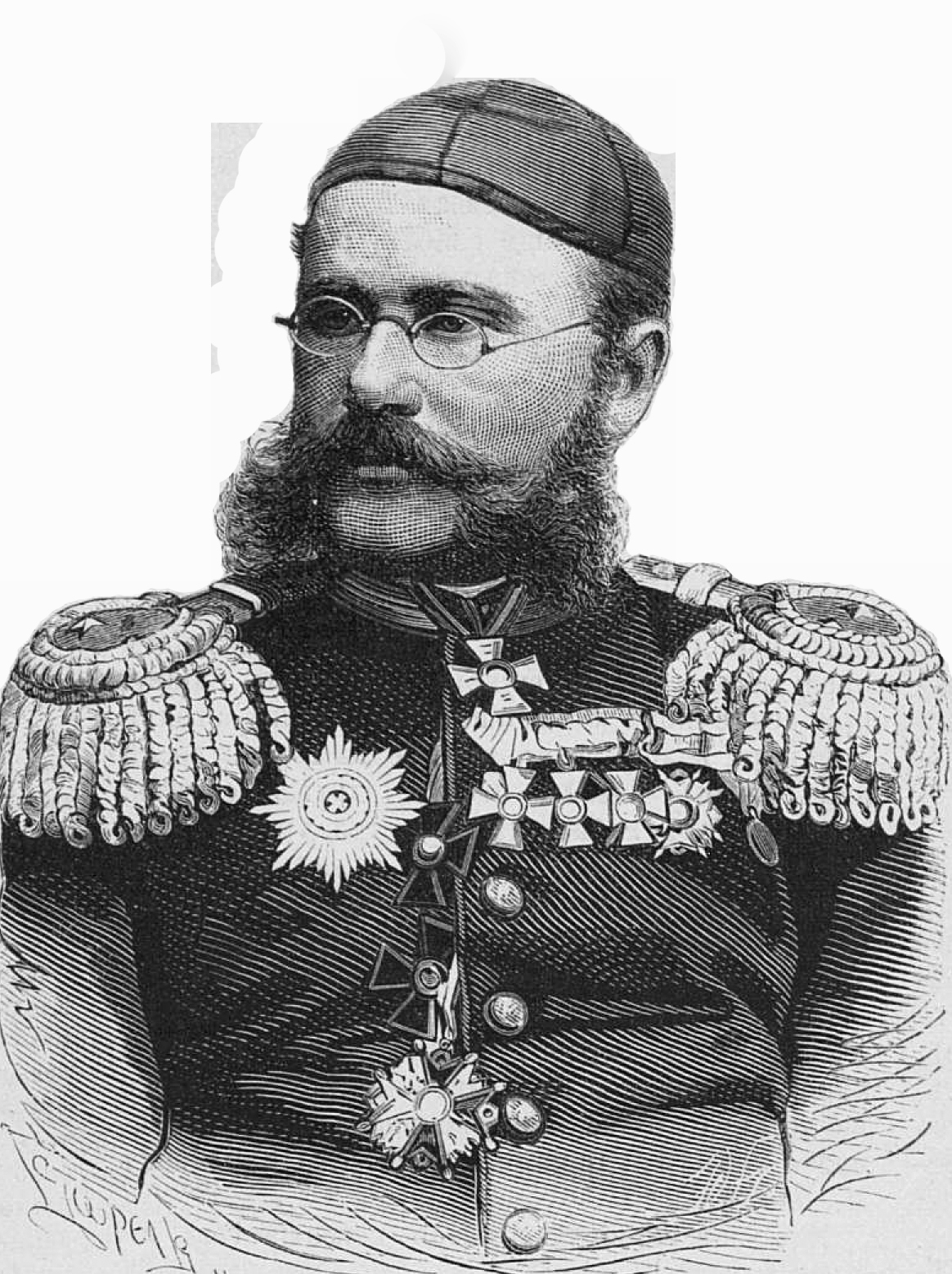
- Major general A.K. Abramov, Commander of Zeravshan District
- Born: 1836
- Died: 1886 (aged 49–50)
- Military career
- Allegiance: Russian
- Major general
- Commands: 13th Infantry Division (Russian Empire)

Alexander Konstantinovich Abramov (Russian: Алекса́ндр Константи́нович Абра́мов) (1836–1886) was a Russian major general. Serving under general Mikhail Chernyayev during the time of Russia's conquest of Central Asia, Abramov is perhaps best known for taking part in the 1865 Siege of Tashkent and the 1868 Siege of Samarkand. He led a joint military and scientific expedition to explore the upper reaches of the Zarafshon river in 1870.

Following the capture of Samarkand, General Abramov forcibly removed the Samarkand codex of the Quran of Uthman from the madrassa of Khoja Ahrar, despite the local ulama's attempt to prevent this by evacuating the manuscript to Bukhara, and sent it to the Imperial Library in Saint Petersburg (now the Russian National Library). In a manner typical of European colonists in the nineteenth century, Abramov and Konstantin Petrovich von Kaufmann, the first Governor-General of Russian Turkestan, claimed that the present-day inhabitants of Samarkand did not value the Quran nor understand its extreme rarity and antiquity, while Russian newspapers celebrated the Quran's removal to Saint Petersburg as the salvation of a great "antiquity, invaluable to science."

Preceded by	Commander of the 13th Infantry Division (Russian Empire); May–October 1886	Succeeded by Mikhail Batyanov
