= Shock tactics =

All-out attack to break enemy lines

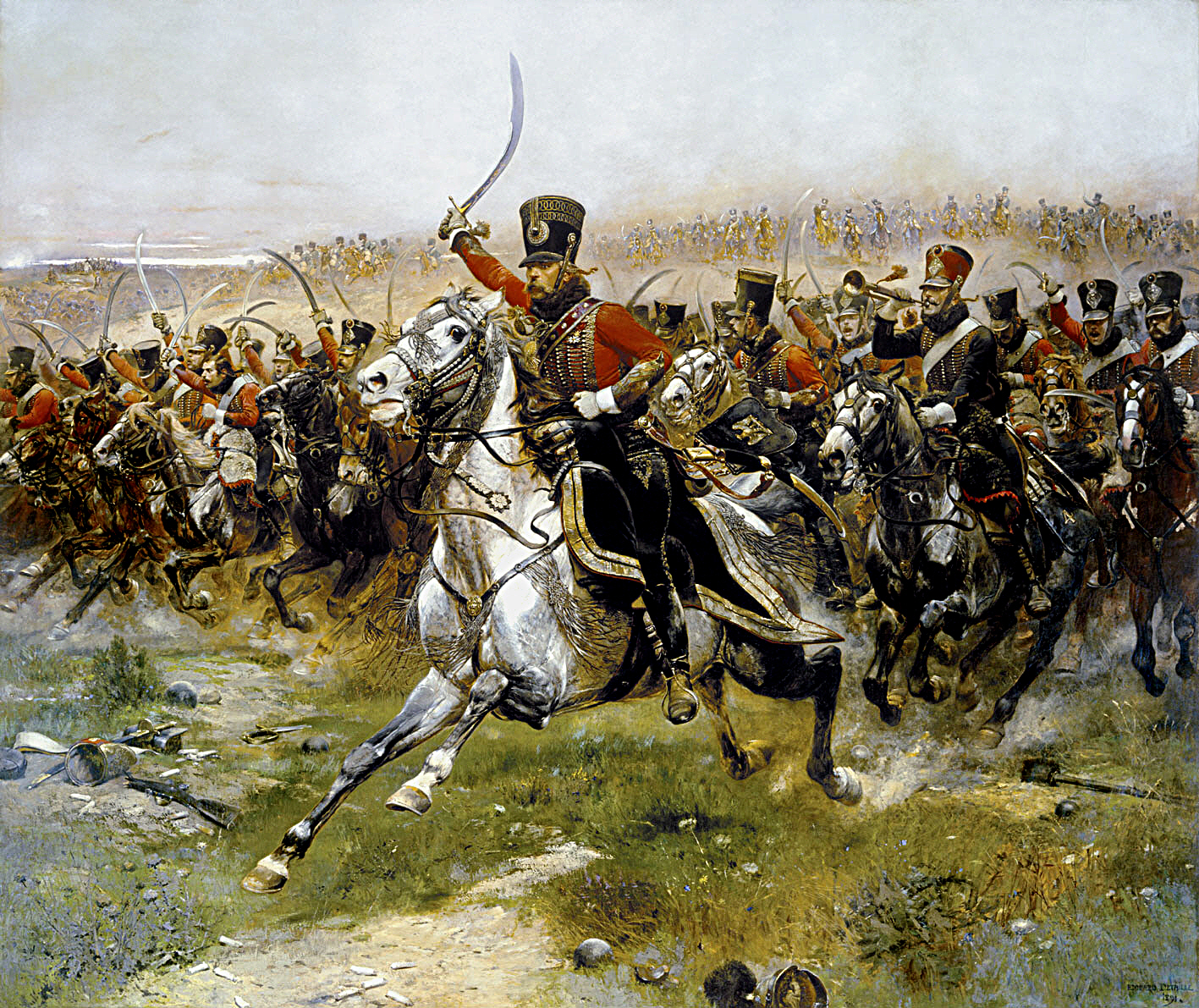
Attack of the French 4th Hussar Regiment at the Battle of Friedland, 14 June 1807

Shock tactics, shock tactic, or shock attack is an offensive maneuver which attempts to place the enemy under psychological pressure by a rapid and fully-committed advance with the aim of causing their combatants to retreat. The acceptance of a higher degree of risk to attain a decisive result is intrinsic to shock actions.

== Pre-modern ==
Shock tactics were usually performed by heavy cavalry, but were sometimes achieved by heavy infantry. The most famous shock tactic is the medieval cavalry charge. This shock attack was conducted by heavily armoured cavalry armed with lances, usually couched, galloping at full speed against an enemy infantry and/or cavalry formations.

== Modern ==
After the introduction of firearms, the use of the cavalry charge as a common military tactic waned. Infantry shock action required the holding of fire until the enemy was in very close range, and was used in defence as well as attack. The favorite tactic of the Duke of Wellington was for the infantry to fire a volley and then give a loud cheer and charge. During the Second Italian War of Independence, the French Army used shock tactics to overcome the superior range of the Austrian Lorenz rifle, quickly closing into enemy lines with bayonet charges sending battalions—each one with 100 troops, six soldiers deep—making use of loose line formations and taking advantage of the Lorenz curved trajectory to minimize casualties. The Austrians emulated these tactics against the Prussians during the Austro-Prussian War, but without success. The use of Stoßtaktiks negated the Lorenz range and muzzle velocity advantages over the Dreyse needle gun used by the Prussian Army.

The increasing firepower of machine guns, mortars, and artillery made this tactic increasingly hazardous. World War I saw the infantry charge at its worst, when masses of soldiers made frontal, and often disastrous, attacks on entrenched enemy positions.

Shock tactics began to be viable again with the invention of tanks and airplanes. During World War II, the Germans adapted shock tactics to modern mechanized warfare, known as blitzkrieg, which gained considerable achievements during the war and was afterwards adopted by most modern armies.

The United States tactic of shock and awe during the Second Gulf War was a shock tactic based on overwhelming military superiority on land and unchallenged dominance in naval and aerial warfare.

== Famous examples ==
- The charge of the Polish cavalry (September 12, 1683) at the Battle of Vienna in the Great Turkish War.
- Charge of the Light Brigade (October 25, 1854) at the Battle of Balaklava in the Crimean War.
- Pickett's Charge (July 3, 1863) at the Battle of Gettysburg in the American Civil War.
- Charge of the 21st Lancers (September 2, 1898) at the Battle of Omdurman in the Mahdist War: the last cavalry charge in battle by a British cavalry unit.
- Battle of Beersheba (October 31, 1917) in World War I: one of the last successful British cavalry charges in history.
- Charge at Krojanty (September 1, 1939) in World War II: a cavalry charge that gave birth to the myth of Polish cavalry charging German armoured vehicles.

== Shock units ==
=== Cavalry ===
- Hetairoi
- Cataphracts
- Clibanarii
- Polish Hussars
- Carabiniers
- Cuirassiers
- Lancers
- Knights
- Gendarme

=== Infantry ===
- Phalanx
- Hoplites
- Caroleans

=== Mechanized ===
- Tank
- Airplane

== See also ==
- Cavalry tactics
- Charge (warfare)
- Close combat
- Close quarters battle
- List of military tactics
- Melee
- Military doctrine
- Military history
- Shock units
- Special forces
