= Battle of Irjar =

1866 battle of the Russo-Bukharan war

- Part of the Russo-Bukharan and Russo-Kokand Wars
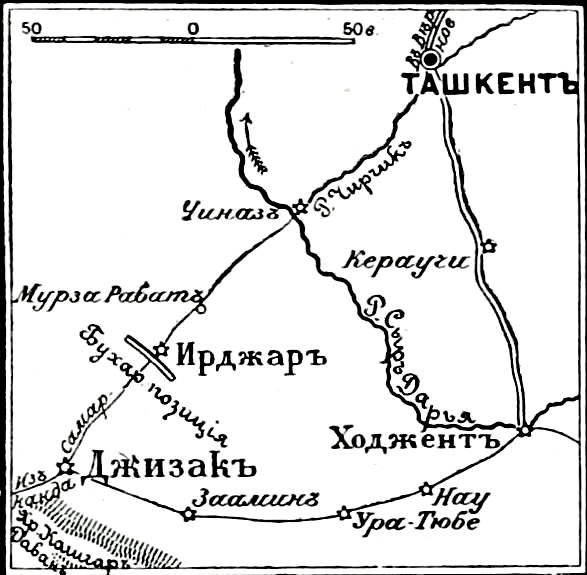
- Theater of military operations
| Date | May 20, 1866 |
| Location | Irjar, a pass on the Syr Darya river, between Chinoz and Khujand |
| Result | Russian victory |

Belligerents
| Russian Empire | Emirate of Bukhara |

Commanders and leaders
| (Russian Empire) Dmitry Romanovsky | (Emirate of Bukhara) Muzaffar bin Nasrullah |

Strength
| 3,000 men: 14 infantry battalions; 5 Cossack Sotnias; 8 rocket launchers 20 guns | approx 40,000 men: 5,000 sarbaz; 35,000 horsemen |

Casualties and losses
| 120 wounded | 200 killed 10 cannons captured |

The Battle of Irjar was a battle between the Russian Empire and the Emirate of Bukhara on May 20, 1866, near Irjar, a narrow pass on the left bank of the Syr Darya river, between Chinoz and Khujand. It was fought between a Russian contingent commanded by Major Romanovsky against the Bukharans of Muzaffar bin Nasrullah.

== Background ==
In the mid-1800s, Russia conquered territory in Central Asia to establish a secure, productive border with the Central Asian states to the south. While this territory was secured by 1865, in 1866 war reignited with the neighboring Emirate of Bukhara after several disputes including the detaining of the Russian embassy. Military Governor of Orenburg Dmitry Romanovsky was ordered to maintain peaceful relations with Bukhara, he believed Russian forces needed to dislodge Bukharan troops in Irjar. However, a lack of funds and men forced him to delay the attack by a month.

In late March, Bukhara constructed a bridge across the Syr Darya near Irjar, a narrow pass between the Bukharan city of Khujand, and the Russian controlled city of Chinoz. Russian spies estimated that 100,000 Bukharan troops had gathered in the region, though Romanovsky estimated the troops to be about 35,000 cavalry and 5,000 sarbaz infantry.

On May 19, a Russian detachment under the command of Dmitry Romanovsky} departed Chinoz with an army of 3,000 men, compeised of 14 infantry battalions, 5 Sotnias of Cossacks, and 20 guns and rocket launchers. They marched to Irjar, accompanied by the steamship Perovsky, which carried critical supplies for the expedition along the Syr Darya.

== Battle ==
At the end of the first 30 versts (20 miles) march to the Murza-Rabat wells, when there were still about 20 versts (13 miles) left to Irjar and, at dawn, the Cossacks shot down the first groups of Bukhara cavalry that appeared; the artillery also began to operate, and did not cease firing from that moment until the very end of the battle.

At the head of the Russian column moved Captain Alexander Konstantinovich Abramov with 6 battalions and 8 guns. On the right went Lieutenant Colonel Alexander Pistolkors with Cossacks, rocket launchers and 6 guns. Behind moved a reserve of 3 battalions with 4 guns of Major Pishchemuki and a convoy with cover.

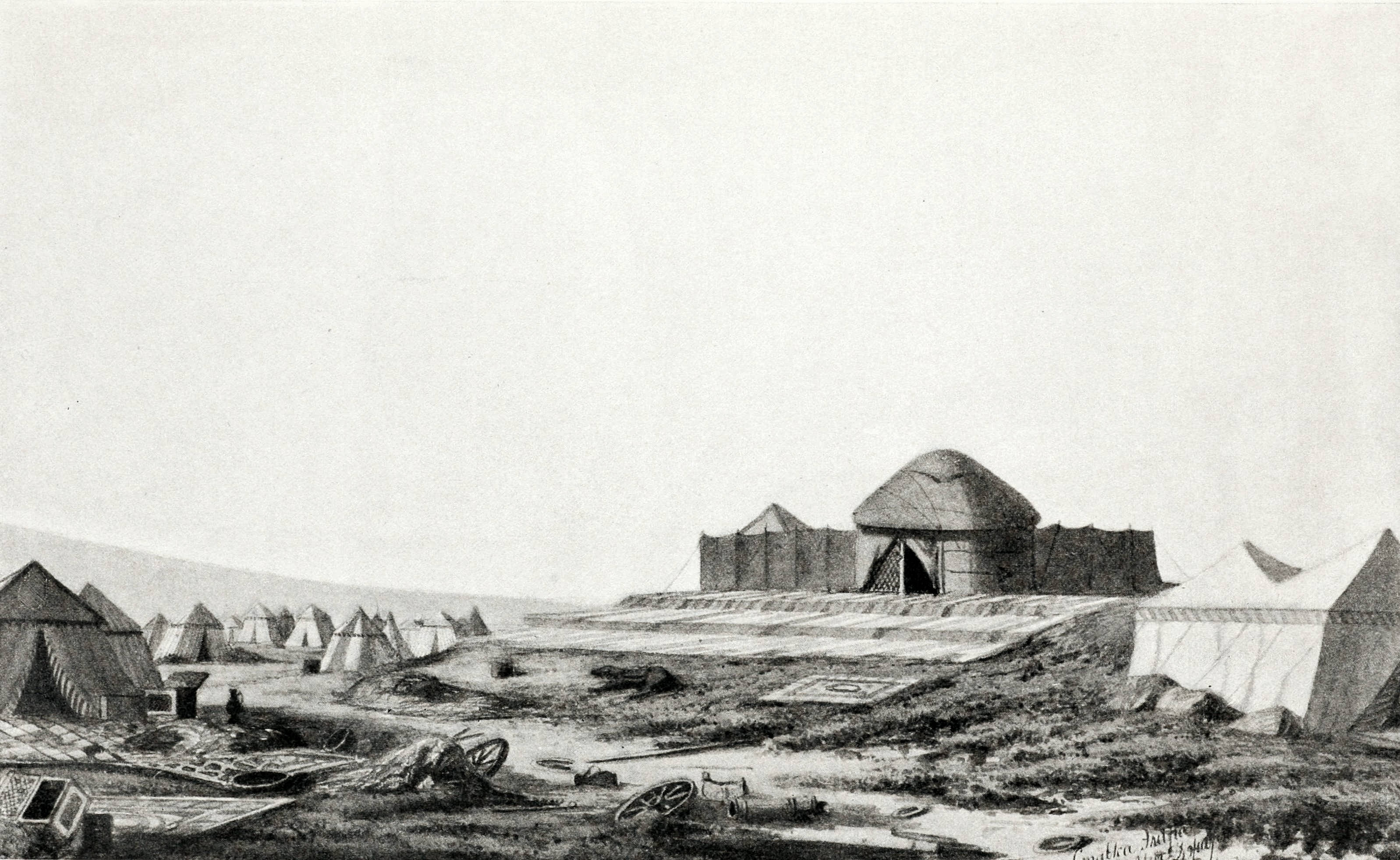
Abandoned headquarters of the emir at Irjar (from a watercolor by General Romanovsky).

On May 20, the Bukharan army attacked the Russian detachment: mounted crowds of Bukharans and Kirghiz surrounded it from all sides, especially pressing hard on the baggage train of Lieutenant Colonel Fovitsky.

A mile and a half before the Bukhara positions, the Russian detachment was met with intense cannon fire from the trenches. However, the Russian columns were able to force their way through the mass of Bukhara cavalry, which continued its attacks. About an hour later, the Bukhara onslaught weakened, and the Russian columns counterattacked: Abramov's units moved toward the rubble and captured it within half an hour. Pistolkors also distinguished himself, quickly occupying one enemy position after another. During the battle, the Bukhara army was defeated and, after unsuccessful attempts to counterattack, fled to its own territory, suffering significant losses. Those Bukhara who tried to escape to the right bank of the Syr Darya came under attack from the Keleuchin detachment.

Emir Muzaffar bin Nasrullah himself provoked his army to flee, fleeing to Samarkand. The huge camp of the Bukharans fell into the hands of the Russians along with all their property. The next day, the Russians took another camp (the emir's headquarters) where their trophies included carpets, sofas, the khan's kitchen, and a report from the Samarkand bek from the front that "the Russians are already surrounded and will soon all be captured".

The Bukhara tents were dismantled by Russian soldiers for shirts, and subsequently, throughout the entire campaign, one could see shirts on them, half made of blue, half of red or green material, with bizarre dragons or birds.

== Aftermath ==
Despite their numbers, the Bukharans suffered a complete defeat, losing about 200 people killed, while the Russians had only 120 wounded. The Russian detachment's trophies included 10 cannons, supplies of gunpowder, cartridges, and shells.

The victory at Irjar opened the way for the Russian army to Khujand, the fortress of Nau, and Jizzakh, which covered access to the Fergana Valley (Romanovsky did not pursue Muzaffar, who fled to Samarkand), which were taken following the victory at Irjar.

Emir Muzaffar, having arrived in Bukhara, was met by a crowd hostile to him, blaming him for the defeat. The ulama demanded the start of the war, Muzaffar hesitated and did not dare to do so. Then, at a general council, the ulama spoke out openly against the emir and declared him unworthy of occupying the throne of the "great Timur". Having left the capital, the emir hoped to find support among the people, but this did not happen, and in the end he had no choice but to declare a gazavat alone (even despite the refusal of support from Khiva, Kokand and Afghanistan, which at the last moment abandoned the confrontation with the Russian Empire).

== Sources ==
- Abaza, Konstantin K. (2008). The Conquest of Turkestan. Kuchkovo Pole. ISBN 978-5-901679-99-9.
- Glushchenko, E. A. (2010). Russia in Central Asia. Conquests and transformations. ZAO Izdatelstvo Tsentrpoligraf. ISBN 978-5-227-02167-0.
- Morrison, Alexander (2021). The Russian Conquest of Central Asia: A Study in Imperial Expansion, 1814–1914. Cambridge: Cambridge University Press. ISBN 978-1-107-03030-5.
