= Battle of Zerabulak =

1868 battle, Russian conquest of Central Asia

- Part of the Russo-Bukharan War
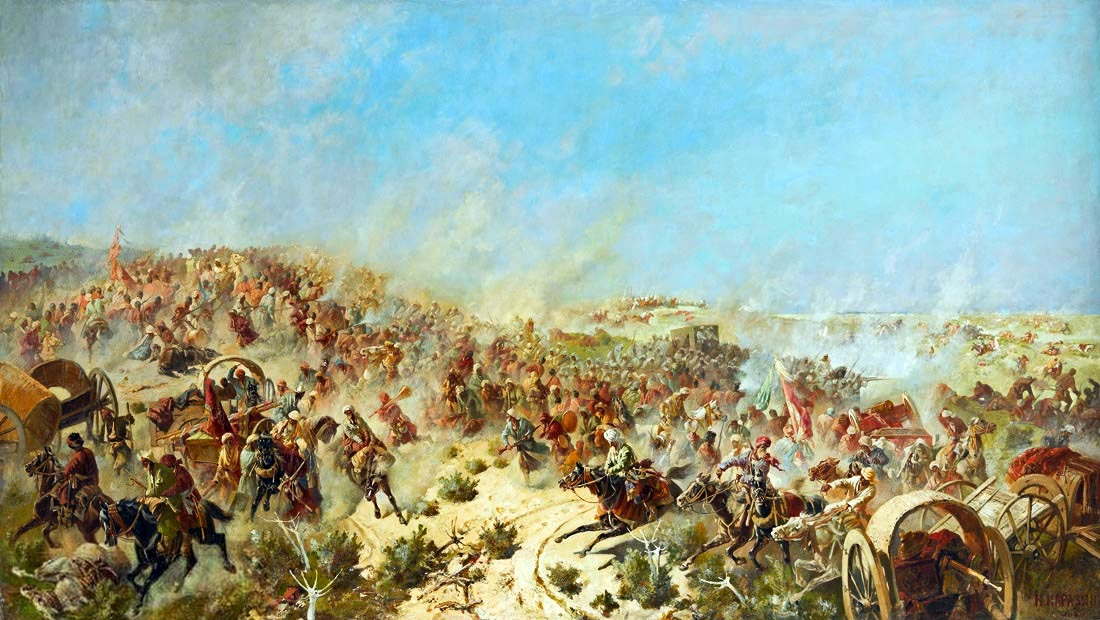
- Nikolay Karazin. Battle on Zerabulak Heights
Date	14 June 1868
Location	Zera-tau ridge, Bukhara (now Uzbekistan)
Result	Russian victory
Territorial changes	Bukhara becomes Russian vassal

Belligerents
Russia	Bukhara

Commanders and leaders
Konstantin Kaufmann	Emir Muzaffar

Strength
2,020 soldiers including 320 Cossacks; 14 guns 6 rocket launchers	30,000; unknown number of artillery

Casualties and losses
63 killed 38 wounded	3,500–10,000 killed or wounded in battle (Note: ~29,000 in total)

The battle on the Zerabulak heights is the decisive battle of the Russian army under the command of General Kaufman with the army of the Bukhara emir Muzaffar, which took place in June 1868, on the slopes of the Zera-tau mountain range, between Samarkand and Bukhara. It ended with the defeat of the Bukhara army, and the transition of the Bukhara Emirate to vassal dependence on the Russian Empire. Battle of Zerabulak is the first time that the Carle rifle was used in action.

== Battle ==
After the capture of Samarkand in May 1868 by General Kaufman, in order to finally defeat the Bukharians, a campaign was undertaken in the direction of Bukhara.

In the meantime, it became known that a large Bukhara army was gathering at the Zerabulak heights, located about half the way from Samarkand to Bukhara. According to intelligence, there were about 30,000 people in it. Having received such news, General Kaufman, leaving a small garrison in Samarkand, decided to advance with the main forces to meet the enemy.

On the night of June 14, 1868, the Russian detachment approached the Zerabulak heights. At their feet stood the Bukhara infantry, behind it, on a hill — 14 guns and a mass of cavalry. The battle began at 4 am. Colonel Alexander Pistolkors, who commanded the vanguard, led his soldiers to attack the enemy's left flank. At the same time, the Cossacks moved, and the artillery began firing buckshot at the enemy infantry. The people of Bukhara, not expecting such pressure, wavered and ran. The Cossacks rushed in pursuit, but the Bukhara infantry, as soon as it emerged from the grapple fire, again lined up and began to retreat in an orderly manner, firing back and defending itself according to all the rules. Nevertheless, the entire hollow along which they retreated was covered with the bodies of Bukhara soldiers.

On the right flank, a battalion of 280 Russian infantrymen who had gone into hand-to-hand combat was unexpectedly surrounded by the Bukharians: enemy infantry was pressing in front, and cavalry came in from the rear. There was no way to help them, but, suddenly rushing into a bayonet attack, Russian soldiers overturned the enemy and got rid of the encirclement themselves, losing only 17 people wounded.

The entire Bukhara army gradually began to retreat, at first in order, and then — throwing weapons and ammunition. By 10 o'clock in the morning everything was over, the heights were cleared of the enemy. Among the trophies of General Kaufman's detachment was an artillery gun and 40 pack boxes with shells.

== Gallery ==
The heights of Zerabulak, the battlefield where Emir's regular army was defeated on 14 June 1868. Photo taken by Mikhail Terentyev between 1871-1872.

The kishlack (village) of Zerabulak located near the battlefield. Photo taken by Mikhail Terentyev between 1871-1872.

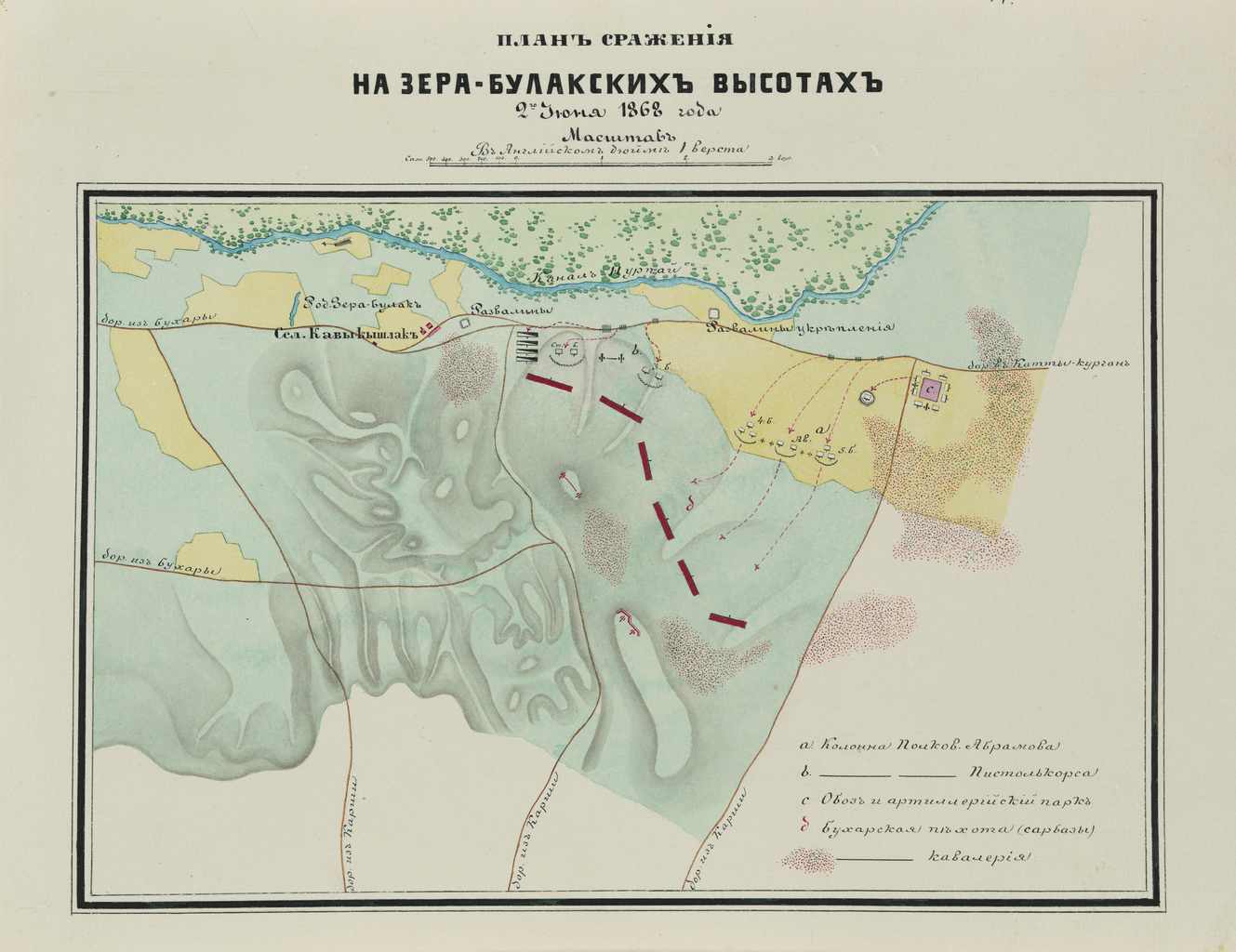
Battle map of the engagement.
