= Kokand Jami Mosque =

Mosque in Kokand, Fergana, Uzbekistan

- Qoʻqon jome masjidi
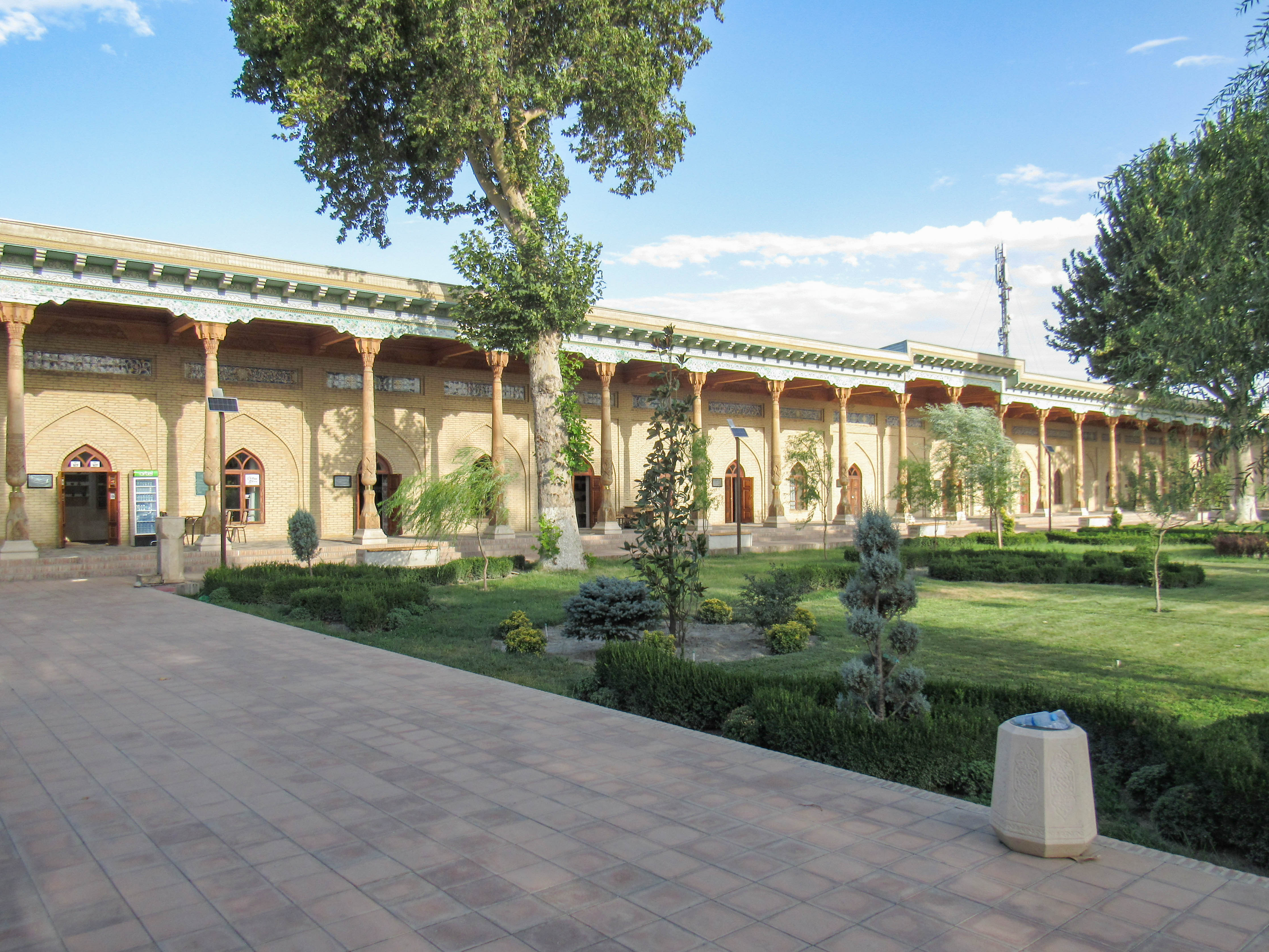
- Interactive map of the Kokand Jami Mosque area

General information
- Status: Active
- Type: Mosque
- Architectural style: Islamic
- Location: Chorsu Square, Kokand, Kokand, Uzbekistan
- Coordinates: 40.5327°N 70.9493°E
- Year built: 1819-1822
- Renovated: 1913
- Affiliation: Islam

Technical details
- Material: Wood, brick, ganch

The Kokand Jami Mosque (Uzbek: Qoʻqon jome masjidi) is an architectural monument located on Chorsu Square in Kokand, Fergana Region, Uzbekistan. It was built in 1819-1822 by the order of the Kokand ruler Umar Khan. The complex consists of a mosque, a madrasa, a prayer hall, a minaret and a khanqah.

It is currently on the list of material cultural heritage of Uzbekistan of republican significance.

== History ==
In 1805, by the order of the Kokand ruler Alim Khan, the construction of the cathedral mosque in Kokand began, but it was stopped. In 1819, the next ruler of the Kokand Khanate - Umar Khan resumed the construction of the Kokand Jami Mosque. The construction was led by a famous architect from Ura-Tyube. Under his supervision, 200 builders worked. Two years later, the Kokand Jami Mosque was built.

The Kokand Jami Mosque has a large courtyard. In the western part of the courtyard of the mosque there is a large veranda (the area is 97.5 x 25.5 meters), the roof of which is supported by 98 columns, as well as a khanaka. The columns of the veranda are a work of art, they are finely painted with colors with the addition of gold. The khanaka is built with a high painted ceiling. In the center of the courtyard, a minaret 22.5 meters high was built. The stone minaret with a smooth ring masonry of burnt brick and six arched lantern, which is crowned with a faceted dome. However, the minaret is not decorated with additional patterns. A spiral staircase leads to the top of the minaret.

The walls of the mosque still preserve the ganch carving, which is unique for the Fergana Valley. Along the perimeter of the courtyard there were hudjras (study classes), since a madrasa operated at the mosque.

The madrasa operated until 1918, the mosque until 1930.
