= Irdana Biy =

Irdana Khan
- Khan of Kokand
- Reign: c. 1750 — 1764
- Predecessor: Abdurakhman-Batir
- Successor: Suleiman Bey
- Born: c. 1720; Kokand
- Died: c. 1770; Kokand
- Father: Abdul Rahim Bey
- Religion: Sunni Islam

Irdana Khan was the Khan of Kokand from 1750 to 1764. He was the son of Abd al-Rahim Biy and the nephew of Abdul Karim Biy.

== Rise to power ==
After the death of Abdul Karim Biy in 1750, Erdeni was made the Khan of Kokand after slaying Abdurakhman-Batir and all of his family in Kokand except his young son Narbuta who was visiting his grandmother. After another prolonged power struggle that lasted roughly ten months between 1752 and 1753, in which Bobobek seized power and held the title of Khan, Irdana took back the title of Khan and removed Bobobek from office.

== Policies as Khan ==
Irdana Biy took active measures to expand the borders of the Khanate, briefly annexing the land of Ura-Tyube long coveted by the Khanate; Ura-Tyube ended up changing hands multiple times to and from Kokand throughout the 18th and 19th centuries. On his second attempt to annex Ura-Tyube he was more successful in capturing the territory, brutalizing prisoners of war by chopping off their heads and constructing a tower out of their heads.

After various wars in attempts to expand the Khanate and Irdana's use of the title Khan instead of Bek, the Qing began to demand tribute from Kokand in the form of livestock and people; the Qing had informed the Khan of the Kazakh Middle Horde that they intended to take over Samarkand and most of Turkestan. When Irdana was informed of the plan of the Qing to take over most of Central Asia, he managed to unite the previously warring militaries of an Afghan monarch, several Kyrgyz biys and well as those of Khujand, Ura-Tyube on the premise of saving the Islamic world from takeover. The alliance, however brief, managed to prevent Qing takeover.
