= Nodira =

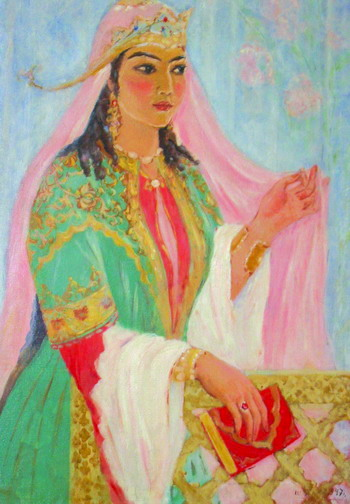
- Painting of Nodira by Shamsroi Khasanova, dated 1945
- Born: Mahlar-ayim; 1792 Andijan, Khanate of Kokand
- Died: 1842 (aged 49–50) Kokand, Khanate of Kokand
- Resting place: Kokand
- Occupation: Poet
- Language: Chagatai Turkic; Persian
- Spouse: Muhammad Umar Khan
- Children: Muhammad Ali Khan; Sultan-Mahmud

Nodira (also spelled Nadira; 1792–1842) was a poet in the Khanate of Kokand, who wrote in Chagatai Turkic and Persian.

== Biography ==
Mahlar-ayim was her birth name. Nadera was her pen name, which she used along with Kamila in her Chagatai poems. In her Persian poems, she wrote under the pen name Maknuna.

She was born in Andijan, which was governed by her father Rahmanqulibi, who was the uncle of the sixth ruler of Kokand, Alim Khan of Kokand (r. 1801–1810). In 1808, Nodira was married to Alim Khan's brother Muhammad Umar Khan, whom she had two children with, Muhammad Ali Khan and Sultan-Mahmud. In 1810, Muhammad Ali Khan had Alim Khan murdered, subsequently becoming the new ruler of Kokand.

After his death in 1822, Nodira played an important role in court politics and state affairs during the reign of her son Muhammad Ali Khan. She also promoted cultural and social development, sponsoring mosques, madrasas, and bazaars. In 1842, after the capital Kokand was captured by the Emirate of Bukhara, its ruler had Nodira and her sons executed.

She taught the works of authors such as Ali-Shir Nava'i, Fuzuli and Abd al-Qadir Bedil. According to the modern historian Scott C. Levi, "The most famous of Khoqand’s women poets was Nadira". Her writings, numbering nearly 10,000 verses, include a divan (collection of poetry) featuring 136 poems in Chaghatai and 44 in Persian. Among the prominent poetesses Nodira would bring together at Kokand's court were Jahonotin Uvaysiy, Mahzuna, and Dilshad Barna.

== Sources ==
- Grassi, Evelin (2020). "Nādera". In Yarshater, Ehsan (ed.). Encyclopædia Iranica (Online ed.). Brill.
- Levi, Scott C. (2017). The Rise and Fall of Khoqand, 1709 – 1876: Central Asia in the Global Age. University of Pittsburgh.
