= Dilshad Barna =

Central Asian poet (1800–1905)

- Born: 1800 Urateppe
- Died: 1905 (aged 104 or 105) Kokand, Russian Empire
- Occupation: Poet, historian, teacher
- Language: Persian; Chaghatai Turkic
- Notable works: Tarikh-i muhajiran

Dilshad Barna (1800–1905) was a Central Asian poet, historian and teacher, who wrote in Persian and Chaghatai Turkic. Born in Urateppe, she lived the majority of her life in Kokand.

== Biography ==
She was born in 1800 at Urateppe (present-day northern Tajikistan) to a lower-class Persian-speaking family. The town was a focal point of almost constant fighting between the Khanate of Kokand and the Emirate of Bukhara. During her childhood, both of her parents died. In 1818, the Muhammad Umar Khan (r. 1811–1822) had the inhabitants of Urateppe massacred, and had several thousand of them—including Dilshad—taken captive to the Fergana Valley.

At that time, the Kokand court of Muhammad Umar Khan and his wife Nodira, both poets, was a thriving center of the Kokand khanate's cultural and literary life, where they actively promoted social and cultural activities. Since surviving sources provide no evidence that Dilshad was connected to the female literary community of the Kokand court, which was dominated by Nodira and active in poetry in both Persian and Chaghatai Turkic, she was likely not a court poet.

After marrying Tash Makhdum in 1820, Dilshad began teaching at her mother-in-law's girls' school in Kokand's Khwaja Kalan neighborhood. Since Dilshad could only speak Persian before coming to Kokand, it was her mother-in-law who introduced her to the Chaghatai language and literature. In 1830, Dilshad opened a school for girls, where she focused on teaching them to read and write. Over a teaching career that spanned fifty years, she instructed a total of 891 girls. By 1876, the Khanate of Kokand had been conquered by the Russian Empire. Dilshad died in 1905 in Kokand.

Writing with the pen name of "Barna", two of Dilshad's works are preserved today: a divan (collection of poems) featuring poems in both Persian and Chaghatai, and a prose treatise written in Persian named Tarikh-i muhajiran ("History of the migrants"). Her divan, titled Muntakhab al-ash'ar-e Barna, includes 14 Persian ghazals and, in Chaghatai, 35 ghazals, 13 mukhammases, a single musaddas, and one masnavi. It also features a bilingual poem from 1903/04 written with the literary technique shir o shakar.

== Sources ==
- Grassi, Evelin (2014). "Delšād Barnā". In Yarshater, Ehsan (ed.). Encyclopædia Iranica (Online ed.). Encyclopædia Iranica Foundation. ISBN 978-1-56859-028-8.
- Lambert-Hurley, Siobhan; Majchrowicz, Daniel; Sharma, Sunil (2022). Three Centuries of Travel Writing by Muslim Women. Indiana University Press. ISBN 978-0253062390.
- Levi, Scott C. (2017). The Rise and Fall of Khoqand, 1709 – 1876: Central Asia in the Global Age. University of Pittsburgh. ISBN 978-0822965060.
- Levi, Scott C.; Beisembiev, T. (2023). "Kokand Khanate". In Yarshater, Ehsan (ed.). Encyclopædia Iranica (Online ed.). Brill.
