= Uzbek khanates =

Historical states in Central Asia

Uzbek khanates (Uzbek: Oʻzbek xonliklari) is a general name for the states that were ruled by Uzbek dynasties, and mostly refers to three states that existed in Transoxiana (modern-day Uzbekistan), namely the khanates of Bukhara (1500–1920), Khiva (1512–1920), and Kokand (c. 1710–1876).

== History ==
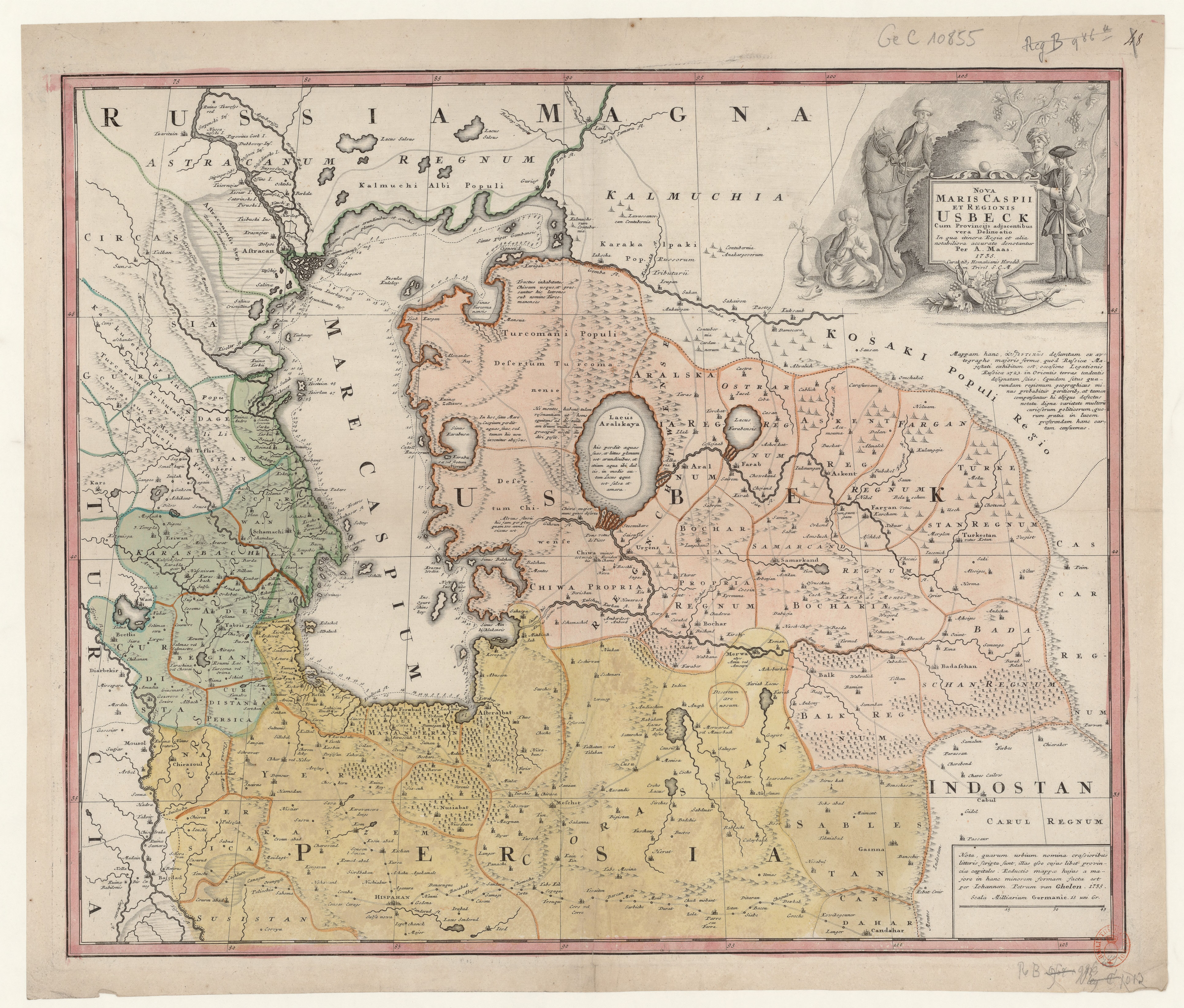
Map of Uzbek states in 1735

In the late 15th and early 16th century, the Timurids, who ruled in Transoxiana, were replaced by the Uzbek Shaybanid dynasty. Two branches of this dynasty established themselves as rulers of the khanates of Bukhara (1500) and Khiva (1512).

In 1599, power over the Khanate of Bukhara passed to the Ashtrakhanid dynasty. Later, around 1710, the Khanate of Kokand was formed, being nominally dependent on the Khanate of Bukhara.

In 1747, control over Bukhara passed to the Mangit dynasty, under whom it became known as the Emirate of Bukhara.

In 1804, power over Khiva passed to the Kungrad dynasty.

In the 1860s and 1870s, the entire territory of the Uzbek khanates was subordinated to the Russian Empire. In 1876, Kokand was incorporated into the Russian Empire as Fergana Oblast, while Bukhara and Khiva became Russian vassal states.

They ceased to exist after the October Revolution, in 1920, becoming the Bukharan People's Soviet Republic and the Khorezm People's Soviet Republic, respectively.

The Uzbek khanates in contemporary northern Afghanistan, namely khanates of Kunduz, Maimana, Badakhshan, Balkh and various others, were annexed by Emirate of Afghanistan in the later half of 19th century as Afghan Turkestan.

== List of Uzbek states and dynasties ==
- Khanate of Bukhara (Abulkhayrid branch of the Shaybanid dynasty)
- Khanate of Khiva (Arabshahid branch of the Shaybanid dynasty)
- Khanate of Bukhara (Tuqay-Timurid dynasty)
- Khanate of Khiva (Qungrat dynasty)
- Khanate of Kokand (Ming dynasty)
- Khanate of Yettishar (Kokandi Andijani Uzbek state)
- Khanate of Tashkent (Khwaja dynasty)
- Emirate of Bukhara (Manghit dynasty)
- Khanate of Qunduz (Qataghan dynasty)
- Khanate of Maimana (Ming dynasty)
- Khanate of Badakhshan (Yarid dynasty)
- Khanate of Balkh (Shaybanid dynasty; under influence of Bukhara)
