= Shahrukh of Kokand =

Shahrukh Bek
- Khan of Kokand
- Reign: c. 1709 — 1722
- Predecessor: none
- Successor: Abd al-Rahim Biy
- Born: c. 1680; Kokand
- Died: c. 1722; Kokand
- Religion: Sunni Islam

Shahrukh Bek, (Note: Chagatai and Persian: شاهرخ بیگ) later referred to as Shahrukh Khan (Note: Chagatai and Persian: شاهرخ خان) was the leader of the Kokand Khanate and Uzbek Mings tribe from c. 1709 to c. 1721.

As the first ruler of the independent Kokand Khanate after separation from Bukhara, he ordered nobles to have a fortified castle constructed in the region. Before his death, reported to be around 1721 (Note: Some sources report his year of death to be 1722, not 1721.) the new khanate acquired the cities of Margilan, Namangan, and Isfara in addition to the new capital Kokand.

His oldest son, Abd al-Rahim Biy, took over the Khanate after his death.
