= Alim Khan =

Alim Khan may refer to:

- Alim Khan of Kokand (c. 1774 – c. 1810), Khan of Kokand 1801–1810
- Sayyid Mir Muhammad Alim Khan (1880–1944), last emir of the Manghud dynasty 1911–1920
