= Narbuta Bek =

- Khan of Kokand
- Reign: c. 1764–1801
- Predecessor: Shahruhk Bek
- Successor: Alim Khan
- Born: c. 1749; Kokand
- Died: c. 1801; Tashkent
- Religion: Islam

Narbuta Bek (Note: Chagatai and Persian: نربوته بیگ) was the Khan of Kokand from c. 1764 to 1801. He was the grandson of Abdul Karim Bek his only successor of not killed by Irdana Bek in a coup for power. He had three sons: Alim, Umar, and Shahrukh. His son Alim succeeded him as khan until he was overthrown by Umar.

== Rise to Power ==
When Irdana Khan died in 1764, Sulayman Bek took over but only reigned or a few months, followed by Shahrukh Bek, after which Narbuta was handed power at the age of 14. Records indicate that Narbuta long refused to accept power but eventually caved in to pressure from nobility and representatives of Kokand.

== Domestic Policy ==
Under the reign of Narbuta there was substantial immigration to Kokand due to the economic stability and prosperity in the Khanate. Falus (copper coins) of the smallest denomination issued in Kokand were used during his reign. No internal uprisings occurred against the Khanate.

== Foreign Policy ==
Narbuta attempted to conquer and annex Tashkent on multiple occasions but failed, but was able to conquer the cities of Andijan, Namangan, Ush, and Margilan. Khujand changed hands several times between Kokand and other empires but was never fully annexed to Kokand.
Diplomatic relations were also maintained with the Qing dynasty from the year 1774 until his death, with the Chinese recognizing him as Khan.
The Khanate saw itself competing with the Emirate of Bukhara, except when trying to annex Ura-Tepé. When the armies of Kokand and Bukhara attempted to take over Ura-Tepé from its ruler Khudayar Bek, some 20,000 of their men were killed and their heads stacked into pyramids.
Relations with the Qing suffered, when the contraband trade in Fergana led to the Qing imposing sanctions on Kokandian merchants.

On his last expedition to Tashkent wherein he attempted to annex the city, he was captured by the army of Yunus Khoja and beheaded.
