= Uzbek =

Uzbek may refer to:

- Someone or something related to Uzbekistan
- Uzbeks, an ethnic group
- Uzbek language
- Uzbek national identity
- Uzbek cuisine
- Uzbek culture
- Uzbek Mosque, a Mosque located in Baghdad, Iraq

== People ==
- Ozbeg Khan (1282–1341), khan of the Golden Horde of the Mongol Empire
- Muzaffar al-Din Uzbek or Özbeg ibn Muhammad Pahlawan, last ruler of the Eldiguzids
- Khalil Khan Uzbek (1752–1755), the khan of the Erivan Khanate
- Viktor Uzbek (born 1990), Ukrainian footballer
