= Altun Bishik =

Altun Bishik (Altun Beshik, Altin Bishik, Altin Beshik) is a mythological figure through whom the Khanate of Kokand claimed descent from the Timurid dynasty.

The Khans of Kokand wished to legitimize their rule of the khanate through a connection with the Timurid dynasty (ruled 1370–1506). From the time of the last Timurids to that of the first Khans of Kokand there was a period of more than two hundred years. Faced with this situation, the Khans connected their genealogy with Babur through a legendary figure, “Altun Bishik”. In the legend, a baby of Babur's family was left in a bishik (cradle) when Babur fled prosecution, making for the limits of Transoxiana. The child was named Altun Bishik, after its imperial cradle, and in the legend he ostensibly lived from 918 AH/1512 CE – 952 AH/1545 CE. Even in historical sources, he has appeared as a historic figure. In the legend of this baby began the Khans of Kokand. The legend in various versions has resulted in manuscripts on Kokand historical writings, since the beginning of the 19th century. Despite it, Altun Bishik and the legend connected with him are not the historical truth.

== Bibliography ==
1. Beisembiev T. K. Kokandskaia istoriografiia: Issledovanie po istochnikovedeniiu Srednei Azii XVIII-XIX vekov. Almaty, TOO "PrintS", 2009, 1263 pp., ISBN 9965-482-84-5.
2. Beisembiev T. "Annotated indices to the Kokand Chronicles". Tokyo: Research Institute for Languages and Cultures of Asia and Africa, Tokyo University of Foreign Studies. Studia Culturae Islamica. № 91, 2008, 889 pp., ISBN 978-4-86337-001-2.
3. Beisembiev T.K. "Ta'rikh-i SHakhrukhi" kak istoricheskii istochnik. Alma Ata: Nauka, 1987. 200 p. Summaries in English and French
4. Beisembiev T.K. "Legenda o proiskhozhdenii kokandskikh khanov kak istochnik po istorii ideologii v Srednei Azii (na materialakh sochinenii kokandskoi istoriografii)". Kazakhstan, Srednjaja i Tsentralnaia Azia v XVI-XVIII vv. Alma-ata, 1983, pp. 94–105
5. Nalivkine V. P. Histoire du Khanat de Khokand. Trad. A.Dozon. Paris, 1889.
6. Nalivkin V. "Kratkaia istoria kokandskogo khanstva". Istoria Srednei Azii. A.I.Buldakov, S.A.Shumov, A.R.Andreev (eds.). Moskva, 2003, pp. 288–290.
7. Vakhidov Sh.Kh. XIX-ХХ asr bāshlarida Qoqān khānligida tarikhnavislikning rivājlanishi. Tarikh fanlari doktori dissertatsiyasi. Tāshkent, 1998, pp. 114–137.
8. Erkinov A. "Imitation of Timurids and Pseudo-Legitimation: On the origins of a manuscript anthology of poems dedicated to the Kokand ruler Muhammad Ali Khan (1822–1842)". (http://wcms-neu1.urz.uni-halle.de/download.php?down=9046&elem=1986852%5B‍%5D) GSAA Online Working Paper No. 5 [1]
9. Erkinov A. "Les timourides, modeles de legitimite et les recueils poetiques de Kokand". In: Ecrit et culture en Asie centrale et dans le monde Turko-Iranien, XIVe-XIXe siècles // Writing and Culture in Central Asia and in the Turko-Iranian World, 14th-19th Centuries. F.Richard, M.Szuppe (eds.), [Cahiers de Studia Iranica. 40]. Paris: AAEI, 2009, pp. 285–330.
10. Lal Ruby. Domesticity and Power in the Early Mughal World. Oxford, 2005, p. 113
11. Scott Levi. "Babur’s Legacy and Political Legitimacy in the Khanate of Khoqand." to be submitted to the Journal of Asian Studies. haris and binal
