= Muhammad Sharif Gulkhani =

Muhammad Sharif Gulkhani (1770s–1827), better simply known as Gulkhani (also one of his pen names), was a poet and satirist from Kokand. He was bilingual in Persian and Chagatai.

Not much is known about Gulkhani's life. He hailed from a farmer's family; his father's roots reportedly lay in what is present-day central Tajikistan. Gulkhani eventually became part of the retinue of Kokand's ruler Muhammad Umar Khan and his wife, who sponsored arts and culture within the Khanate of Kokand and were poets themselves.

== Sources ==
- Grassi, Evelin (2018). "GOLḴANI, MOḤAMMAD ŠARIF". In Yarshater, Ehsan (ed.). Encyclopædia Iranica (Online ed.). Encyclopædia Iranica Foundation.
- Kayumov, A. (2003). Adle, Chahryar; Habib, Irfan; Baipakov, Karl M. (eds.). History of Civilization of Central Asia: Volume V Development in Contrast: from the sixteenth to the mid-nineteenth century. Unesco Publishing. ISBN 978-9231038761.
