= Abd al-Rahim Biy =

- Khan of Kokand
- Reign: c. 1721 — 1733
- Predecessor: Shahrukh Bek
- Successor: Abd al-Karim Biy
- Born: c. 1697; Kokand
- Died: c. 1733; Kokand
- Religion: Sunni Islam

Abd al-Rahim Biy (Note: Chagatai and Persian: عبد الرحیم بیگ) (c. 1697-1733) - the second ruler from the Uzbek dynasty of Ming in the Kokand Khanate.

Abd al-Rahim Biy was the eldest son of Shahrukh Bek, who ascended the throne after the death of his father. During his reign, Khojent and Andijan became part of the Kokand Khanate. At first, Abd al-Rahim Biy tried to repair Khojent peacefully, but the ruler of the city of Akbutabiy from the Uzbek clan Yuz refused peace negotiations and soon died. Abd al-Rahim-biy was the first of the Uzbek rulers of the Ming clan to be called sahibqiran by historians, imitating Amir Timur.

Then Abd al-Rahim Biy tried to subjugate Samarkand and entered into an alliance with the rulers of Shakhrisabz from the Uzbek family of Kenagas. In 1732 they managed to capture Samarkand from Abdurakhim-biy.

Kokand finally became the capital of the state. A new fortress was built here and large-scale improvement works were carried out.

In 1733, as a result of a conspiracy, he was killed, and power in the state passed to his brother Abd al-Karim Biy, who came under the influence of the Ashtarkhanids from Bukhara.
