= Mukhtorkhon Tashkhodjaev =

Uzbek politician (born 1983)

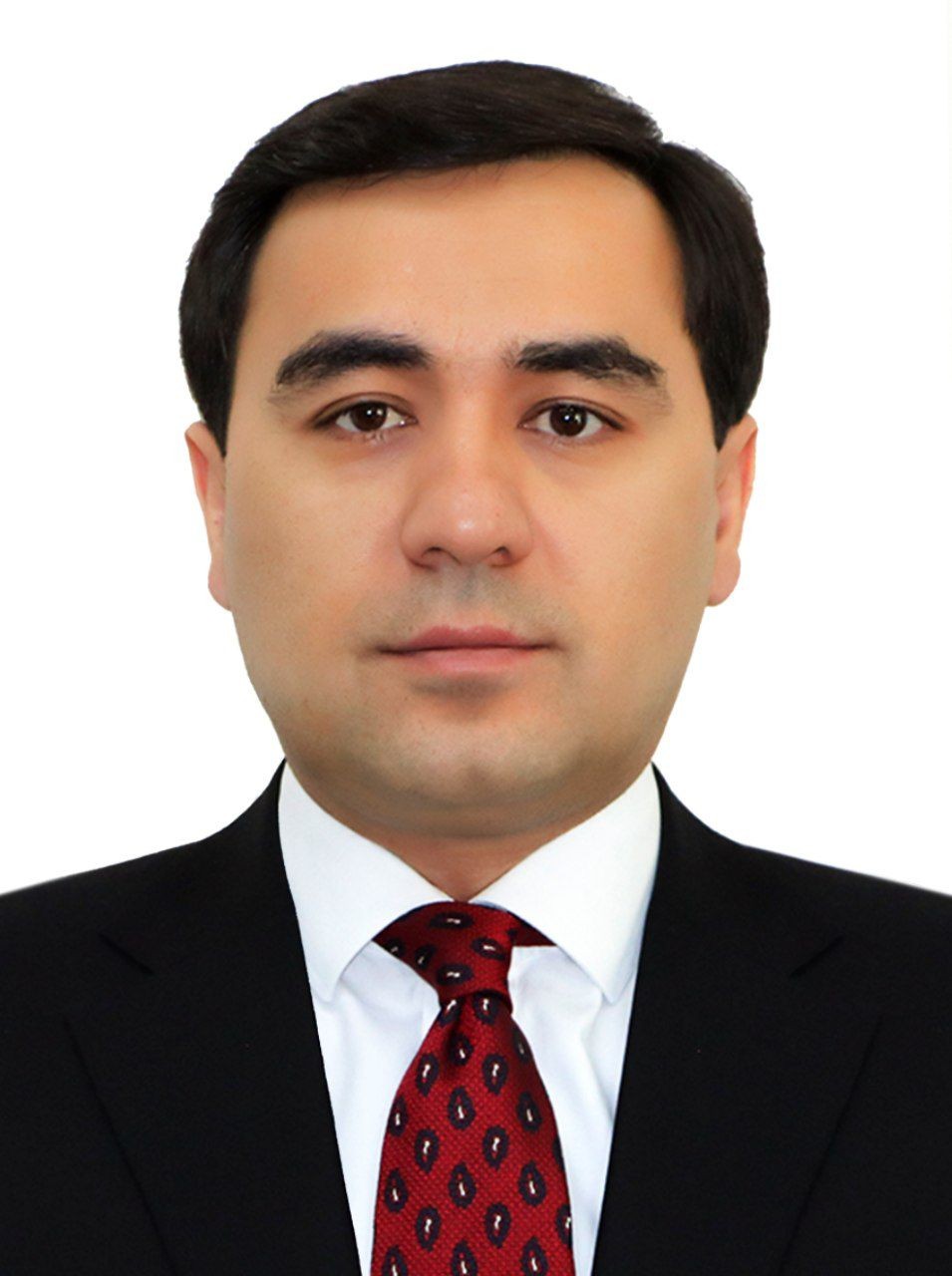
- Tashkhodjaev in 2019

Chairman of the National Paralympic Committee of Uzbekistan
- Incumbent
- Assumed office August 19, 2019

Vice-President of the Asian Paralympic Committee
- Incumbent
- Assumed office 2021

Deputy Director of the National Social Protection Agency under the President of the Republic of Uzbekistan
- Incumbent
- Assumed office 2023

Personal details
- Born: Mukhtorkhon Tashkhodjaev; September 21, 1983 (age 43) Kokand, Fergana Region, Uzbek SSR, Soviet Union (now Uzbekistan)
- Education: Tashkent State University of Economics (bachelor and master degree)
- Awards: Honored sports teacher in Uzbekistan

Mukhtorkhon Tashkhodjaev (Uzbek: Muxtorxon Tashxodjaev; Russian: Мухторхон Ташходжаев; born 21 September 1983) is an Uzbek. He is the chairman of the National Paralympic Committee of Uzbekistan; the vice-president of the Asian Paralympic Committee and Chairman of Adaptive sports Association of Uzbekistan, the chairman of the supervisory board of Kokand University. He is an Honored sports teacher in the Republic of Uzbekistan and a winner of a number of state awards.

== Early life ==
Tashkhodjaev was born on September 21, 1983, in Kokand, to a family of intellectuals. From 2002 to 2009, he was a student of the Tashkent State University of Economics, during which he studied at the bachelor's and master's levels.

== Career ==
Tashkhodjaev began his career in 2004 as an engineer at the information technology and distance learning center of Tashkent State University of Economics. From 2009 to 2010, he served as an assistant at the university's corporate management department, before becoming an assistant to the Minister of Higher and Secondary Special Education of the Republic of Uzbekistan in 2010–2011.

He returned to Tashkent State University of Economics as a researcher in 2011–2012, subsequently becoming a senior lecturer in the Department of Corporate Management and Competition Development from 2012 to 2014. He then served as Associate Professor and deputy dean of the Faculty of Banking in 2014, before becoming Dean of the Faculty of Banking from 2014 to 2016. From 2016 to 2020, he served as Dean of the Faculty of Corporate Management at Tashkent State University of Economics.

Alongside his academic career, Tashkhodjaev served as Deputy Chairman of the National Paralympic Association of Uzbekistan from 2013 to 2019, and as its Chairman from 2019 to 2021. He has served as vice-president of the Asian Paralympic Committee since 2019. Since May 25, 2021, he has served as Chairman of the National Paralympic Committee of Uzbekistan.

Mukhtorkhon Tashkhodjaev took the activities of the National Paralympic Committee of Uzbekistan to a new level. Under his leadership, the Uzbek Paralympians won 8 gold, 5 silver and 6 bronze medals at the 2020 Summer Paralympic Games, a total of 19 medals, placing 16th in the world ranking. In 2021, Tashkhodjaev was awarded the honorary title of Sports Coach of the Republic of Uzbekistan by the President of Uzbekistan for his services in the development of Paralympic sports. On June 1, 2023, he became the deputy director of the National Social Protection Agency under the President of the Republic of Uzbekistan.

== Scientific works ==
Tashkhodjaev prepared 5 textbooks, 8 teaching-methodical manuals, 2 monographs, 30 articles and theses in national and foreign journals, and 36 articles and theses at conferences held in the republic and foreign countries within the scope of scientific research.

Under Tashkhodzhaev's scientific guidance, 2 researchers received the Doctor of Philosophy (PhD) degree in economics. Also, 3 students won the state scholarship of the President of the Republic of Uzbekistan, 5 students won the famous state scholarship, and 6 students won the republican science Olympiad.

- Economic analysis of educational services market and its development // "Economics and innovative technologies" scientific electronic journal. No. 1, 2014.
- Management in higher education system // Europaische Fachhochschule European Applied Sciences 11, 2014.
- Improvement of corporate management in joint-stock companies // Economics-finance. Tashkent, 2014.
- "Infrastructure of production" // "Society of Philosophers" publishing house. Tashkent, 2014.
- Upravlenie visshim uchebnim zavedeniem // "Economy and innovative technologies scientific electronic" magazine. No. 6, September 26, 2014.
- "Effektivnoe ispolzovanie sotsialno-ekonomicheskogo potentiala i vovlechenie novikh istochnikov ekonomicheskogo rosta" // Institute of Forecasting and Macroeconomic Research, Tashkent, October 5, 2014.
- Upravlenie v sisteme visshego obrazovaniya Respubliki Uzbekistan // Business – Expert No. 12 (84), 2014.
- Infrastructure economy // Textbook. Economy, 2015
- Higher education as a major of growth and development of economy // Proceedings of the 5th Uzbekistan Indonesia international joint conference in 2015
- Issues of formation and management of innovative strategy of higher education institutions // "Finance" magazine, Tashkent financial institute No. 1, 2015.
- Sovershenstvovanie metodologii Gosudarstvennogo upravleniya sistemoi visshego obrazovaniya // Nauchno-analiticheskiy zurnal "Nauka i praktika", Moscow.: FGBOU VPO "REU im. G. V. Plekhanova", No. 1 (21) 2016, pp. 52–59.
- The role of information communication technologies in the economic development of the Republic of Uzbekistan // Emerics issue analysis, Institute for International Economic Policy, Korea, January 15, 2017
- Development opportunities of scoring method of consumer crediting in Uzbekistan // European journal of economics and management sciences No. 4 2016, Vienna, Austria.
- Prospects development of securitization of banking assets in Uzbekistan // Austrian Journal of Humanities and Social Sciences No. 9-10, September–October 2016.
- Innovative management // "Voris Nashtiyot" LLC Tashkent 2018.
- Efficiency of investments in the social sphere // Economy, 2019
- Organizational behavior // Textbook. Economy, 2019
- Ways to develop financial management in higher education institutions in Uzbekistan // "Finance and banking" scientific electronic journal. No. 4, 2020.
- The effect of paying scholarships to students and salaries to professors in higher education institutions of Uzbekistan on financial management // "Logistics and Economics" scientific electronic journal. No. 2, 2021.
- The role of the state in financing the higher education system // "Economics and innovative technologies" scientific electronic journal. No. 2, 2021.
- Issues of increasing the activity of the capital market in the corporate structures of the national economy // Scientific and innovative directions of the development of the economy of New Uzbekistan. November 25, 2021

== Awards ==
- Honorary title of the President of the Republic of Uzbekistan "Honored sports coach of the Republic of Uzbekistan".
- "Sign of Uzbekistan" badge
- Badge of the Ministry of Defense "For Exemplary Services".
- Commemorative badge "25 years of Independence of Uzbekistan".
- Commemorative badge "25 years to the Constitution of Uzbekistan".
- "30 years of Independence of Uzbekistan" commemorative badge
- Commemorative badge "30 years to the Constitution of Uzbekistan".
- Awarded with honorary certificates of the Ministry of Higher and Secondary Special Education of the Republic of Uzbekistan, Youth Union of Uzbekistan, Federation of Trade Unions of the Republic of Uzbekistan
