= Fazli Namangani =

Fazli Namangani (died after 1822) was a Central Asian bilingual poet and historian, who wrote in Persian and Chaghatai at the court of the Khanate of Kokand.

The Tajikistan Academy of Science is currently keeping Fazli's divan (collection of poems) that was replicated in Bukhara in 1811 and contains several anthologies that feature his ghazals and qasidas in Chaghatai and Persian. Fazli's poetic works encompass short narrative poems, including the story of Yusuf and Zulaikha as well as Moses.

Fazli is regarded as being the founder of the Kokand school of historiography. Before 1820, he wrote the poetic history book Umar-nama ("Book of Umar") in Persian about the Khanate of Kokand, modeled after the Timur-nama ("Book of Timur") by Hatefi (d. 1521). It has forty-two chapters and 5,000 verses.

== Sources ==
- Kleinmichel, Sigrid (2017). "Faḍlī Namangānī". In Fleet, Kate; Krämer, Gudrun; Matringe, Denis; Nawas, John; Rowson, Everett (eds.). Encyclopaedia of Islam (3rd ed.). Brill Online. ISSN 1873-9830.
- Zand, Michael (2020) [1999]. "Fażlī Namangānī, ʿAbd-al-Karīm". Brill. doi:10.1163/2330-4804_EIRO_COM_9726.
