= Muqimiy =

- urban-type settlement
- Location in Uzbekistan
- Coordinates: 40°28′43″N 70°59′17″E
- Country: Uzbekistan
- Region: Fergana Region
- City: Kokand
- Urban-type settlement status: 1973

Population (2003)
  - Total: 7,400
- Time zone: UTC+5 (UZT)

Muqimiy (Uzbek: Muqimiy, Russian: Мукими) is an urban-type settlement in Fergana Region, Uzbekistan. Administratively, it is part of the city Kokand.
