= National Paralympic Committee of Uzbekistan =

Sports organization in Uzbekistan

National Paralympic Committee
- Country: Uzbekistan
- Code: UZB
- Recognized: 2007
- Headquarters: Tashkent, Uzbekistan
- President: Mukhtorkhon Tashkhodjaev
- Website: paralympic.uz

National Paralympic Committee of Uzbekistan (Uzbek: Oʻzbekiston Milliy Paralimpiya qoʻmitasi) is a National Paralympic Committee (NPC) of Uzbekistan for the Paralympic Games movement and focused on supporting, funding the teams, representing disabled athletes at the Paralympics and in other para sporting events. National Paralympic Committee of Uzbekistan is a member of Asian Paralympic Committee (APC).

== President ==
In 2019 Mukhtorkhon Tashkhodjaev was selected as a Chairman of National Paralympic Committee of Uzbekistan.

== See also ==
- Uzbekistan at the Paralympics
- Asian Paralympic Committee
- International Paralympic Committee
