= Furqat =

Uzbek author, poet and political activist

- Born: Zokirjon Xolmuhammad oʻgʻli 1859; Kokand, Russian Turkestan
- Died: 1909 (aged 49–50); Yarkant, China
- Occupations: author, poet, and political activist

Zokirjon Xolmuhammad oʻgʻli (Uzbek: Zokirjon Xolmuhammad oʻgʻli, Зокиржон Ҳолмуҳаммад ўғли) (1859–1909), better known by his pen name Furqat, was an Uzbek author, poet, and political activist. He had a major influence on the development of modern Uzbek literature. He wrote one of the earliest pamphlets and satirical articles in Uzbek.

Furqat, like may other writers of the tsarist colonial period, was forced to praise the Russian Empire and its culture in his work. When he started to write poems that were critical of the cruelty of Russian rule, he was exiled to Chinese Turkestan.

== Life ==
Zokirjon Xolmuhammad oʻgʻli was born in 1859 in Kokand. He was sent to a madrasa at the age of fourteen. At the madrasa, Xolmuhammad oʻgʻli learned Arabic and Persian and became interested in Oriental literature. In 1876, he moved to Margilan to work for his uncle who had a shop. In 1880, Xolmuhammad oʻgʻli returned to Kokand and got married. In 1889, he moved to Tashkent.

Starting from 1891, Xolmuhammad oʻgʻli traveled extensively to many countries, including Azerbaijan, Turkey, Saudi Arabia, Egypt, Greece, Bulgaria, and India. He was exiled to Chinese Turkestan after he started to criticize the cruelty of Russian rule in his works. He arrived in Yarkant in 1893 and stayed there until his death in 1909.

== Work ==
Zokirjon Xolmuhammad oʻgʻli started writing poetry at a young age under the pen name "Furqat" which means "separation". He also wrote under the pen name "Farhat" which means "joy." In his works, Furqat praised human dignity and was an opponent of religion and asceticism.

In 1891, he wrote his autobiographical book Sarguzashtnoma (The Adventure Book). This book is also called Furqatnoma. Furqat's other works include Gimnaziya (The Gymnasium School), Ilm xosiyati (The Benefits of Education), Vistavka xususida (About Exhibitions), Akt majlisi xususida (About the Session on Statements), Nagʻma bazmi xususida (About a Music Party), Adashganman (Made a Mistake), Fasli navbahor oʻldi... (The Spring has Died), Sayding qoʻya ber, sayyod... (Leave Your Game, Hunter), Kelinchak (The Bride), Sabogʻa xitob (An Appeal to the Morning Breeze), Bormasmiz (We Won't Go) and many others. Some of Furqat's works, such as Devon (Diwan), Hammomi xayol (The Bathhouse of Thoughts), Chor darvesh (Four Dervishes), Noʻh manzar (Nine Aspects), did not survive.
