= Jahonotin Uvaysiy =

- Born: Jahon; 1781; Margilan, Khanate of Kokand
- Died: 1845 (aged 63–64); Margilan, Khanate of Kokand
- Occupation: Sufi poet
- Writing career
- Pen name: Uvaysiy
- Language: Chagatai

Jahonotin Uvaysiy (1780–1845) was a Sufi poet from Margilon in the Ferghana Valley in Uzbekistan. She was an Otin-Oys, an Uzbek religious woman held in great esteem.

She produced over 15,000 hemistiches of verse and it is still popular in Uzbekistan today. The Institute of the Academy of Science of the Republic of Uzbekistan in Tashkent has a collection of her works. Her father, Siddik Bobo, was an admirer of literature who wrote poems in two languages. Her mother, Chinbibi was also an otin.

== Bibliography ==
- Uvaysiy. Devon. Tashkent, 1963
- Uvaysiy. Ko’ngil gulzori (The flower-bed of the soul). Tashkent, 1983.
- E.Ibrohimova. Uvaysiy. Tashkent, 1963.
- T.Jalolov. O’zbek shoiralari. (Uzbek poetess). Tashkent, 1970.
- I.Hakkulov. Uvaysiy she’riyati. (The poetry of Uvaysi). Tashkent, 1982.
