= Alim Khan of Kokand =

- Khan of Kokand
- Reign: c. 1801-1810
- Predecessor: Narbuta Bey
- Successor: Muhammad Umar Khan
- Born: c. 1774; Kokand
- Died: c. 1810; Kokand
- Burial: Okhangaron, Tashkent
- Issue: Shahrukh; Ibrahim Beg; Murad Beg Khan; Aim Khan; Ulug Khan; Aftab Khan
- Father: Narbuta Bey
- Religion: Islam

Alim Khan (Note: Chagatai and Persian: عالم خان) was the Khan of Kokand c. 1801 to 1810. He became Khan after the death of his father Narbuta Bey.

== Policies as Khan ==
Alim continued his father's policies of expanding the Khanate, personally leading the military operation for the annexation of Ura-Tepe in 1806, but due to strong resistance the city had to be annexed again on multiple occasions. Alim also initiated an extensive campaign of military reforms, which included hiring mercenary Tajik forces.

Alim then took over Tashkent from Yunus Khoja, a feat his father Narbuta had attempted but failed. Kurama, containing the cities of Ura Tepe, Jizzak, and Khojend were annexed; the independent state originally under the control of a Kyrgyz sultan containing the cities of Shymkent, Turkestan and Sayram, were also captured and absorbed into the Khanate, but like Ura-Tepe resisted several times and were later re-annexed by Umar Khan.

A war broke out between Karakalpaks and Kokandian settlers along the Syr Darya river, leading to the expulsion of the Karakalpaks to Khiva. Alim's strict control of the Khanate and numerous unpopular military campaigns, including an unexplained massacre of a Kazakh village in winter, fragmented his army and led to his death at the hands of his brother Muhammad Umar Khan.

== Overthrow ==
In a plot to remove Alim as Khan, his brother Muhammad Umar announced to Alim's forces that Alim had been killed and had appointed a new governor of Tashkent, causing confusion among the 300 remaining troops loyal to Alim, which then withdrew their forces from the edge of the Chirchiq river and headed Southeast to the city of Kokand. When forces that had sworn allegiance to Umar took control of Tashkent, they declared Umar to be the Khan, while Alim spoke to his council to reconvene the troops loyal to him. Alim appointed his son to be the governor of Tashkent. With only twenty remaining loyal soldiers, Alim was advised to travel to Khodjend to meet reinforcements of 4,000 troops but did not. When he insisted on heading to the city of Kokand, 17 of the 20 remaining soldiers abandoned him; he was then fatally shot by a member of the Umar Khan faction when he got stuck in the sand with his horse. Alim's son was treated with hostility as governor of Tashkent, and was captured by the Umar's forces shortly after his father's death.
