= Muhammad Ali Khan (Kokand) =

- Khan of Kokand
- Reign: c. 1822 – 1842
- Predecessor: Muhammad Umar Khan
- Successor: Shir Ali Khan
- Born: c. 1808; Kokand
- Died: c. 1842; Kokand
- Father: Muhammad Umar Khan
- Mother: Mohlaroyim
- Religion: Islam

Muhammad Ali Khan (Note: Chagatai and Persian: محمد علی خان), commonly referred to as Madali Khan, was the official Khan of Kokand from c. 1822 to 1842. He became the official ruler of Kokand at the age of 14 after his father Muhammad Umar Khan died of an illness in 1822, although some sources claim his mother Mohlaroyim was really in charge due to Madali's young age and inexperience.

== Policies ==
Madali tried to live up to his father's legacy as khan, in doing so he took measures to improve the khanate's economy and had a large madrassa constructed. During his reign the empire spanned across the Pamir mountains, Khujand, Tashkent, Kashgar, to Southern Kazakhstan. He maintained diplomatic relations with Russia, the Ottoman Empire, the Khanate of Khiva, and the Emirate of Bukhara.

== Relations with Bukhara and downfall ==
The Bukhara - Kokand Wars initiated in 1839 when Kokand built a fort close to Bukhara. In the wars, the emir of Bukhara Nasrullah Khan took over Istaravshan and Khojend, forced Kokand to pay a large amount of tribute, and recognize Nasrullah as lord. Muhammad Ali Khan was able to escape to Margilan but then the city was captured by Nasrullah Khan. He was later killed by Nasrullah, along with the rest of his family including his mother, sons, and brothers. The occupation of Kokand did not last long and Bukhari forces were exiled two months after the massacre in Margilan.
