= Uzbek national identity =

Flag of Uzbekistan, adopted in 1991 to replace the flag of the Uzbek Soviet Socialist Republic

Uzbek national identity is a term referring to the sense of national identity, as embodied in the shared and characteristic culture, language and traditions, of the Uzbek people of Uzbekistan.

== History ==
The term "Uzbek" originally referred to the descendants of the several hundred thousand Turkic people led by Muhammad Shaybani at the start of the 16th century, who moved from the Qipchaq steppe to Central Asia.

Before the Soviet-forced division of Central Asia in 1924, the Uzbek dynasties of Kokand, Bukhara, and Khiva governed territories where many peoples lived together, making ethnic boundaries difficult to define. Persian, which at the time was regarded as the primary educated language, was the court language at Bukhara and Kokand, even though the monarchs were Uzbeks. The idea of tying a region to a certain ethnic or language group was unfamiliar to the Muslims of Central Asia. At that time, while the terms Uzbek, Tajik, Kyrgyz, and Turkmen were recognized, they did not adequately describe the overlapping and shifting identities of the population. For these people, allegiances based on tribal, clan, local, or family ties were more significant than those based solely on ethnicity, since they had long intermixed.

In the Turkestan Autonomous Soviet Socialist Republic, "Uzbek" started to refer to a larger group of people, a tendency likely started by the Russian Empire. It gradually became commonly accepted as an appropriate name for specific members of Turkic-speaking settled populations in Turkestan, apart from Turkmens, Kazakhs, and Kyrgyz. Chagatai, a region-wide, ethnically inclusive language, gradually fell out of use after Central Asia was conquered by the Russians in the late 19th century. It was replaced by other Turkic languages—such as Uzbek, Kazakh, and Turkmen—which had previously been regional varieties but were now recognized as literary languages for emerging ethno-national identities. The Uzbek national identity was first created by the Soviet Union, who founded Uzbekistan in 1924. When the Soviet Union established national and ethnic boundaries in Central Asia, many of the locals of what became Uzbekistan were unsure if they were Uzbeks, Tajiks or Kazakhs. In 1938, Chagatai was renamed as "Old Uzbek" under Soviet ideological directives, a shift that ultimately gave a misrepresented picture of the region's literary history.

Despite attempting to break free from Russo-centric historiography, post-Soviet nationalism in Uzbekistan is adhering to the same tradition. Like all the former Soviet republics, Uzbekistan launched a renewed effort to forge its national identity after gaining independence in 1991. They claimed all of Central Asia's cultural and historical heritage. Timur was proclaimed as the "Founder of the Uzbek nation" despite having belonged to a competing tribe that hated the Uzbeks. Ulugh Beg, his astronomer grandson, was proclaimed as an "Uzbek" scientist. The poet Ali-Shir Nava'i, who lived in Herat, became proclaimed as the "Father of Uzbek literature". According to Charles Kurzman; "Ironically, given Navoi's distaste for the Uzbeks of his day, his legacy is being corralled for [a] strain of nationalism-building: the revaluation of the Uzbek language". The Timurid prince Babur was proclaimed as an "Uzbek hero", despite have been forcefully relocated to India by the Uzbeks. The nationalist ideology of Uzbekistan does not include many actual Uzbeks from that era. For instance, Uzbek nationalism scarcely acknowledges the Uzbek leader Muhammad Shaybani, who conquered territory consisting of modern-day Uzbekistan.

== Sources ==
- Allworth, Edward A. (1990). The Modern Uzbeks: From the Fourteenth Century to the Present: A Cultural History. Hoover Press. ISBN 978-1784539559.
- Foltz, Richard (2019). A History of the Tajiks: Iranians of the East. Bloomsbury Publishing. ISBN 978-1784539559.
- Kılavuz, Idil Tunçer (2014). Power, Networks and Violent Conflict in Central Asia: A Comparison of Tajikistan and Uzbekistan (1st ed.). Taylor & Francis. ISBN 978-0815377931.
- Kurzman, Charles (1999). "Uzbekistan: The invention of nationalism in an invented nation". Middle East Critique. 8 (15). Taylor & Francis: 77–98. doi:10.1080/10669929908720151.
- Levi, Scott C. (2017). The Rise and Fall of Khoqand, 1709 – 1876: Central Asia in the Global Age. University of Pittsburgh. ISBN 978-0822965060.
- Roy, Olivier (2000). The New Central Asia: Geopolitics and the Birth of Nations. New York University Press. ISBN 978-0814775554.
- Rzehak, Lutz (2023). "How Tajik was made into a national language". In Ido, Shinji; Mahmoodi-Bakhtiari, Behrooz (eds.). Tajik Linguistics. De Gruyter. pp. 1–44. ISBN 978-3110619409.
- Sheikh, Hossein (2021). "Chaghatay, Language and Literature". In Madelung, Wilferd; Daftary, Farhad (eds.). Encyclopaedia Islamica Online. Brill Online. ISSN 1875-9831.
