= Otin =

Otines refer to the female Muslim religious scholars in Central Asia. They were regarded as the guardian of the Islamic faith in the era of Soviet Union. Otines are recognised as leaders in the local community. Their position has a high status, somewhat similar to a mullah's, and certain otines are officially recognized by their country's Muslim board. Otines also serve as teachers at religious schools for girls.
