= Tashkent (state) =

Historical Uzbek monarchy

Tashkent Toshkent Viloyati
- 1784–1808
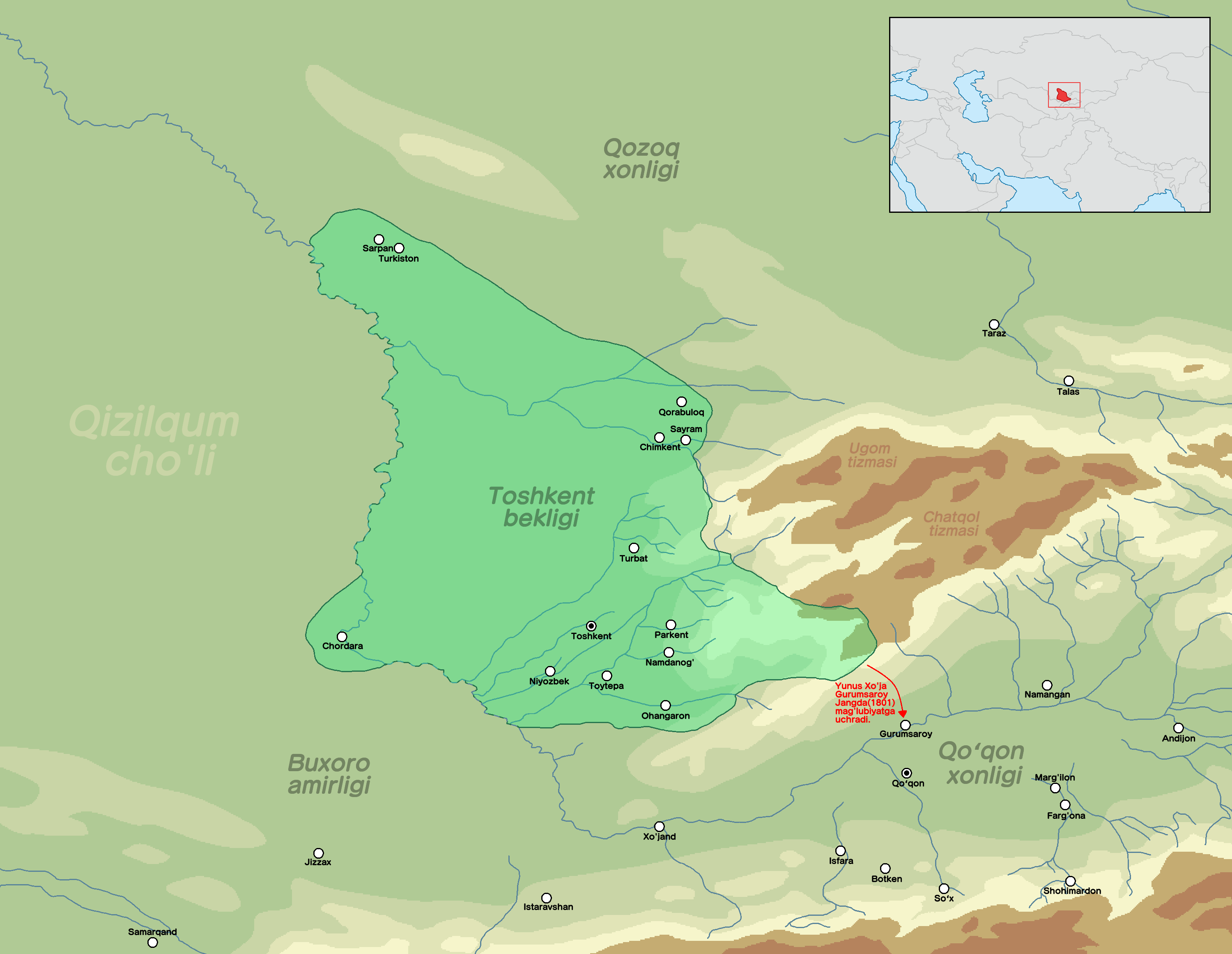
- Capital and largest city: Tashkent; 41°19′N 69°16′E
- Common languages: Uzbek
- Ethnic groups: Uzbeks, Kazakhs, Tajiks
- Religion: Sunni Islam
- Government: Monarchy
- Khan
  - 1784–1801: Yunus Khoja
  - 1801–1805: Muhammad Khoja
  - 1805–1807: Sultan Khoja
  - 1807–1808: Hamid Khoja
- History
  - Established: 1784
  - Disestablished: 1808

Area
  - estimate: 45,000 km^{2} (17,000 sq mi)

Population
  - Estimate: 150,000-200,000
- Currency: Tanga
Preceded by	Succeeded by
Khanate of Bukhara; Kazakh Khanate	Khanate of Kokand
- Today part of: Uzbekistan; Kazakhstan

Tashkent State, or simply Tashkent was an independent historical Uzbek monarchy in Central Asia, spanning over the areas that are nowadays the Tashkent Region of Uzbekistan as well as South Kazakhstan Region. It was declared in 1784 and ceased to exist in 1808, after being occupied by the Kokand Khanate. The capital was Tashkent.

== History ==
=== Background ===
In the middle of the 18th century, a troubled period occurred in the history of Tashkent, when the city was at the crossroads of the interests of the Kalmyk Khanate, Kazakh Khanate, Kokand Khanate, and, to a lesser extent, Emirate of Bukhara. The city repeatedly passed from one ruler to another. In addition, there was an internecine war between four parts of the city, called dakhas: Kukcha, Sibzar, Sheykhantaur and Beshagach. The head of each of them (hakim) sought to subdue other regions.

By the 1780s, lengthy and bloody strife became intolerable. At the same time, the Sheykhantaur hakim died, transferring the power to his son, Yunus Khoja.

=== Yunus Khoja's reign ===
In 1784, the rivalry of the four parts of Tashkent resulted in an armed clash. The battle took place near a city bazaar, in a ravine, along which flows the Bozsu channel. This section of the channel became known as Djangob, literally "stream of battle". The conflict was won by Yunus Khoja, and his authority was recognized over the whole city. As a residence, the ruler chose a fortress that stood on the banks of the Chorsu aryk. Later on, this area has been named Karatash. The institution of the four hakims (charkhakim) was abolished, although the division into the dakhas was preserved.

== Geography ==
The southern and western borders of the state were defined by the course of the Syr Darya river. To the north, the border followed the city of Turkestan, while in the northwest, it followed the boundary between the foothills and the Karatau mountain range. The eastern border ran along the foothills of Boroldaitau and the Sairam range. In the Sairam region, it turned south, crossed the Qarjantau range, and followed the right bank of the Ugam River. It then continued along the ridge of the Almazar mountain range, passing south of Hojakent, near the Chatkal mountain range. Following the watershed between the Shavazsay and another unnamed stream, it reached the village of Ablyk (close to Angren). From there, the border extended along the southwestern slopes of the Qurama mountains to the Mamyrsai-bel pass and then followed the eastern slopes of the Qurama to the village of Sangar—the southeasternmost point of Tashkent’s territory.

== Government ==
From the very first days of his victory, Yunus-Khoja began consolidating his rule and making use of the state administration apparatus. Initially, his governance was quite rudimentary. According to Muhammad Salih Qari Tashkendi, the feudal-tribal nobility of the nomads played a key role in organizing his government. Rustam-Tura was appointed to the position of atalyq, Adil-Tura as parvanači, and Babakhan-Tura as the commander-in-chief. Yunus-Khoja himself was unanimously proclaimed Wali of Vilayat (ruler of the province).

According to Russian envoys D. Telyatnikov and M. Pospelov, as well as statements made by the Tashkent envoy in Omsk, Muhammad-Khoja Rahim oglu, the ruler of the Tashkent state was a khan who referred to himself with the title of Ishan.

The "khan" of Tashkent, Yunus-Khoja, although surrounded by his supporters from among the nomads, was forced to consult and make state decisions not only with them but also with representatives of each of the four Daha—Kokcha, Sibzar, Sheykhantaur and Beshagach (the districts of the Tashkent city). Four aqsaqals of city formed the khan's council, advising him on both national and military affairs. These elders (aksakals) represented the four parts of the city and were elected by the population to the highest administrative public positions within their respective Daha. Coming from the most prosperous and therefore most influential class of city dwellers, they guided Yunus-Khoja's state policy based on the interests of the large merchants and artisans who formed the core of the urban population.

=== Foreign relations ===
==== Kazakh tribes ====
Having seized Tashkent, Yunus-Khoja, according to the Kokand historian Muhammad-Hakim, also brought the Kazakh steppes under his control. Pospelov's report indicates that the conquest of the Kazakh steppes was completed in 1798. These same sources establish that the authority of the ruler of Tashkent was limited to the territory of the Senior Jüz, extending to the area of Chimkent in the northeast and Turkestan in the north, exclusively.

In his renowned work "Description of the Kyrgyz-Kazakh, or Kyrgyz-Kaisak Hordes and Steppes," A. I. Levshin wrote:

It is unknown why the Kyrgyz-Kazakhs, possessing such great strength, never fully seized Tashkent and did not settle there. However, it is certain that this city suffered from their raids almost until recent times. The khans of Tashkent, being weak and lacking initiative, sought to avert these incursions more through flattery, gifts, and concessions rather than resistance and decisive countermeasures. The Kyrgyz-Kazakhs, in turn, became accustomed to viewing such leniency as a sign of weakness, and consequently, this approach encouraged them to continue their acts of violence rather than deterred them.

Sources that describe the subjugation of the Kazakhs as having been carried out "without bloodshed" also report the exceptionally harsh measures used by Yunus-Khoja in his war against the Kazakhs.

To ensure loyalty and the fulfillment of vassal obligations, hostages (amanats) were taken from each tribe, specifically from among the tribal elite. If a tribe failed to uphold its vassal duties, these hostages were subjected to repressive measures, including execution. After conquering the Senior Jüz, Yunus-Khoja abolished the khanate title and governed the Senior Jüz through his own appointees, who were selected from the nobility of individual tribes.

==== Relations with Russia ====
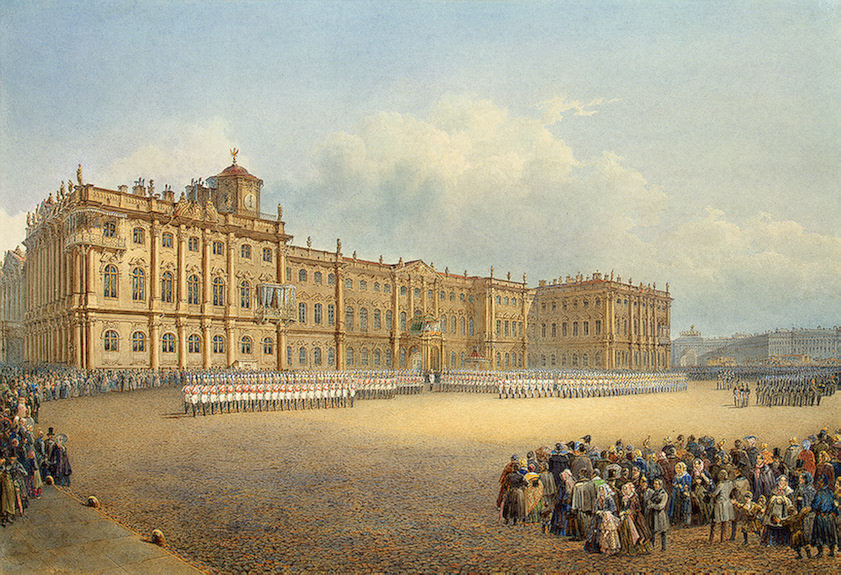
The Winter Palace in St. Petersburg. Embassies of Tashkent and other Central Asian states were received here.

Yunus-Khoja sends diplomatic mission to the West Siberian Administration of Russian Empire with the following message:

At this auspicious time, let it be known to the esteemed court of the great Tsar that, by the grace of Allah and His holy will, our land, through the boundless favor of the Almighty, has attained prosperity, good days, and flourishing conditions.

We express our hope that our friends, too, may enjoy well-being for many years and always remain in possession of honor and authority in this world and the next.

Furthermore, let it not be hidden from your wisdom that at present, the entire Kazakh Horde, the Great Horde, and the Tashkent region are under our rule, and they now stand as one head and one body. All our people have become friends of our friends and enemies of our enemies, speaking with one voice and acting as one.

At this favorable moment, we have written this letter, affixed our seal to it, and dispatched to you Muhammad-Khoja and Aziz-Khoja, appointing them as caravan-bashis and sending them along with the merchants we have gathered.

If, by the will of the Almighty, they arrive safely and unharmed and convey to you news of our well-being and prosperity, you may believe them. You, too, on your part, should send merchants you find in your lands to our side for trade.

If the Almighty so wills, then, as the proverb says: If the father acts, the son will not be harmed; if the son acts, the father will not be harmed. Among our people, robbery has now been eradicated. You should also instruct the merchants to refrain from causing harm to one another and ensure that your trading people feel secure in their travels to Tashkent.

Additionally, let the esteemed general and the respected colonel take care of the merchants traveling from us to you.

As for all other matters, whatever Muhammad-Khoja and Aziz-Khoja, the bearers of this letter, may communicate to you verbally—believe them.

— Yunus-Khoja

The original letter bore the seal of Yunus-Khoja. It was an elongated hexagon, with Yunus-Khoja’s name engraved on it. Along the outer edge of the seal, there was a narrow band forming a border, adorned with a vegetal ornament characteristic of the decorative patterns commonly found in Tashkent's traditional wood carving.

=== Military ===
The karakazan army was a key military force in Tashkent under Yunus Khoja. According to Muhammad Salih Qori Tashkandi and D. Telyatnikov, it consisted of Yunus Khoja’s personal troops, his sons, and high-ranking officials, mainly from the elite and sedentary population. Each unit was led by a commander, quartered on his estate, and equipped with weapons and horses provided by their leader. Soldiers received land for sustenance and were exempt from taxes but had to work on their commander’s fields.

The karakazans were mainly recruited from fugitives of various backgrounds, including Kalmyks, Uzbeks, Khoqandians, Bukharans, but there were very few native Tashkent people among the Karakazans. Many were prisoners captured in raids, especially from the Kazakh steppe. They were well-armed, using matchlock rifles, armor, shields, and helmets. By 1800, Tashkent’s artillery included large-caliber cannons made from Russian-imported copper. Locally produced gunpowder and ammunition were noted for their quality.

The army of the Karakazans was not particularly numerous. Even 12 years after Yunus-Khoja came to power, according to D. Telyatnikov, it numbered only 2 thousand people. However, it was of great importance as an organized military-police force and the core of the armed forces of Tashkent, the bulk of which consisted of the city militia and the militia of nomadic tribes, mainly Sanychkly, Kangly, Bagys and Ramadan. One or two people from each house, and sometimes all men, were called up to the city militia in Tashkent city. By the late 18th century, the army grew to 6,000 troops, supported by a feudal militia of 50,000–70,000, including 30,000 urban militia. Tashkent’s military strength allowed it to dominate the Chirchik Valley and reassert control over local nomadic tribes.

== Demographics ==
=== Sedentary population ===
The main settlements in the region included the cities of Tashkent, Sairam, and Turkestan, as well as the villages of Farikent (Parkent), Namdanak, Adanak, Toytepa, Satkent, Karamurt, and Kereuchi, fortresseses of Matin and Kahrak stood along the Angren River. On the right bank of the Chirchiq river, the fortresses of Chardara, Niyazbek, Shahrukhiya, Durmancha, and Turbat were located.

The sedentary population is more precisely documented compared to nomadic groups; according to Russian diplomatic reports, it numbered up to 52,000 people. The total population of the Tashkent city itself, by the end of the 18th century, was slightly more than 40 thousand people. Tashkent was at that time the largest city in Central Asia after Bukhara.

=== Nomadic population ===
The steppe regions of the Chirchiq Valley, particularly to the south and near Tashkent, were inhabited by nomadic tribes collectively referred to as the "Chanchely." In the Arys region and the steppe between the Alkakul-kum sandy massif and the mountainous areas, nomadic camps of the Sergeli tribe were established. North of the Arys River, the nomadic Sara tribe roamed, while near the city of Turkestan, the Yusun tribe maintained their camps.

The exact population of the nomadic groups is unknown. However, it is estimated that their numbers remained relatively stable over the following century, despite some nomadic tribes temporarily migrating beyond the region before returning. An exception was the Yusun nomads, some of whose clans resettled in the Nura River region during the subjugation of Turkestan by Tashkent and did not return.

Based on historical records of the nomadic tribes in the region, by the 18th century, there were approximately 18,000 yurts within the Tashkent domain, housing around 100,000 people. As a result, the total population of the Tashkent domain is estimated to be between 150,000 and 200,000 people, with the majority being nomads.

== Economy ==
=== Currency ===
Tashkent became the capital of this relatively vast possession, began to mint its own coins and develop an independent foreign and domestic economic policy.

The mint of Tashkent belonged to Yunus-Khoja, and the revenues from the minting process went directly into his treasury. In Tashkent, copper fractional coins were minted in denominations of 1, ½, and ¼ tenges (equivalent to 15 kopecks at the 1866 exchange rate). The year and place of minting were indicated only on certain issues. The minting of these coins began in the 80s of 18th century.

The reverse side of the coins typically bore the inscription: "Muhammad Yunus Khoja Umeri," while the obverse featured a blessing starting with "Bismillah..." However, according to Professor G. N. Malitsky, some coins also featured unique design elements, such as a bird soaring in the sky or an animal with long horns (or ears?), and in some cases, even a tiger.

Collections of Tashkent coins are kept in the Hermitage Museum and the Tashkent Historical Museum of the Academy of Sciences of the Uzbekistan.

=== Weights and measures ===
Farsang — 6-8 kilometres

== Culture ==
=== Language ===
In all Uzbek khanates, Persian was the primary language of diplomatic and other official documents. The Tashkent state was the first in Central Asia to begin using the Uzbek language for official documents, that is, the language spoken by the majority of the population of the Tashkent state.

Diplomatic letters sent to Russia were written in Uzbek. And all documents of Russia were written in Russian with their translation into "Tatar".

On the markets of Tashkent, books (manuscripts and lithographs) were sold in Arabic, Persian, and Turkic languages, published in Central Asia, India, Iran, Turkey, and Kazan.
