= Muhammad Umar Khan =

- Khan of Kokand
- Reign: c. 1810-1822
- Predecessor: Alim Khan
- Successor: Muhammad Ali Khan
- Born: c. 1787; Kokand
- Died: c. 1822; Kokand
- Spouse: Mohlaroyim
- Father: Narbuta Bey
- Religion: Islam

Muhammad Umar Khan (Note: Chagatai and Persian: محمد عمر خان) was the Khan of Kokand from c. 1810 until his subsequent illness and death in c. 1822. He studied at a madrassa after completing his primary education before seizing power from his brother Alim Khan. His poetry written under the pen name "Amir" touched on subjects spanning from humanism, culture, and enlightenment in diwans covering twelve genres. His teenage son Muhammad Ali Khan was given the title of Khan after his death.

== Family ==
Umar was the son of the Khan Narbuta Bey who reigned from 1774 to 1798. Umar took the title of Khan from his brother Alim Khan with the help of several co-conspirators. In 1810 Umar and his companions spread a rumor in Tashkent that Alim had been killed and took on the title of Khan. Alim, hearing of the rumors on a military mission, returned to Kokand immediately, only to be ambushed by the Umar faction with Kambar Mirza shooting Alim.

Umar's wife Mohlaroyim took an active role in the social life of Kokand as a patron of the arts of sciences and wrote under the pen name of Nodira. His teenage son Muhammad Ali Khan was his official successor to the title Khan of Kokand.

== Foreign Policy ==
Umar continued his predecessor's legacy of expanding the Khanate, but to a lesser extent. In 1816 the city of Turkestan was annexed from the Emirate of Bukhara. Whilst visiting the tomb of Khoja Akhmet Yassawi he declared himself to be the Amir al-Mu'minin, Leader of the Faithful.

Ura-Tube was annexed by Kokand in 1817 and fortresses were constructed on the banks of the Syr Darya river in Zhanakorgan, Julek, Kamish Kurgan, Kyzylorda, and Kushkurgan to provide for safe caravan trade with Russia. However, one of his diplomats sent to Russian was shot by a Russian soldier and another died of illness. Diplomatic and trade relations were maintained with the Emirate of Bukhara, Khanate of Khiva and Ottoman Empire; the embassy in Istanbul was established in 1819.

== Domestic Policy ==
Umar Khan attempted to imitate Tamerlane by encouraging study in the fields of science, literature and the development of agriculture. Cemeteries, mosques, and madrasas were built in the cities of Kokand, Tashkent, Turkestan, Shymkent, Sayram, and Taraz. The clergy were given a substantial amount of power and sharia was used to justify suppressing political dissent.
