= Khanate of Kokand =

1709–1876 state in Central Asia

Coordinates: 40.5286°N 70.9425°E

Khanate of Kokand خان‌نشین خوقند
- 1709–1876
- Flag of Kokand

- Map of the Khanate of Kokand and its territorial acquisitions
- Status: Khanate
- Capital: Koktonliq Ata (1709–1740); Kokand (1740–1876)
- Common languages: Persian (official, court, administration, literature, historiography); Chagatai Turkic (secondary language, literature)
- Religion: Sunni Islam
- Government: Monarchy
- Khan
  - 1709–1722: Shahrukh Biy
  - 1723–1733: Abd al-Rahim Biy
  - 1842–1845: Shir Ali Khan
  - 1845–1875: Khudayar Khan
  - 1876: Nasruddin Khan
- History
  - Established: 1709
  - Disestablished: 1876

Area
- Late 1830s: 647,497 km^{2} (250,000 sq mi)
Preceded by	Succeeded by
Khanate of Bukhara	Fergana Oblast
- Today part of: Uzbekistan; Kyrgyzstan; Tajikistan; Kazakhstan

The Khanate of Kokand (Persian: خان‌نشین خوقند, Chagatay: خوقند خانليغى) was an early modern state in the Fergana Valley of Central Asia. At its peak, it stretched from the Ulu Tau mountains in the north, Sariqol in the south, Aq Masjid in the west, and Karakol in the east. Its territory is today divided between Uzbekistan, Kyrgyzstan, Tajikistan, and Kazakhstan.

It was established during the decline of the Khanate of Bukhara by Shahrukh Biy, the leader of the Ming tribe of Uzbeks. It developed into a multi-ethnic polity with a diverse population of sedentary Turkic and Persian-speaking communities (collectively referred to as Sarts), nomadic Turco-Mongol tribes, and Pamiri groups. It was similar to its predecessors in numerous aspects, including its internal organization, such as civilian and military personnel having Perso-Islamic and Turco-Mongol titles.

Culturally, the khanate was Persian and Muslim. Persian served as the court, literary, and administrative language, while Chagatai Turkic served as a secondary language, but still experienced substantial growth. Bilingualism was common in urban centers, reflecting the mingling of Turkic and Persian identities. Society in the khanate revolved around local, clan, and tribal connections rather than strict ethnic lines.

Kokand's economy was rooted in agriculture, supported by extensive irrigation systems and labor mobilization by local communities. The khanate attracted Indian merchants and financiers to strengthen its agricultural sector. Militarily, Kokand evolved from reliance on irregular Uzbek troops to a standing army equipped with muskets, cannons, and artillery. Despite these efforts, its weaponry was generally inferior to the forces of the Russian Empire, who abolished the khanate in 1876.

== History ==
=== Background ===
The Khanate of Kokand was ruled by the Shahrukhid dynasty, who belonged to the Ming tribe of Uzbeks. During this period, the term "Uzbek" did not have the same meaning as today. It specifically referred to the descendants of the several hundred thousand Turkic people led by Muhammad Shaybani at the start of the 16th century, who moved from the Qipchaq steppe to Central Asia. During the early 18th-century, the authority of the Khanate of Bukhara over the Fergana Valley was weakening. Meanwhile, the authority of the Sufi Khojas was increasing, and invasions were carried out by nomadic Kyrgyz, Kazakhs, and Oirats (including their Kalmyk subgroup). Throughout the 18th century, the rulers of the Kokand Khanate used the title of biy, a local version of the Turkic title beg.

=== Early period (1709–1799) ===
In 1709, the leader of the Ming tribe, Shahrukh Biy (r. 1709–1722), established the Koktonliq Ata fortress near Kokand, becoming its ruler and thus starting the Khanate of Kokand. In the 1720s and 1730s, the Fergana Valley was largely unaffected by the violent nomadic invasions of the Samarkand and Bukhara oases, and many refugees from the destroyed adjacent regions moved to Kokand. Shahrukh Biy's eldest son and successor Abd al-Rahim Biy briefly occupied Khujand, Urateppe, and the remnants of Samarkand during this period of instability. He also made an alliance with the Uzbek Keneges tribe, who ruled Shahrisabz. He did this by marrying Oychuchuk Oyim, the daughter of Ibrahim Biy Keneges.

The Khanate of Kokand was still in its formative stages during this period, and local political powers in the valley frequently caused it to become unstable even though it had gained some success in warfare. Samarkand was lost after six months, although Kokand was able to retain Khojand for the most part. For the following 140 years, Urateppe would be the focal point of almost constant fighting between Kokand and the Emirate of Bukhara. In 1734, Abd al-Rahim was murdered in Khojand, after a period of suffering from severe mental disorder and refusing to step down from power. He was succeeded by his brother Abd al-Karim Biy (r. 1734–1751), who married his widow Oychuchuk Oyim, even while she was carrying Abd al-Rahim's daughter.

In 1740, Abd al-Karim Biy had the Kokand fortress constructed at the ruins of the old fortress Eski Orda. The place became the new capital, and swiftly expanded into a sizable city. During this period, the population of the Fergana Valley grew, and urbanization increased significantly. There were four different groups of people who came to Kokand; the Samarkandi, Kashgari, Chankati, and Kuhistani. Although the Iranian ruler Nader Shah (r. 1736–1747) made military expeditions across the Amu Darya during this period (in 1737 and 1740), Kokand was not directly attacked. Nevertheless, the occupation of surrounding regions by Iranian forces affected Kokand's future.

=== Fought against the Dzungars ===
Following Nader Shah's expansion in Central Asia, Abd al-Karim Biy formed an alliance with him and received political and artillery support from the Afsharids, increasing the political influence of Kokand and contributing to the fight against the Dzungars. Diplomatic and commercial relations between the Kokand and Dzungar khanates sharply declined following the harassment of Dzungar merchants by Kokandians and Abdul Karim Bi's refusal to pay tribute to Galdan Tseren. In 1742, a 30,000-strong Dzungar army invaded Tashkent and Kokand but stalled due to fierce resistance and heavy losses. In 1745, the Dzungar Khanate invaded the Fergana Valley, laying siege to Kokand. During a renewed offensive in 1745, Abdul Karim Bi briefly installed Tole Bi as co-governor of Tashkent, who reportedly poisoned a Dzungar commander before evacuating. Facing Russian and Persian threats, the Dzungars suffered a final defeat at Kokand, where a bridge trap killed over 2,000 soldiers. The war ended with Galdan Tseren's death in September 1745 and a full Dzungar withdrawal. This victory solidified Abdul Karim Bi's authority and catalyzed the liberation of the Senior Jüz. The Yuz Uzbeks of Urateppe, probably wanting to prevent the Dzungars from attacking them, helped Kokand end the siege against the Dzungars. Abd al-Karim Biy was eventually forced to make peace with the Dzungars, persuading them to leave the Fergana Valley by giving them many riches and handing over his eldest son, Baba Biy, as a hostage. After Abd al-Karim Biy's death in 1751, his other son Irdana Biy (r. 1751–1752, 1753–1769) succeeded him. He was ousted from power in 1752, when the Jungars forced Baba Biy on the Kokand throne. The Kokandis, considering him a Jungar puppet, executed him in the town of Besh Ariq the following year and reinstated Irdana Biy.

=== Relationship with Qing ===
Among his various accomplishments, Irdana Biy stands out for entering into relations with the Qing emperor Qianlong (r. 1735–1796) after the latter had extended his authority westward into Altishahr, thus becoming the new neighbor of Kokand. A Qing colonial presence in the Fergana Valley appears to have been suggested by Qing records when referring to its official relationship with Kokand. However, more recent evaluations have shown that their relationship was highly unclear. Irdana Biy's reign was generally successful. Despite losing severely to the Yuz Uzbeks, he also conquered several vilayats and temporarily took control of Tashkent in 1765 before Ablay Khan retook it. By the time he died from illness in 1769, he had five daughters but no son to succeed him, and he was thus succeeded by his cousin Sulayman Biy, a grandson of Shahrukh Biy. However, Sulayman Biy was considered unsuited to rule, which lead to his murder three months after. He was succeeded by Abd al-Karim Biy's grandson Narbuta Biy (r. 1770–1799), whose succession was backed by the Uzbek nobility.

=== Expansion (1799–1849) ===
Soon after the death of Narbuta Biy, his son Alim (r. 1799–1811) assumed power. While his brother had been Narbuta's chosen successor, Alim's mother being Ming helped him gain more support. From the start of his reign, Alim faced significant resistance to his rule. He married his sister to an influential figure in the country and appointed to hakim of Isfara, replacing an unsupportive emir who held the post. When the emir refused to leave, Alim led a military campaign against him. Soon after, he began to execute close family members, the emirs and khojas who supported them, former administrators, and religious leaders, with others fleeing the country. Partially in response to the purges, the hakim of Chust, Buzurg Khoja, launched a revolt against Alim. While the revolt was initially put down, Buzurg Khoja fled to Tashkent and allied with its hakim, Yunus Khoja, who dispatched a large army to Kokand. By allying with the Tajik military commander Rajab, Alim destroyed Tashkent's army, ending the revolt. After the battle, Alim presented a new daftar to administrators, symbolically ending the purges. While the purges had ended, Alim remained a harsh ruler, mandating an exam before one could become a sufi, and banning several non-Islamic traditional religious practices.

Early into his reign, Alim expanded irrigation in the Fergana Valley by dredging the Yangi Ariq ("New Canal") and establishing new branches, which expanded and improved coverage to tens of thousands of hectares. Alim also began to mint silver coinage, centralizing the economy. While the domestic economy improved, Alim's aggressive attitude towards the Qing Empire caused official trade to suffer. Andijani merchants still predominated in Xinxiang, but it took until an official apology in 1809 before the Qing reestablished relations and allowed envoys to travel to the capital. Alim also launched reforms to modernize the army, imposing new taxes to do so. In addition to the old army of irregular troops, Alim established a new personally loyal standing army, significantly composed of undervalued Pamiri soldiers.

Alim was both ruthless and efficient. He created an army of Ghalcha highlanders, and conquered the western half of the Fergana Valley, including Khujand and Tashkent. He was assassinated by his brother Umar in 1811. Umar's son, Mohammed Ali (Madali Khan), ascended to the throne in 1822 at the age of 12. During his reign, the Khanate of Kokand reached its greatest territorial extent.

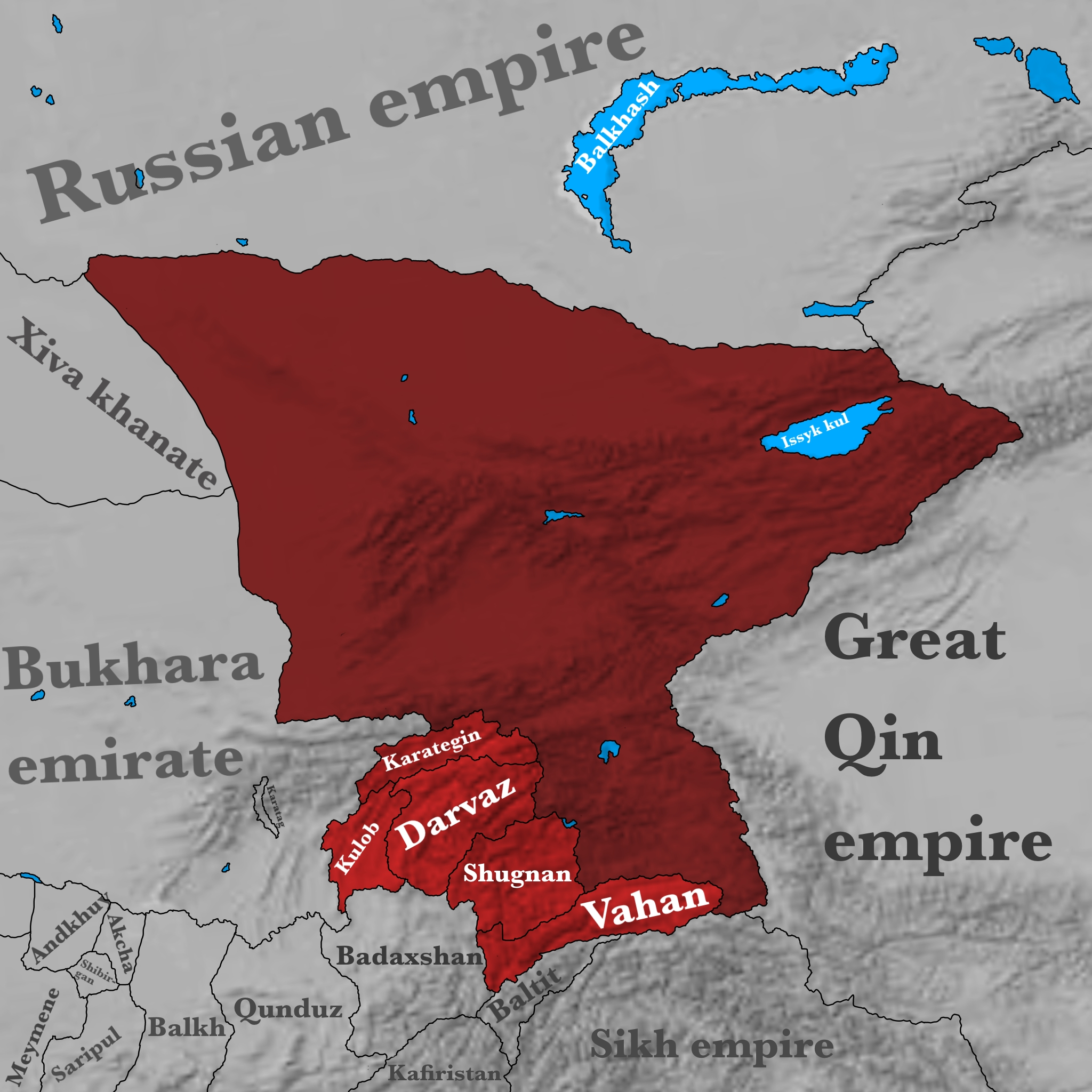
Map of the Khanate of Kokand under Madalikhan's rule

The Kokand Khanate also housed the Khojas of Kashgar like Jahangir Khoja. In 1841, the British officer Captain Arthur Conolly failed to persuade the various khanates to put aside their differences, in an attempt to counter the growing penetration of the Russian Empire into the area. In November 1841, Captain Conolly left Kokand for Bukhara in an ill-fated attempt to rescue fellow officer Colonel Charles Stoddart, and both were executed on 24 June 1842 by the order of Emir Nasrullah Khan of Bukhara.

=== Decline and downfall (1842–1876) ===
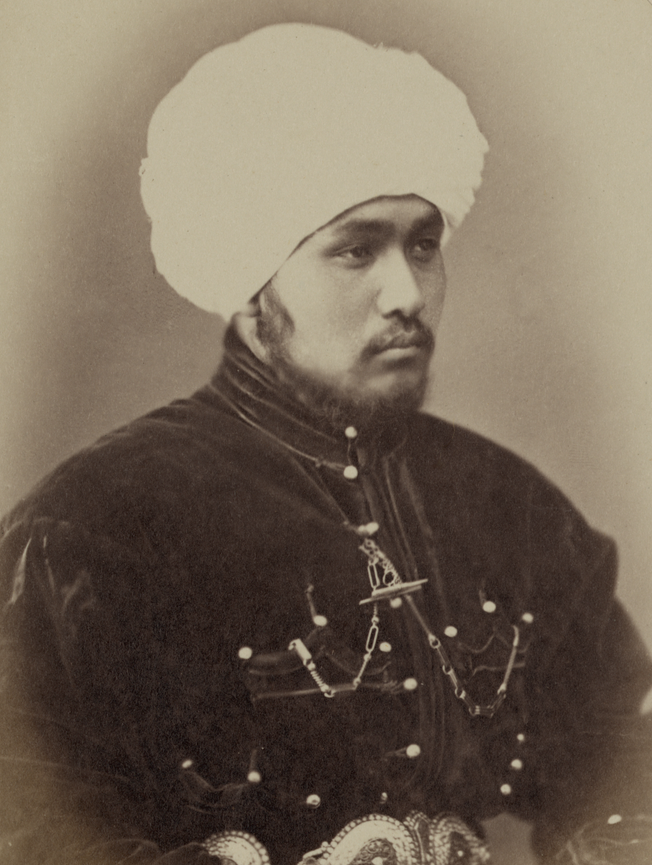
Nasruddin Khan, the last Shahrukhid ruler of the Kokand Khanate. Photograph taken between 1865–1872

Following this, Madali Khan, who had received Conolly in Kokand, and who had also sought an alliance with Russia, lost the trust of Nasrullah. The Emir, encouraged by the conspiratorial efforts of several influential figures in Kokand (including the commander in chief of its army), invaded the Khanate in 1842. Shortly thereafter he executed Madali Khan, his brother, and Omar Khan's widow, the famed poet Nodira. Madali Khan's cousin, Shir Ali, was installed as the Khan of Kokand in June 1842. Over the next two decades, the khanate was weakened by a bitter civil war, which was further exacerbated by Bukharan and Russian incursions. During this period, the Kyrgyz tribes also broke away, forming the Kara-Kyrgyz Khanate under the leadership of Ormon Khan. Shir Ali's son, Khudayar Khan, ruled from 1844 to 1858, from 1862 to 1863, and from 1865 to 1875. In the meantime, Russia was continuing its advance; on 29 June 1865 Tashkent was taken by the Russian troops of General Chernyayev; the loss of Khujand followed in 1867.

Shortly before the fall of Tashkent, Kokand’s best-known son, Yakub Beg, former lord of Tashkent, was sent by the then Khan of Kokand, Alimqul, to Kashgar, where the Hui Muslims were in revolt against the Chinese. When Alimqul was killed in 1865 during the battle with Russia for Tashkent, many Kokandian soldiers fled to join Yaqub Beg, helping him establish his dominion (known as Yettishar) throughout the Tarim Basin, which lasted until 1877, when Qing reconquered the region.

The now powerless Khudayar Khan spent his energies improving his lavish palace. Western visitors were impressed by the city of 80,000 people, which contained some 600 mosques and 15 madrasahs. Insurrections against Russian rule and Khudayar’s oppressive taxes forced him into exile in 1875. He was succeeded by his son, Nasruddin Khan, whose anti-Russian stance provoked the annexation of Kokand by generals Konstantin von Kaufman and Mikhail Skobelev. The Khanate of Kokand was declared abolished, and incorporated into the Fergana Oblast of Russian Turkestan.

== Society and culture ==
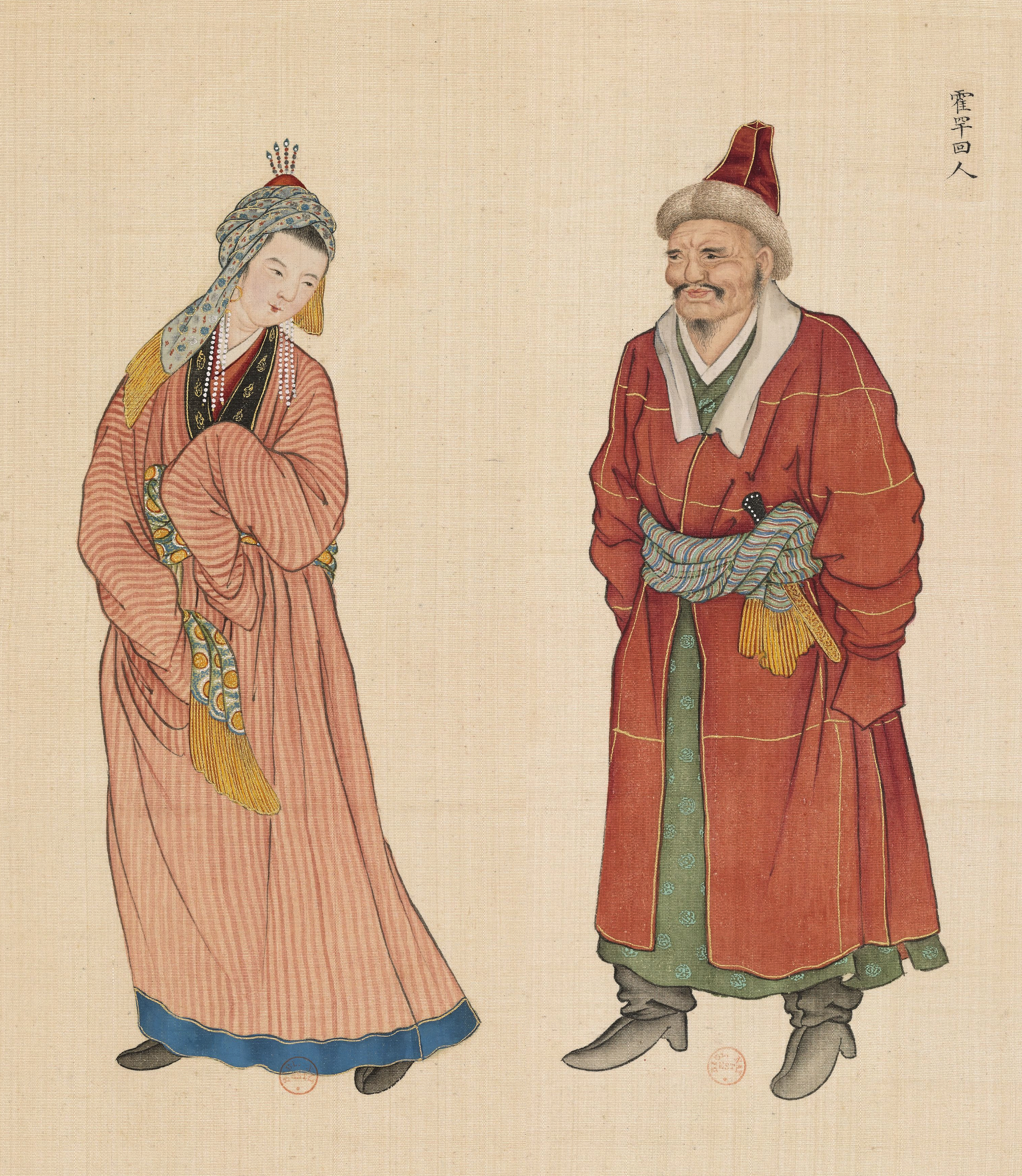
Couple from the Khanate of Kokand in the Chinese Huang Qing Zhigong Tu, dated 1769

In the 1830s, more than 5 million people lived in the Khanate of Kokand. Roughly 3 million of them were sedentary residents with Turkic and Iranian roots, while the remaining population of 2.0–2.5 million were nomadic tribes, spread across 400,000 households, consisting of various Turko-Mongolian groups such as Uzbeks, Kazakhs, Kyrgyz, Karakalpaks, Kalmyks, and Farghani Qipchaqs. Turkic-speakers, whatever their dialect, were referred to as Turks, while Persian-speakers were referred to as Tajiks. Some non-Persian Iranians from the mountains, such as the Pamiri Shughni people, also referred to themselves as Tajik, though others commonly called them by different names, such as "Ghalcha". The term "Sart" was commonly applied to sedentary Turks and Tajiks. Usually bilingual in Turkic and Persian, they belonged to the same cultural tradition and occupied the same economic role.

The Kazakhs and Kyrgyz, being proudly devoted to their rural, nomadic ways of life and values, strongly disliked the highly Persianized speech of Turkic by the Sarts. Meanwhile, the Persian Tajik dialect had been adopting Turkic vocabulary and syntax, which caused it to shift away from standard Persian. Because of this diverse population and their role in political, cultural, and economic affairs, the Khanate of Kokand cannot be considered solely an "Uzbek state".

The idea of tying a region to a certain ethnic or language group was unfamiliar to the Muslims of Central Asia. At that time, while terms such as Uzbek, Tajik, and Kyrgyz were recognized, they did not adequately describe the overlapping and shifting identities of the population. For these people, allegiances based on tribal, clan, local, or family ties were more significant than those based solely on ethnicity, since they had long intermixed. Due to years of interaction between Turks and Tajiks, the urban population of Central Asian cities developed a unique mixed identity, making it difficult to determine which linguistic community an urban inhabitant belonged to, since bilingualism was widespread. This is demonstrated in the bayaz, private journals wrapped in leather from the 16th to 19th centuries, where verses in both languages often appeared together. Unlike grandiose manuscripts made for the elite, these notebooks reflect popular readership. The most well-known poet at this time seems to have been the Persian poet Jami, who was followed by two other poets who also wrote in the same language, Hafez and Amir Khusrow. However, the Turkic poets Ali-Shir Nava'i and Fuzuli are also commonly cited. In 1924, when the Soviet Union established national and ethnic boundaries in Central Asia, many of the locals of the present-day countries of Uzbekistan and Tajikistan were unsure if they were Tajiks or Uzbeks.

Since the 8th and 9th centuries, the common culture of the locals was Persian and Muslim. Persian was the language of civilisation par excellence and the principal language of culture, serving as the official and court language of Khanate of Kokand. It was the primary language for recording Kokand's history, and it also dominated administrative records, with Chagatai Turkic appearing only occasionally. Chagatai served as the secondary language, and experienced substantial growth, especially in poetry. In the first half of the 19th century, the flourishing of lyrical and epic works in Kokand contributed to its rise as an important literary hub. Notable writers during this period were; Muhammad Umar Khan and his wife Nodira, Ada, Mahmud Makhmur, Muhammad Sharif Gulkhani, Junaydullah Haziq, Nadir, Akmal, Ghazi, Jahonotin Uvaysiy, Mahzuna and Dilshad Barna. The works of over 70 poets are included in an anthology of Kokand poets compiled by Fazli Namangani in 1821.

== Administration ==
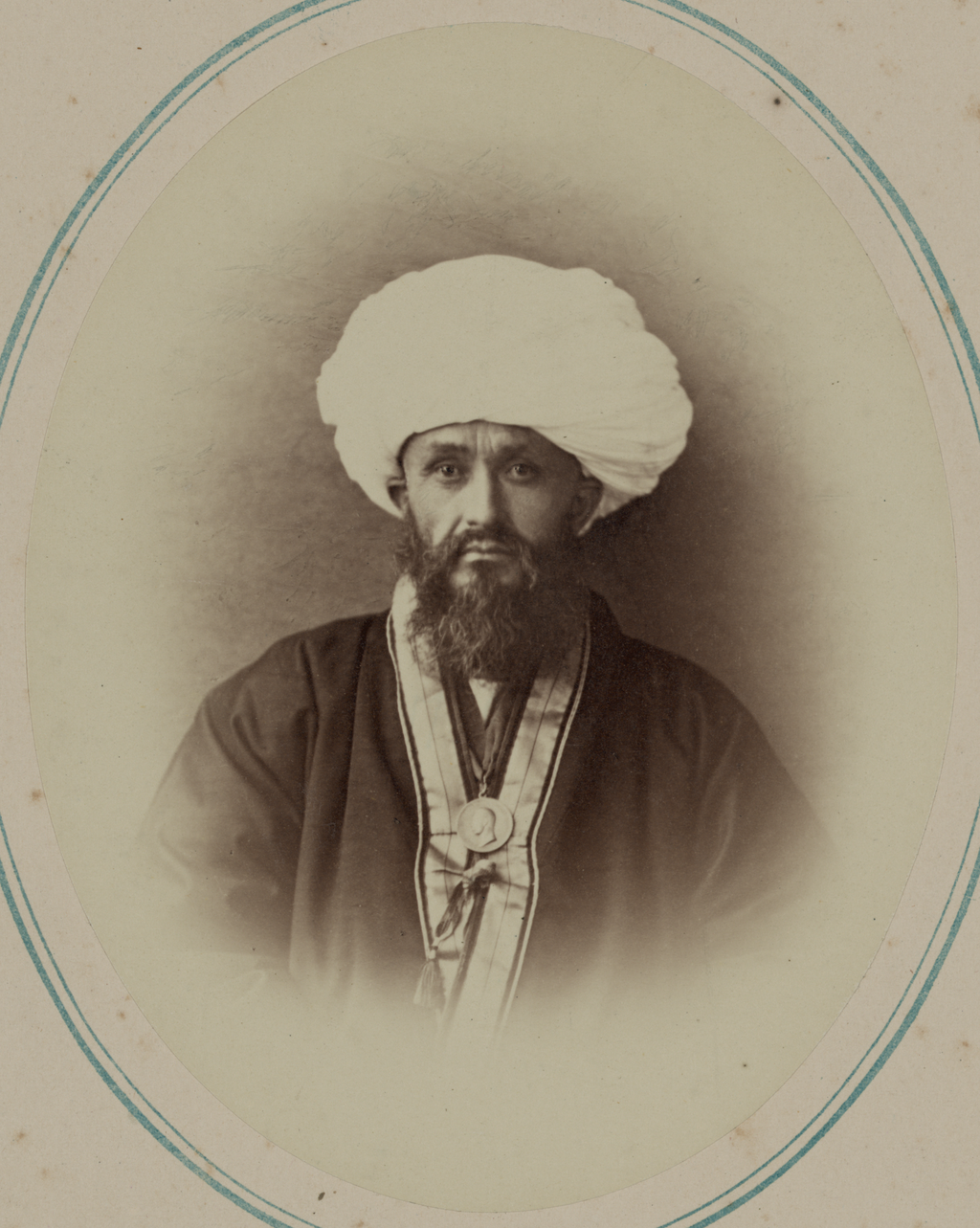
A Tajik qadi (judge) of Urateppe. Photograph taken between 1865–1872

In Kokand and other towns, the qadi-kalan was in command of the qadi (judges in Islamic jurisprudence), while the khwajah-kalan served as the primary religious counselor for the khan's court. Typically, the leaders of the provinces and towns were referred to as hakims or kushbegis. Kokand, Marghilan, Andijan, Namangan, and later Tashkent were the principal provinces of the khanate. Smaller districts known as bekliks were governed by begs or dadkhahs, who were obligated to make one or two annual visits to the khan's court. The Qipchaq and Uzbek tribal confederacies were typically associated with the provinces. For example, Marghilan and Osh were populated by Turks, Urateppe was ruled by the Iuz Uzbeks, and Namangan was reportedly under Qipchaq influence.

The Kokand khanate was similar to its predecessors in numerous aspects, including its internal organization. Civilian and military personnel held Perso-Islamic and Turco-Mongol titles, and Kokand served as the residence of the khan. Ming-bashi was the highest ranking post of a civil administrator, while the askar-bashi or parwanachi was the commander of the army. Tajiks continued to make up the majority of scribes and Muslim clergy.

Some rulers of Kokand modeled their administration on Timurid practices, supporting a wide spectrum of groups—from tribal leaders and the military to Sufi brotherhoods, orthodox religious scholars, poets, intellectuals, and artists. Kokand's history was marked by efforts at centralization, but these actions did not produce a state structure corresponding to the modern concept of a centralized state. The comparison is limited to this distinction, since early modern technological developments presented Kokand rulers with both new opportunities and complications, whereas the medieval Timurid Empire was founded on nomadic military might.

== Military ==
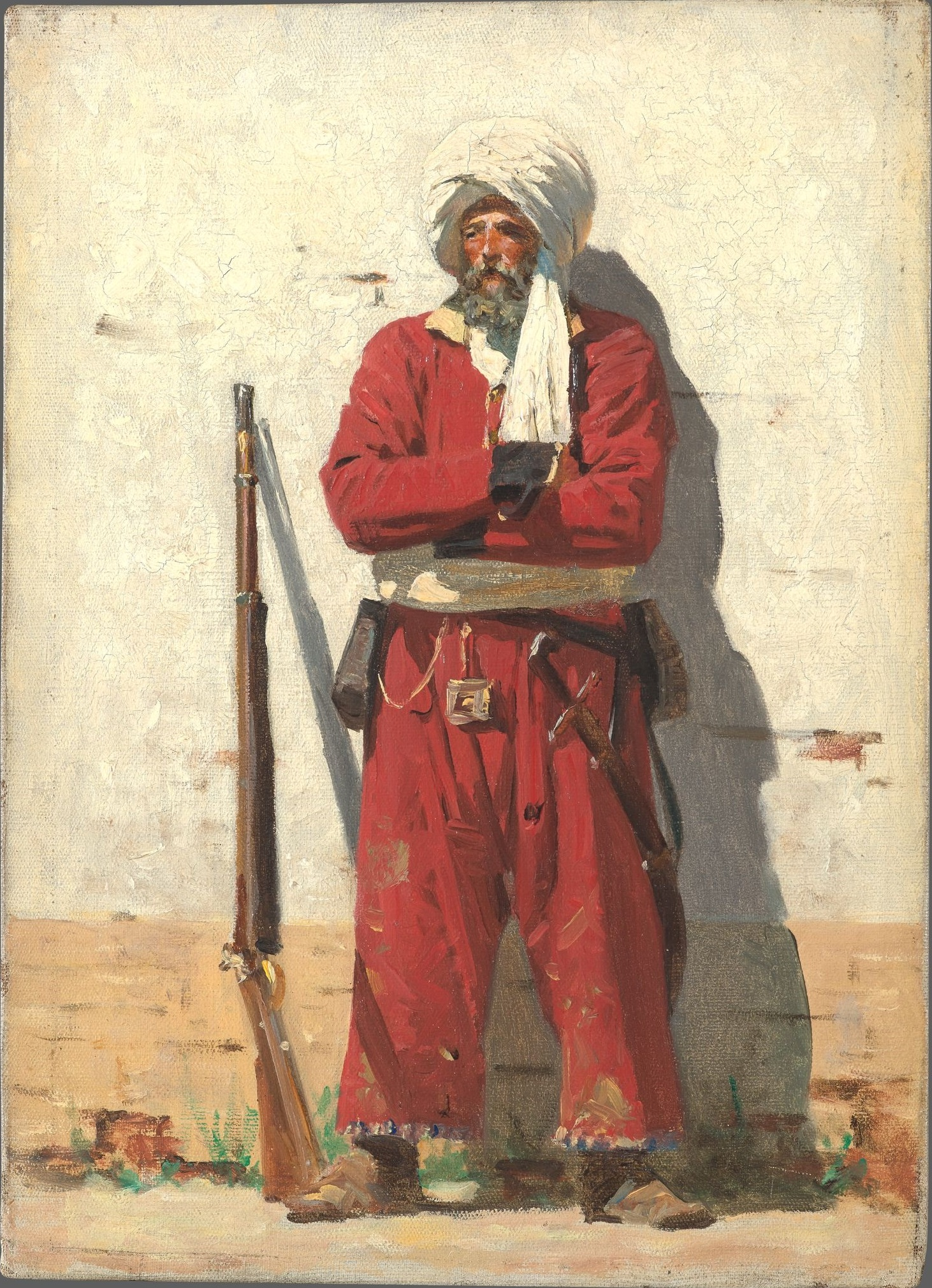
Kokand soldier by the Russian painter Vasily Vereshchagin, dated 1873

Between 20,000 and 30,000 Uzbek irregulars made up Kokand's army under Narbuta Bey; these troops, known as the Qaraqazan ("Black Scorpion"), relied mainly on plunder as their form of payment. Alim Khan realized that his ambitions to consolidate power would be thwarted by this structure, even though the army had demonstrated its efficacy in the Fergana valley. Alim Khan sought to make use of on the significant advancements in military technology that had occurred over the previous century. He understood that a standing army, properly armed with muskets, cannons, and gunpowder and trained to use them effectively, was essential for Kokand to reach its full potential.

Alim Khan abandoned the long-standing custom of Turks being prioritzed in the military, possibly inspired by the Ottoman practice of recruiting the Janissaries from Balkan Christian captives with no ties to Turkic tribes. He designed a military system that prioritized technology and loyalty over traditional tactics, and formed the Gala Bahadur, a unique musketeer force composed of 10,000–20,000 devoted "slave soldiers". 6,000 of these soldiers were Pamiris, referred to as "Ghalcha". Because they were Ismaili Shias, the Pamiris were branded heretics by neighboring Sunnis and considered legitimate targets for enslavement. They were forced to leave their homeland in the Pamir Mountains and move to the Fergana Valley, where they became completely reliant on Alim Khan and deeply devoted to him.

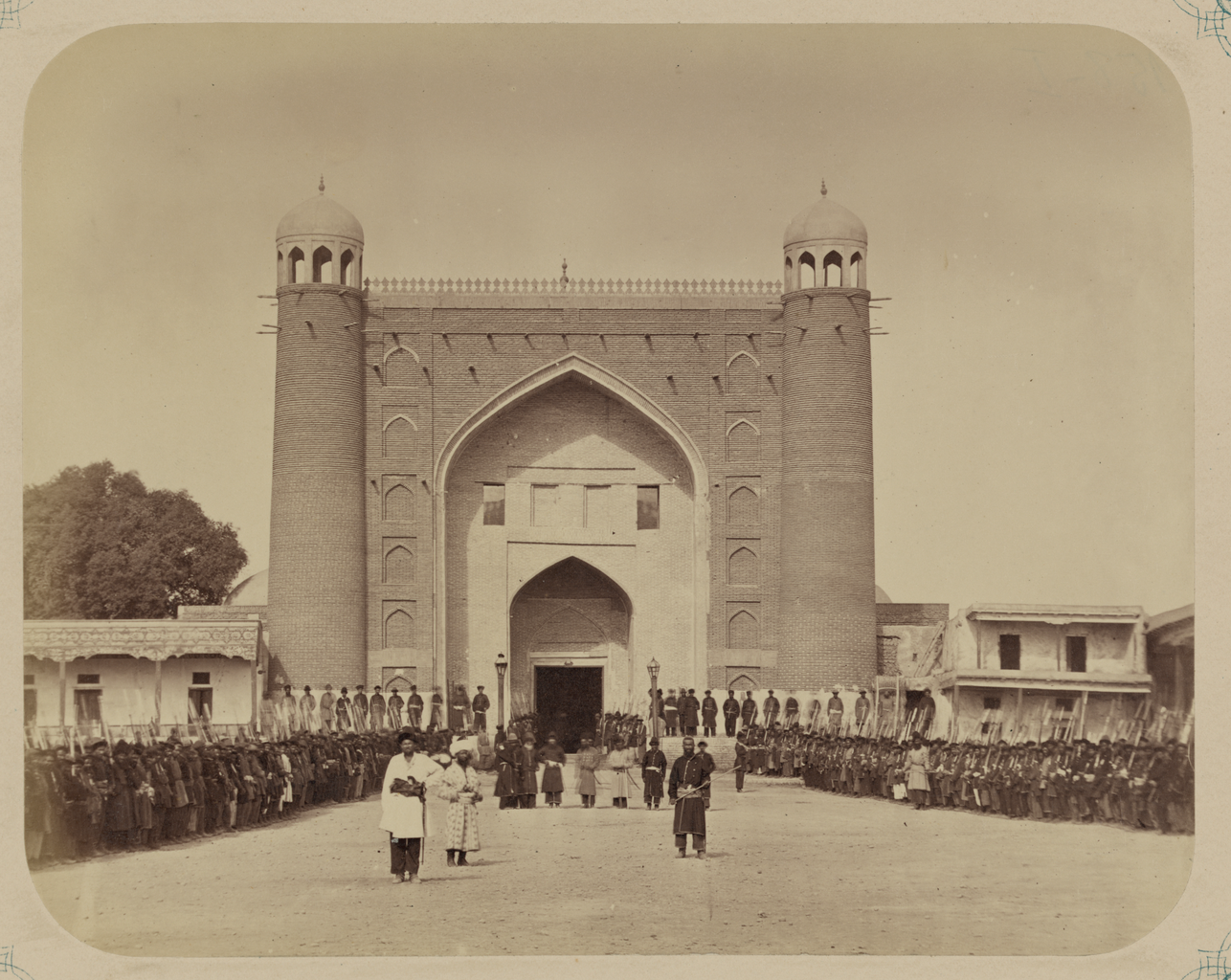
Exterior view of the Kokand palace, with Kokand soldiers standing outside the entrance. Photograph taken between 1865–1872

The Gala Bahadur became known as the Sipah-i Jadid ("New Army") and coexisted with the older force, the Sipah-i Kuhna ("Old Army"). In order to secure the protection he required to carry out his extremely radical political reforms, Alim Khan had spent a significant amount of money equipping and training his Ghalcha slave-troops. However, the Ghalcha was later dismissed by Muhammad Umar Khan, who wanted to regain the trust of the Uzbek tribes. The importance of equipping forces with more modern weapons was still recognized by Muhammad Umar Khan, and by Madali Khan. Kokand's territorial growth had benefited greatly from this investment.

Most of the Kokand firearms came from the Indian subcontinent and were of poor quality, a mixed collection of basic cannons and old-style matchlock and flintlock muskets. Although the weapon technology of the Russians was not as advanced as Western Europe's in the first half of the 19th century, it still greatly outmatched Kokand's army.

In 1860, Russian geographer and general Mikhail Ivanovich Venyukov surveyed the Kokand fortifications along the Chu River, mentioning fortresses like Toqmaq and Pishpek, separated from the Kokand khanate by the Qara-Tau mountains. He considered the forts weak, with small, poorly armed garrisons, and criticized the combat ability and clothing of the Kokandi troops.

== Irrigation and agriculture ==
From the reign of Narbuta Biy and onwards, the Fergana Valley's irrigation systems was developed by the Shahrukhids. Kokand was responsible for the construction and upkeep of hundreds of miles of irrigation canals for about a century. Communities that stood to profit from these projects were generally responsible for providing the vast workforce needed to carry them out. Much of the valley’s wilderness, pasture, and brush was ultimately transformed into arable land, which could then support migrant farming communities or provide settlements for nomadic and semi-nomadic populations. The framework for the cotton economy in the region that would develop in the late 19th and early 20th centuries was primarily built by the Khanate of Kokand.

Numerous political and economic advantages resulted from these efforts. In order to maintain control over its subjects and boost agricultural income, Kokand utilized its power to grant or refuse access to irrigation canals. To help Kokand's agriculture sector grow, invitations were extended to Indian merchants and moneylenders, who had previously been involved in the Bukharan Khanate as dealers and financiers of agricultural production.

== List of khans ==
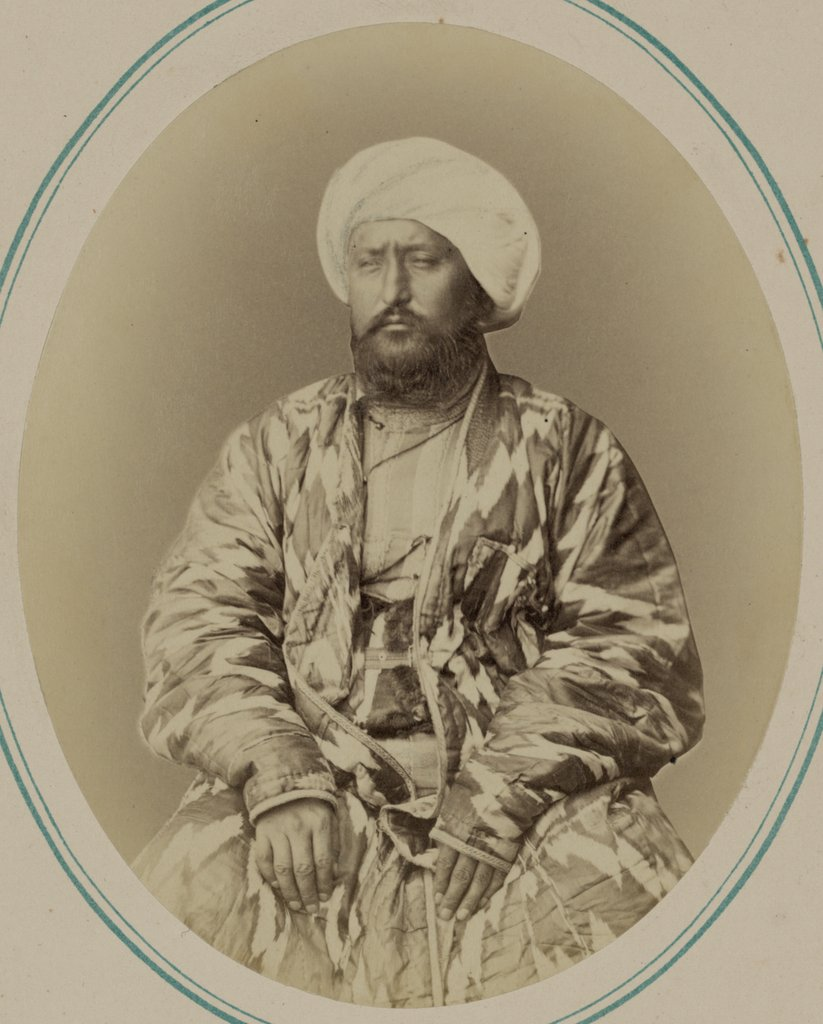
Seyid Muhammad Khudayar Khan, the 1860s

Reign	Ruler
1709–1722	Shahrukh Biy
1722–1734	Abd al-Rahim Biy
1734–1751	Abd al-Karim Biy
1751–1752	Irdana Biy (1st Reign)
1752–1753	Baba Biy
1753–1769	Irdana Biy (2nd Reign)
1769–1770	Sulayman Biy
1770–1799	Narbuta Biy
1799–1811	Alim Khan
1811–1822	Muhammad Umar Khan
1822–1842	Muhammad Ali Khan
1842–1844	Shir Ali Khan
1844	Murad Beg Khan
1844–1852	Muhammad Khudayar Khan (1st Reign)
	Mingbashi Musulmonqul (Regent for Khudayar Khan)
1852–1858	Muhammad Khudayar Khan (2nd Reign)
1858–1862	Muhammad Mallya Beg Khan
1862	Shah Murad Khan
1862–1863	Muhammad Khudayar Khan (3rd Reign)
1863–1865	Sultan Sayyid Khan (puppet of Alimqul)
1865	Bil Bahchi Khan
1865–1875	Muhammad Khudayar Khan (4th Reign)
1875	Nasruddin Khan (1st Reign)
1875	Muhammad Pulad Beg Khan
1876	Nasruddin Khan (2nd Reign)

== Genealogy of the Shahrukhid dynasty ==
Shahrukhid Dynasty

Khanate of Kokand

Shah-Rukh r. 1709–1721
Abdur-Rahim r. 1721–1734	Abdul-Karim r. 1734–1751	Shadi
Irdana r. 1751–1752, 1753–1769	Baba r. 1752–1753	Abdur-Rahman r. 1751–1751	Sulayman r. 1769–1770
Narbutah r. 1770–1799	Hajji
Alim r. 1799–1811	Umar r. 1811–1822	Shir-Ali r. 1842–1844
Murad r. 1844–1844	Ali r. 1822–1842	Sarimsaq	Malla r. 1858–1862	Khudayar r. 1844–1858, 1862–1862 r. 1865–1875
Shah-Murad r. 1862–1862	Sultan r. 1862–1865	Nasr ad-Din r. 1875–1876

== See also ==
- List of Sunni dynasties
- Emirate of Bukhara
- Khanate of Khiva
- Russian Turkestan
- Turkestan Autonomy (Kokand Autonomy)
