= Kokand =

City in Fergana Region, eastern Uzbekistan

Kokand Qo‘qon / Қўқон (Uzbek)
- District-level city
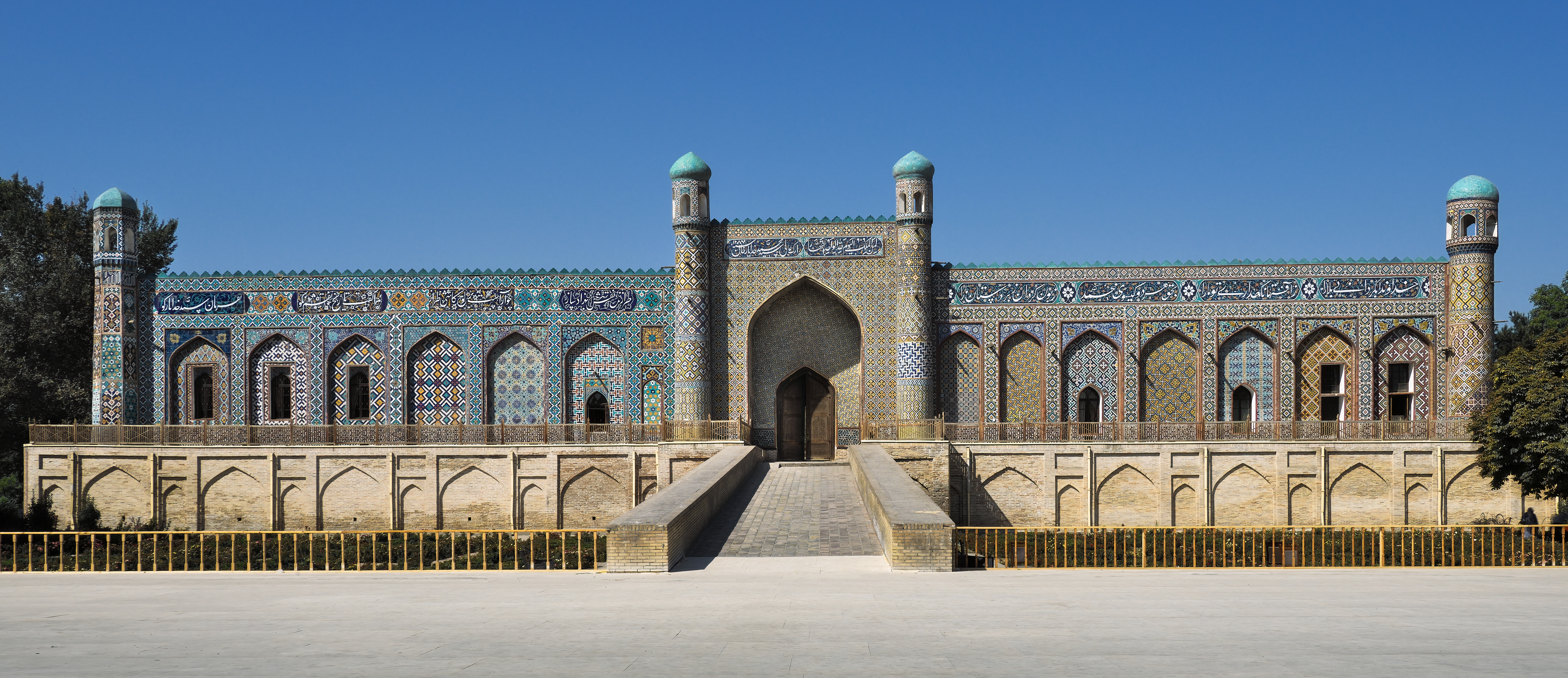
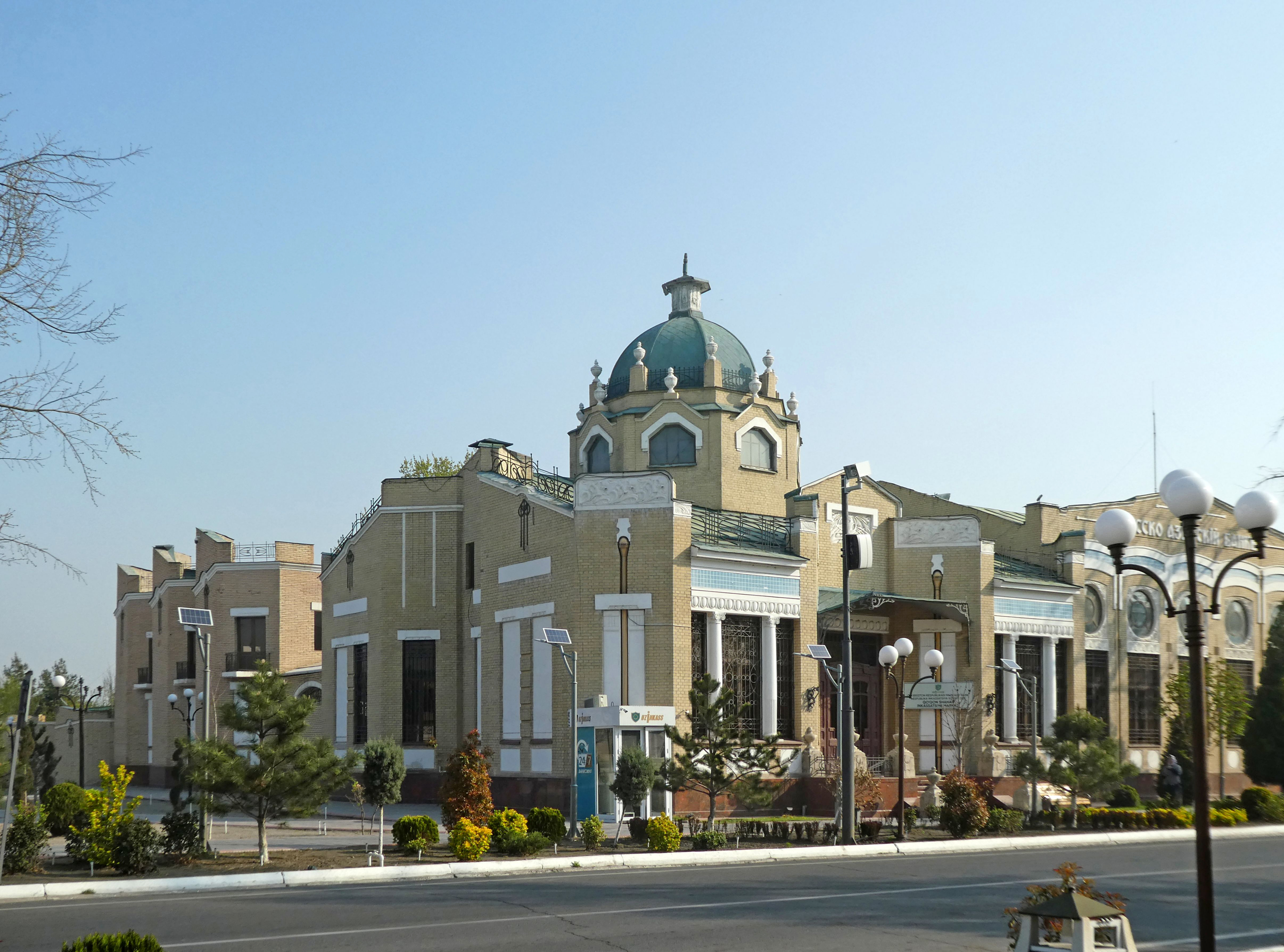
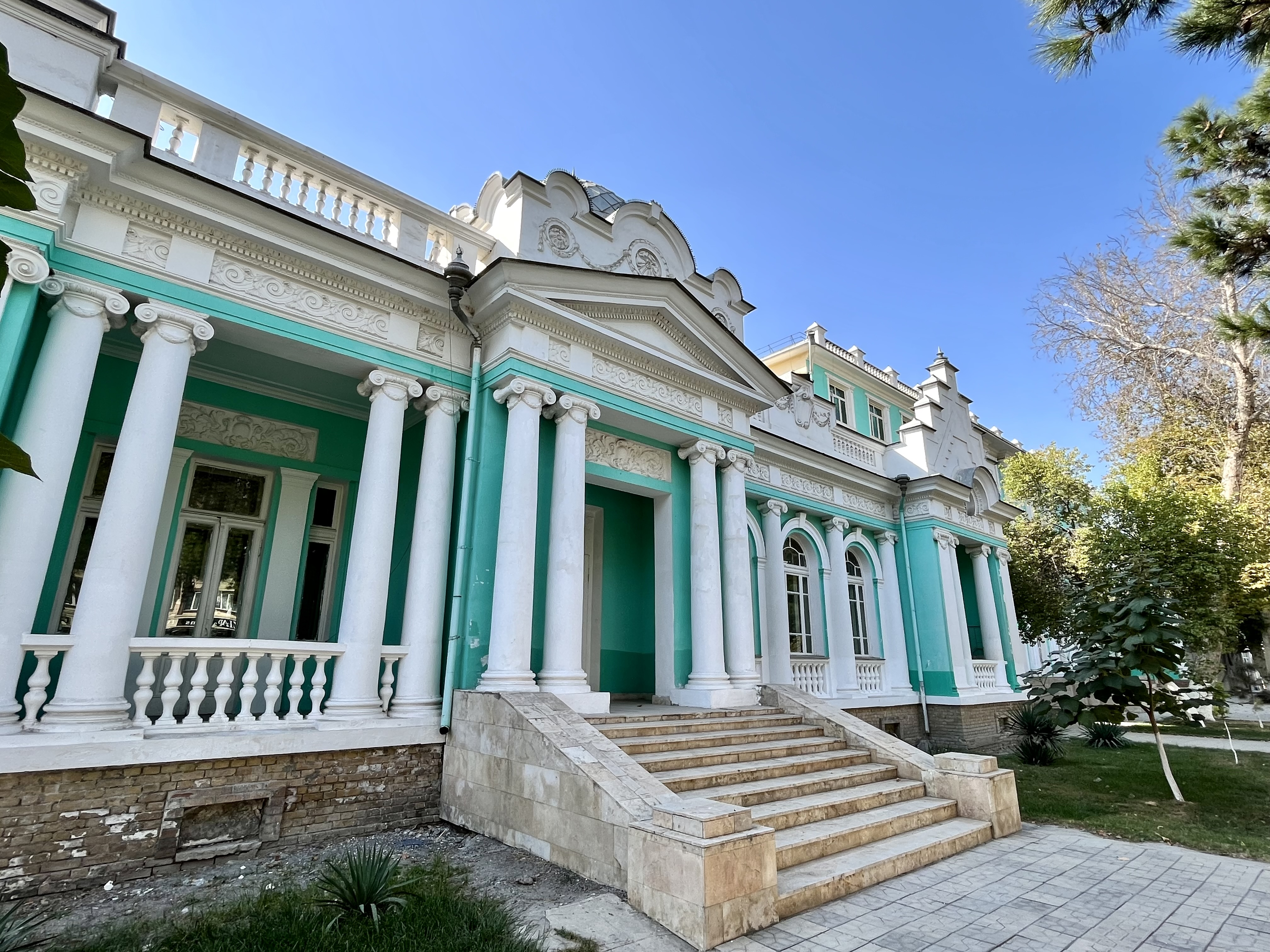
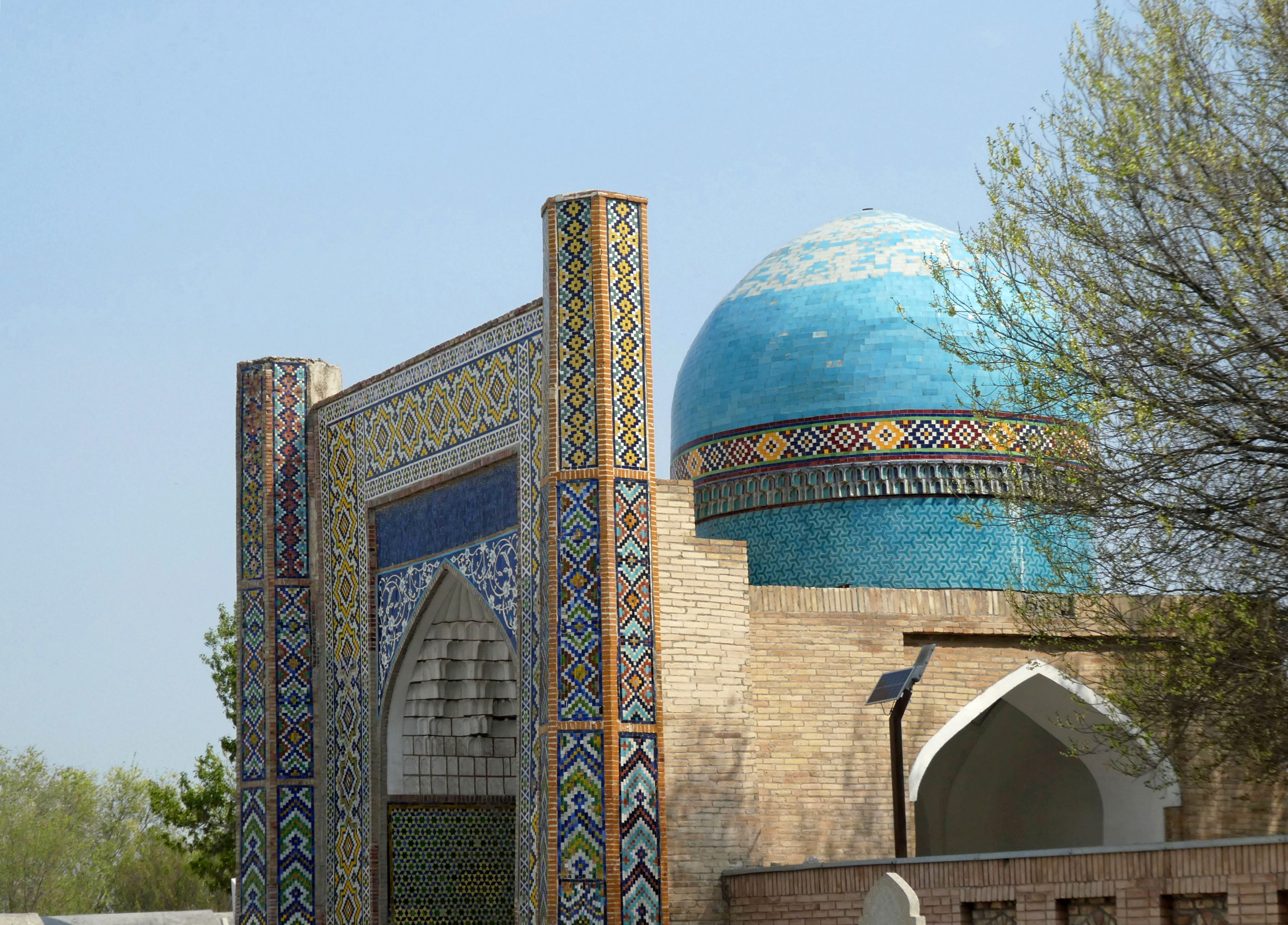
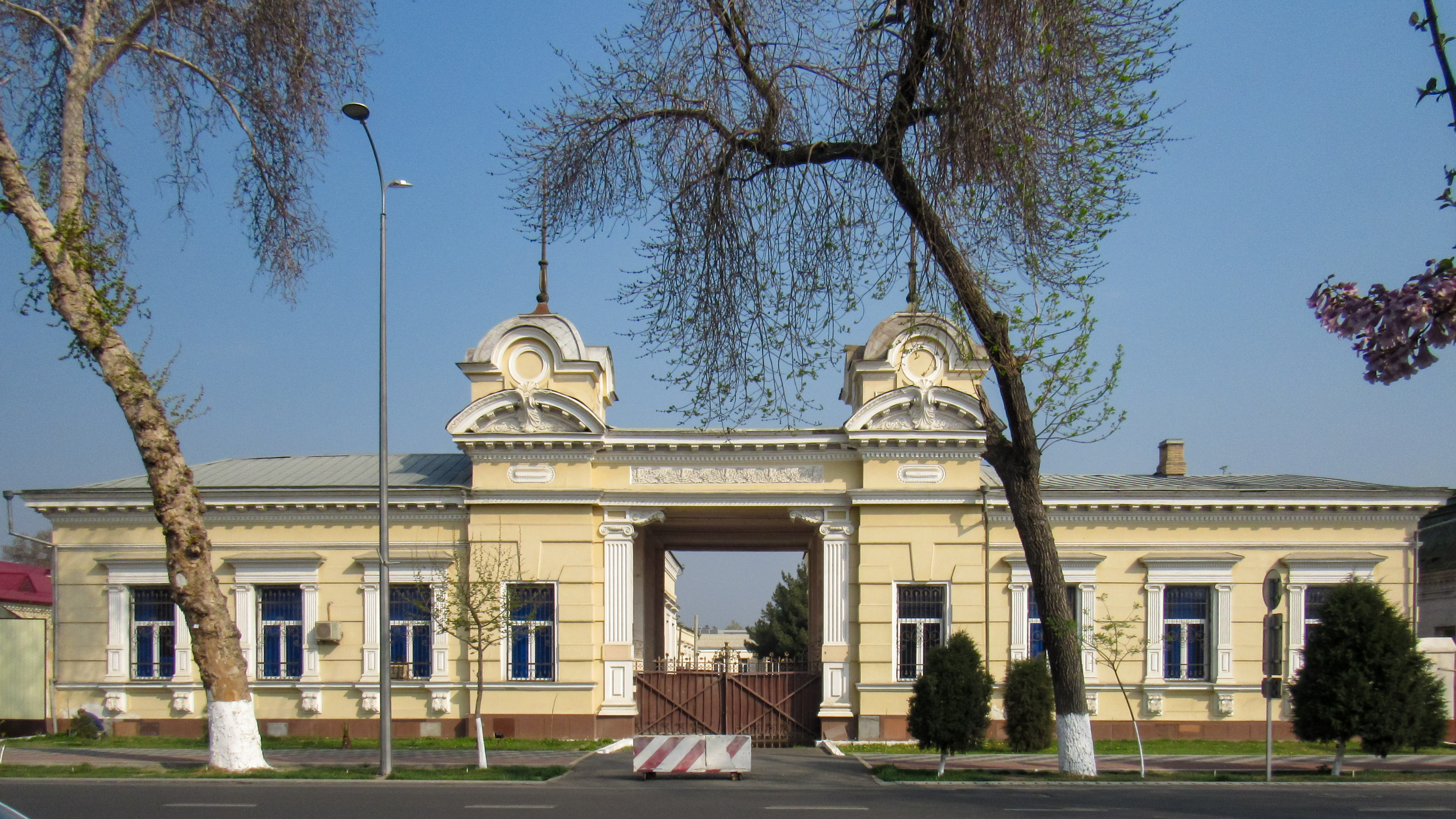
- Khudayar Khan Palace Russo-Asian Bank House of Simkhaev Madari Khan Mausoleum House of the Krafts

- Location in Uzbekistan Kokand (West and Central Asia)
- Coordinates: 40°31′43″N 70°56′33″E
- Country: Uzbekistan
- Region: Fergana
- Founded: 2nd century BC

Government
  - Type: City Administration
  - Mayor: Ma'rufjon Usmonov

Area
  - Total: 40 km^{2} (15 sq mi)
- Elevation: 409 m (1,342 ft)

Population (2026)
  - Total: 322,100
  - Density: 8,100/km^{2} (21,000/sq mi)
- Demonym(s): Qo'qonlik (Uzbek); Khoqandi
- Time zone: UTC+05:00
  - Summer (DST): UZT
- Postal code: 150700
- Area code: (+998) 73
- Website: qoqon.uz/en/

Kokand (/ˈkoʊkænd/ KOH-kand) (Note: Uzbek: Қўқон, romanized: Qo‘qon, IPA: [qoˈqɒn]; Russian: Коканд [kɐˈkant]; Tajik: Қӯқанд, romanized: Qo‘qand; Persian: خوقند, romanized: Xuqand; Kazakh: Қоқан, romanized: Qoqan; Chagatay: خوقند, romanized: Xuqand; Kyrgyz: Кокон, romanized: Kokon) is a city in Fergana Region in eastern Uzbekistan, at the southwestern edge of the Fergana Valley. Administratively, Kokand is a district-level city, that includes the urban-type settlement Muqimiy. The population of Kokand as of 2022 was approximately 322,100. The city lies 228 km (142 mi) southeast of Tashkent, 115 km (71 mi) west of Andijan, and 88 km (55 mi) west of Fergana. It is nicknamed "City of Winds".

In 1877, when the first ethnographic works were done under the new imperial Russian administration, Kokand was reported and visually depicted on their maps as Tajik inhabited oasis (C.E de Ujfalvy ("Carte Ethnographique du Ferghanah, 1877"). The city, along with most of the eastern Fergana Valley, was included in the Uzbek Soviet Socialist Republic in the 1920s as part of national delimitation in the Soviet Union.

Kokand is at the crossroads of the two main ancient trade routes into the Fergana Valley, one leading northwest over the mountains to Tashkent, and the other west through Khujand. As a result, Kokand is the main transportation hub in the Fergana Valley.

== Etymology ==
The city's name is in conformity with other Central Asian cities that sport the element kand/kent/qand/jand, meaning "a city" in Sogdian as well as other Iranic languages. The Khwarazmian version was kath, which is still found in the name of the old city of Akhsikath/Akhsikat in the Fergana Valley of Uzbekistan. The prefix khu/hu is Iranic might stand "good" (as in modern Tajik khub), and would therefore translate as "good city".

Another explanation claims a Turkic derivation, and might refer to the "tribal family group of 'Kokan' who belong to the Kongrat tribe of Uzbeks".

== History ==
=== Early history ===
The town of Kokand is one of the oldest towns in Uzbekistan and is situated in the western part of Fergana Valley. In the chronicles of the 10th century, the first written documents concerning town of Hukande, Havokande (old names of the town). In the 13th century, like most of Central Asian towns, the Mongols ruined the city. The town is a significant hub for trading on the Silk Route.

Kokand has existed since at least the 10th century, under the name of Khavakand, and was frequently mentioned in traveler's accounts of the caravan route between South Asia and East Asia. The Han dynasty of China conquered the entire city in the 1st century BC. Later, the Arabs conquered the region from Tang Empire. The Mongols destroyed Kokand in the 13th century.

The present city began as a fort in 1732 on the site of another older fortress called Eski-Kurgan. In 1740, it became the capital of an Uzbek kingdom, the Khanate of Kokand, which reached as far as Kyzylorda to the west and Bishkek to the northeast. Kokand was also the major religious center of the Fergana Valley, boasting more than 300 mosques.

=== Russian colonial period ===
Imperial forces of Russian Empire under Mikhail Skobelev captured the city in 1883 which then became part of Russian Turkistan. During World War I, two revolutions happened in the Russian Empire. it was the capital of the short-lived (72 days) (1917–18) anti-Bolshevik Provisional Government of Autonomous Turkistan (also known as Kokand Autonomy). They sought co-operation from Ataman Dutov and Alash Orda. However, their emissary to the Amir of Bukhara achieved little.

In September 1918, Bolsheviks burned down the city and massacred over ten thousand citizens during their campaign against the Basmachi movement.

In the state of Dayuan

Archaeological research of Muyi Mubarak, Tepakurgan, Eski Kurgan and other monuments located in the city of Kokand revealed traces of earlier civilizations.

In Muyi Mubarak were found several clay shards of the 5th to 6th centuries; a clay platform, which in the 5th to 7th centuries served as the base of a monumental building; the remains of a fortress wall, built in the 1st to 2nd centuries of pahsa and mudbricks, which functioned for more than 400 years. At a depth of 5 meters, a lower cultural layer with materials dating back 2,000 years was discovered.

In Tepakurgan, located in the center of the city, a platform from the Early Middle Ages, which served as the base of a monumental castle with semicircular towers, was discovered, as in Muyi Mubarak.

The obtained artifacts give grounds to say that not later than the 7th century BC a certain part of the territory of the present city was developed for irrigated agriculture.

And the city appeared not later than the 2nd half of the 2nd century BC and was the center of the Sokh oasis, that is, the capital of the regional possession, which was part of the confederal state of Fergana ("Dayuan" of Chinese annals).

Havokand or Hokand

Arab geographers and travelers of the 10th century, Al-Istakhri and Ibn Haukal mention the city of Khovakand or Khokand, which in distance corresponds to the present Kokand.

According to written sources and local legends, there were ancient cities of Akhsikath, Kubo (Quva), Rishton, Osh, Bab (Pop), Koson (Kashan), Mo-ar-gilon (Margilan), Andigan (Andijan), Uzgen, Isfara, Varukh, Sokh, Konibodom and Khujand in Fergana already at the time of its conquest by Arabs who established Islam here (in the beginning of the 8th century).

Arab travelers of the 10th century mention many other towns and generally notice that, besides towns, there were many large villages in Fergana.

Havokand or Hokand, located on the Silk Road between India and China on one side and Persia and the Near East on the other, may have been a major trade center of its time. It was destroyed by the mongolic peoples in the 13th century.

== Main sights ==
=== The Palace of Khudayar Khan ===
The Palace of Khudayar Khan was built between 1863 and 1874 by ruler Muhammad Khudayar Khan. American diplomat Eugene Schulyer described it as being "much larger and more magnificent than any other [palace] in Central Asia.”

Khudayar Khan commissioned architect Mir Ubaydullo to build him a royal residence with 114 rooms set around seven courtyards. The ruler wanted his mother to live in one of the palace's grand buildings, but she refused and set up her yurt in a courtyard.

The facade of the building is decorated with mosaic tiles and an Arabic inscription above the entrance. The inscription translates as “The High palace of Seid Mohammad Khudayar Khan”.

Most of the palace, including its harem, was demolished by the Soviets, but 19 rooms remain in palace. These are open to the public, and the interiors have been partially restored. They show a combination of Russian and traditional Uzbek styles, and the exquisite craftsmanship of Kokand's 19th-century artisans. It is possible to view the palace's collection of Chinese ceramics on request.

=== Juma Mosque ===
Kokand's Juma Mosque (Friday Mosque) is located on Chursu Square in the historic Icheri Sheher part of the city. It was built between 1812 and 1818 by Muhammad Umar Khan, who was ruler of Kokand from 1810 until his death in 1822.

The mosque is built around a large courtyard and has a 100m long iwan supported on 98 redwood columns, which are ornately carved and were brought from India. The minaret is 22m high.

Although intended to be Kokand's main place of worship, the Juma Mosque remained shut for most of the 20th century. It then reopened after much needed restoration in 1989 and now houses a small museum of applied arts with displays of embroideries and ceramics.

=== Amin Beg Madrassah ===
The Amin Beg Madrassah, a religious school, was built in the 1830s for a son of Madali Khan, the khan of Kokand from 1822 to 1842. The madrassah has a beautifully tiled facade, which was restored in 1913 by a craftsman called Khomol Khozi. For this reason, the madrassah is often called the Khomol Khozi Madrassah. Today, the building houses a shop and small museum, where the impressive tiles and the carved wooden columns can be viewed.

=== Hamza Museum ===
Built in 1989, the Hamza Museum is named after Hamza Hakimzade Niyazi, a Soviet hero who was born in Kokand. Hamza was Uzbekistan's first national poet and the founder of Uzbek social realism, and the museum was opened to commemorate the centenary of his birth. The museum houses general exhibits about life in Kokand, and also has artefacts relating to a variety of dramatists, propagandists, and writers.

Central Stadium (FC Kokand 1912 Stadium)

The Central Stadium was built in 1932 and was completely renovated in 2012. It has a modern lighting system and a high-quality natural grass surface. The stadium has a capacity of 12,278 spectators and is considered one of the most modern sports facilities.

=== Additional Sites ===
There are three other historic madrassahs in Kokand. The 19th-century Shaib Mian Hazrat Madrasa has a small museum dedicated to the poet Mohammad Amin Muqimi (1850–1903).

The Narbutabey Madrassah was built in the 1790s. Its graveyard includes the tomb of Muhammad Umar Khan and his wife, the famous Uzbek poet Nodira. Known as the Modari Khan Mausoleum, it is ornately decorated with glazed blue mosaic tiles. Unlike the other madrassahs in Kokand, which were closed by the Soviets, the Narbutabey Madrassah remained active as a place of Quranic study until 2016.

The last madrassah is the Dasturkahanchi Madrasa. It was built in 1833 as a school for boys, but it is now a training centre where girls learn embroidery.

- Dakhma-I-Shokhon, a necropolis of the Kokand Khans from the 1830.

== Education and culture ==
A number of madrasahs can be found with the city. Kokand made contribution to Islam. It is also home to a number of notable hanafi scholars, such as Abdulhafiz Al-Quqoniy and Yorqinjon Qori Al-Quqoniy.

There are 3 institutes there are "Kokand branch of Tashkent State Technical University(named after Islom Karimov)", "Kokand University(founded in 2019)", "Kokand State Pedagocical Institute", 9 colleges and lyceums, 40 secondary schools, 5 musical schools, a theater, and 20 libraries. There are 7 historical and house museums located in Kokand.

The first International Handicrafters Festival took place in Kokand in September 2019. It was hosted by the Uzbekistan Handicraft Association, and the guest of honour was Rosy Greenlees, President of the World Crafts Council. More than 600 creatives from 70 countries participated.

The festival was created to enable artisans from around the world to demonstrate and sell their products, as well as to network and further develop their skills. The festival included conference sessions dedicated to developing hand craftsmanship. The crafts on display included musical instruments, painting, ceramics, textiles, metalwork, and woodwork.

It is planned that the festival will be a biennial event, and it will next take place in 2021.

== Economy ==
The black market provides nearly 75% of the income generated in the borders of the city. This includes retail, groceries, employment, money exchange, agriculture and manufacturing of many goods. A large part of the population works as small business owners in outdoor markets.

Kokand is a center for the manufacture of fertilizers, chemicals, machinery, and cotton and food products. Over the last two decades, new districts and public buildings have been created in the city as well as many houses, shops, cafes, restaurants and other private sector ventures. Kokand is an education center with one institute, nine colleges and lyceums, and numerous museums.

== Notable people ==
- Muhammad Sharif Gulkhani, poet and satirist
- Ziroat Mirziyoyeva, First Lady of Uzbekistan
- Peter Mikhailovich Kulakov, television evangelist
- Ida Mayrin (born 1997), Israeli Olympic rhythmic gymnast
- Yodgor Nasriddinova, Uzbek-Soviet engineer and communist party official
- Abdulla Qahhor, Uzbek writer
- Hamza Hakimzade Niyazi, Uzbek poet and playwright
- Saida Mirziyoyeva, Uzbek politician, eldest daughter of the President of Uzbekistan
- Furqat, Uzbek poet
- Abraham Resnick, rabbi
- Serhiy Shkarlet, Ukrainian politician
- Mukhtorkhon Tashkhodjaev, Uzbek politician, Chairman of the National Paralympic Committee of Uzbekistan
