= Kokand campaign (1875–1876) =

- Part of the Russian conquest of Central Asia
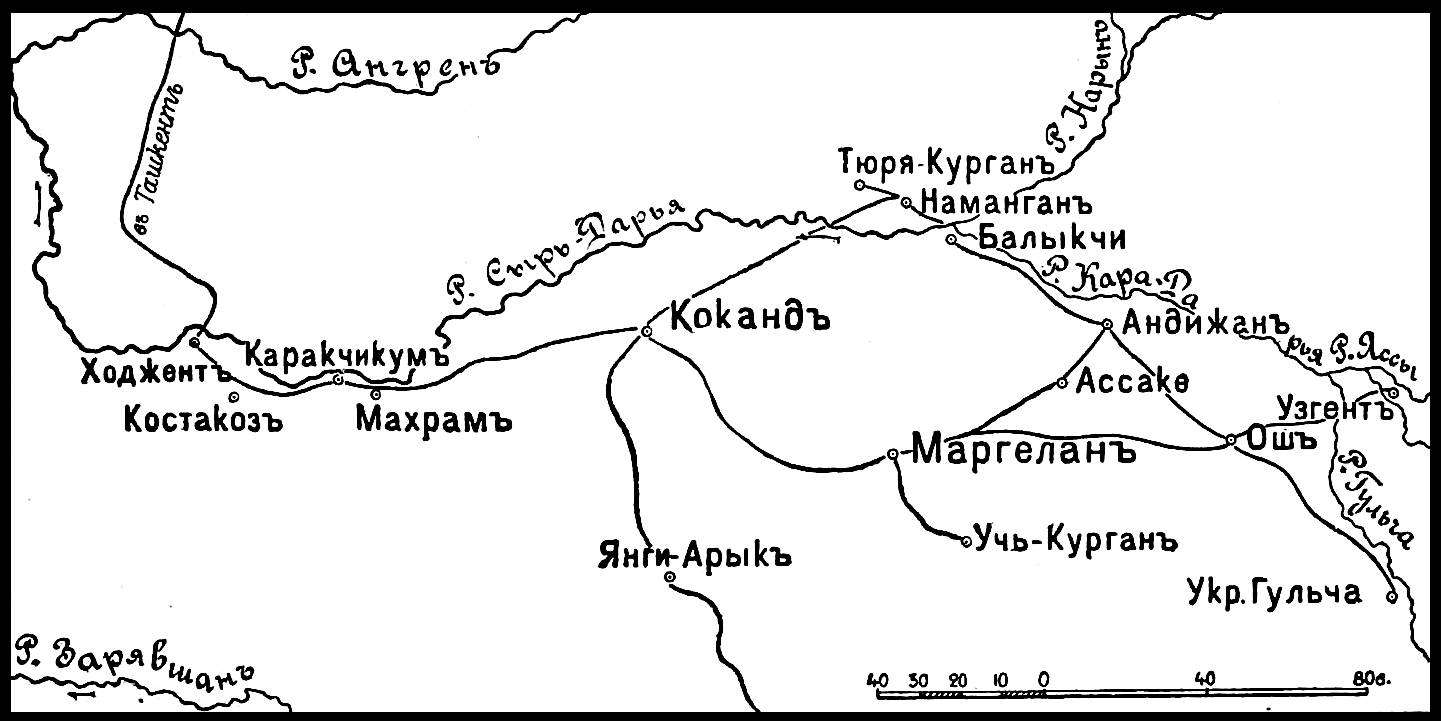
- Theatre of military operations in Kokand (Map from the article «Kokand expedition 1875-76» in «"Sytin's Military Encyclopedia".»)
Date	1875–1876
Location	Khanate of Kokand
Result	Russian victory
Territorial changes	Russians annexes the Khanate of Kokand

Belligerents
(Khanate of Kokand) Khudayar Khan loyalists Russian Empire	(Khanate of Kokand) Pulad Khan loyalists

Commanders and leaders
(Khanate of Kokand) Muhammad Khudayar Khan; (Khanate of Kokand) Abd al-Rahman Aftabachi (Note: Aftabachi fought for Khudayar Khan from 1873 to 1874; after defecting, he served on the rebel side from 1875 until his surrender in 1876.); Konstantin Kaufmann; Mikhail Skobelev; Nikolai Golovachev; Vitaly Trotsky; Alexander Khoroshkhin †	(Khanate of Kokand) Pulad Khan (executed); (Khanate of Kokand) Nasruddin Khan (surrendered); (Khanate of Kokand) Abd al-Rahman Aftabachi (surrendered); (Khanate of Kokand) Muhammad Amin Bek

Strength
	c. 60,000 – 70,000 rebels

Casualties and losses
	5,800+ killed

The Kokand campaign of 1875–1876 (in Russian: Кокандский поход 1875–1876 гг.), was a military expedition of the troops of the Russian Empire with the aim of conquering the Khanate of Kokand between 1875 and 1876.

== Background ==
During the mid-1800s, the Russian Empire invaded and occupied much of Central Asia. In 1865, the Russian Empire occupied the major Kokand city Tashkent, and soon after annexed the region. In January 1868, Governor-General of Russian Turkestan Konstantin Petrovich von Kaufman forced the Khan of Kokand, Khudayar Khan to accept a treaty allowing Russian merchants extra permissions to reside in and travel in Kokand. This effectively reduced Kokand to a vassal of the Russian Empire. Kokand was extremely unstable and continued to rebel against Russian rule.

== History ==
=== Overthrowing of Khudayar Khan ===
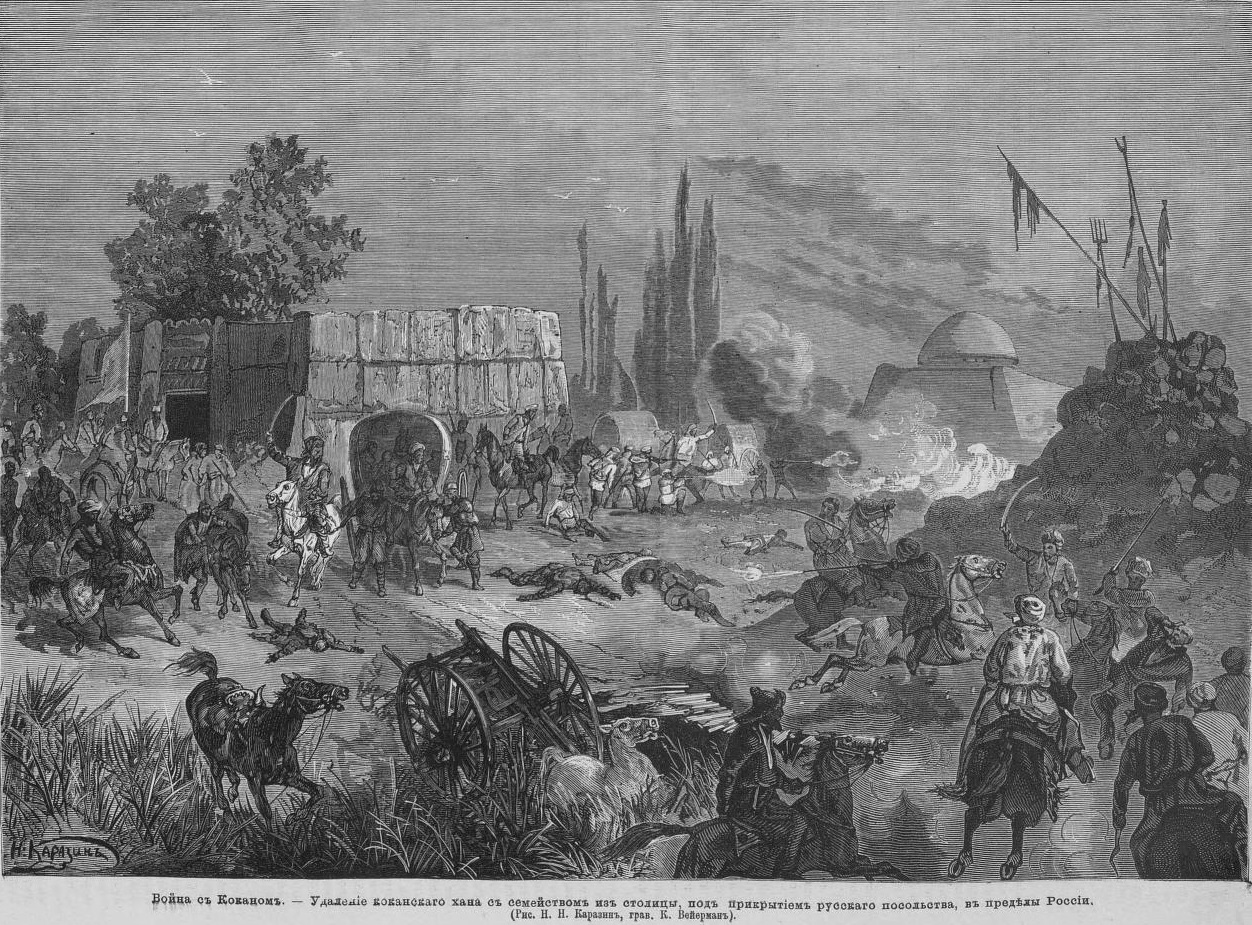
Vsemirnaya Illyustratsiya: Departure of the Kokand Khan from Kokand, 1875.

By 1875, Khudayar Khan had drastically increased taxes to fund the army, increasing resentment against him. Specifically, he imposed an inheritance tax, which was widely criticized by the ulama for going against fiqh. Tensions were also possibly inflamed when a Russian delegation arrived in Kokand on July 13, with rumors spreading that since the Russians supported Khudayar Khan, they were responsible for the countries financial problems. By mid-July, Abd al-Rahman Aftabachi and 4,000 soldiers under him defected to the rebels, possibly due to anti-Russian sentiments, but more likely because Khudayar Khan killed his father. Upon hearing of the inflamed tensions, Russian forces began preparing an invasion of the Kokandi border fortress Makhram.`

Russians would begin to believe that the rebellion was not directed at Khudayar Khan, but was rather a religious uprising against Russia. Khudayar Khan, realizing that this belief would increase the likelihood of Russian support, claimed that the rebellion was a "jihad against the Russians", and promoted the idea.

The leader of the Kirghiz, Mullah Ishak Hasan-uulu, declared himself a distant relative of Pulat Khan. The Khan's son, Nasruddin Khan, who was with a 5,000-strong army in Andijan, also went over to the side of the conspirators. The cities of Osh and Namangan opened their gates to them. On August 1, it became known that the rebels had entered Margilan without a fight, just 77 km from Kokand, and Mullah Issa-Auliye called on the people to wage war against the Russians and their accomplices. Weinberg immediately sent a letter to General Golovachev, describing the situation and asking him to send a detachment from Khujand to protect the Khan.

On the night of August 3, the rebels approached Kokand. Half of the khan's army immediately went over to their side, along with Khudoyar's second son, Muhammad Alim-bek. In the morning, unrest began among the townspeople. Khudoyar decided to take refuge under the protection of the Russian authorities. At the head of an 8,000-strong army with 68 cannons and a caravan loaded with treasures from the treasury, he moved along the road to Khujand. The Russian embassy also went with the khan: Weinberg, Skobelev, 22 Cossacks, 9 merchants and 6 Kazakh caravan drivers. Six kilometers from Kokand, the khan stopped to give battle to the rebels, but his entire army, like the others, went over to the enemy's side. Only his retinue of about 500 people and the Russian embassy remained with Khudoyar. Subjected to constant attacks by the rebels, the small detachment was able to reach the territory controlled by Russian troops by the evening of August 4, and the next day arrived in Khujand.

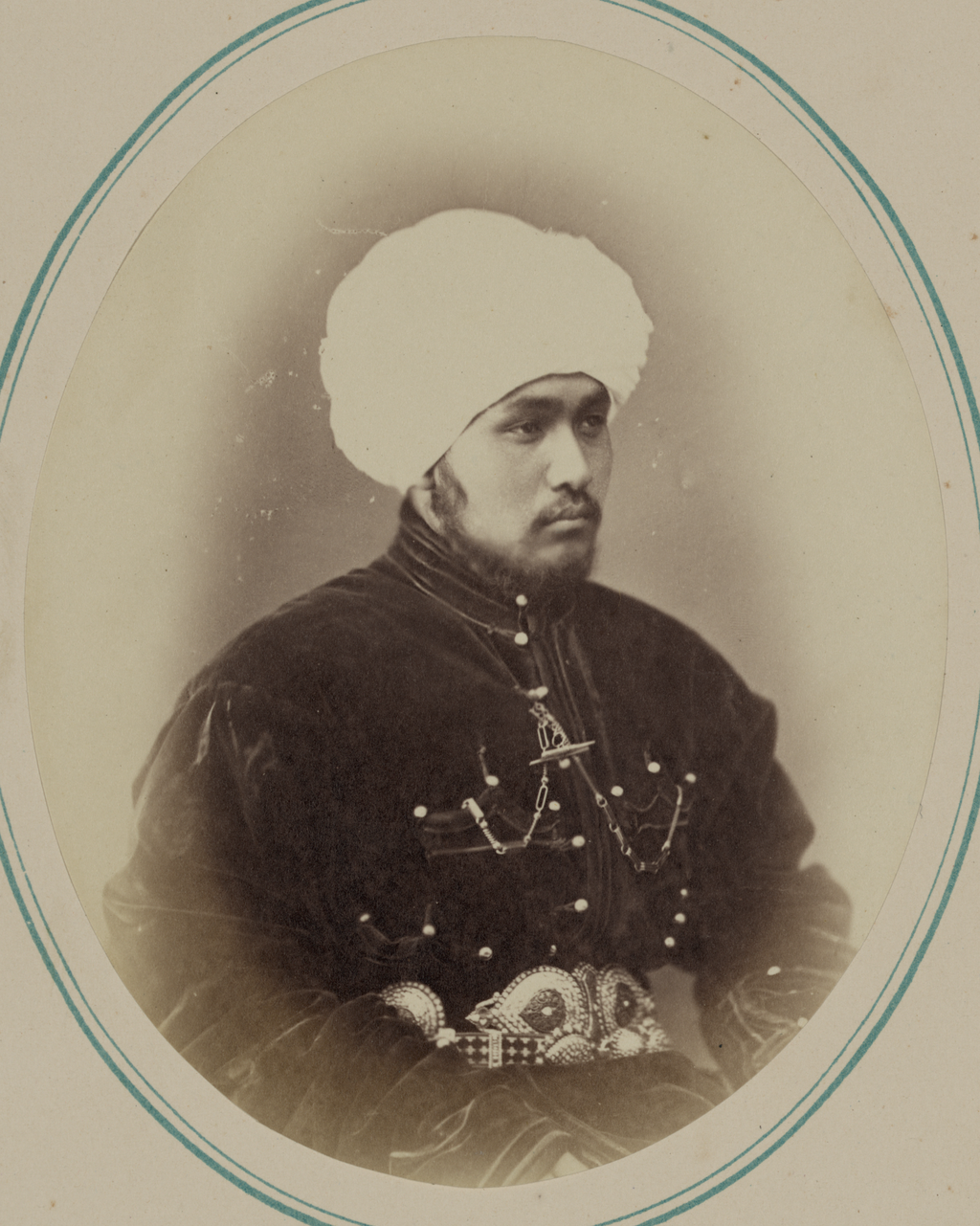
Portrait of Nasruddin Khan in the "Turkestan Album" created by order of General Konstantin Petrovich von Kaufmann (1818–1882).

After Khudoyar's flight, the uprising engulfed the entire khanate. Nasruddin was proclaimed ruler, but, he did not think about any reduction in taxes, and he resolutely blamed the Russians for all the troubles. He immediately declared the need to restore the khanate within its old borders from Ak-Mechet on one side and to Bishkek on the other. The Russian administration understood perfectly well that in the current situation, delay was "like death". Already on August 4, the district chief of Khujand, Nolde, mounted 50 soldiers of the 7th Turkestan Line Battalion on horses requisitioned from the population and sent this improvised cavalry to the border fortress of Makhram. Following this detachment, the entire battalion and division of the 2nd artillery battery moved under the overall command of Colonel Anton Osipovich Savrimovich. It was the approach of these forces to the border that forced the rebels to abandon the pursuit of the khan and the embassy.

The Russian administration of Khujand was, however, not delighted with the arrival of Khudoyar Khan either. His retinue rode around the city with weapons, and feeding the guests was expensive. On August 8, 1875, von Kaufmann, who was in Fort Verny, ordered by telegraph to send Khudoyar to Tashkent. The departure was scheduled for August 17. The new rulers of Kokand quickly received information about this. According to the rules of Eastern diplomacy, it was not supposed to leave the deposed ruler alive, and therefore on August 17 and 18, the Kokand army, numbering more than 10,000 people, descended from the mountains and captured several villages on the Angren river. One of the Kokand detachments reached the Tashkent-Khujand highway, where it began to burn post stations, capturing coachmen and travelers. General Petrov of the 2nd Line Battalion and another General, Vasiliev, who were traveling from Ura-Tyube to Khujand, were stabbed to death, and Petrov's six-year-old daughter was taken to Kokand. Two cadets of the 2nd Line Battalion, Klusovsky and Eichholm, who were traveling from Tashkent to Khujand, were captured. The Khan, who was at Piskent station during these pogroms, miraculously escaped death at the hands of his subjects.

=== Battles near Khujand ===
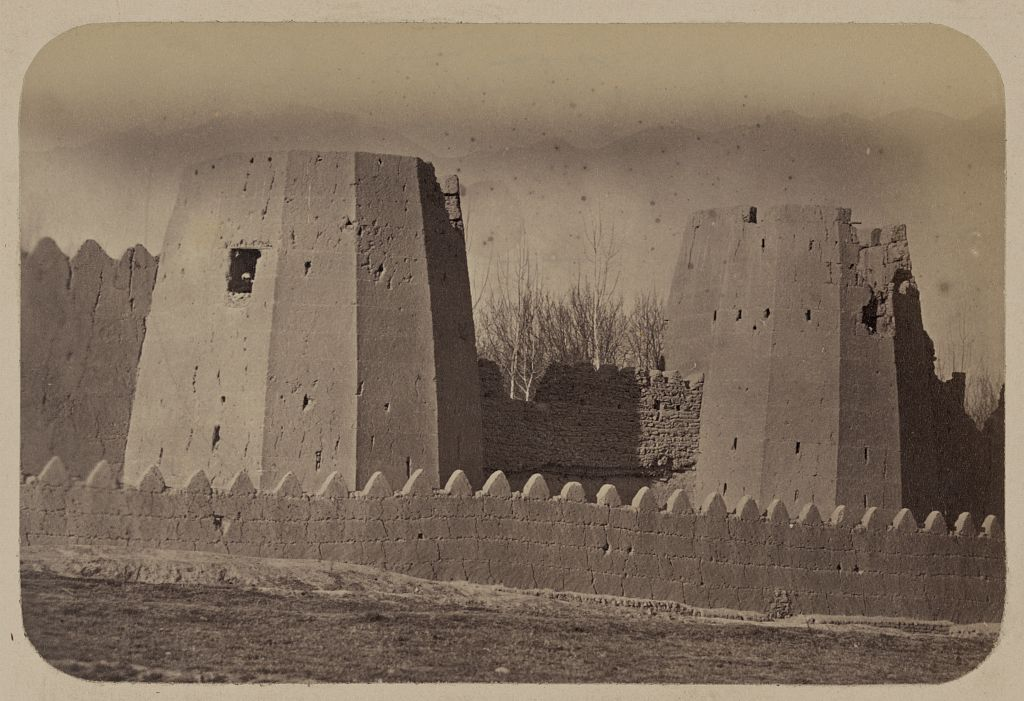
The gates of the city of Khujand.

On the evening of August 20, 1875, a large army appeared near Khujand itself. Mullah Issa-Auliye sent out proclamations to the local residents, but they remembered well the pogroms that the Kokand warriors had previously carried out during their campaigns against Tashkent, and were in no hurry to join the ghazzawat. At that time, a battalion and two companies of infantry, a district command, a hundred Cossacks and an artillery battery were in Khujand. On August 21, these forces, under the command of Colonel Savrimovich, were able to repel an attack by a 15,000-strong enemy army. On August 22, reinforcements arrived from Ura-Tyube, led by Major Skaryatin, which helped push the enemy back from the city gates.

On August 24, Colonel Savrimovich, at the head of 4 companies, hundreds of Cossacks and an artillery division, launched an offensive against the 16,000-strong Kokand army, which was under the command of Abdrakhman Avtabachi and stationed near the village of Kosta-Kola. The enemy was overthrown by accurate artillery fire, after which the infantry put them to flight. On the same day, the 1st rifle battalion with a division of horse guns under the command of Lieutenant Colonel Garnovsky arrived from Tashkent to Khujand, replacing the defenders of Khujand in the most difficult areas of the defense. Realizing the futility of further siege, the army of Kokand retreated from Khujand.

=== Battle of Mahram and agreement ===
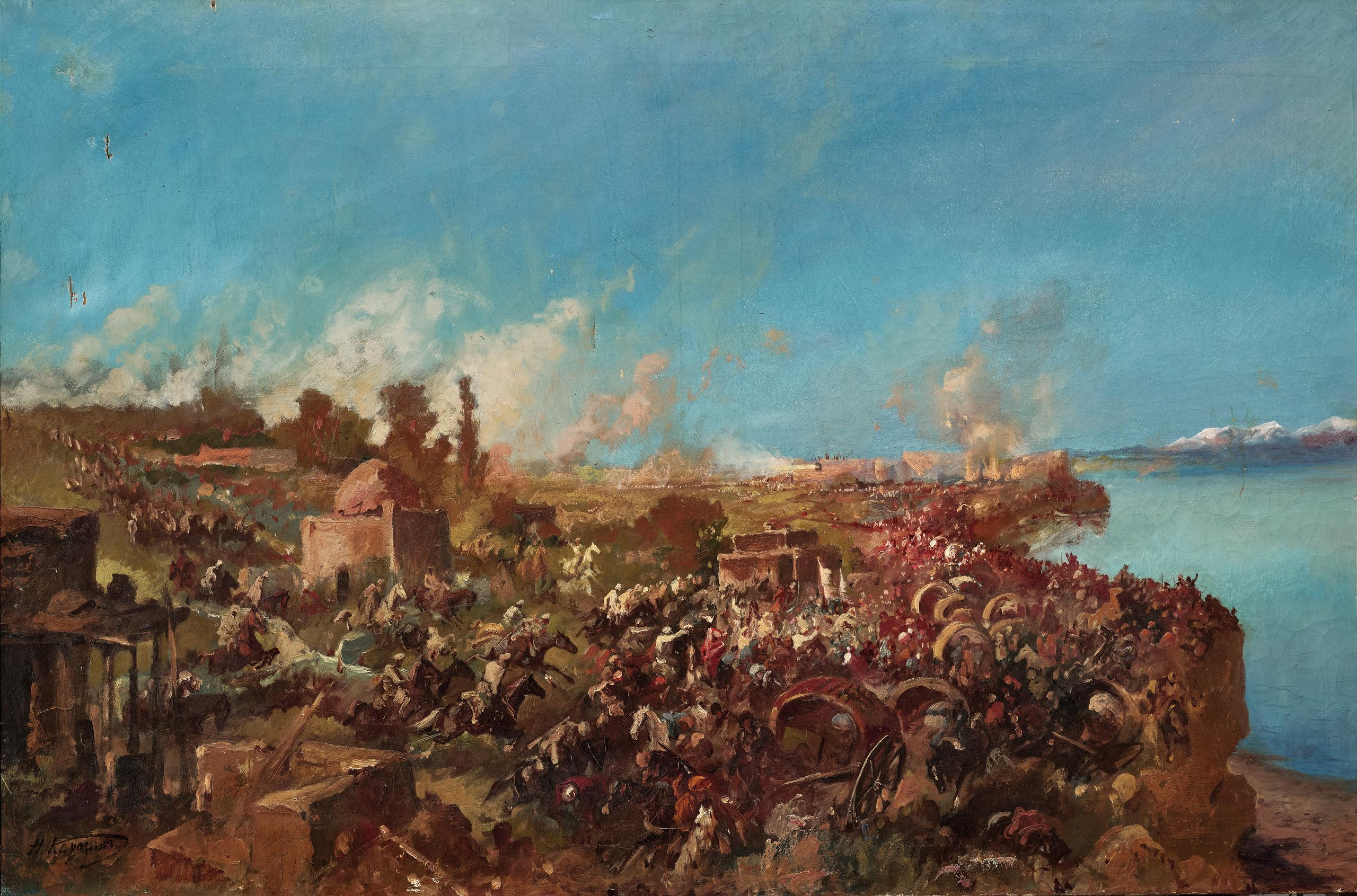
Battle of Mahram by Nikolay Karazin.

Governor-General Kaufmann, having received news of the invasion of Kokand troops on the night of 18 to 19 August, immediately began to concentrate troops in the area of military operations. A detachment of Major General Golovachev was sent to the city of Teliau. A column of Lieutenant Colonel Aminov set out from Tashkent. By 30 August, Russian troops were concentrated in Khujand, where Kaufmann himself arrived. Abdurakhman Avtobachi with a huge, 50,000-strong army was located not far from Khujand, at the Mahram fortress. On 1 September, Kaufmann moved against the enemy. In the battle of 3 September, 1875, the army og Kokand and their nomadic Kyrgyz allies were utterly routed. Over 2,000 soldiers of Kokand perished in the battle. Russian losses amounted to 6 people killed. Avtobachi fled to Margilan.

After this defeat, Abdurrakhman's supporters began to scatter. Soon, from his army of many thousands, only 400 warriors remained, with whom he rushed between Andijan and Uzkent. On October 5, Kaufman signed a peace treaty with Nasruddin Khan, drawn up in the style of the agreements with Bukhara and Khiva. It stipulated the khan's refusal to enter into direct diplomatic agreements with any power other than Russia. A number of lands on the right bank of the Syr Darya (the so-called "Namangan beykstvo") were included in the Turkestan Governorate-General under the name of the Namangan department. Mikhail Skobelev became the head of this department. The question of reinstating Khudoyar on the throne was not even raised. In addition, Nasreddin was obliged to pay the Russians a contribution of 3,000,000 rubles.

=== Abdurrakhman Avtobachi's rebellion ===
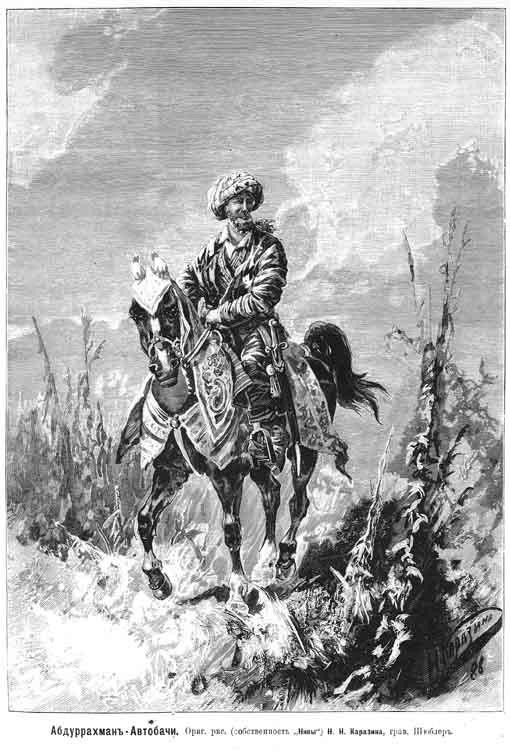
Abdurrakhman Avtobachi, by Nikolay Karazin.

On October 7, Russian troops crossed the Syr Darya and occupied Namangan. Here, Kaufmann received a message that rebels had once again raised their heads in the eastern part of the khanate. At Avtobachi's suggestion, the Kyrgyz Pulat-bek was proclaimed khan. The city of Andijan became the center of his troops. However, he was unable to resist the Russian troops. In early October, the Russian troops of Major General V.N. Trotsky routed the cavalry units of the Kyrgyz, but were unable to storm Andijan.

Meanwhile, a new turmoil began in Kokand. Incited by Abdurrakhman Avtobachi, the residents attacked the khan's palace. Nasruddin, like his father Khudoyar, fled under the protection of the Russians. On October 22, 1875, he arrived in Khujand. The army of Kokand captured Namangan and the Russian garrison, having taken refuge in the citadel, barely managed to repel the assault. In response, new Russian troops were transferred to the Namangan region. On October 27, Skobelev approached Namangan to relieve the Russian detachment defending the citadel. The Russian troops inflicted heavy losses on the Kokandis with powerful artillery fire, after which they took the part of the city occupied by the Kokandis, lifting the siege of the citadel. Kokand lost 3,800 people, killed in action. The Namangan active detachment, led by Skobelev, continued raids into various areas of the khanate to suppress the rebellion.

== Aftermath ==
=== Continued unrest ===
Punitive expeditions continued under Skobelev even after the capture of Kokand. In May 1876 he led an expedition to the Qizilsu valley to hunt down former Kokandi officials who had fled Russian capture, and force the Kyrgyz tribes of the region to formally surrender. In July, a minor battle occurred in Sary-Qurghan between Skobelev and the Kokandi leaders, with indecisive results. Soon after, Skobelev left for Marghelan to assume the role of Military Governor.

=== Political impact ===
The conquest of Kokand drew little international attention at the time. Britain, a regional rival, was unconcerned as they already considered the Khanate of Kokand to be a Russian puppet. Of the three major independent states in Central Asia, Kokand was the only one that was fully annexed..

Skobelev was made a both a general, and the Military Governor of the newly established Fergana Oblast. Nasruddin Khan and Abd al-Rahman Aftabachi continued to live in Russia as pensioners. After the annexation of the Khanate, Khudayar Khan fled Orenburg with his wealth, though he was robbed of everything but his watch after crossing into the Emirate of Afghanistan. In Afghanistan he met the Ottoman merchant 'Abd al-Rahim Effendi, who sponsored a poet to write of Khudayar's life, and successfully petitioned the Russian government to allow Khudayar to the Russian Empire and restore his wealth and titles. He died during his return in the town of Karukh, before reaching Russia.

=== Economic development ===
While economic considerations were not a significant factor in the decision to annex Fergana, the Fergana Oblast was very beneficial to the Russian economy. It was the wealthiest and most agriculturally productive province in Russian Turkestan, being the center of the Russian Empires cotton production. In the late 1870s, major efforts were undertaken to organize a comprehensive land tax system in the region.

== Sources ==
- Babadjanov, Bakhtiyar Miraimovich (2010). Kokandskoe Khanstvo. Vlast’, Politika, Religiia Кокандское Ханство: Власть, Политика, Религия [Kokand Khanate: Power, Politics, Religion] (in Russian). Tokyo and Tashkent: Yangi Nashr. ISBN 978-9943-330-50-4.
- Divaev, A. (1916). "Последние дни Худояр-хана" [The Last Days of Khudoyar Khan]. Turkestanskie Vedomosti (in Russian): 120–134.
- Kuleshov, V. (1887). "Русское посольство в Кашгар в 1875 году" [Russian embassy in Kashgar in 1875]. Istorichesky Vestnik (in Russian). 30: 694–708.
- Levi, Scott Cameron (2017). The Rise and Fall of Khoqand, 1709-1876: Central Asia in the Global Age. Pittsburgh: University of Pittsburgh Press. ISBN 978-0-8229-6506-0.
- Morrison, Alexander (2021). The Russian Conquest of Central Asia: A Study in Imperial Expansion, 1814-1914. Cambridge: Cambridge University Press. ISBN 978-1-107-03030-5.
- Pierce, Richard (1960). Russian Central Asia 1867-1917: A Study in Colonial Rule. University of California Press. ISBN 978-0-52031-774-1.
- Tolbukhov, E. (1916). "Скобелев в Туркестане" [Skobelev in Turkestan]. Istorichesky Vestnik (in Russian). 147: 107–132, 369–403, 638–667.
- Trionov, K. K. (1910). "B гостях у хана Наср-Эддина" [Visiting Khan Nasr-Eddin]. Istorichesky Vestnik (in Russian): 130–139.
