= Campaigns of Shymkent =

1864 battle in Kazakhstan

Battle of Shymkent
- Part of Russian conquest of Central Asia
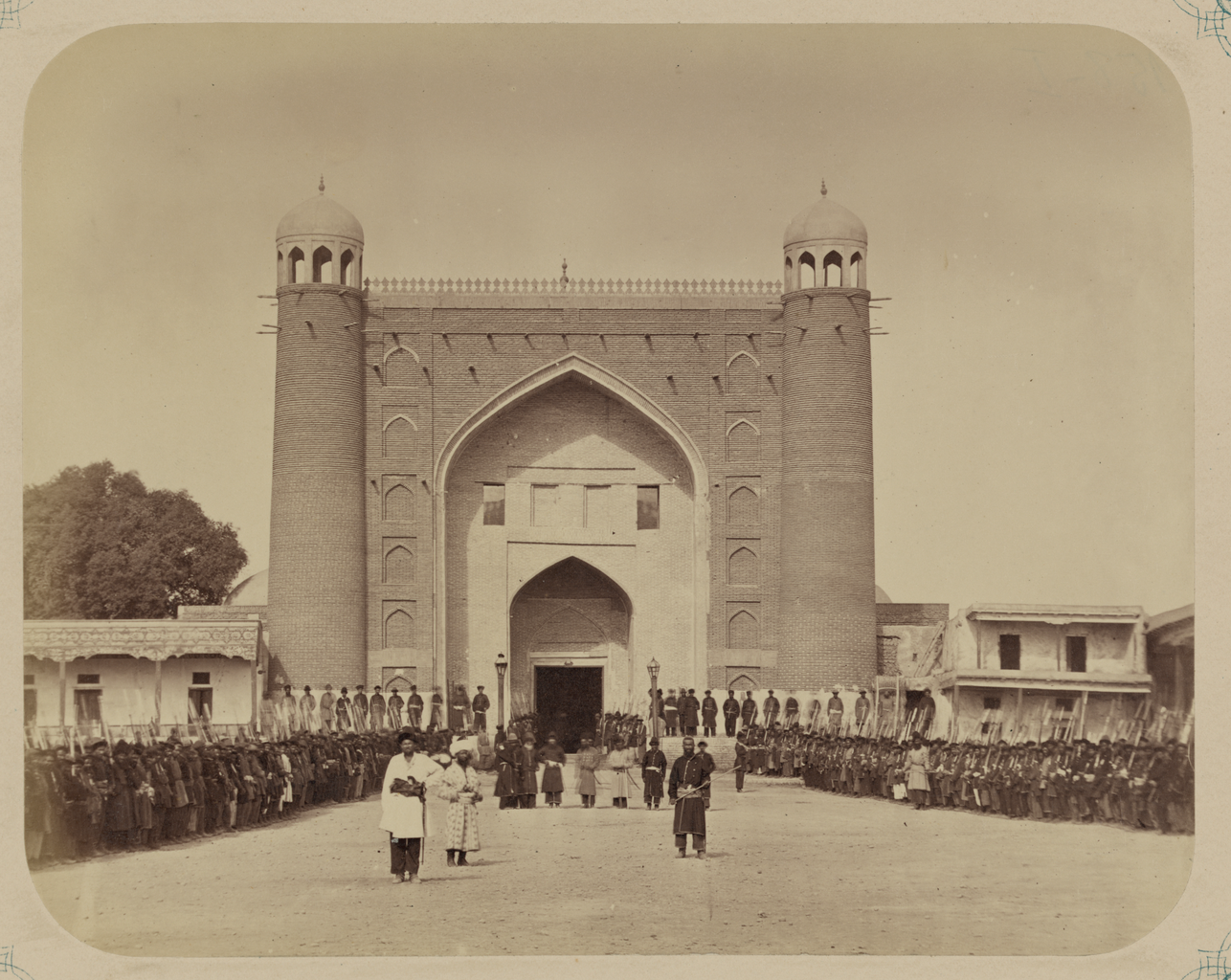
Date	First campaign: 22 July; Second campaign: 14–22 September, 1864
Location	Shymkent
Result	First Battle: Russian Retreat; Second Battle: Russian victory

Belligerents
Russian Empire; Supported by: (Qing dynasty) Qing Dynasty	Khanate of Kokand; Kyrgyzs

Commanders and leaders
(Russian Empire) Mikhail Chernyayev	Alimqul; Mingbai †

Strength
1,298	Initial: 25,000; Eventual: 10,000

Casualties and losses
6 killed, 41 wounded	First campaign: 3,000 killed Second campaign: 10,000 killed or captured

The Battle of Chymkent took place in 1864 between the Kyrgyz, Khanate of Kokand against the Russian Empire. General Chernyaev besieged Shymkent for ten days, during which there were daily battles; he eventually withdrew without taking the city. Mullah Alimkul then strengthened the city's defenses by gathering a garrison of Uzbeks and Kyrgyz. After finishing this task, he put Mirza-Ahmet in charge of Tashkent and went to Kokand with the Kokand army.In this battle, Qing Dynasty, which was also at war with Kyrgyz, supported Russians.

During the second campaign, Chernyaev acted much more successfully, and was able to take the city, continuing the Russian expansion further to Tashkent.

== First Battle ==
The expedition was heading to explore the citadel of the city and prepare its siege, when Chernyaev approached the city, he realized that he was surrounded by 25,000 Kokand army. He quickly prepared for the battle and set up an artillery and he stood in a square, the Kokandans conducted two attacks, the first was the largest and most dangerous, confusing the Russians with an incredible hum and shout they could break through their formation, however, the artillery sounded louder and the Cossacks repelled the onslaught with incredibly heavy losses for the Kokandans. Three hours later, the Kokand people repeated the attack, but not so decisively and were forced to retreat, the khanate's losses up to 3,000 killed. Despite the success in the battle, Chernyaev was forced to retreat due to lack of equipment and a strong garrison at the enemy.

== Second campaign ==
At the end of August, part of the Kokand forces withdrew from Shymkent, 10,000 remained there. Chernyaev did not waste time and, taking more artillery, moved towards the city. The city was considered impregnable, so the garrison also made regular sorties, knocking down the siege work. On September 22, the city was stormed, which ended a few hours later, almost the entire garrison fell, while Russian losses amounted to 47 people wounded and killed.

== Aftermath ==
The capture of Shymkent effectively deprived the Kokand people of the opportunity to win the war, despite limited success in defending Tashkent, their offensive actions ended after the defeat at Ican.
