= Bobur Park =

Park in Namangan, Uzbekistan

- Bobur bogʻi
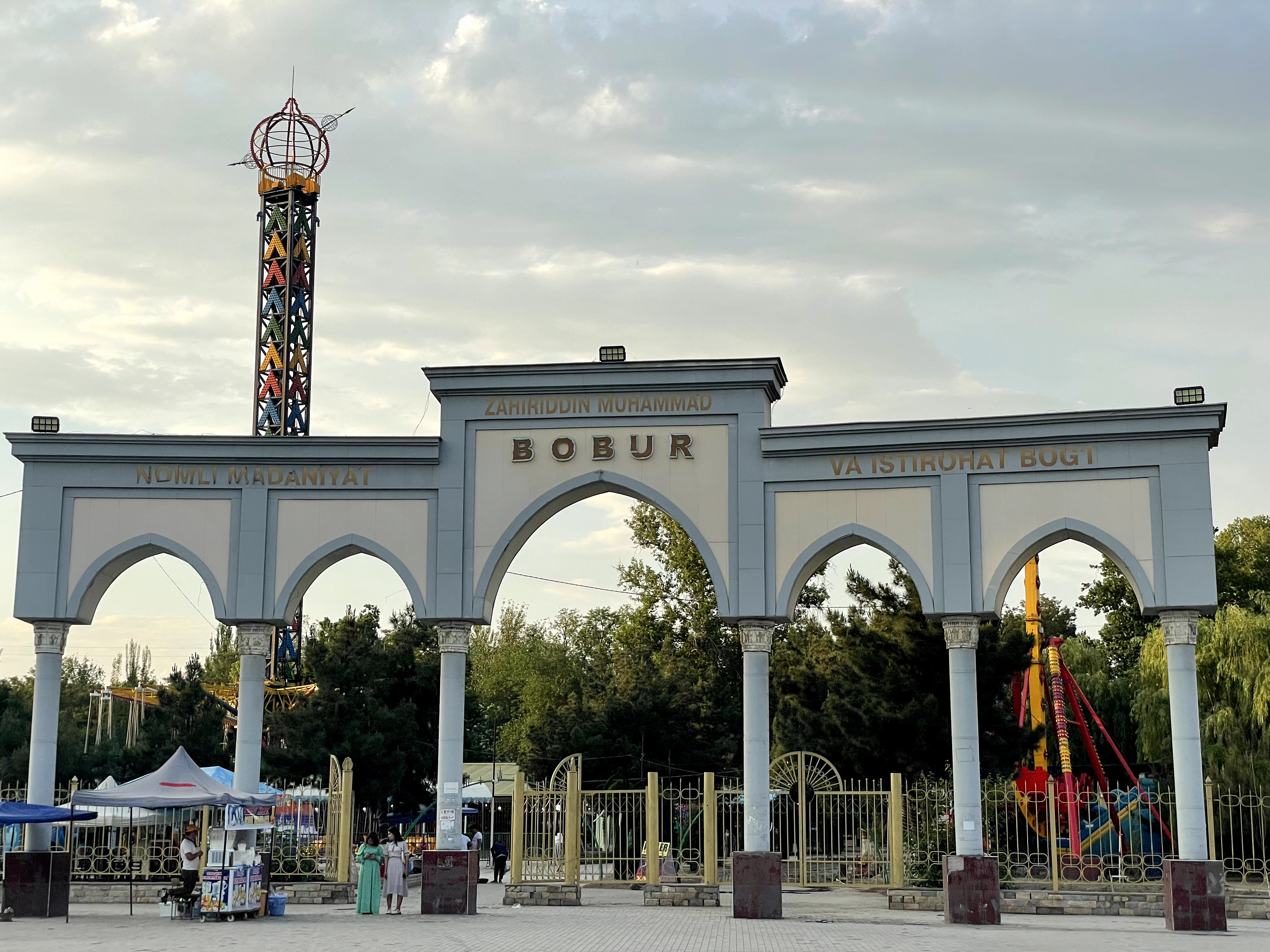
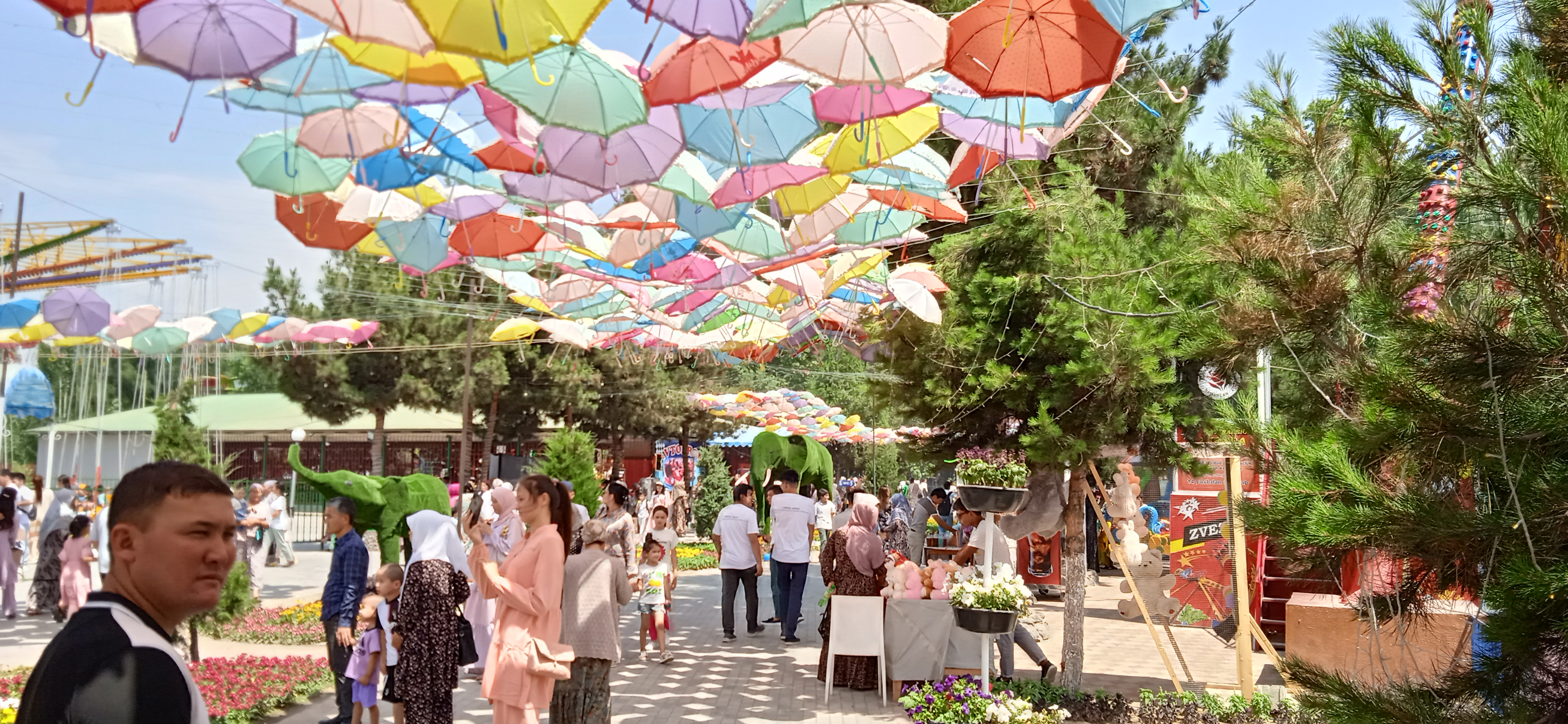
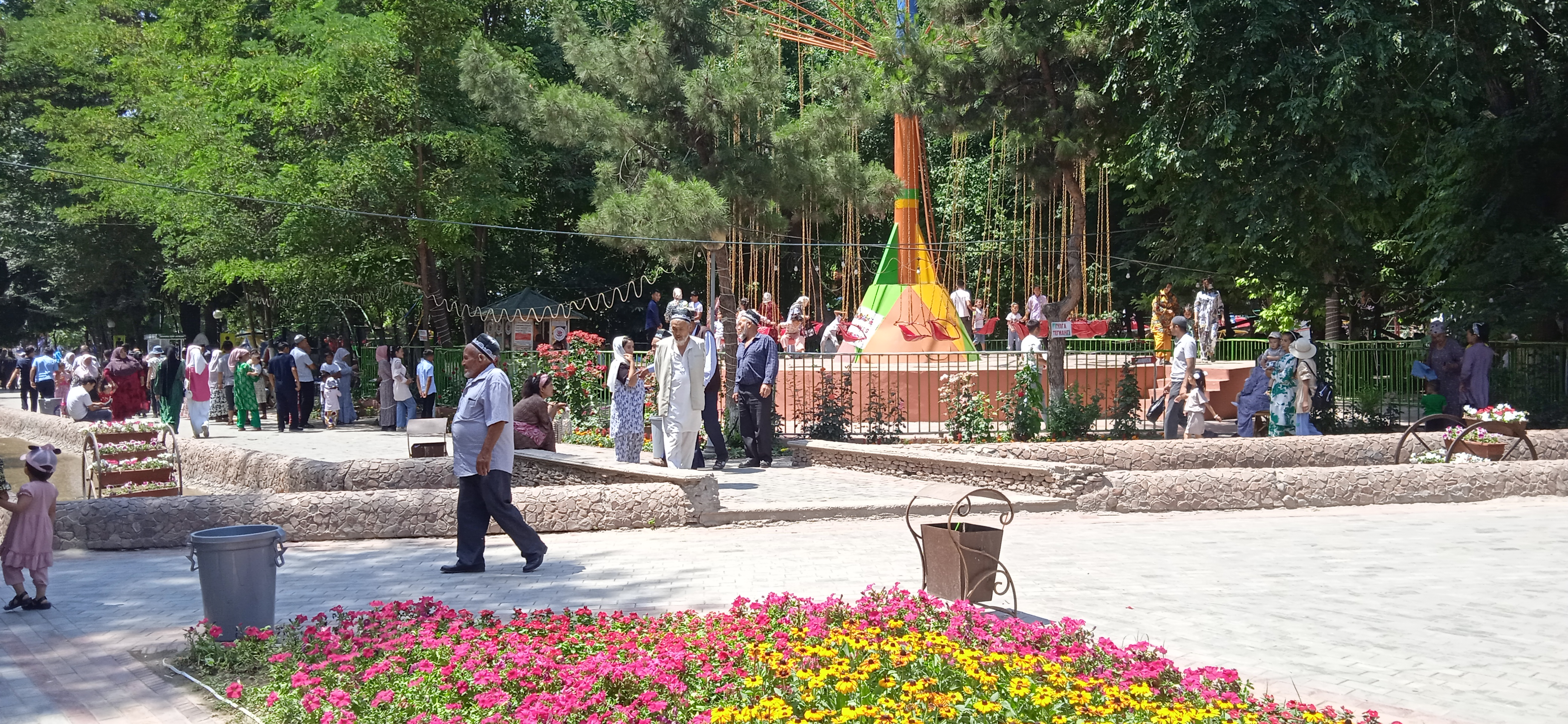
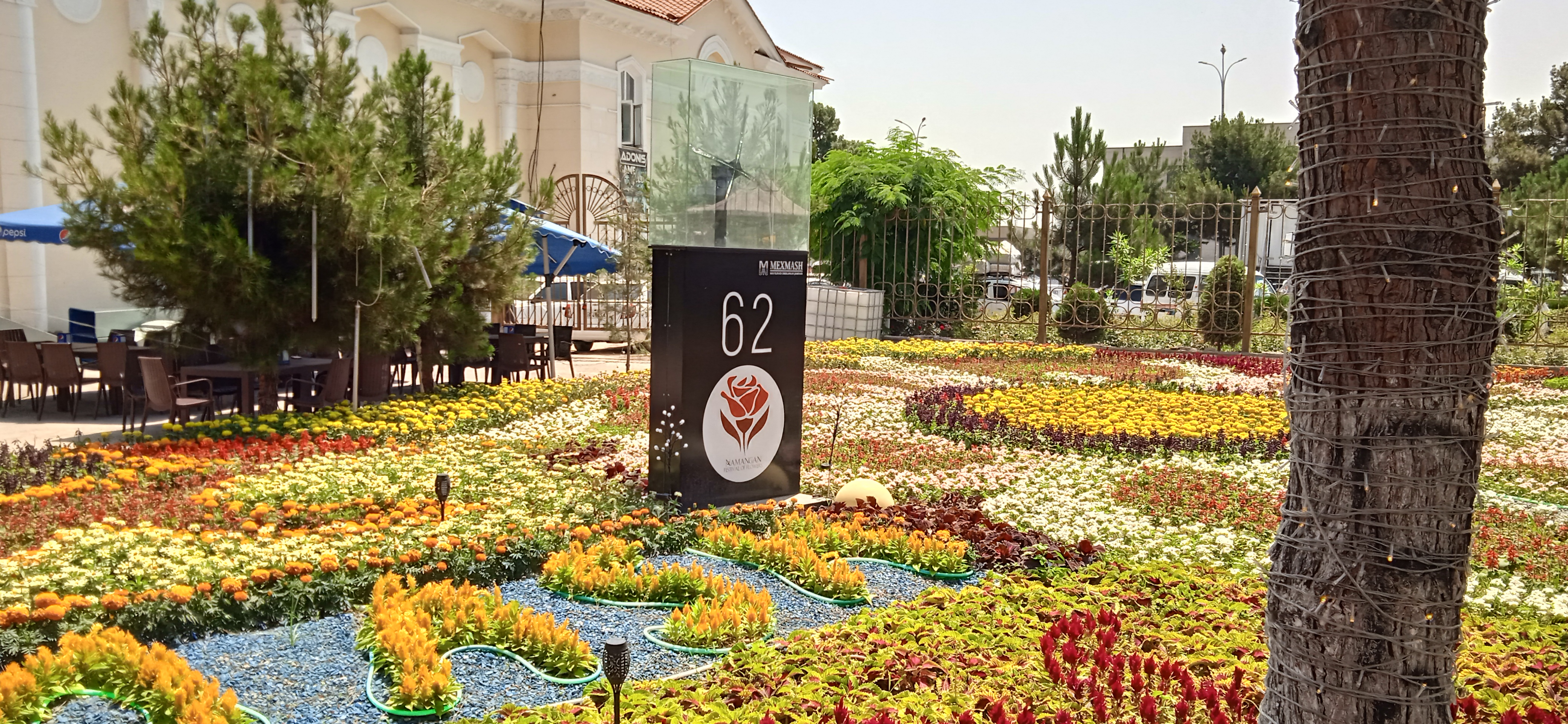
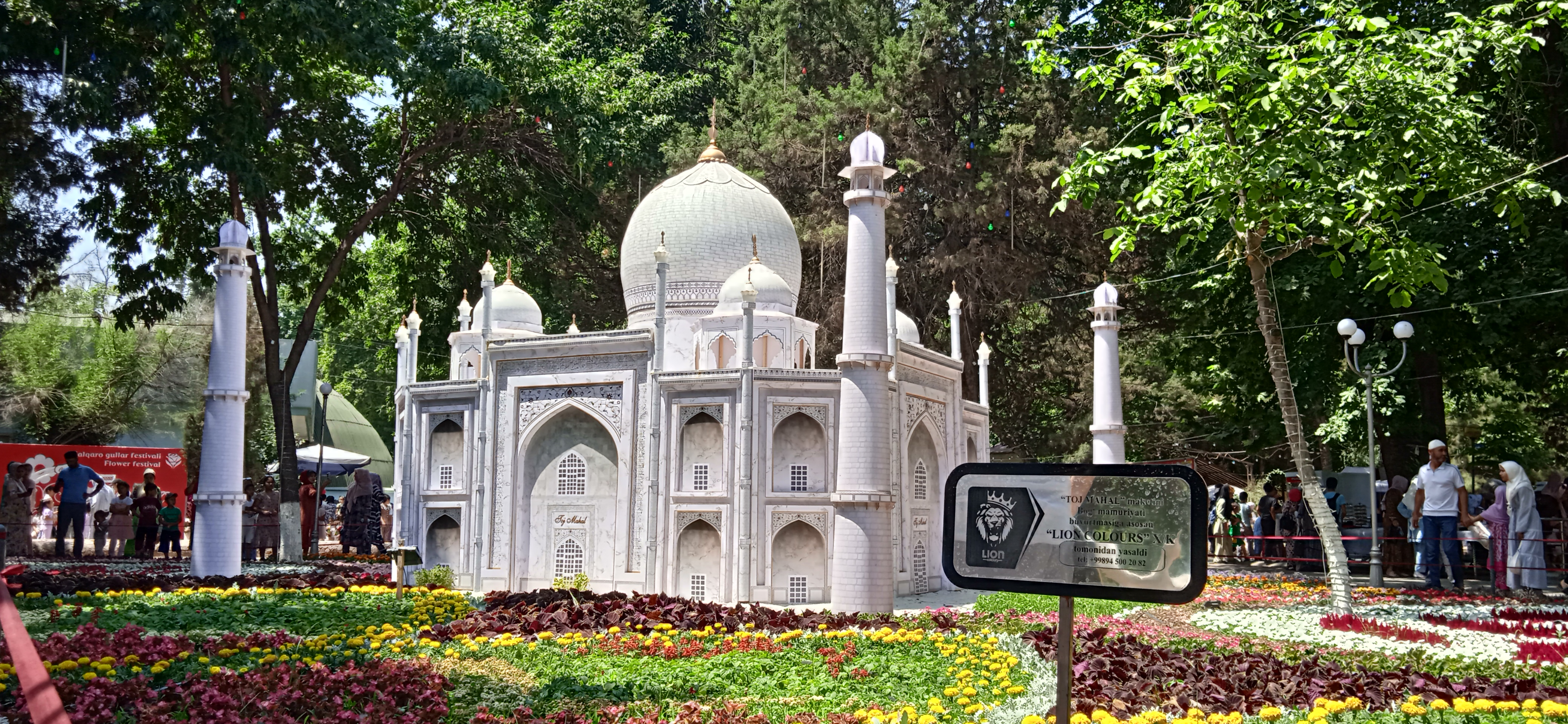
- General view of the park
- Interactive map of Bobur Park
- Location: Namangan, Uzbekistan
- Coordinates: 40°59′53″N 71°40′15″E
- Established: 1884
- Open: 6:00 a.m. to 11:00 p.m.
- Status: Open

Bobur Park ( full name: Zahiriddin Muhammad Bobur Culture and Recreation Park) is a park located in Namangan, Uzbekistan. The site previously hosted the Pulzor neighborhood, whose residents were primarily engaged in floriculture, producing rosewater and various herbal infusions from flowers and plant roots. Due to its reputation, the Khudoyar Khan selected this area for the construction of a madrasa.
