= Siege of Tashkent =

Siege during the Russian conquest of Central Asia

- Part of the Russo-Kokand War
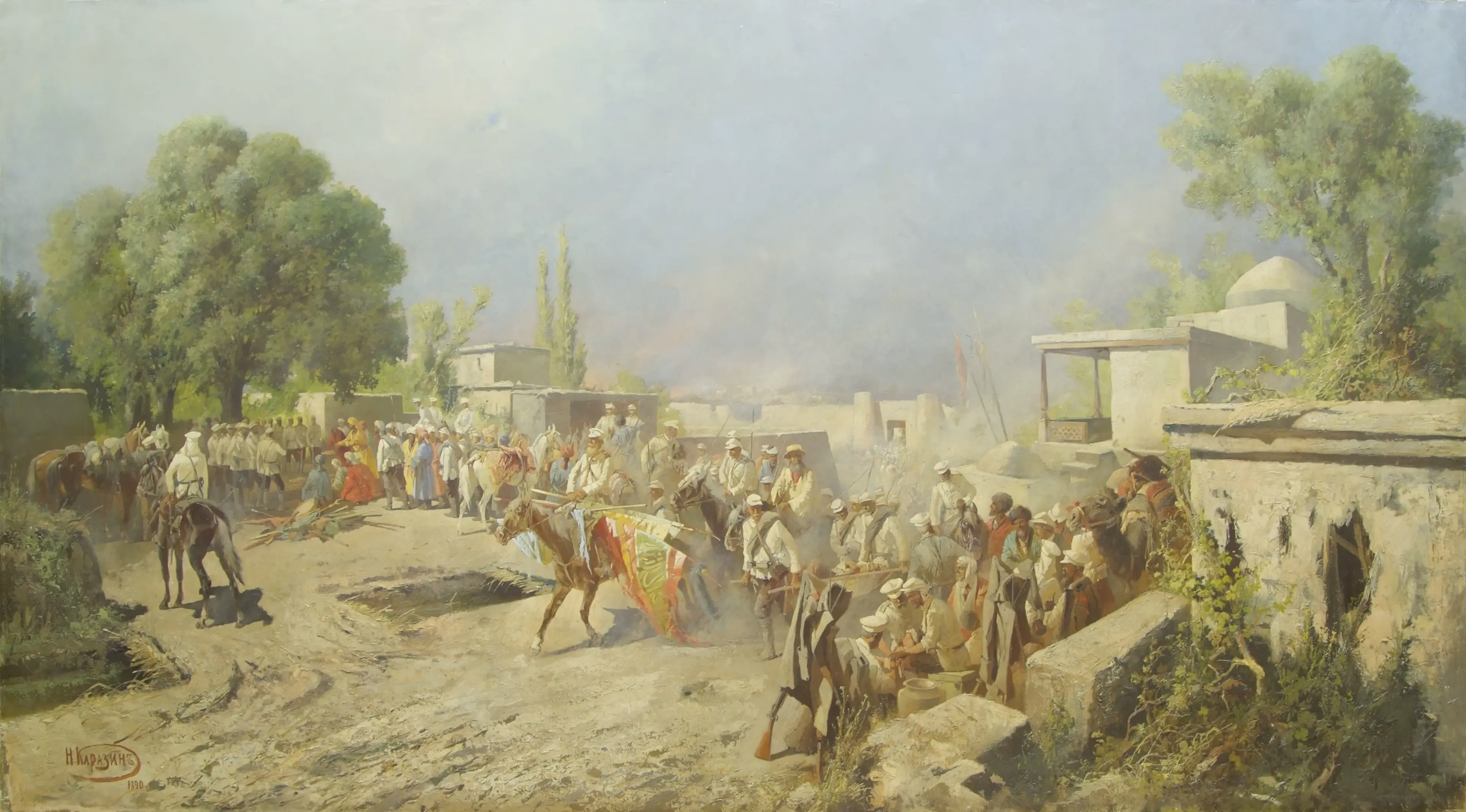
- The Capture of Tashkent by General Chernyayev, painting by Nikolay Karazin (1890)
Date	9 May – 17 June 1865 (1 month and 8 days)
Location	Tashkent, Khanate of Kokand 41°18′40″N 69°16′47″E
Result	Russian victory

Belligerents
Russian Empire	Khanate of Kokand

Commanders and leaders
(Russian Empire) Mikhail Chernyayev	(Khanate of Kokand) Alimqul †

Strength
1,951	approx. 30,000

Casualties and losses
41 dead; 179 wounded	Extremely heavy

The siege of Tashkent (9 May – 17 June 1865) was the last major battle between the Khanate of Kokand and the Russian Empire during the Russo-Kokand War. During the battle, Alimqul, the de-facto leader of Kokand was killed. In the aftermath of the battle, the khanate was greatly weakened. The Russian Empire would annex the city, strengthening its position in Central Asia and facilitating its later conquest of Bukhara.

== Background ==
Conflict within Kokand allowed Russia to conquer Kokand's subjects in the Kazakh Steppe in 1864. This division was present in the Kokandi city of Tashkent, as the clergy were willing to ally with the Emirate of Bukhara, and merchants were willing to accept Russian rule due to heavy taxation from Kokand.

During the 1800s, Tashkent was the most prosperous city in Central Asia. Over the past decades, much of Russian foreign policy in the region had been centered on eventually capturing the city. While the city was highly valued by the Russian Empire, Tsar Alexander II held off on ordering an attack of the city, fearing possible reprisal from the British and doubting the capability of regional commander Mikhail Chernyayev's small army.

As for Tashkent, I beg your Excellency vigilantly and closely to observe everything that occurs in this town, and to assist the moral party that wishes to separate from hostile Khoqand and through your actions to direct the formation from Tashkent of a polity, independent from Khoqand and Bukhara, but a vassal of Russia.

— Letter from Nikolai Kryzhanovsky to Mikhail Chernyayev

However, on February 2, 1865, Governor-general of Orenburg Governorate Nikolai Kryzhanovsky sent a letter to Chernyayev, containing a summary of document by Foreign Minister Alexander Gorchakov and a set of instructions. While Gorchakov's section was clear that Tashkent was not to be annexed by Russia, and an independent city-state was desired, Nikolai Kryzhanovsky's notes were vague, and granted Chernyayev reasonable powers to attack the city. Kryzhanovsky additionally stated that he would be visiting the region in summer, which possibly motivated Chernyayev to attack faster, not wanting to share credit for the battle.

== Prelude ==
In May 1865, Chernyayev began the march to Tashkent after receiving news that Bukharan forces were 15 miles away from Tashkent, and preparing to launch an assault. On April 29, Chernyayev's forces reached Fort Niazbek, a garrison of 7,000 Kokand soldiers just south of Tashkent. Chernyayev would launch an attack on the city, successfully capturing it at a loss of only seven men wounded. Niazbek lay upstream of Tashkent on the Chirchik River, which served as Tashkent's primary water source. Chernyayev ordered his engineer company to divert the river, cutting off water supply to Tashkent. While in Niazbek, reinforcements called by Chernyayev arrived, bolstering his numbers to 1,900.

Upon hearing of Niazbek's capture several days later, Alimqul sent riders to inform provincial leaders, and immediately rode to Tashkent accompanied by 6,000 soldiers and 12 guns from the Ferghana valley.

== Siege ==
=== Clash with Alimqul ===
On May 8, Chernyayev reached Tashkent and began to study the defenses and contact allies within the city. Chernyayev came to the conclusion that his comparatively small numbers would render a siege impossible, and that the city could only be captured through a sudden assault. An assault was supported by the length of the wall, which caused defenses to be spread extremely thin.

On May 9, Alimqul arrived near Shur-Tepa, a location outside of Tashkent's walls where Chenyaev's troops were stationed, and at 6:00 a.m. began shelling the Russian camp. Russian forces soon prepared a counterattack, with the 4th companies splitting to initiate a frontal assault hitting the center and a flanking maneuver. Alimqul's troops offered very weak resistance. At some point during the battle Alimquil was shot and killed, leading to a mass retreat of his forces. The personal guard retreated first, followed by the infantry. Much of the infantry was overrun by Russian forces, and the artillery were abandoned. In total, approximately 300 Kokandi soldiers were killed, and 10 Russian soldiers were wounded. Those remaining in Alimqul's army would not stay for the final defense of Tashkent.

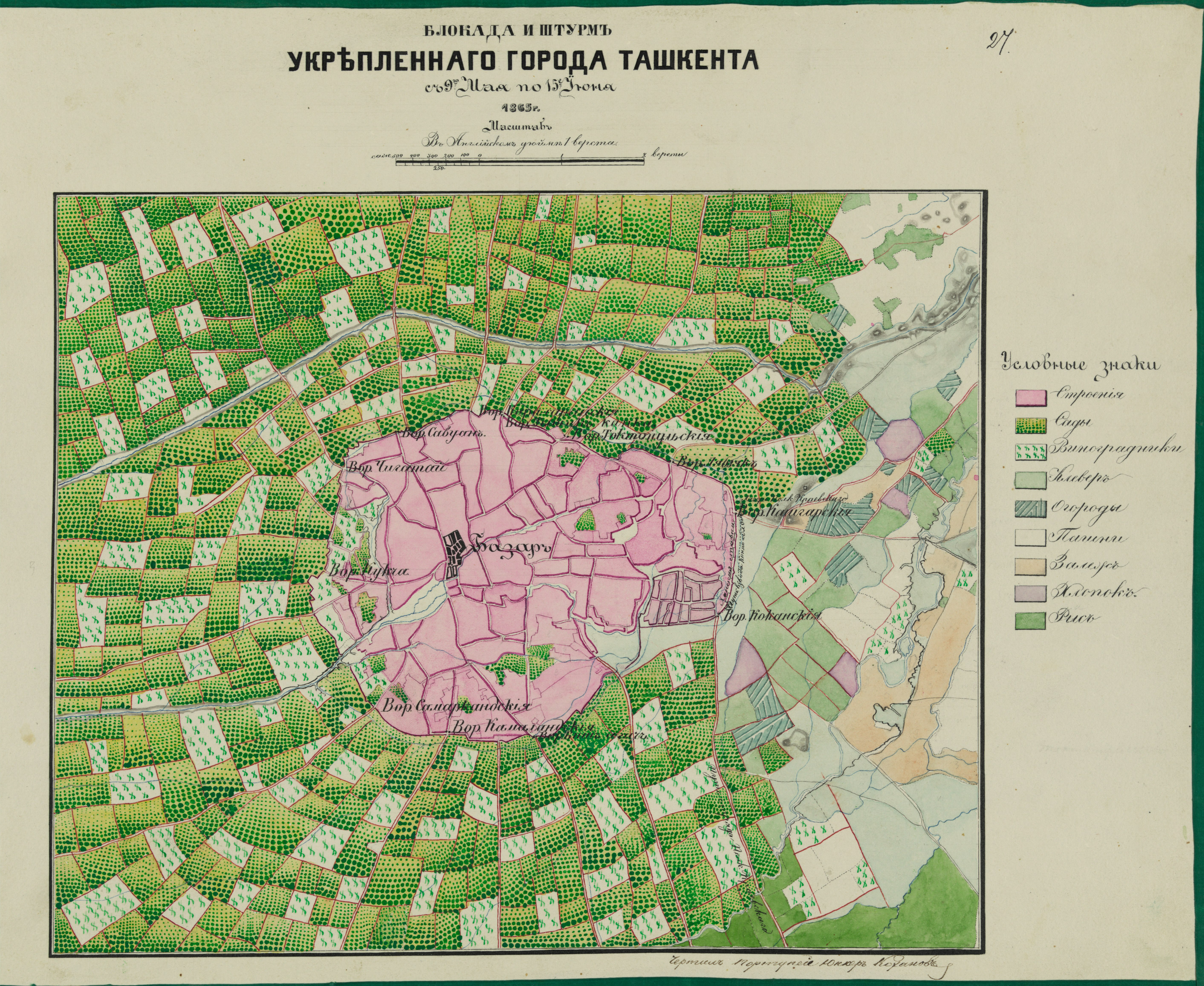
Map of the Russian blockade

While Chernyayev hoped that the power vacuum would empower the pro-Russian faction within the city, residents focused on other options. One group attempted to form an independent state led by Sultan Sayyid Khan, and elders asked Muzaffar bin Nasrullah for support, which he expressed interest in.

Chernyayev's expedition lacked the numbers to fully siege the city. Instead, he dispatched patrols to harass citizens attempting to gather food from gardens outside the walls or graze their animals, enforcing a general blockade. The city was additionally bombarded by a light battery under the leadership of Colonel Kraevsky. Most residents of Tashkent were aware of a possible assault, but much less were ready to actively resist a Russian invasion. Tashkentis were likely growing increasingly frustrated due to the Russian blockade and raiding.

Chernyayev's exact reasoning for ordering an assault of Tashkent is unknown. While he would state after the battle that he wanted to prevent the Emirate of Bukhara from capturing the city, other factors were likely in play. His failed siege of the city one year before would have severely damaged his career if left unrectified, and this second expedition would likely be lauded by the government if successful. Additionally, one uncorroborated account states Chernyayev feared any possible retreat would be attacked and overrun by "Asian hoards".

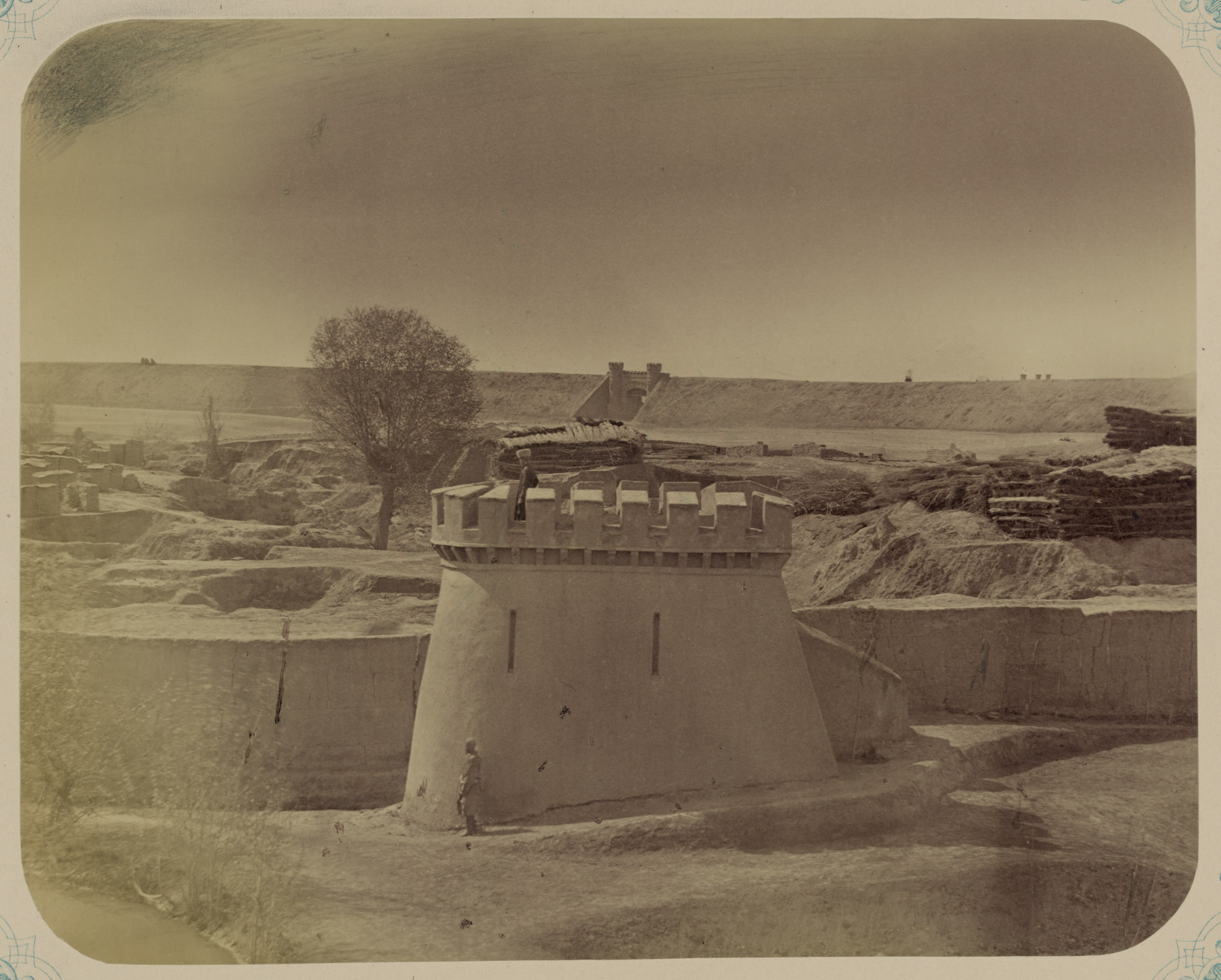
Outer tower of Tashkent's walls

=== Assault ===
Before the main assault, Chernyayev visited the troops and talked with them to build morale. On June 15 at 2:00 a.m, the Russians began to approach Taskent, encouraged by the priest Andrei Malov who stood at the column's head. Russian troops waited in the outer gardens until about 4:00 a.m, when Tashkenti guards could no longer be heard. At this point, Russian troops charged the walls with scaling ladders, easily climbing and capturing the walls from several different sides. However, upon reaching the top they began to receive fire from hidden musketeers in the city gardens and fortified areas. Russian troops began to experience losses while fighting for the towers, which contained Tashkenti artillery. Captain Rotmistr Wulfred led a successful assault of the Kamelan Gate, though he was wounded in the attack. At about 5:30 a.m, the Kamelan Gate was opened and Russian artillery entered the city, dislodging Kokandi defenders after a few salvos. As the other commanders had been wounded, these soldiers were placed under the command of Lieutenant Soltanovsky and formed the storming column.

Another Russian detachment under Abramov fought across a bridgehead to capture and open a key gate. The advance was successful despite heavy artillery fire, and the detachment eventually reached the gate. In the gate, Russian soldiers discovered their lost licorne, which Kokandi forces had captured in the battle of Ican.

One Russian column under Colonel Kraevsky simultaneously worked to destroy the Tashkenti artillery near the Salar Gate, using explosive shells to destroy cover and canister shot to kill Tashkenti defenders. Despite tough resistance and soft soil which caused Kraevsky's artillery to bury themselves in the dirt, after an hour of fighting the Tashkenti artillery was destroyed. Kraevsky's detachment was then dispatched to destroy escaping Tashkenti cavalry. After scattering two retreating groups several miles north with canister shot, Kraevsky returned to Tashkent and entered the city through Kashgar Gate.

After the gates had been opened, Soltanovsky's column and Kraevsky's column began a forward offensive towards the city center from opposite sides of the city.

Russian soldiers met strong resistance from Tashkenis, who possibly included Kokandi loyalists, supporters of an independent city-state, and followers of Syzdyk Sultan. Tashkentis gathered in road barricades, in trees, on top of roofs, and within buildings to fire at Russian forces. Both columns would successfully advance several miles into the city. Soltanovsky's force used artillery to destroy entrenched positions and riflemen to pick off soldiers hiding in trees. Kraevsky's column was unable to return to the main force at the outer Kamelan Gate by evening, but was able to capture and defend the citadel. Kraevsky's column would continue to defend the structure throughout the night.

During this march through the city, 5,000 Kokand guards attempted to evacuate the city, but wer intercepted by Russian forces, who captured the guards banners.

Soltanovsky's column and Kraevsky's column would continue to patrol the city the following day, focusing on roads to and from the Kamelan Gate. Many of the Tashkenti artillery positions which had been destroyed the previous day had been rebuilt, though Russian artillery was able to scatter them with only a few volleys. By June 17, the city was fully under Russian control.

== Aftermath ==
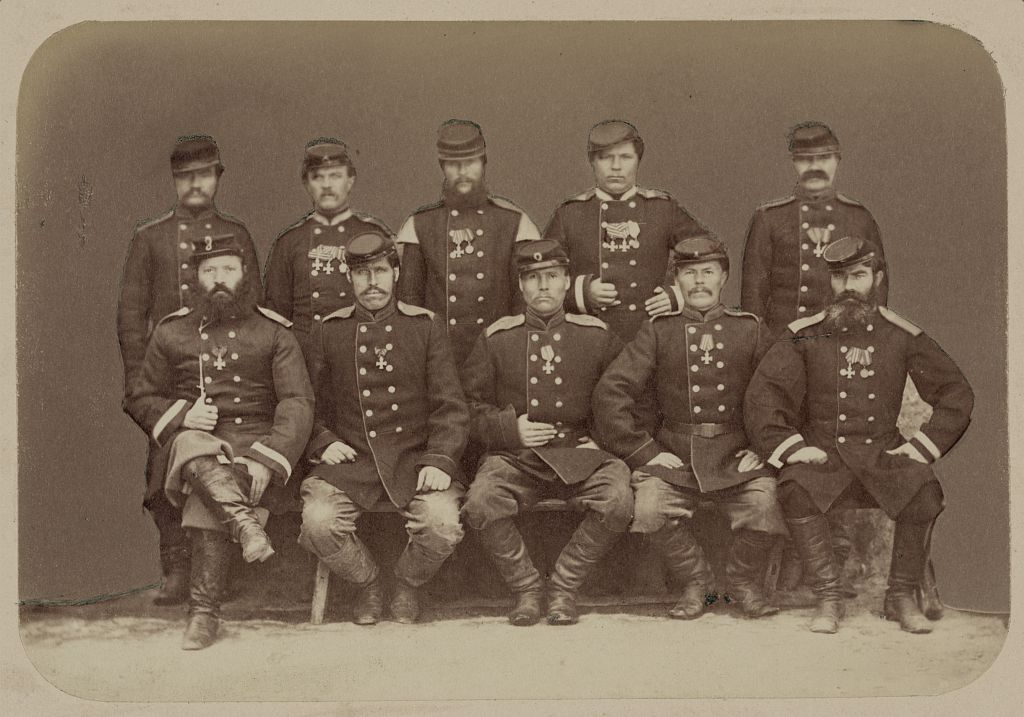
St. George's Cavaliers, awarded during the storming of Tashkent

After the siege, Chernyayev feared a possible attack from the Emirate of Bukhara, who he believed was preparing to attack with over 80,000. To prepare for this possible attack, Chernyayev attempted a conciliatory policy with Tashkentis. He visited local mosques and bazaars, formed close ties with the cities ulama, and promised to strongly enforce sharia law. By creating an alliance with the ulama, Chernyayev was able to maintain control of the city while lacking the troops to hold it with force. In the Russian government, a year long debate would occur over what the status of Tashkent should become. In August 1866, the city was officially annexed into the Russian Empire.

The capture of the city became a mythologized event in Russian history, and would be marked by increasingly elaborate anniversary celebrations. On the 50th anniversary in 1915, a swath of public buildings and the city of Shymkent, which Chernyayev had captured a year before Tashkent, were renamed in honor of Chernyayev.
