= Azad Beg =

Afghan politician

Azad Beg آزاد بیگ
- Born: July 4, 1952 (age 74); Campbellpur, Dominion of Pakistan
- Occupation: Mujahideen leader
- Known for: founder of Islamic Union of the Northern Provinces
- Relatives: Nasruddin Khan (great-grandfather)

Azad Beg (born July 4, 1952) was the founder of the Turkic nationalist Islamic Union of the Northern Provinces movement in Afghanistan during the Soviet-Afghan War. Beg was the great-grandson of Nasseruddin, the last amir of Kokand.

== Early life ==
Azad Beg was born in Campbellpur, Dominion of Pakistan. His father, Abdul Waris Karimi, was an Uzbek doctor serving in the Pakistan Army. Azad Beg's mother was the daughter of Mehmood Beg, the grandson of Muhammad Khudayar Khan, the Khan of Kokand.
