= Nasseruddin =

Nasseruddin and similar names may refer to:

- Nasruddin Khan, the last ruler of Kokand
- Naser al-Din Shah Qajar, known as Nasseruddin Shah, a ruler of Persia
- Naseeruddin Shah, an Indian filmmaker
