= Muhammad Malla Beg Khan =

Muhammad Mallya Beg Khan
- Khan of Kokand
- Reign: 1858 — 1862
- Predecessor: Muhammad Khudayar Khan
- Successor: Shah Murad Khan
- Born: c. 1812; Kokand
- Died: 1862; Kokand
- Father: Shir Ali Khan

Muhammad Mallya Beg Khan, also known as Malla-Khan, was the Khan of Kokand from 1858 to 1862; he was the son of Shir Ali Khan and the stepbrother of Khudayar Khan. He was assassinated in 1862 and succeeded by his seventeen-year-old stepbrother Shah Murad Khan, who ruled for only several days until Muhammad Khudayar Khan came back to power.

During his rule the land of the present-day city of Bishkek was annexed to the Khanate and expanded construction projects on the Chu River. His regent Alimqul controlled many affairs of the Khanate and was to some extent its de facto ruler.

In 1859 the Russians occupied Fort Julek, which according to Russian governor-general of Orenburg, was to protect Fort Perovski. The British under Earl Canning established contact and friendly relations with Muhammad Malla via the Kabuli pundit Abdul Mejid in 1860. The Russians rebuilt the fortress at Julek and demolished the Yani Kurgan fortress the next year. As Kokand gradually expanded their dominion north into the area occupied by Kazakhs subject and to Tokmak, and others that had already occupied, relations with Russia further deteriorated into an all out war.

Dissatisfaction with high taxes and Alimqul's hostility towards the population of Kokand led to Malla-Khan's overthrow and assassination, and replacement by Shah Murad Khan.
