= Islamic Union of the Northern Provinces =

The Islamic Union of the Northern Provinces (Ittehadiya Islami-ye Wilayat-i Shamal) was a Turkic nationalist group which fought in the Soviet–Afghan War. Its leader was Azad Beg, the grandson of Khudayar Khan, successfully recruited local warlords for the north of Afghanistan into a loose alliance of Turkic-speaking Mujahideen. His aim was to establish a military and political voice for the Turkish minorities of Afghanistan. After the defeat and withdrawal of Soviet forces, Azad Beg tried to consolidate the political power and aligned himself with Rashid Dostum.

The party was founded in 1981 in Peshawar with Pakistani government assistance.
