= Palace of Khudáyár Khán =

Royal residence in Kokand, Uzbekistan

- Uzbek: Xudoyorxon saroyi
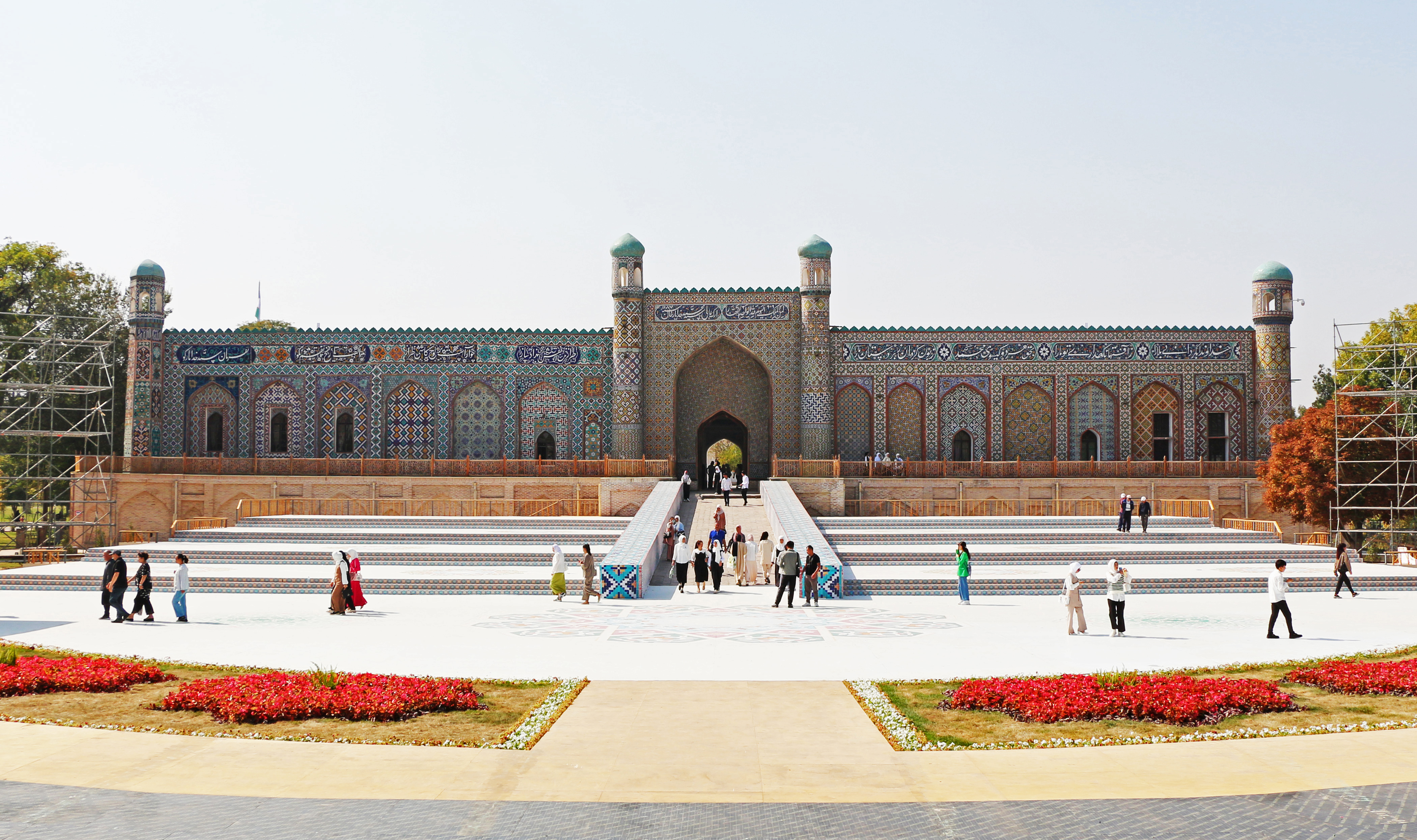
- View of Khudayar Khan Palace from Muqimi park
- Interactive map of the Palace of Khudáyár Khán area

General information
- Type: Royal residence (1870–1876); Military hospital (1941–1945); Museum (1925–present)
- Architectural style: Timurid, Uzbek
- Location: Kokand, Uzbekistan
- Coordinates: 40°32′19.0″N 70°56′16.0″E
- Construction started: 1865
- Completed: 1870
- Client: Kokand Khans
- Owner: Uzbek state

Technical details
- Structural system: Various low buildings surrounding courtyards, pavilions and gardens

Design and construction
- Architect: Mir Ubaydulla Muhandis

The Palace of Khudayar Khan, known as the Pearl of Kokand, was the palace of the last ruler of the Kokand Khanate, Khudayar Khan. It is the most visited tourism attraction in Uzbekistan’s Fergana Valley.

== History ==
The Palace of Khudayar Khan, also known as Kokand Urda, was built in the early 1870s. It was the last in a series of seven palaces, each grander than the last, and it was intended to project the power of the khan. The architect was Mir Ubaydullo, and the palace is said to have been built by 80 master builders and 16,000 conscripted labourers. The American diplomat Eugene Schuyler described the palace as being "much larger and more magnificent than any other in Central Asia... glittering in all the brightness of its fresh tiles, blue, yellow and green."

During the Russian Conquest of Central Asia, Tsarist troops seized and liquidated the Khanate of Kokand, turning it into a vassal state. Khudayar Khan initially took a pro-Russian stance but was forced into exile, leaving his palace behind. The property was looted.

During the Bolshevik Revolution, Kokand and from 1917-18 had an anti-Bolshevik Provisional Government. When the Bolsheviks did take control of the city in 1918, they demolished the majority of the palace, including all of the harem, leaving just 19 original rooms out of nearly 120.

In 1938, under the leadership of architect Obid Zayniddinov, a renovation project was carried out in the Palace of Khudayar Khan; an architect Kadirjon Haydarov, carver S. Norkoziyev and other masters took part in the repair. As a result of the researches in 1974 (architectors N. Akromkhojayev, E. Nurullayev, etc.), the original state of the palace was determined. In 1924, an exhibition of agricultural achievements was opened in the Palace of Khudoyorkhan. Since 1925, the Museum of Local History of the city of Kokhan has been operating in the palace.

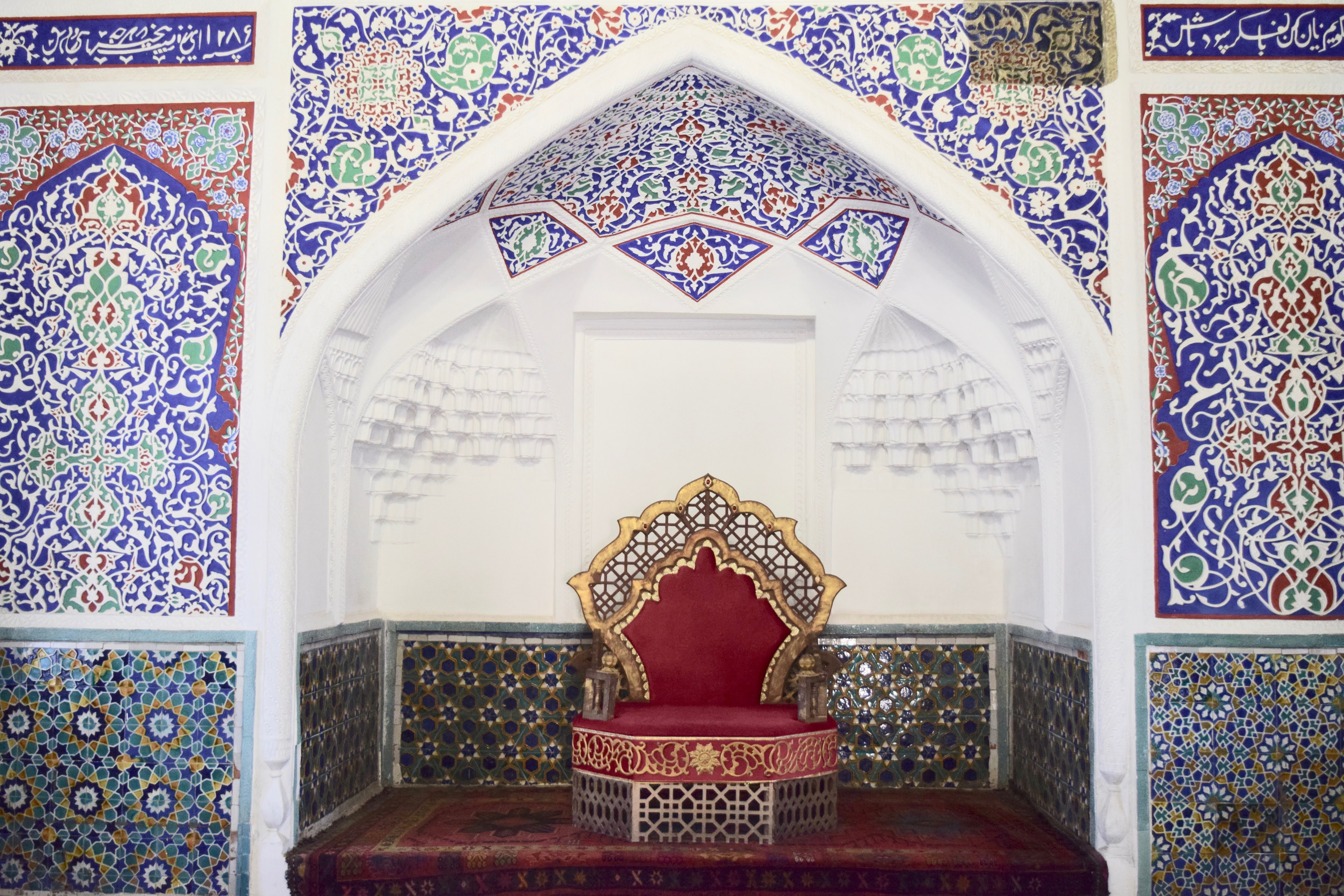
Palace Khudayar Khan Throne Replica

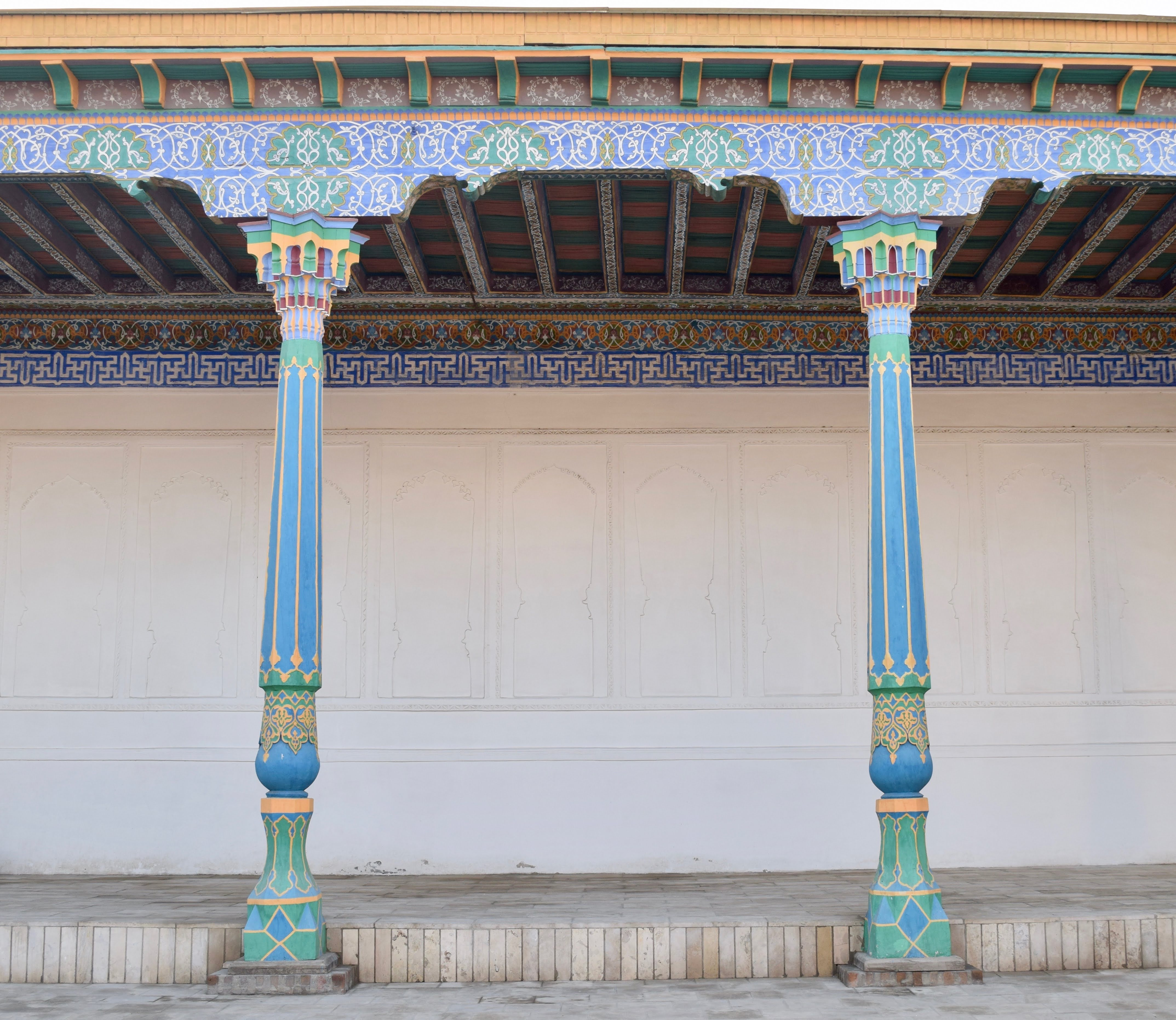
Palace Khudayar Khan

== Description ==
The palace stands within landscaped gardens in the centre of Kokand. The total site is four hectares, and the original building was 138 m long and 68 m wide. The main entrance is 5 m above ground level and accessed via a ramp.

The entire facade is richly tiled, with a mixture of geometric patterns and inscriptions. Above the gateway, an Arabic inscription reads “High Palace of Seid Muhammad Khudayar Khan”. The use of yellow and green in the colour scheme makes this building distinct (and dates it later) than the mostly blue and turquoise monuments found elsewhere in Uzbekistan.

Originally the palace had seven courtyards and 114 (or, by some accounts, 119) rooms. Of these original spaces, 5 courtyards and 19 rooms survive. Many of the interiors have been restored, and there are particularly fine examples of wood carving, panelled and painted ceilings, and wall paintings. The restored throne room has replica throne, which visitors can sit on. Khudayar Khan's original throne is now in the Hermitage Museum in St Petersburg, Russia.

== Construction ==
Constructed by sixteen thousand conscripted or enslaved workers using one thousand carts to transport materials, the eighty master builders designed and built an ornate structure of variegated colors and rich ornaments with geometric patterns, arabesques, and floral motifs all made from ceramic tiles and based on tales of the Orient.

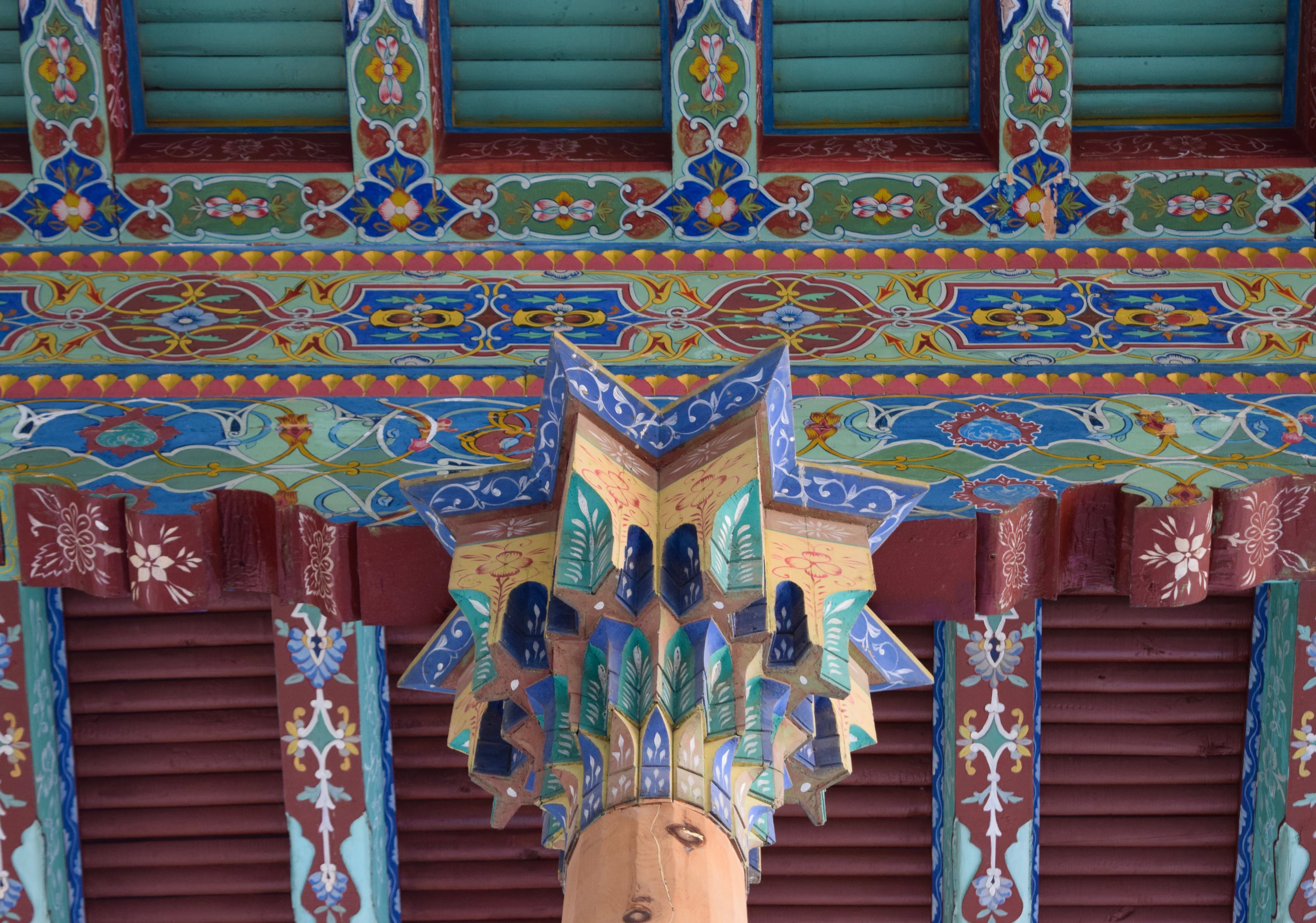
Khudayar Khan Palace Ceiling

== Reconstruction ==
In 2009, the restoration works began in the palace. Restoration of the right side of the main building facade has been completed. Woodcarvers recreated several new doors and eight columns. The infrastructure of the museum has been improved.

In 2011, based on the decision of the first President of the Republic of Uzbekistan "On measures to radically improve the architectural image of the city and the infrastructure of the city", the second restoration of the palace was started. Metal fences with national motifs were installed around the palace, the north-western part of the palace was demolished, and the local history museum was re-equipped.

== Current use ==
Today the palace is a national monument and a museum. It is open to the public and guided tours are available. The palace is also used as a venue for many of Kokand’s festivals and events, including the biennial International Festival of Handicrafters.

== See also ==
- Sitorai Mokhi-Khosa
- Toshhovli Palace
- Nurullabai Palace
- Sokh fortress
