= Shir Ali Khan (Kokand) =

- Khan of Kokand
- Reign: c. 1842 — 1845
- Predecessor: Muhammad Ali Khan
- Successor: Murad Beg Khan
- Born: c. 1792; Kokand
- Died: c. 1845; Kokand
- Religion: Sunni Islam

Shir Ali Khan (Note: Chagatai and Persian: شیر علی خان) was the Khan of Kokand from June 1842 to 1845. He belonged to the Ming tribe that ruled Kokand.

He was the father of Muhammad Khudayar Khan and Muhammad Malla Beg Khan, and a cousin of Umar Khan and Alim Khan. After a popular revolt against the Bukhari occupation of Kokand, Nasrullah Khan and the puppet governor he installed, Ibrahim-Dadhoh was expelled to Khujand. Shir Ali struggled to revive the khanate from the brief but destructive occupation by Bukhari forces. In 1843 he managed to re-annex Tashkent to the khanate and take control of several other portions of land that were once part of the Kokand Khanate.

During his reign, the Kirghiz and Qipchaq tribes began a struggle over control of the state.

In 1845, Shir Ali was executed in Osh, as part of a conspiracy led by the mingbashi (general) Musulmonqul to overthrow him, out of the belief that Kyrgyz Kipchaks had grown too powerful. Alim Khan's son, Murad Beg, killed Shir Ali and was briefly declared khan, but soon overthrown because he was perceived as a puppet of Bukhara by the people of Kokand.
