= Battle of Ican =

Battle in the Russian conquest of Central Asia

- Part of the Russian conquest of Central Asia
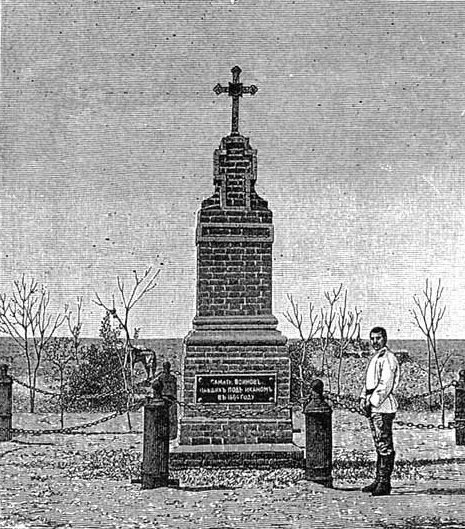
- Monument in honor of the battle
Date	16–18 December [O.S. 4-6 December] 1864
Location	Ikan, Kokand Khanate (Modern day Kazakhstan)
Result	Russian victory (Note: Cossacks were able to break through the encirclement and stop Alimqul raid deep into Turkestan)
Territorial changes	Alimqul evacuate Turkistan Region leaving only Tashkent

Belligerents
Khanate of Kokand	Russian Empire

Commanders and leaders
(Khanate of Kokand) Alimqul (WIA)	(Russian Empire) Vasili Serov

Strength
10,000	114

Casualties and losses
200 killed or wounded	102 killed or wounded

The Battle of Ican (Russian: Иканское сражение, romanized: Ikanskoye srazhenie), occurred on 16 December 1864 near Ikan as a part of the Russian conquest of Central Asia. In the battle, a Kokand army under the command of Alimqul was defeated by a cossack detachment.

== Background ==
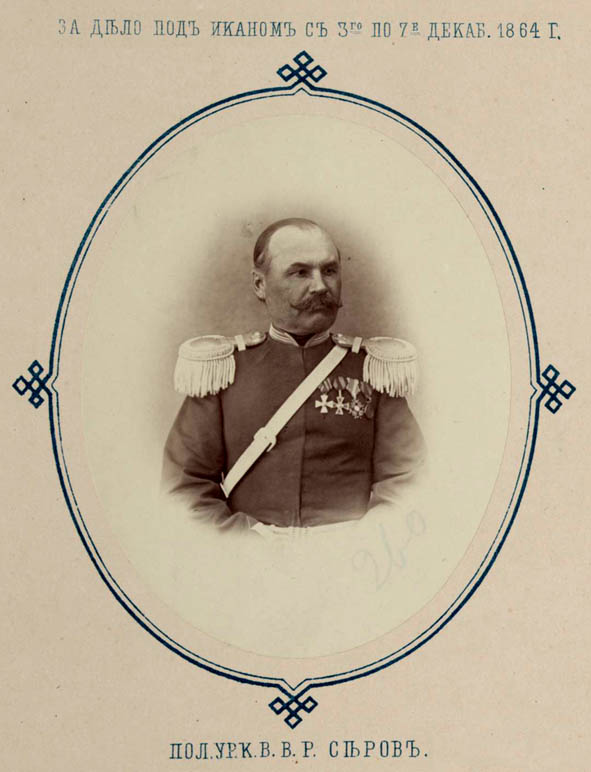
Colonel Vasili Serov

After taking Shymkent, the Kokand khan Alimqul tried to return to the city secretly, but the Russians noticed small groups of the Kokand vanguard and sent a hundred cossacks under the command of Vasily Serov without knowing about real size of the Kokand army.

== Battle ==
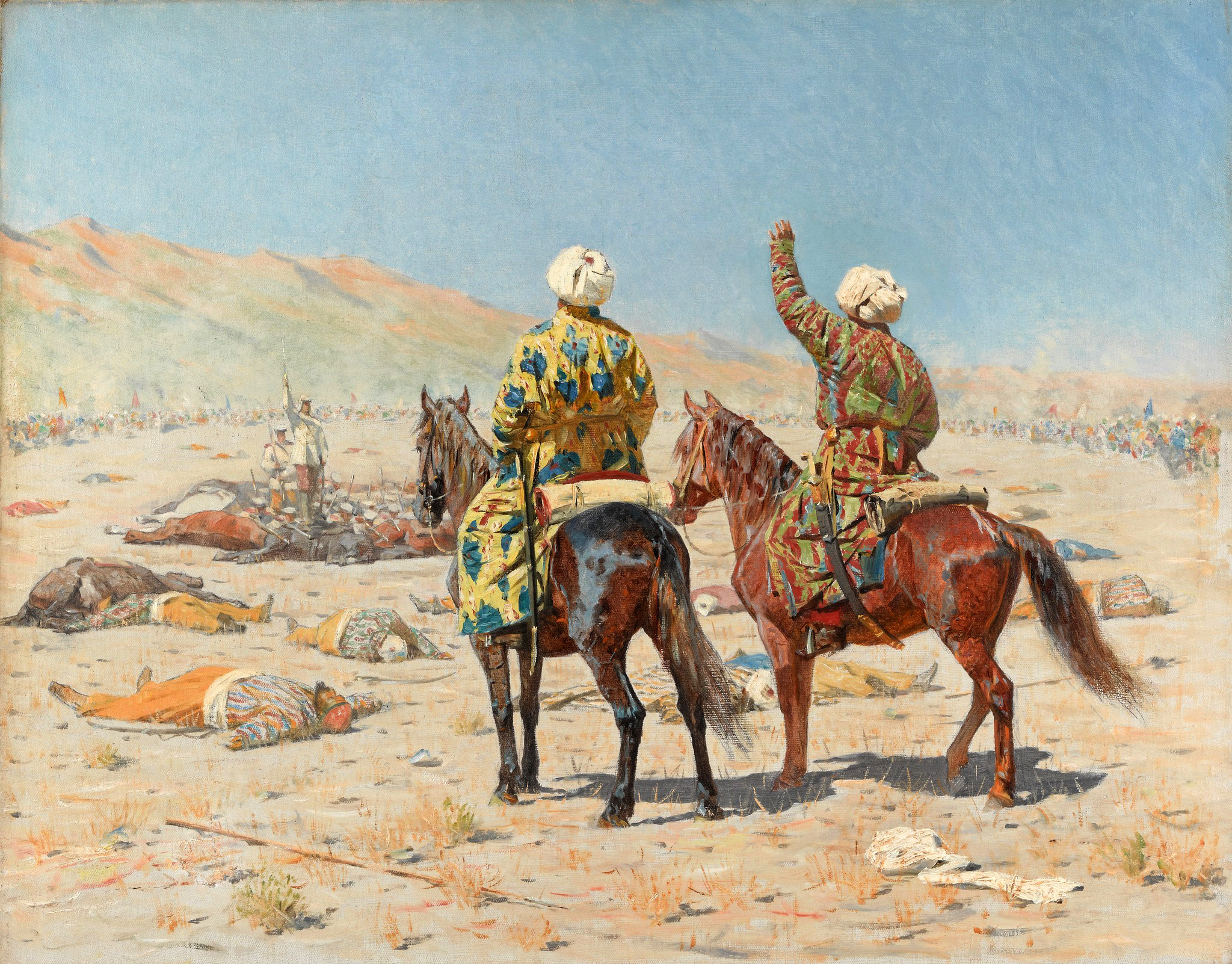
«Give up! Go to hell!» by Vasily Vereshchagin

As a result, the Kokand army surrounded the cossacks. At this time, a detachment of 150 people and 20 guns try breaking through to Serov, but they received an order to retreat due to the large enemy army. The Cossacks shot back at the Kokand forces for two days, surrounded by the bodies of dead comrades and horses, and finally Alimqul sent them a letter:

Where are you going to leave me now? The detachment sent from Azret has been defeated and driven back; not one of your thousand (!) will remain — surrender and accept our faith: I will not offend anyone!

Gunfire was heard in response. Serov understood that time was not on his side and he decided to break out of the encirclement. He gathered the remaining Cossacks and, shouting "hurrah" in the form of a Infantry square, attacked the enemies surrounding him and broke through their formation. The Cossacks retreated for several more miles, until finally a new expedition saved the detachment and took them to Shymkent on carts.

== Aftermath ==
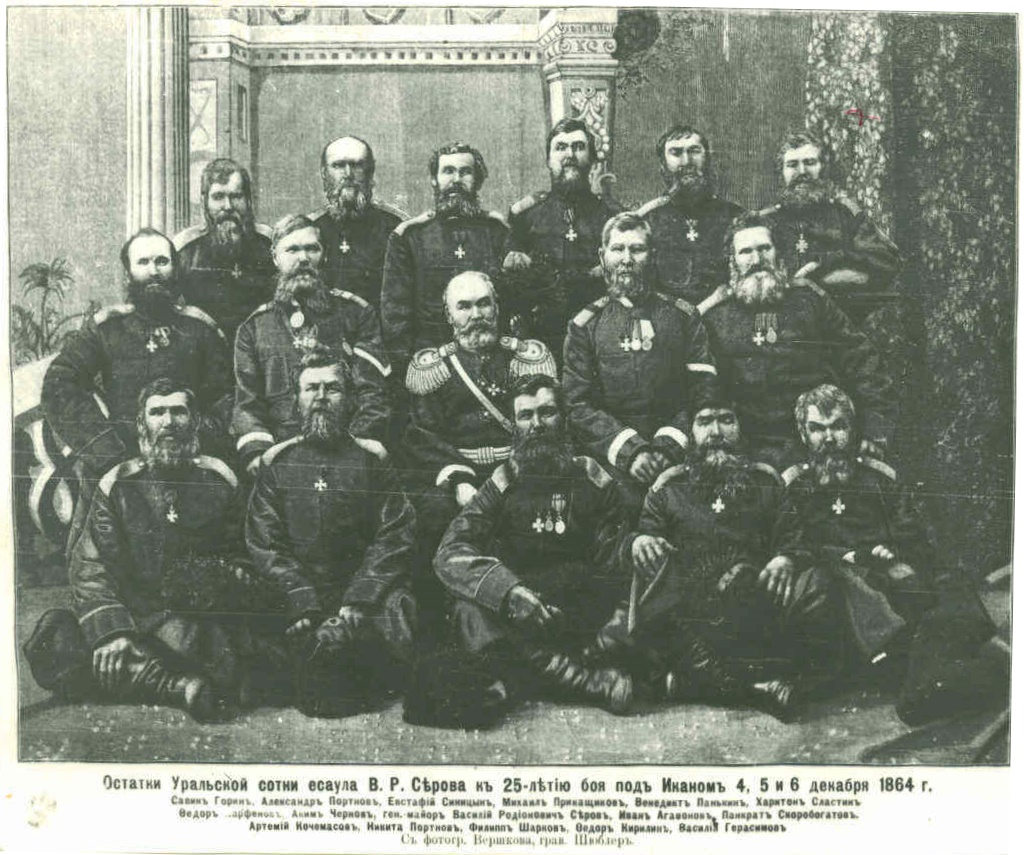
Participants of the Ican battle 20 years later

The battle ended with the retreat of Alimqul. Russian detachment losing 2 officers, 5 constables, 87 cossacks, 4 artillerymen, 2 paramedics, and 2 Kazakh escorts.
