= Pulat Khan =

- Khan of Kokand
- Reign: 1875-1876
- Predecessor: Nasruddin Khan
- Born: c. 1844/1846
- Died: 1876; Margilan
- Religion: Sunni Islam

Pulat Khan (Note: Chagatai and Persian: پولاد خان Kyrgyz: Полот хан, romanized: Polot xan), also known as Iskhak-Mulla-Khassan-Ogly or Iskhak Khasan-uulu (Note: Chagatai and Persian: اسحاق حسن اوغولی Kyrgyz: Искак Асан уулу, romanized: İsqaq Asan ûlu), was the final ruler of the Khanate of Kokand. The son of a tobacco merchant, he became khan after overthrowing Nasruddin Khan, but was executed by the Russians.

== Early life ==
Pulat Khan was born in 1844 or 1846, to a tobacco merchant from Piskent named Mollah Iskak. He later claimed to be the son of Atalik Khan.

== Reign ==
Kokand was informally turned into a protectorate of the Russian Empire by treaties signed in 1868 and 1872. The elite of Kokand opposed this course of events and overthrew Muhammad Khudayar Khan in July 1875. Nasruddin Khan was placed onto the throne. Konstantin Petrovich von Kaufmann, governor-general of Russian Turkestan, feared that Kokand might ally with the Khanate of Bukhara or Yettishar and then, with British support, oppose Russia's presence in the region.

The Russians launched an invasion in August 1875, and Nasruddin signed a treaty on 22 September, which formally established Kokand as a Russian protectorate. All of Kokand's territory on the right bank of the Syr Darya and Naryn rivers were ceded to Russian Turkestan.

Nasruddin was overthrown on 10 October 1875, and replaced by Pulat. Pulat positioned his forces in the Alay Range, but was defeated by the Russians. Emperor Alexander II of Russia signed a decree on 19 February 1876, which annexed the khanate into the Russian Empire. Pulat was captured shortly after the annexation. He was executed by hanging in Margilan for killing 12 Russian prisoners of war.

== Works cited ==
=== Books ===
- Howorth, Henry (1880). History of the Mongols: From the 9th to the 19th Century - Part II The So-Called Tartars of Russia and Central Asia. Longman.
- Pierce, Richard (1960). Russian Central Asia 1867-1917: A Study in Colonial Rule. University of California Press. ISBN 9780520362369.

=== Journals ===
- Abashin, Sergei (2014). "The 'fierce fight' at Oshoba: a microhistory of the conquest of the Khoqand Khanate". Central Asian Survey. 33 (2). Routledge: 215–231.
