= Deligrad Event =

Attempted elevation of Serbia from a Principality to a Kingdom

The Deligrad Event (Serbian: Делиградски догађај) was an attempt to elevate the Principality of Serbia to a kingdom during the Serbian–Ottoman Wars (1876–1878). When the Great Powers agreed on ten days of ceasefire (3–13 September 1876), Imperial Russian Army general and Commander of the Armed Forces of the Principality of Serbia Mikhail Chernyayev, who opposed peace with the Ottomans, went on 4 September to General Kosta Protić and asked him to declare the proclamation of a kingdom to the Army. The Army immediately swore Oath to "King Milan". The Great Powers opposed, and Prince Milan informed Chernyaev that he could not accept the declaration; Chernyaev replied that he was to leave with all Russian military if it was not accepted. Chernyaev assured that the recognition by the Great Powers was unnecessary, that the proclamation of kingdom raises the morale of the army and Serbian people, because "a kingdom means independence". It was compensation for the victims and the main profit of the war, which in his view, should continue after the truce for two months. He claimed that during that time, Russia would provide greater assistance to Serbia than even necessary. Prince Milan, pressured by the Great Powers, stated that he would not accept the proclamation. Chernyaev gave up on his threats, however, in order to save his reputation, the Prince's decision was not informed to the Morava–Timok Army. On 16 September a Serbian offensive began and failed, after which Chernyaev left Serbia and the Great Powers took on the initiative in Constantinople to suspend the war.
