= Mikhail Chernyayev =

Russian military leader and politician (1828–1898)

Mikhail Grigoryevich Chernyaev
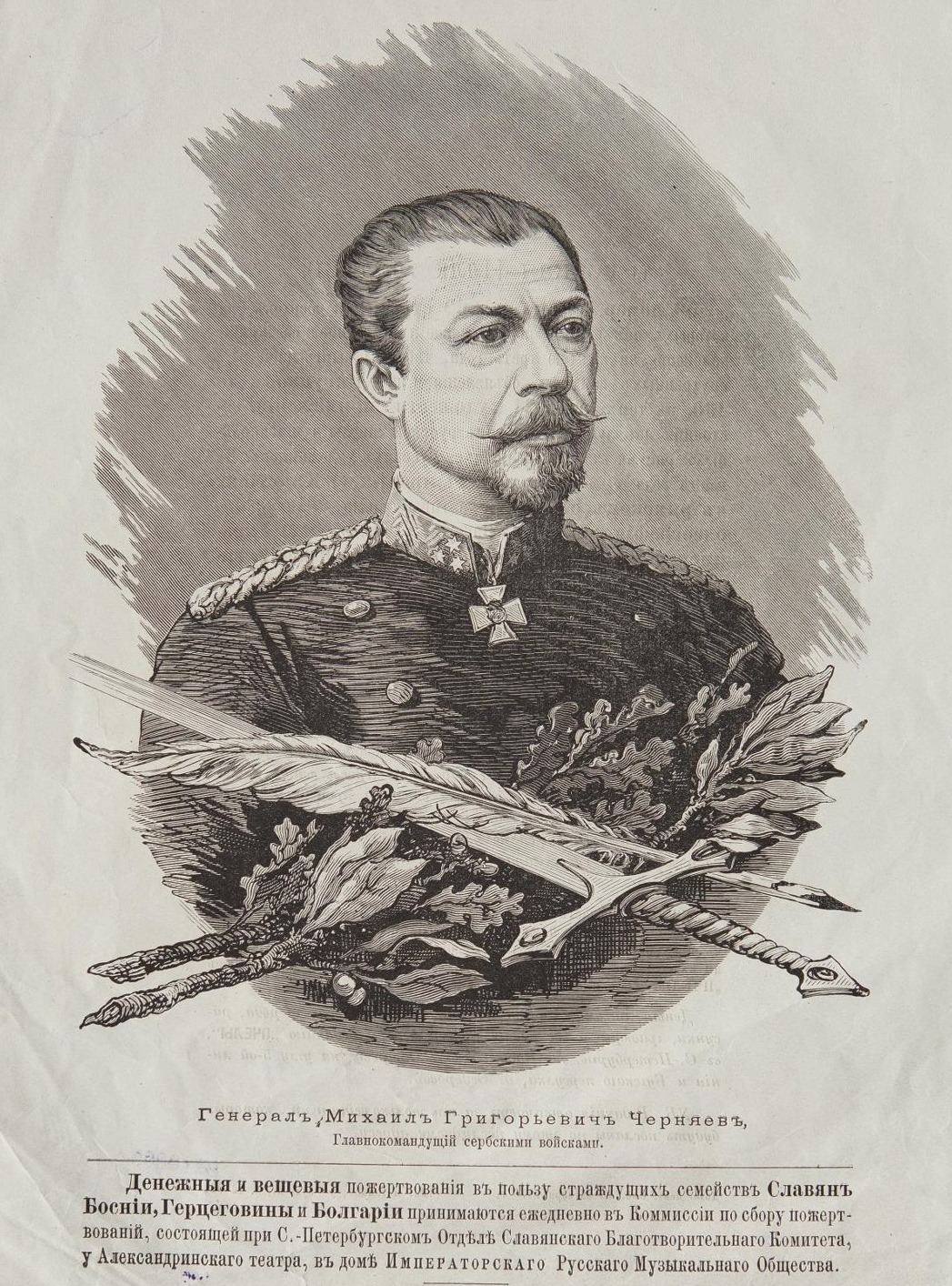
- Mikhail Grigoryevich Chernyaev
- Born: 22 October 1828; Bender, Bessarabia Governorate, Russian Empire
- Died: 16 August 1898 (aged 69); Mogilev Governorate, Russian Empire
- Occupation: major general
- Known for: Russian conquest of Turkestan: Siege of Tashkent

Mikhail Grigoryevich Chernyaev (Russian: Михаил Григорьевич Черняев) (3 November / 22 October 1828 in Bender, Bessarabia Governorate – 16 August 1898) was a Russian major general, who, together with Konstantin Kaufman and Mikhail Skobelev, directed the Russian conquest of Central Asia during the reign of Tsar Alexander II.

== Life ==
Mikhail Chernyaev was born in 1828 in Bender, in the Bessarabia Governorate of the Russian Empire. He belonged to a Russian noble family descended from Novgorodian boyars. His father was Grigory Nikitich Chernyaev (1787 – 1868), an officer, a participant of the Battle on Borodino. His father was a commandant of a number of French towns after the defeat of Napoleon. During 1841, he was appointed the city governor of Berdiansk. He was educated at the Nicholas Staff College, enlisted in the army in 1847, and distinguished himself in the Crimean War and in the Caucasus Mountains region. After serving as divisional Chief of Staff in Poland, he went to Orenburg in 1858 as assistant to the commander of the line of the Syr-Darya, and the next year commanded an expedition to assist the Kazakh tribes on the borders of the Aral Sea against the Khanate of Khiva. He did duty on the staff of the Army of the Caucasus for a time, and returned to Orenburg as Chief of Staff.

During 1864, having gained the rank of Major-General, Chernyaev made his famous march with 1000 men across the steppes of Turkestan to Chimkent (Shymkent) in the Khanate of Kokand, to meet another Russian column from Semipalatinsk (Semey), in Siberia, in conjunction with which he successfully captured Chimkent, and then unsuccessfully attacked Tashkent, 130 km farther south. Wintering at Chimkent, he captured Tashkent the next year. This was contrary to his instructions, and although he was received in St. Petersburg with enthusiasm, and presented with a sword of honor by the emperor, he was not again employed by the Russian military service, and retired from it in July 1874.

He bought, and edited with great success, the publication Russkiy Mir, devoting himself to Pan-Slavism. During the summer of 1876 he was appointed Commander-in-Chief of the Serbian army, but on entering Turkey in Europe was driven back by Osman Pasha, who followed him into Serbia, defeating him at Zaječar and Javor in July, and the campaign in Serbia proved disastrous. He rashly proclaimed Milan Obrenović IV as King Milan I of Serbia during September's (Deligrad Event), and in October Aleksinac and Deligrad were occupied by the Turks, and the road to Belgrade little defended. An armistice was concluded, and Chernyaev resigned his command.

In 1877 he visited Austria-Hungary in relation to his propaganda, but was expelled, and lived for a time in France. In 1879 he organized a Bulgarian rebellion, but was arrested at Adrianople (Edirne) and sent back to Russia. He succeeded to von Kaufmann as Governor of Turkestan in 1882, but his bellicose plans for the Great Game with the British Empire resulted in his replacement two years later, when he was appointed a member of the council of war at St. Petersburg. In 1886 his opposition to the Central Asian Military railway caused him to be dismissed from the council. Chernyaev died in 1898 at his country estate in Mogilev Governorate.

Chernyaev was awarded the highest Serbian order of the time, Order of the Cross of Takovo.
