= Murad Beg Khan =

- Khan of Kokand
- Reign: 1845
- Predecessor: Shir Ali Khan
- Successor: Muhammad Khudayar Khan
- Born: c. 1812; Kokand
- Died: 1845; Kokand
- Father: Alim Khan
- Religion: Sunni Islam

Murad Beg Khan (Note: Chagatai and Persian: مراد بیگ خان) was briefly the Khan of Kokand in 1845, after he killed Shir Ali Khan.

== Biography ==
Murad Beg was a son of Alim Khan, who had ruled the Khanate of Kokand between 1801 and 1810.

As a result of a conspiracy by the anti-Kipchak party, the Kokand Khan Shir Ali Khan was executed in 1845 and Murad Beg Khan, son of the famous Kokand khan Alim Khan, was declared the new ruler of the Kokand Khanate. Murad Bey appealed to the Khan of Bukhara for help, and occupied Kokand without much resistance.

The leader of the Kipchaks, mingbashi (general) Musulmonqul, who was absent with the army, collecting taxes from the Kyrgyz, reacted immediately. Musulmonqul returned from the territory of the Kyrgyz with the army and recovered the city with the support of the citizens of Kokand, which were very hostile towards the Khan of Bukhara,

Having reigned for only 11 days, Murad Khan was killed by Musulmonqul. He then brought Muhammad Khudayar, the 14 year old son of Shir Ali Khan, from Namangan to Kokand, where he was declared Khan with Musulmonqul as regent, and was also married to Musulmonqul's daughter.
