= Alimqul =

Alimqul (also spelt Alymkul, Alim quli, Alim kuli) (ca. 1833–1865) was a warlord in the Kokand Khanate, and its de facto ruler from 1863 to 1865.

Alimqul was born in Budjun Batken, 1833, into a family of a Kyrgyz-Kipchak beys. He studied in madrasahs in Andijan and Kokand, earning the title of mullah, and for a while he himself served as the biy of Qurghan Tepa, near Andijan.

In 1858, Alimqul helped Malla Beg (Malla Bek) overthrow his brother Khudayar Khan by bringing the Kyrgyz over to Malla Beg's side. Malla Beg, upon seizing the Kokandian khan's throne in November 1858, rewarded Alimqul with several successive promotions. In 1860, already governor of Marghilan, Alimqul was in charge of a large Kokandian force that defeated invaders from the Emirate of Bukhara.

Alimqul actively participated in the struggle for power that ensued after the death of Malla Beg in a February, 1862, coup. He soon succeeded in thwarting Bukhara's attempt to bring Khudayar Khan back to power. Not being of royal blood himself, Alimqul elevated Malla Beg's minor son, Sultan Sayyid Khan as a titulary khan, and ruled the country himself as Atalyk and commander in chief of the military (Amir-i Lashkar).

In late 1864, Alimqul was instrumental in sending Buzurg Khan and Yaqub Beg to Kashgar. Once established as Kashgar's ruler, Buzurg and Yaqub sent Alimqul an ambassador, Mir Baba, with rich gifts. Although Mir Baba met with Alimqul, he did not have a chance to deliver the presents: Alimqul was wounded and died when defending Tashkent against the Russians in May 1865.

== Literature ==
- Timur Beisembiev. The Life of Alimqul: A Native Chronicle of Nineteenth Century Central Asia. Published 2003, Routledge (UK). 280 pages. ISBN 0-7007-1114-7.
- Beisembiev T. K. Kokandskaia istoriografiia : Issledovanie po istochnikovedeniiu Srednei Azii XVIII-XIX vekov. Almaty, TOO "PrintS", 2009, 1263 pp., ISBN 9965-482-84-5.
- Beisembiev Timur K. "Annotated indices to the Kokand Chronicles". Tokyo: Research Institute for Languages and Cultures of Asia and Africa, Tokyo University of Foreign Studies. Studia Culturae Islamica. № 91, 2008, 889 pp., ISBN 978-4-86337-001-2.
- Beisembiev T.K. "Ta'rikh-i SHakhrukhi" kak istoricheskii istochnik. Alma Ata: Nauka, 1987. 200 pp. Summaries in English and French.
