= Nasruddin Khan =

Sayid Nasruddin Abdal Karim Khan Kokandi
- Khan of Kokand
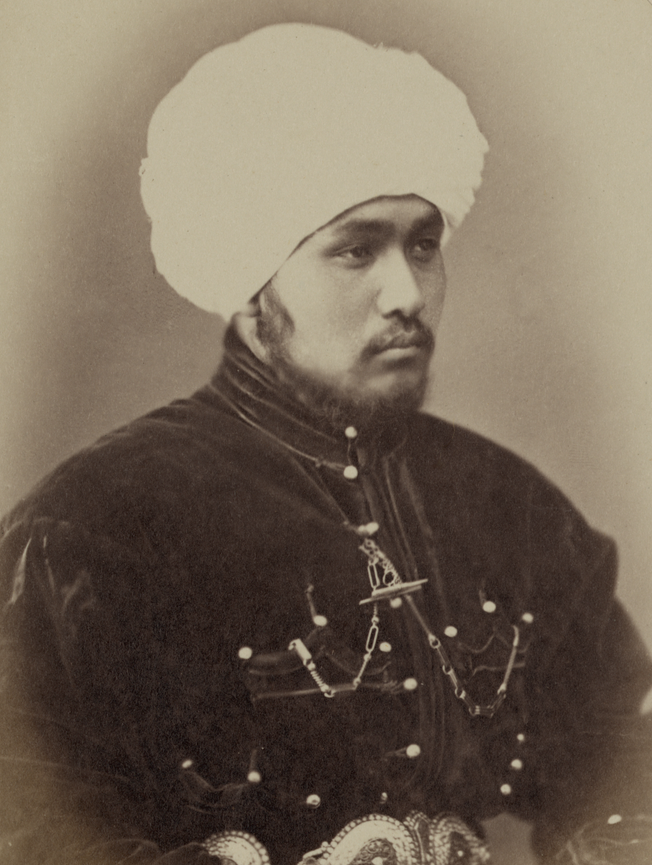
- Reign: 1875 — 1876
- Predecessor: Khudayar Khan
- Born: 1850
- Died: 1893 (aged 42–43); Peshawar
- Father: Muhammad Khudayar Khan
- Religion: Sunni Islam

Nasruddin Khan (Note: Chagatai and Persian: نصر الدین خان), or Mirza Nasruddin Beg (Note: Chagatai and Persian: نصر الدین بیگ) was the penultimate ruler of the Khanate of Kokand. Nasruddin's father was overthrown in 1875, and he was placed onto the throne. The Russians, fearing an anti-Russian alliance, launched an invasion and Kokand was reduced to a protectorate of the Russian Empire. Nasruddin was overthrown on 10 October 1875.

== Early life ==
Nasruddin Khan was born in 1849 or 1850, as the son of Muhammad Khudayar Khan, leader of the Khanate of Kokand.

== Reign ==
Kokand was informally turned into a protectorate of the Russian Empire by treaties signed in 1868 and 1872. The elite of Kokand opposed this course of events and overthrew Khudoyar in July 1875. Nasruddin was placed onto the throne. Konstantin Petrovich von Kaufmann, governor-general of Russian Turkestan, feared that Kokand might ally with the Khanate of Bukhara or Yettishar and then, with British support, oppose Russia's presence in the region.

The Russians launched an invasion in August, and defeated a large Khoqandi army on 22 August. Makhram was the only fortified place between the border and the capital Kokand. The Russians had six men die and eight wounded taking Makhram while the Khojend saw over 1,100 men die and lost 39 cannons to the Russians. The capital was seized on 29 August, and the remainder of the country was seized by September. Nasruddin signed a treaty on 22 September, which formally established Kokand as a Russian protectorate. All of Kokand's territory on the right bank of the Syr Darya and Naryn rivers were ceded to Russian Turkestan.

Nasruddin was overthrown on 10 October 1875, and replaced by Pulat Khan. Nasruddin attempted to retake his throne, but the Russians imprisoned him in Tashkent. Emperor Alexander II of Russia signed a decree on 19 February 1876, which annexed the khanate into the Russian Empire.

== See also ==
- Azad Beg

== Works cited ==
=== Books ===
- Howorth, Henry (1880). History of the Mongols: From the 9th to the 19th Century - Part II The So-Called Tartars of Russia and Central Asia. Longman.
- Pierce, Richard (1960). Russian Central Asia 1867-1917: A Study in Colonial Rule. University of California Press. ISBN 9780520362369.

=== Journals ===
- Abashin, Sergei (2014). "The 'fierce fight' at Oshoba: a microhistory of the conquest of the Khoqand Khanate". Central Asian Survey. 33 (2). Routledge: 215–231.
