= Muhammad Khudayar Khan =

Sayid Muhammad Khudayar Khan
- Khan of Kokand
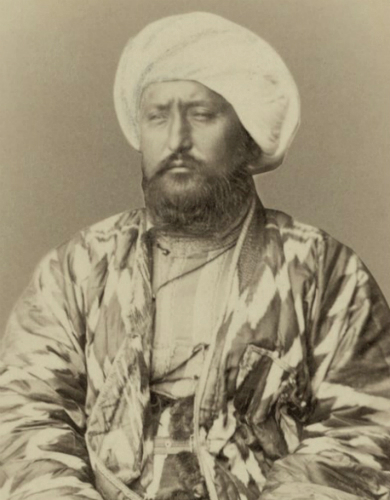
- Reign: 1845 — 1875
- Predecessor: Murad Beg Khan
- Successor: Nasruddin Khan
- Born: 1831; Kokand, Fergana Valley, Khanate of Kokand (present-day Uzbekistan)
- Died: 1882 (aged 50–51); Herat, Emirate of Afghanistan (present-day Afghanistan)
- Father: Shir Ali Khan

Sayid Muhammad Khudayar Khan (Note: Chagatai and Persian: سید محمد خدایار خان), usually abbreviated to Khudayar Khan, was an Uzbek Khan of Kokand who reigned between 1845 and 1875 with interruptions. He was the son of Shir Ali Khan. During the reign of Khudayar Khan, the Khanate was suffering from a civil war and from interventions of the Emir of Bukhara. Subsequently, the Russian invasion into Central Asia first forced the Khanate to become a vassal of the Russian Empire, and in 1876 the Khanate was abolished as a result of the suppression of an uprising. In 1875, Khudayar Khan, who took a pro-Russian position, during the uprising had to flee to Orenburg in Russia. He died in exile.

== Prelude to rule ==
In 1845, Shir Ali Khan was killed during the uprising. His son Murad Beg Khan was declared the khan briefly, however, he was soon overthrown and eventually executed by the supporters of Shir Ali Khan, since he was considered to be a puppet of the Emir of Bukhara. The main political figure in the Khanate was Mingbashi Musulmonqul, a military commander, who declared Khudayar Khan, his son-in-law, the khan of Kokand. Khudayar was in Namangan during the uprising and thus survived. In the 1840s, Khudayar Khan was essentially locked in the palace in Kokand, whereas the Kipchak nomad elite under Musulmonqul had all the power in the Khanate. In 1853, there was an uprising against the Kipchaks, and a large number of them were killed, including Musulmonqul. Khudayar Khan continued to rule on his own and took an anti-Kipchak and pro-Uzbek position. He put the northern parts of the Khanate under special government, and appointed Mirza Akhmad to be the governor. In 1858, the northern provinces rebelled. Khudayar Khan sent his brother Malla Bek to Tashkent to suppress the rebellion. Instead, Malla Bek joined the rebels, conquered Kokand, and proclaimed himself a khan. He was supported by Alimqul, a Kipchak and a powerful warlord. Khudayar had to flee.

== Rise to power ==
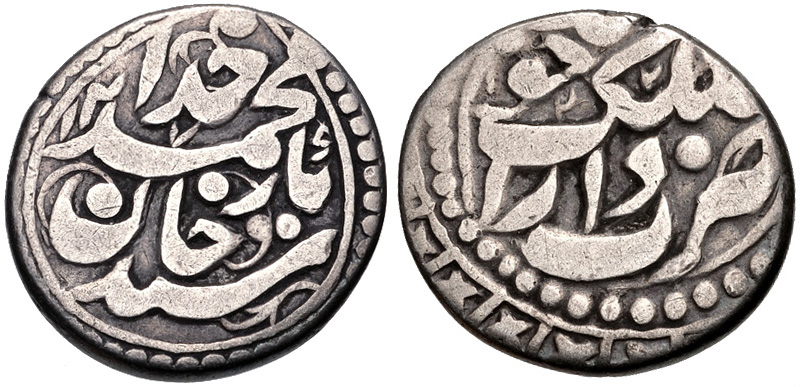
Silver tenga of Muhammad Khudayar Khan, struck at the Kokand mint, dated 1862–1863

In 1862, Muhammad Malla Beg Khan was assassinated, and his nephew, Shah Murad Khan, became the khan. The ruler of Tashkent, Kanaat, allied with Khudayar, and Shah Murad besieged Tashkent. At the same time, Muzaffar, the Emir of Bukhara, advanced to Kokand. As the result, the Kokand army disappeared, the siege of Tashkent was lifted, and Khudayar moved to Kokand and declared himself a khan. In the meanwhile, in Osh, Alimqul got rid of possible throne claimants, promising all of them the throne, prompting them to go to Osh and executing them. In July 1863, he proclaimed Muhammad Sultan Khan, a son of Muhammad Malla Beg Khan, the Khan of Kokand. Alimqul himself was a regent, since Sultan was about thirteen years old. He launched an attack on the Khudayar's forces, and at the same time Muzaffar had to return to Bukhara to suppress a rebellion which started in Shahrisabz. Alimqul managed to agree with the Emir, launched simultaneous attacks on Kokand and Tashkent, and finally took them under control.

== Rule of Kokand and legacy ==
In the 1850s, the Russian Empire advanced to the Central Asia with the final goal of controlling the whole area. In 1865, Russian troops took Tashkent, and Alimqul, who opposed them, was killed in action. In Kokand, Kipchaks declared Hudaykul Bey the khan, however, after a fortnight he flew to Kashgar. Subsequently, Khudayar Khan entered Kokand without any resistance. In 1866, Russians proceeded to the south, occupying Khujand, and thus physically separating the Kokand Khanate and the Bukhara Emirate. In 1868, Khudayar formally accepted the sovereignty of the Russian Empire over the Khanate.

The reign of Khudayar Khan in the 1860s was notable for extremely high taxes and dysfunctional legal system, which was even worse than what his predecessors installed. In 1870, a plot was discovered, in which opponents of Khudayar Khan tried to replace him with Seyid Khan, a son of Mallya Khan, living in exile in Bukhara. When the plot was discovered, and Seyid Khan killed, the Emir of Bukhara, to avoid accusations in support of the plot, sent Khudayar Khan the names of conspirators and their supporters. This led to a large amount of executions. In 1875, an uprising forced Khudayar Khan to flee from the khanate.

In 1875, he was exiled by the Russians to Orenburg, where he lived for 2 years. Longing for his homeland, he fled to Herat in 1877. Kokand businessmen who sympathized with him gave him money to travel to Peshawar, Bombay and from there to Mecca. He then wandered around the Arabian provinces until, in the early 1880s, he settled in the village of Karukh, east of Herat. He died in 1886 in the village of Karukh, east of Herat, in complete poverty. His grave is also located there.

Under the orders of Khudayar Khan, his military officer Niaz-Muhammad ibn Ashur-Muhammad Khoqani wrote the Tarikh-i Shahrukhi, a Persian chronicle about the Khanate of Kokand. The palace built by Khudayar Khan is one of the landmarks of Kokand.

== Sources ==
- Bregel, Yuri (2020). "Historiography vi. Central Asia". Encyclopaedia Iranica Online. Brill. doi:10.1163/2330-4804_EIRO_COM_3101.
