= Sexuality in Uzbekistan =

Overview of sexuality in Uzbekistan

Sexuality in Uzbekistan encompasses the societal attitudes towards sexual topics, as well as norms and customs surrounding sexual activity. Due to the conservative nature of Uzbekistan's culture, open discussions on sexuality are generally discouraged, as there is a fear that such discussions will lead to sexual promiscuity and premarital sex.

== Cultural and legal aspects ==
=== Age of consent ===
The age of consent is 16 in Uzbekistan.

=== Premarital sex ===
While legal, premarital sex is extremely stigmatised in Uzbekistan, especially for girls. This is exemplified by a case study, wherein the idea of premarital sex caused disgust in most Uzbek teenagers and adults who were interviewed. Furthermore, one Uzbek mother likened the idea of her daughter engaging in premarital sex to death, stating "That is unthinkable ... That would be terrible ... It would be like death".

One study described the ideal young woman in Uzbek culture as being shy, quiet and without any need for any knowledge on sexual matters.

=== "Verification" of virginity ===
While there is a lack of data on the prevalence of the practice, virginity tests for women have been described as common, particularly in rural areas. These tests may be carried out by medical professionals.

Umida Akhmedova, a filmmaker and photographer, created a 2008 documentary titled The Burden of Virginity to explore the practice of virginity testing in Uzbekistan. Following the documentary's release, Ahmedova was charged with Defamation and Insult, under Uzbekistan's Criminal Code. She was accused of discrediting the traditions and values of Uzbekistan, and in 2010, was sentenced to 6 months imprisonment and up to 3 years of penal labor.

== Sex education ==
There are no compulsory courses on sex education in the education system of Uzbekistan. Most Uzbek adults believe that sex education should take place at home. However, many parents are reluctant to discuss sexual matters with their children, leading youth to turn to informal sources of information, such as peers.

== LGBTQ rights ==
Rights for LGBTQ individuals are limited in Uzbekistan. Article 120 of Uzbekistan's Criminal Code bans same-sex intercourse between men, which is punishable by up to three years imprisonment. While same-sex relations between women are legal, lesbians face significant discrimination. Furthermore, transgender individuals are frequently detained and prosecuted by law enforcement.

== Prostitution ==
Prostitution is illegal in Uzbekistan and selling sex is deemed an administrative offence, and is typically punished with fines. However, the clients of prostitutes are not usually punished.

In a sample of 2333 men, 4.4% reported paying for sex. Of these respondents, less than half reported using a condom while visiting a prostitute.

== See also ==
- Sexuality in Islam
