= Fergana =

City in eastern Uzbekistan

Fergana Fargʻona / Фарғона (Uzbek)
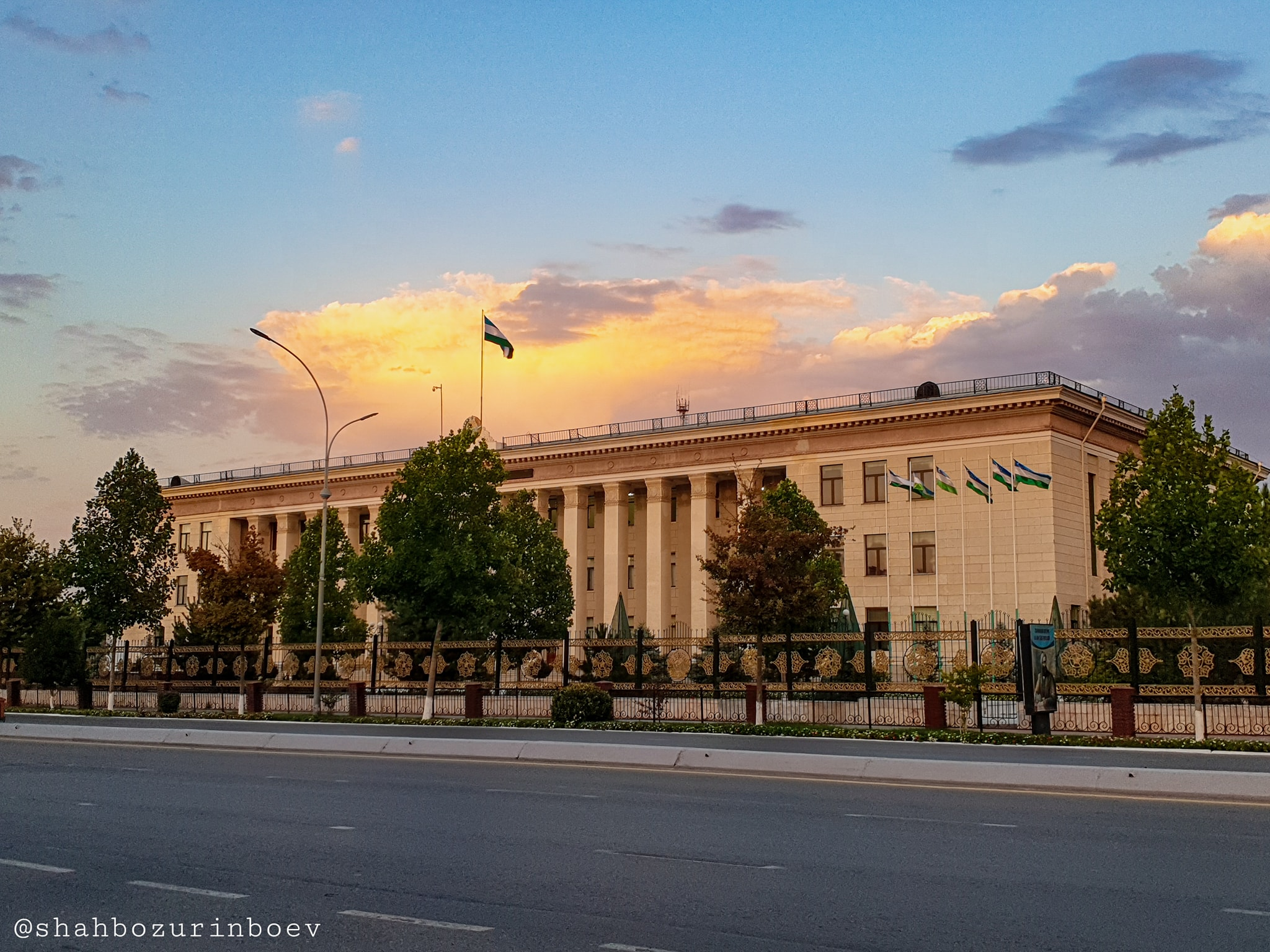
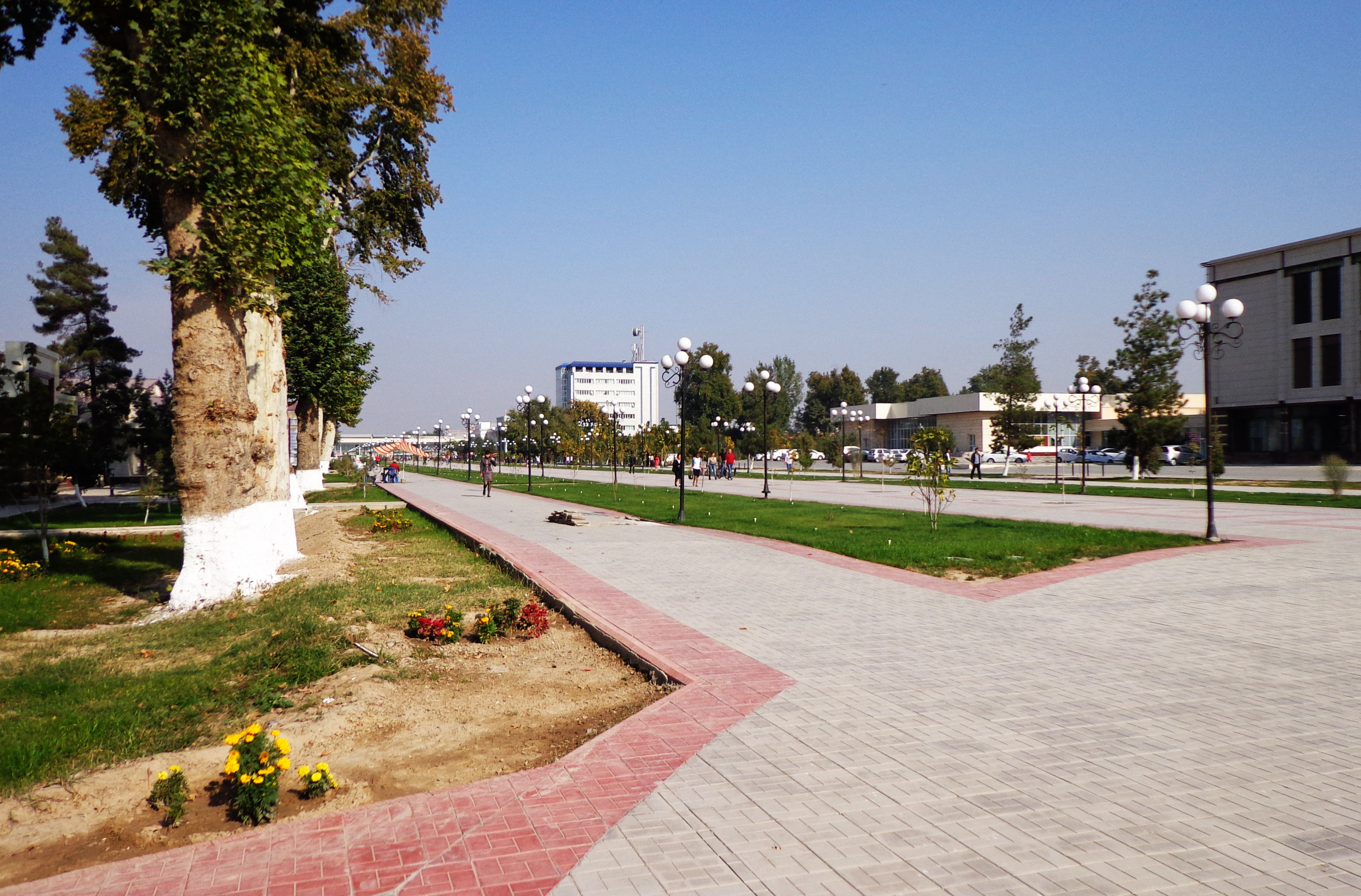
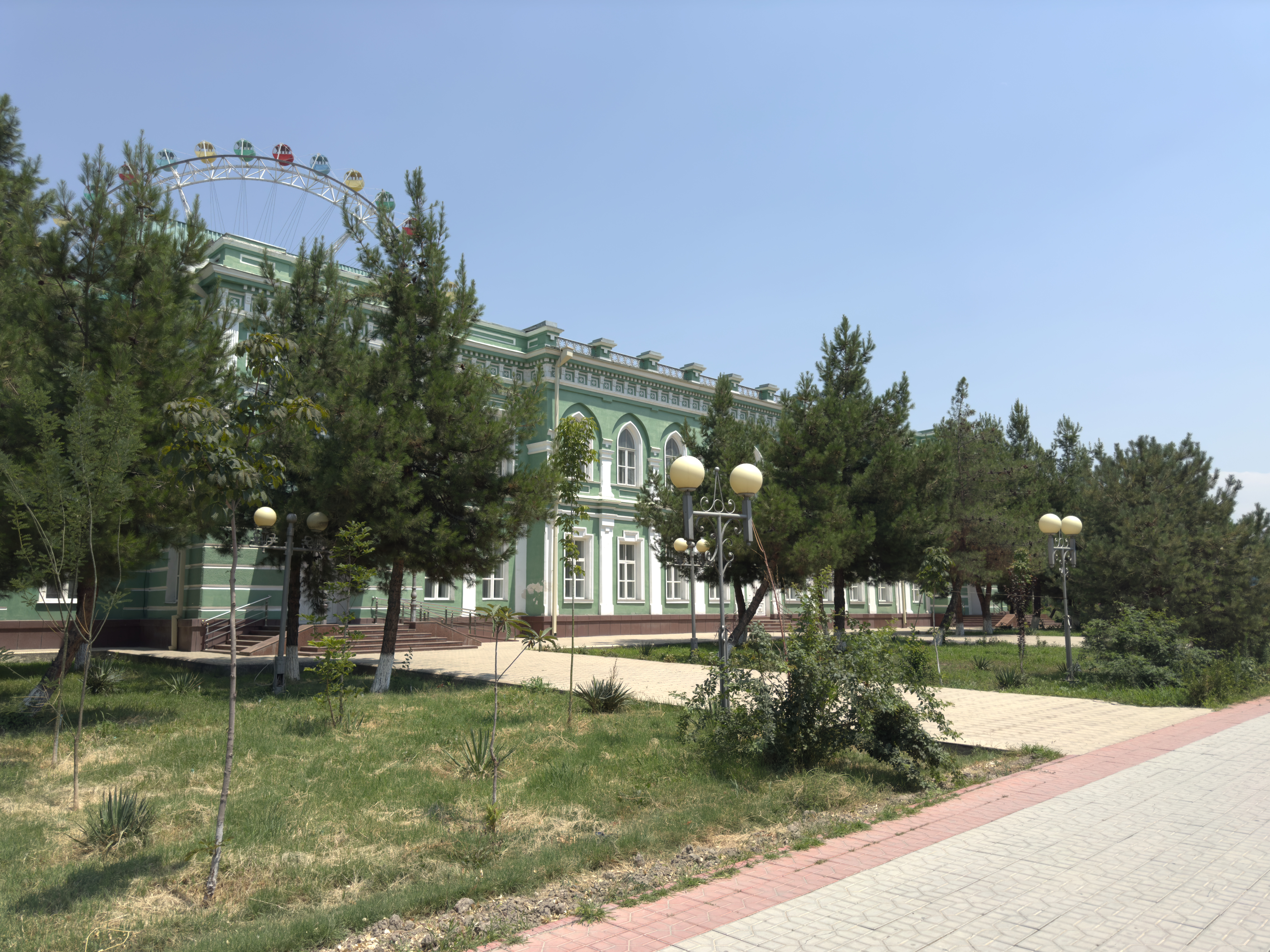
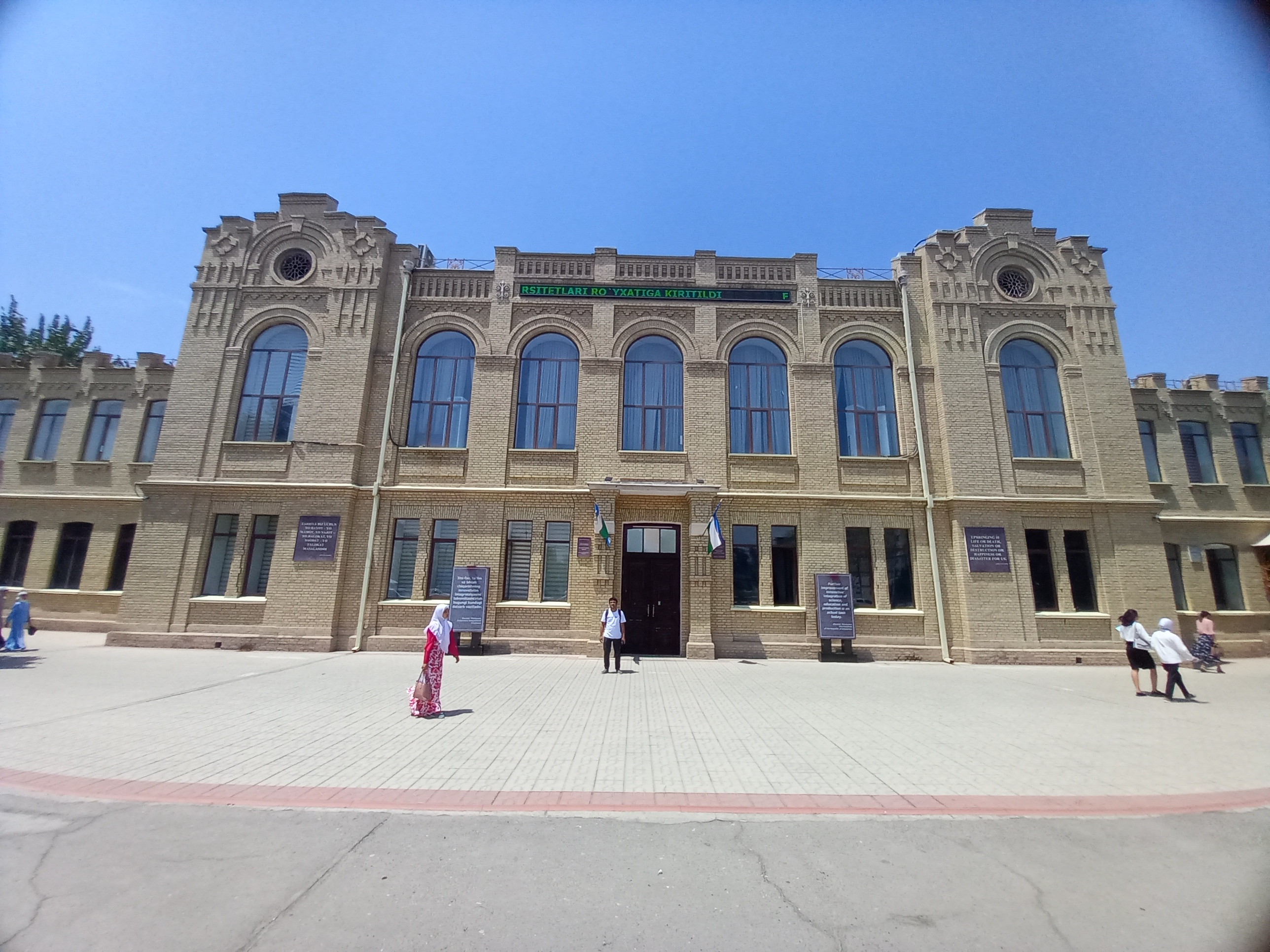
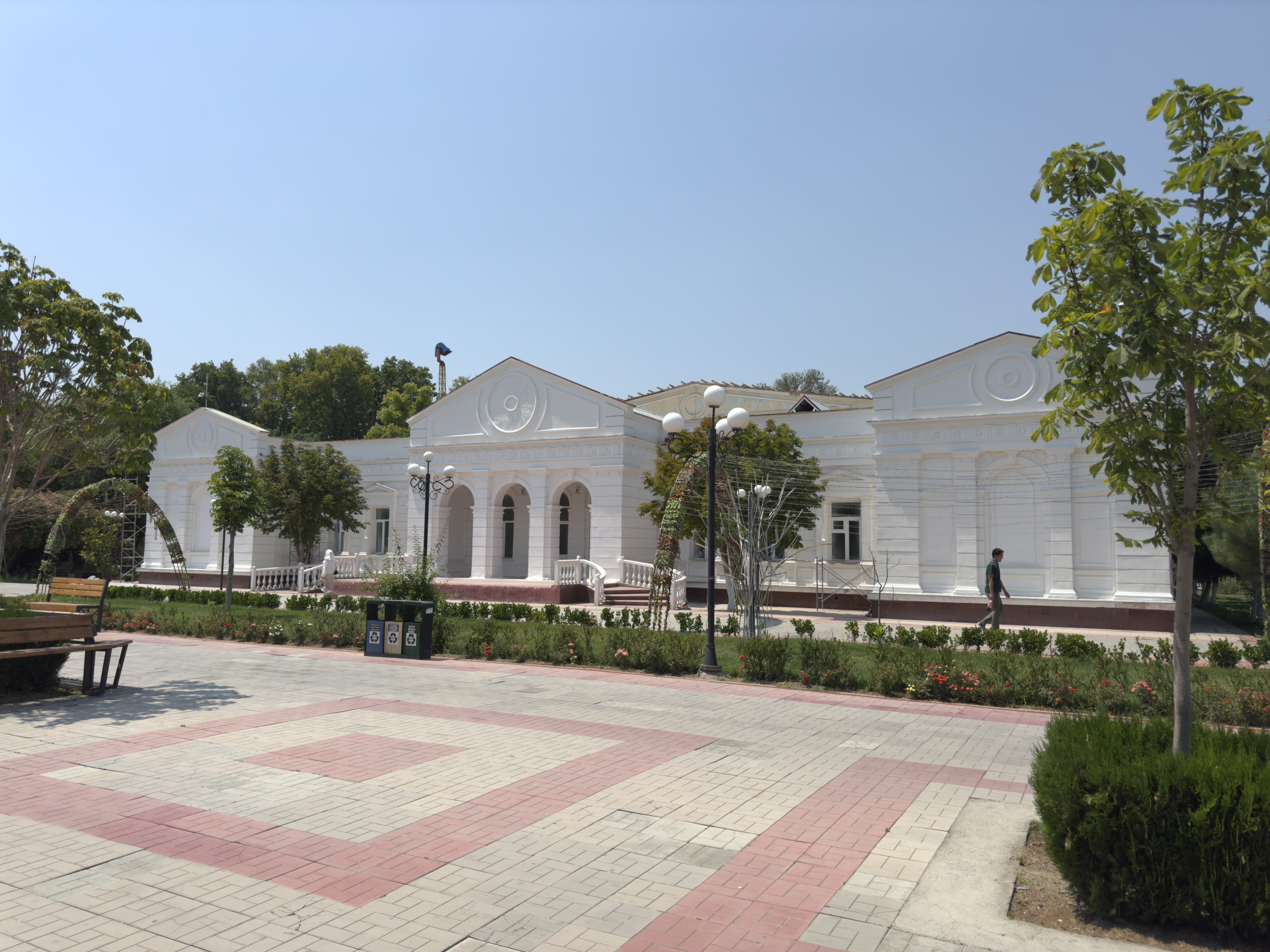
- Regional administration Alley in the city center Regional drama theater Fergana State University House of Culture

- Seal

- Location in Uzbekistan Fergana (West and Central Asia)
- Coordinates: 40°23′11″N 71°47′11″E
- Country: Uzbekistan
- Region: Fergana Region
- Established: 1876

Government
  - Type: City Administration
  - Mayor: Vosiljon Nazarov

Area
  - Total: 95.6 km^{2} (36.9 sq mi)
- Elevation: 590 m (1,940 ft)

Population (2026)
  - Total: 337,600
  - Density: 3,530/km^{2} (9,150/sq mi)
- Area code: (+998) 73
- Website: ferghana.uz

Fergana (/fɜːrˈɡɑːnə/; Uzbek: Fargʻona, pronounced [farʁɒˈna]) is a district-level city and the capital of Fergana Region in eastern Uzbekistan. Fergana is about 320 km (200 mi) east of Tashkent, about 75 km southwest of Andijan, and less than 20 kilometres (12 mi) from the Kyrgyzstan border. The modern city was founded in 1876.

== History ==
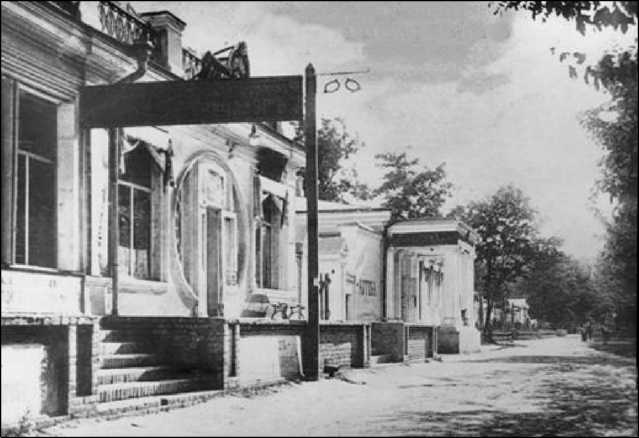
Gubernatorskaya street, 1913

Fergana first appears in written records in the 5th-century. However, archeological evidence demonstrates that the city had been populated since the Chalcolithic period. Like many other parts of Central Asia in the sixth and seventh-centuries, Fergana was ruled by the Western Turkic Khaganate. Although it was still predominantly inhabited by eastern Iranians, many Turks had also started to settle there. The city of Fergana was refounded in 1876 as a garrison town and colonial appendage to Margilan (22 kilometres or 13 1/2 miles to the northwest) by the Russian Empire.

Fergana Region is one of the centers of ancient culture in Uzbekistan. Photographs of Stone Age settlements and rocks found in the area show that stone tools have been used by people in the valley since ancient times. Excavations of the Great Fergana Canal have played an important role in the study of archaeological monuments in the region. During the excavation of the canal, monuments from the Bronze Age, slavery and land ownership were discovered and studied. Finds from the 5th century BC and early medieval period in the town of Quva are well studied. Historical sources from the 10th to 11th century state that this city was the largest and most prosperous in the valley after Akhsikath. Archaeological materials confirm that the city of Margilan was a large village in the 10th century and took on the appearance of a hamlet in the 11th and 12th centuries.

The monuments found in the settlements of the Chust culture, engaged in sedentary agriculture and animal husbandry, are important for the study of the Fergana Valley. Archaeological excavations show that the Fergana Region has long been inhabited by people engaged in hunting, farming, animal husbandry, and at later stages of the existence of human society, culture began to develop.

It was initially named New Margelan (Russian: Новый Маргелан), then renamed Skobelov (Скобелев) in 1907 after the first Russian military governor of the Fergana Valley, Mikhail Skobelev. In 1924, after the Soviet Union's reconquest of the region from the Basmachi movement, the name was changed to Fergana, after the province of which it was the centre.

During World War I, the city was the location of a Russian prisoner-of-war camp for German and Austro-Hungarian POWs, including ethnic Polish conscripts, many of whom died to typhus.

The industrial base of Fergana was developed in the 20th century. Industry in the city included textile manufacturing and a nitric fertiliser plant. Some of the industrial development was a result of Evacuation in the Soviet Union during World War II.

Fergana has been a center for oil production in the Fergana Valley since the region's first oil refinery was built near the city in 1908. Since then, more refineries have been added, and Fergana is one of the most important centers of oil refining in Uzbekistan. Natural gas from western Uzbekistan is transported by pipeline to the valley, where it is used to manufacture fertilizer. The Great Fergana Canal, built almost entirely by hand during the 1930s, passes through the northern part of the city and was completed in 1939. During its construction, the canal and the city were widely photographed by the noted photographer Max Penson. With a western loan Fergana is able to modernize its refinery and also reduce air pollution emissions.

== Climate ==
Fergana has a cool arid climate (Köppen BWk). Winters are cold and short, with a daily average low temperature of −2.6 °C (27.3 °F) and a daily average high of 4.8 °C (40.6 °F) in January; summers are hot, with an average low temperature of 20.6 °C (69.1 °F) and an average high of 35.1 °C (95.2 °F) in July. Annual precipitation is less than 188.1 millimetres or 7 inches, and most of this falls in winter and spring.

Climate data for Fergana (1991-2020, extremes 1881-present)
Month	Jan	Feb	Mar	Apr	May	Jun	Jul	Aug	Sep	Oct	Nov	Dec	Year
Record high °C (°F)	16.3 (61.3)	23.1 (73.6)	29.0 (84.2)	34.4 (93.9)	39.2 (102.6)	41.3 (106.3)	42.2 (108.0)	41.4 (106.5)	37.1 (98.8)	32.6 (90.7)	29.0 (84.2)	17.6 (63.7)	42.2 (108.0)
Mean daily maximum °C (°F)	4.8 (40.6)	8.0 (46.4)	15.4 (59.7)	22.5 (72.5)	28.1 (82.6)	33.2 (91.8)	35.1 (95.2)	33.9 (93.0)	29.2 (84.6)	21.4 (70.5)	12.9 (55.2)	6.3 (43.3)	20.9 (69.6)
Daily mean °C (°F)	0.5 (32.9)	3.2 (37.8)	9.9 (49.8)	16.3 (61.3)	21.4 (70.5)	25.9 (78.6)	27.8 (82.0)	26.3 (79.3)	21.2 (70.2)	14.1 (57.4)	7.1 (44.8)	1.9 (35.4)	14.6 (58.3)
Mean daily minimum °C (°F)	−2.6 (27.3)	−0.5 (31.1)	5.3 (41.5)	10.6 (51.1)	15.0 (59.0)	18.7 (65.7)	20.6 (69.1)	19.1 (66.4)	14.3 (57.7)	8.4 (47.1)	2.8 (37.0)	−1.2 (29.8)	9.2 (48.6)
Record low °C (°F)	−25.8 (−14.4)	−25.5 (−13.9)	−17.9 (−0.2)	−4.8 (23.4)	1.2 (34.2)	7.4 (45.3)	10.1 (50.2)	7.8 (46.0)	0.5 (32.9)	−7.4 (18.7)	−22.8 (−9.0)	−27.0 (−16.6)	−27.0 (−16.6)
Average precipitation mm (inches)	16.0 (0.63)	21.6 (0.85)	25.1 (0.99)	22.5 (0.89)	21.4 (0.84)	13.6 (0.54)	4.5 (0.18)	3.8 (0.15)	4.0 (0.16)	13.9 (0.55)	18.9 (0.74)	22.0 (0.87)	187.3 (7.39)
Average precipitation days (≥ 1.0 mm)	9	10	10	11	14	12	9	6	4	6	7	9	107
Average rainy days	4	7	10	10	13	10	8	5	4	6	7	6	90
Average snowy days	7	5	1	0.1	0.03	0.03	0.03	0	0	0.3	1	5	19
Average relative humidity (%)	81	76	67	61	56	48	48	52	56	66	74	82	64
Mean monthly sunshine hours	90.0	105.3	162.3	214.6	269.9	314.3	340.4	315.6	276.2	206.5	128.4	89.7	2,513.2
Source 1: Pogoda.ru.net
Source 2: NOAA

== Population ==
As of January 1, 2014, the city had a population of 264,900, making it the 3rd largest city in the Fergana Valley.

The town was Russian for the first time after its foundation. In 1911 its population consisted of 11,892 people. Of them Russians were 7,534 (63%), Sarts were 2,590 (22%). According to the 1926 census, of the 14,275 inhabitants in the city, there were 7,942 Russians (55%), 667 were Ukrainians (4.6%), and 514 were Jews (3.6%), while there were only 3,011 Uzbeks (21.0%).

As of 2013, Fergana is virtually mono-ethnic - of the city's 350,600 residents, 316,268 are Uzbek (90.0%). Of the remaining group, 12,084 Russians (3.4%), 3,114 Tajiks (1.1%), 2,028 Koreans (0.7%), and 626 Tatars (0.2%) also live in Fergana. There are also Azerbaijanis, Armenians, Jews, Germans and representatives of other nations.

== Demographics ==
The population of Fergana city is approximately 321,800 as of 2024, was 314,400 as of 2023, and 299,200 as of 2022. Uzbeks are the largest ethnic group, with Russian-speakers comprising about 25% of the city's population.

== Sport ==
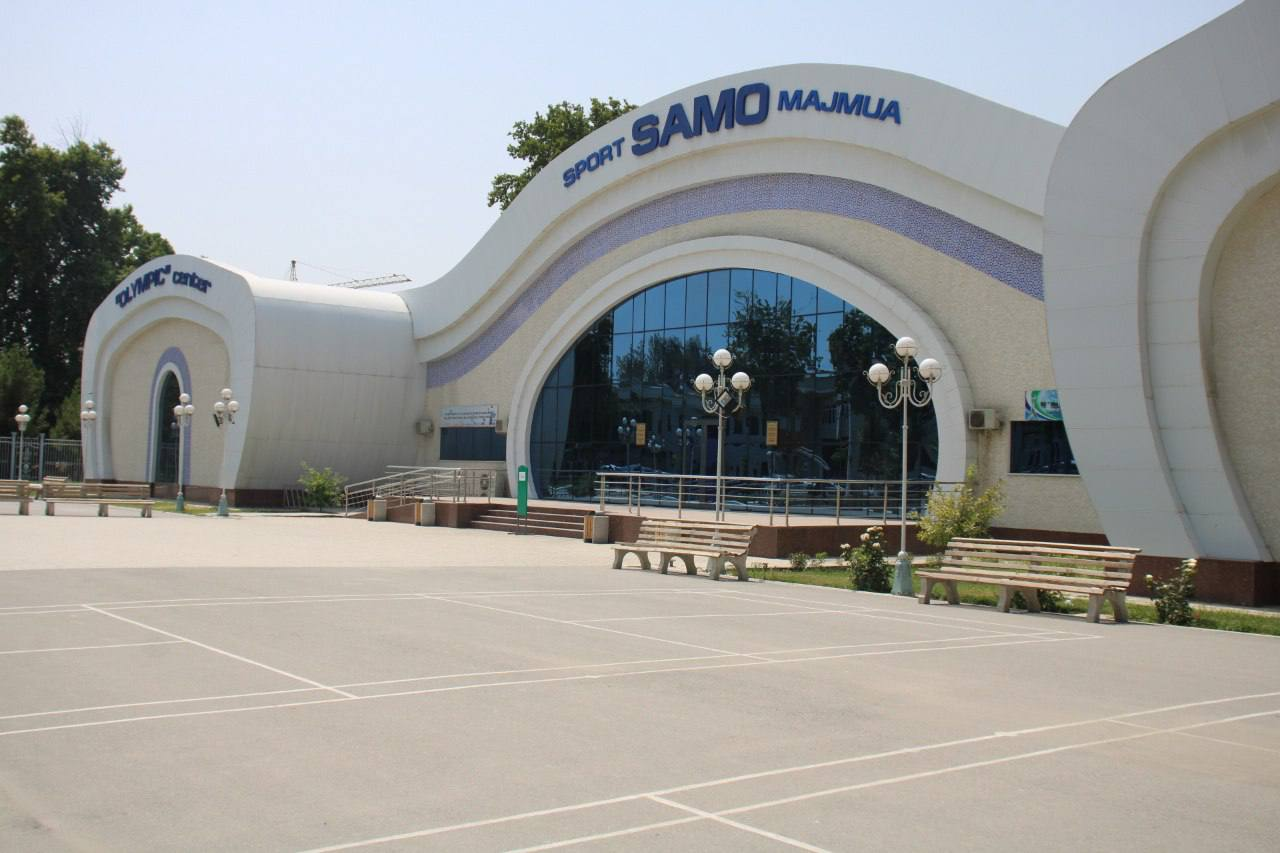
Samo Sports Complex

Thanks to independence, Uzbek sport is developing. Sports are becoming more and more popular in all regions of the country. The fact that in recent years world and Asian champions in various sports have appeared in Fergana Region testifies to the fact that physical culture and sports are becoming more and more popular among Fergana residents, especially among the youth. In 1991 there were only 17 stadiums in Fergana region, now there are 46,759 football fields and 33 modern tennis courts. Many sports facilities have been built in Fergana, such as Istiklol tennis complex, Kimyogar complex, swimming pool and Istiklol stadium, equipped with equipment that fully meets the world standards.

=== Sports clubs ===
- FC Neftchi Fergana
- FK Istiqlol Fergana

== Culture ==
=== Architecture ===
Fergana has a high proportion of Russians, Koreans and Tatars compared to other Fergana Valley cities. With its wide, tree-lined boulevards and Russian Empire-era buildings, and the Russian language spoken frequently on the streets, the city has a distinctly different feel from the rest of the region.

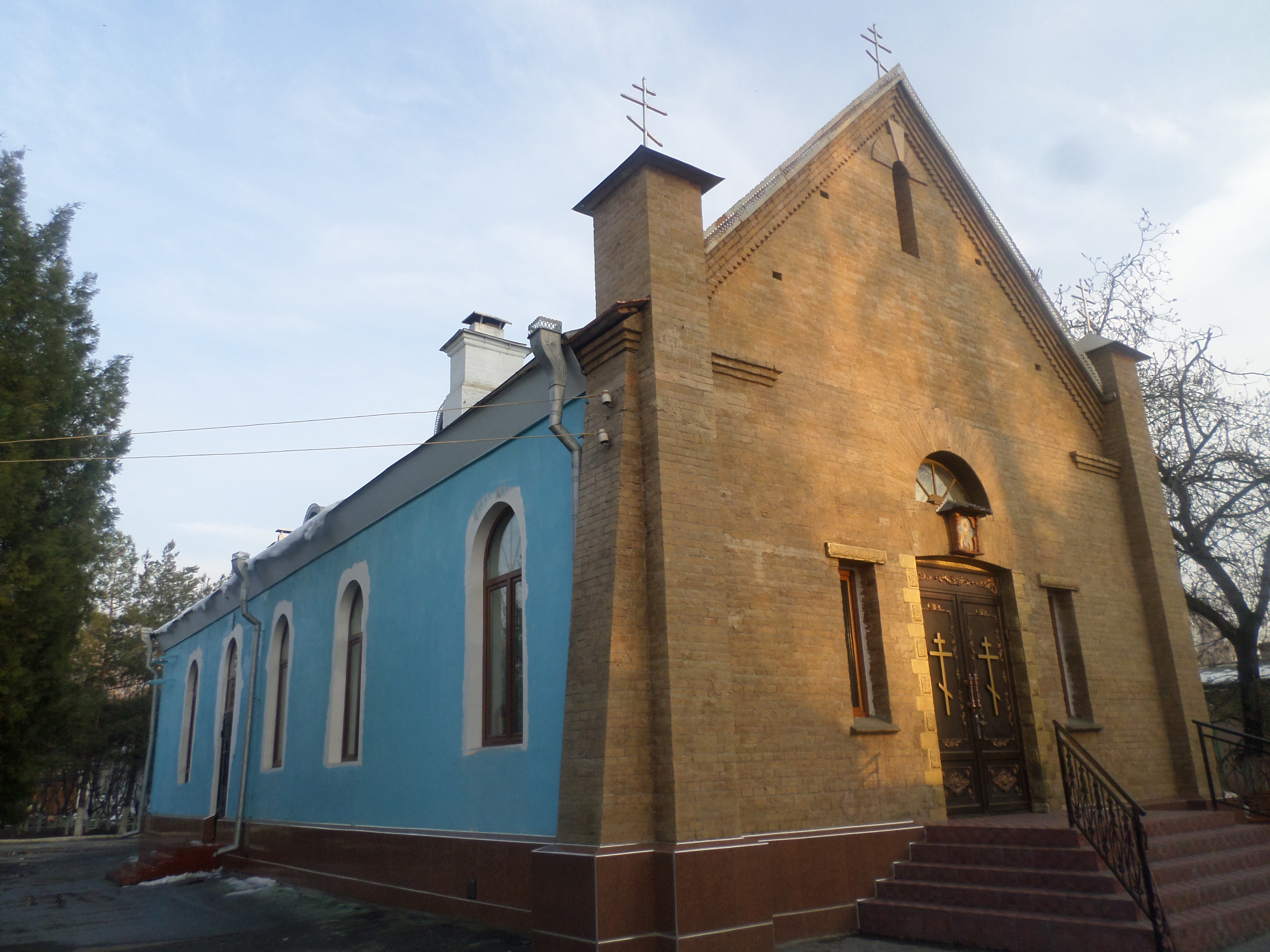
Uzbek Eastern Orthodox Church of Sergius of Radonezh

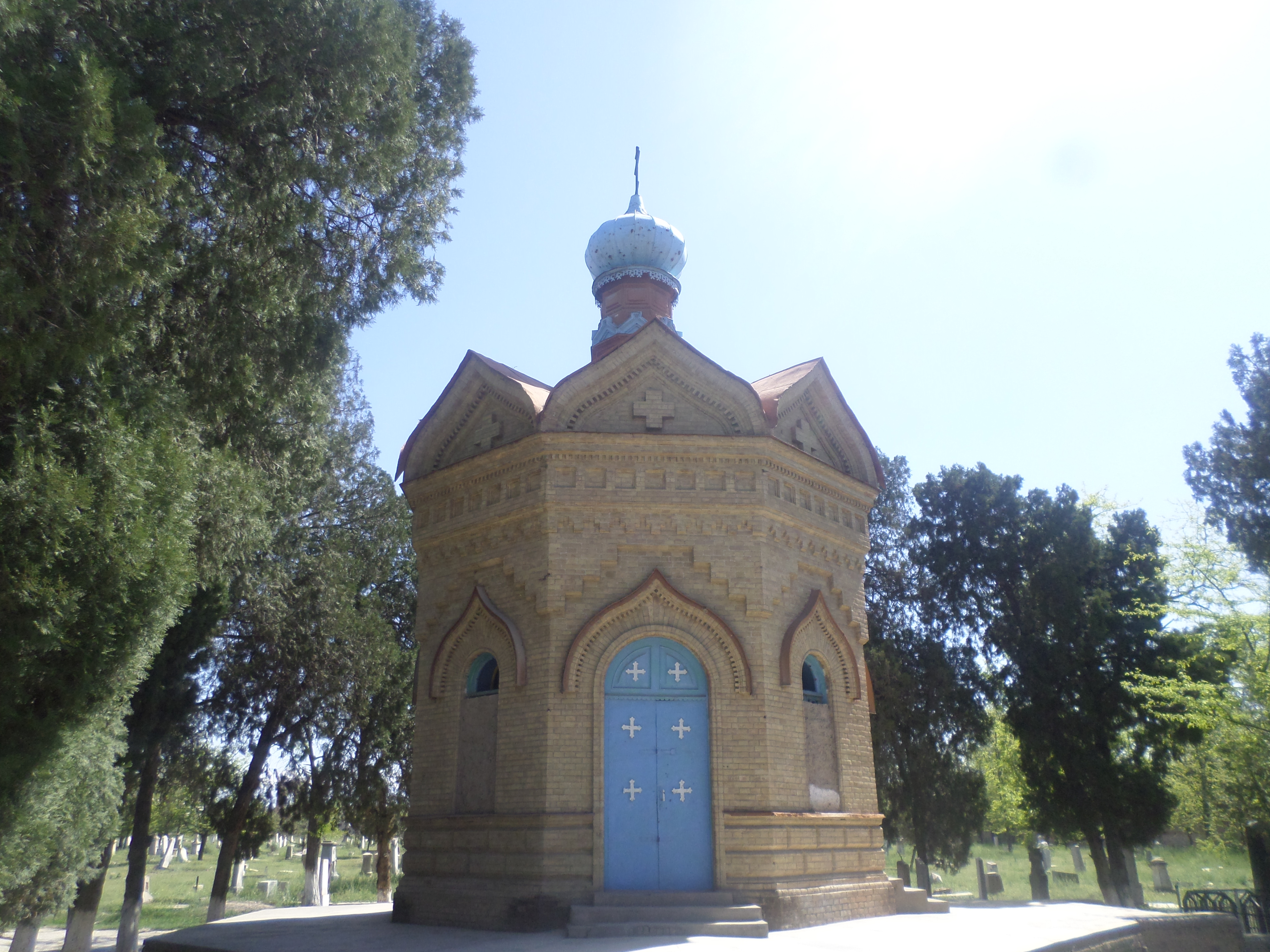
Chapel to Alexander Nevsky

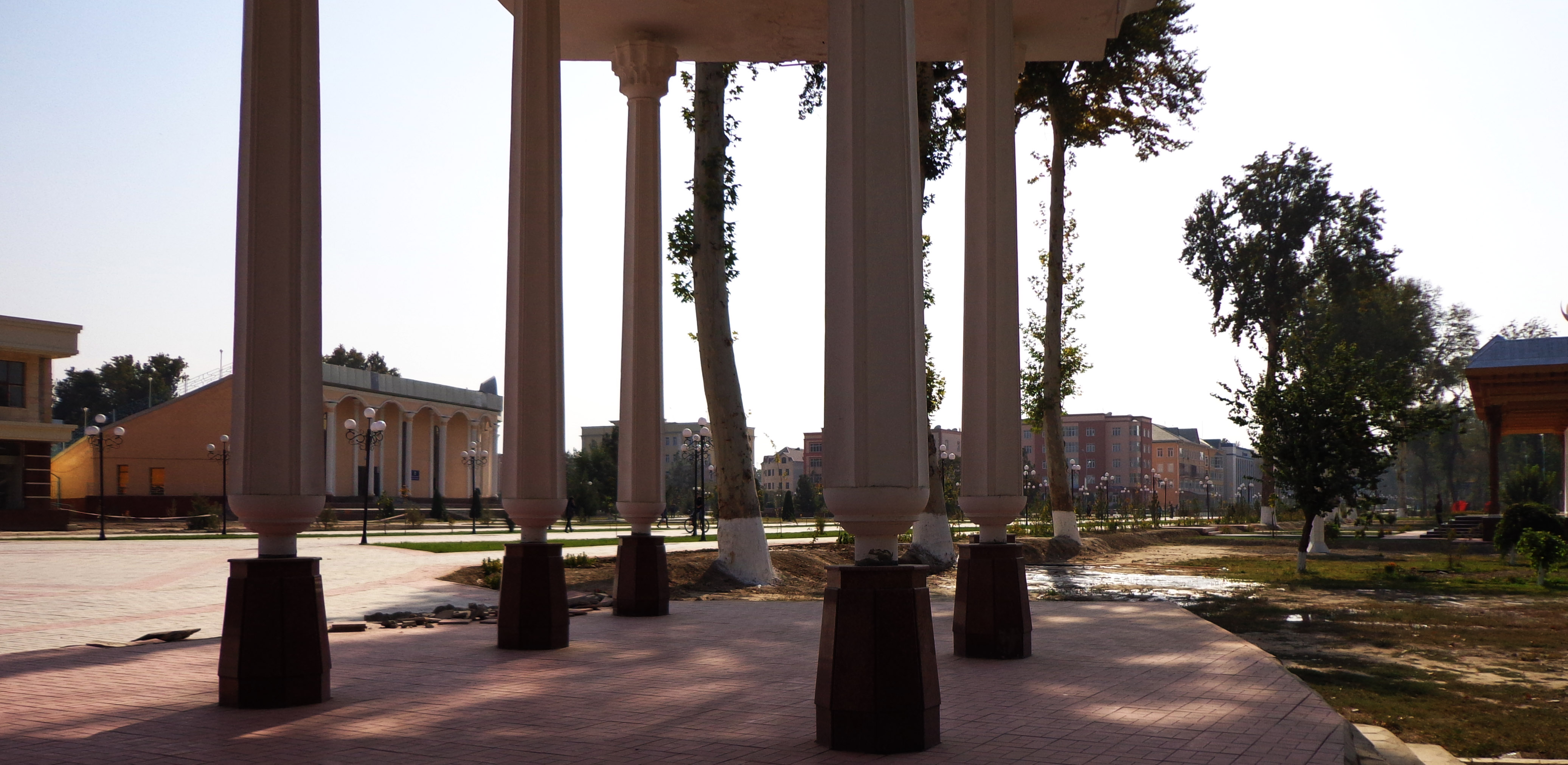
City center

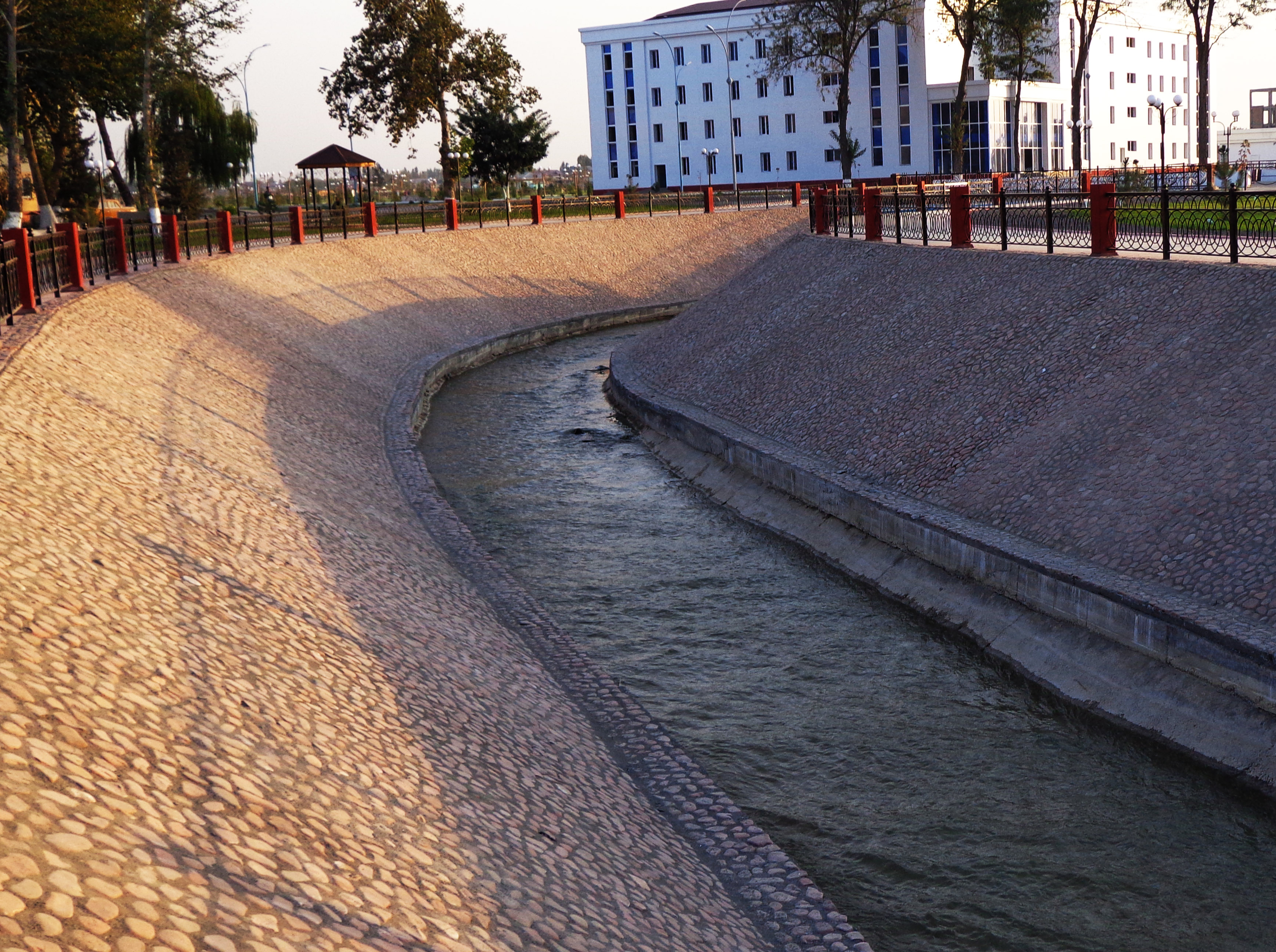
River

=== Main sights ===
- Museum of Local Studies — with displays of natural history, photographs, and local handicrafts
- Regional Theatre — in 1877 the house of General Mikhail “Old Bloody Eyes” Skobelev
- Fergana State University — built in 1902

== Notable people ==
- Shamshad Abdullaev — male Soviet and post-Soviet Uzbek author and poet
- Anastasiya Miroshnichenko — female artistic gymnast
- Xudoyberdi To'xtaboyev — male Soviet and post-Soviet Uzbek author
- Ziroat Mirziyoyeva — First Lady of Uzbekistan
- Peter Mikhailovich Kulakov — male Soviet and post-Soviet television evangelist for the Seventh-day Adventist Church
- Ida Mayrin — Uzbek-Israeli Olympic rhythmic gymnast
- Yadgar Nasriddinova — female Soviet Uzbek engineer and member of the Supreme Soviet of the Soviet Union
- Abdulla Qahhor — Soviet Uzbek writer
- Hamza Hakimzade Niyazi — Imperial Russian and Soviet poet and playwright
- Saida Mirziyoyeva — politician, eldest daughter of the President of Uzbekistan
- Furqat — poet in the Russian Empire exiled to Chinese Turkestan

== See also ==
- Babur
- Nurkhon Yuldashkhojayeva
- 1989 Fergana pogroms

== Sources ==
- Bosworth, C. Edmund (1999). "Farḡāna". Encyclopædia Iranica, online edition. New York.
