= Great Fergana Canal =

Irrigation canal between Uzbekistan and Tajikistan

Coordinates: 40°12′N 69°54′E

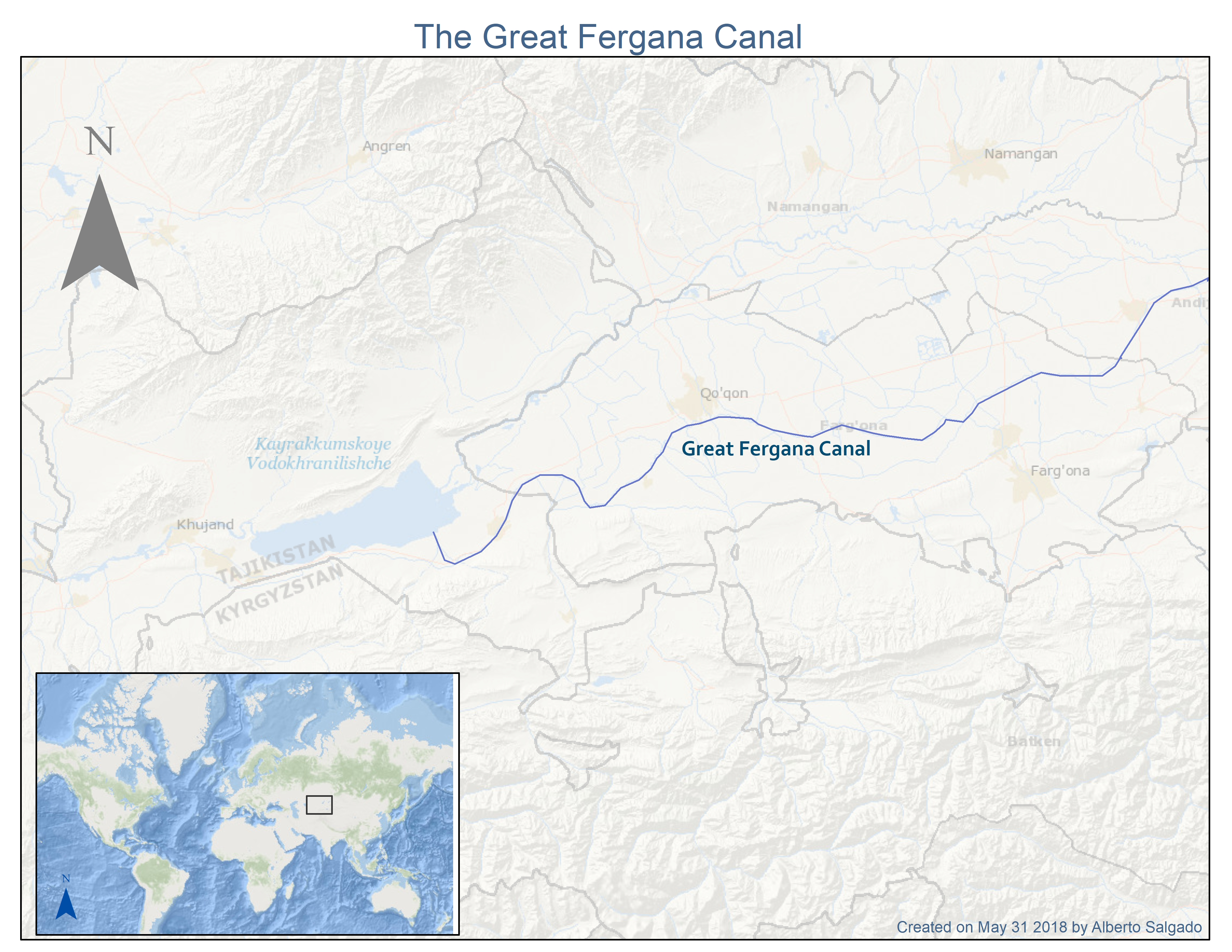
Great Fergana Canal map

The Great Fergana Canal (Russian: Ферганский канал, Tajik: Фарғона Канал, Uzbek: Fargʻona Kanali, Arabic: قناة فرغانة) is an irrigation canal located on the Fergana Valley between Uzbekistan and Tajikistan in Central Asia. The project was constructed in 1939 by 160,000 Uzbek and Tajik (mainly Uzbek) collective farm workers from the former Soviet Union and was completed in forty-five days. The canal is 270 kilometers long with over 1,000 hydrotechnical plants located along the waterway, 50 of which are known to be significantly important.

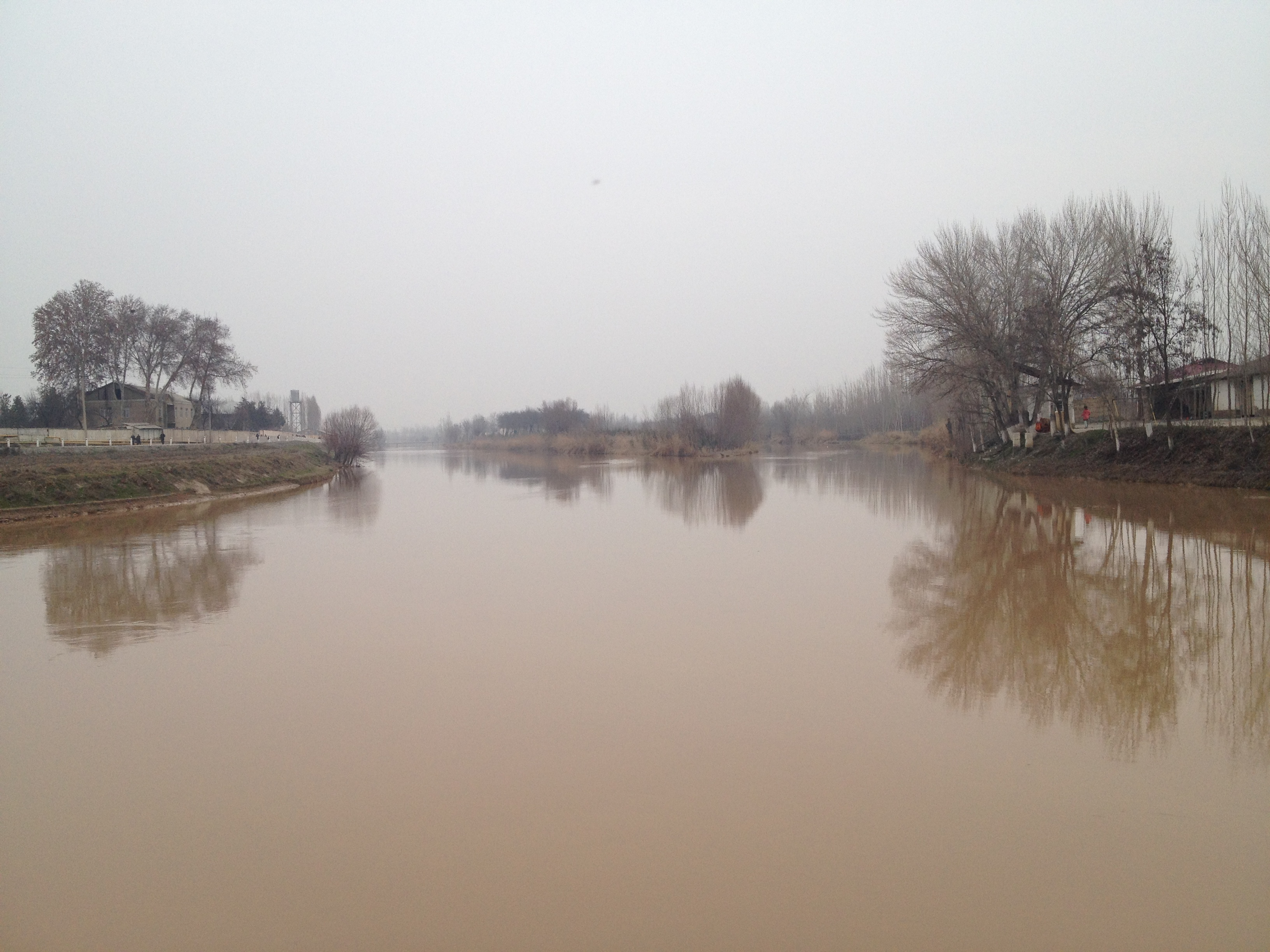
Great Fergana Canal near Andijan

== History ==
For many centuries prior to Soviet control of the region, water in Central Asia belonged to feudal-bey landlords.

On September 17, 1939, the Pravda Vostoka announced Central Asia's dream of obtaining water as a reality through the construction of the Great Fergana Canal. Usman Yusupov, the First Secretary of Central Asian Committee of the Communist Party of Uzbekistan, announced that Soviet villages would no longer have a hauz, where drinking water had worms, but would instead have more efficient drainage canals that would prosper the region. The Soviet government, along with the expansion of transportation infrastructure and Uzbek soviet citizens who invested in the region,transformed a once dry Russian colony into a lively flowering valley that would also serve as a center for Soviet life. The canal symbolized the progress of the union and announced the Soviet Union's future prosperity for the region.It also served as an example of care and guidance from the Stalinist state towards Central Asian citizens into modern age and socialism.

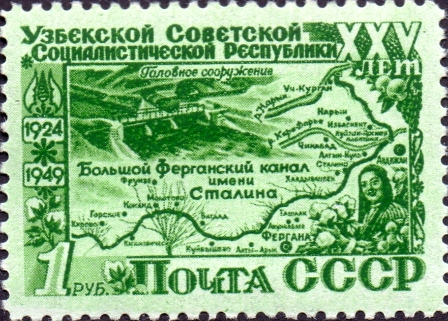
Route of the Great Fergana Canal on a 1950 stamp

A negative ecological change caused by the Great Fergana Canal was the desiccation of the Aral Sea as a result of poor water management and overuse.

== Uses ==
The main purpose for the canal was to irrigate the cotton fields of the Fergana Valley by the waters of Syr Darya River in efforts to establish agricultural independence from the western cotton market, and other crop yields also include vegetables and wheat.

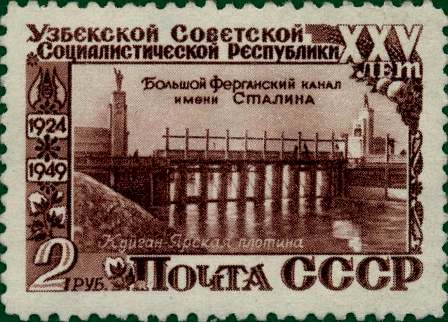
The Kuigan-Yar dam on a stamp

In 1940–41, the Northern and Southern Fergana canals were also constructed. As a result, the water supply to the irrigation systems of the valley increased considerably, as did the area irrigated, and the cotton harvest doubled. This irrigation project successfully resulted in massive crop production and led to population increase in the Central Asian region due to industrial settlement in the valley. The canal alone irrigates about 39 percent of the land in the Fergana Valley. As of 2008 the Southern Fergana Canal was undergoing technical and infrastructure repair from deterioration in efforts to conserve water from poor distribution and retention. The canal is expected to have automation that would enable computerized control of canal gates in addition to data acquisition and communication.

== In media ==
The construction of Fergana Canal was in the focus of many prominent representatives of the Photography in Uzbekistan such as Max Penson and other Soviet photographers like Mikhail Grachev.

Russian screenwriters Pyotr Pavlenko and Sergei Eisenstein wrote a script portraying the history and construction of the Fergana Canal. The script is written as a triptych and begins with an introduction of the violent sacking of Urgench during the 14th century, the second section portrays the riots and the struggle for water access in the valley, and ends with the construction of the canal.
