= Photography in Uzbekistan =

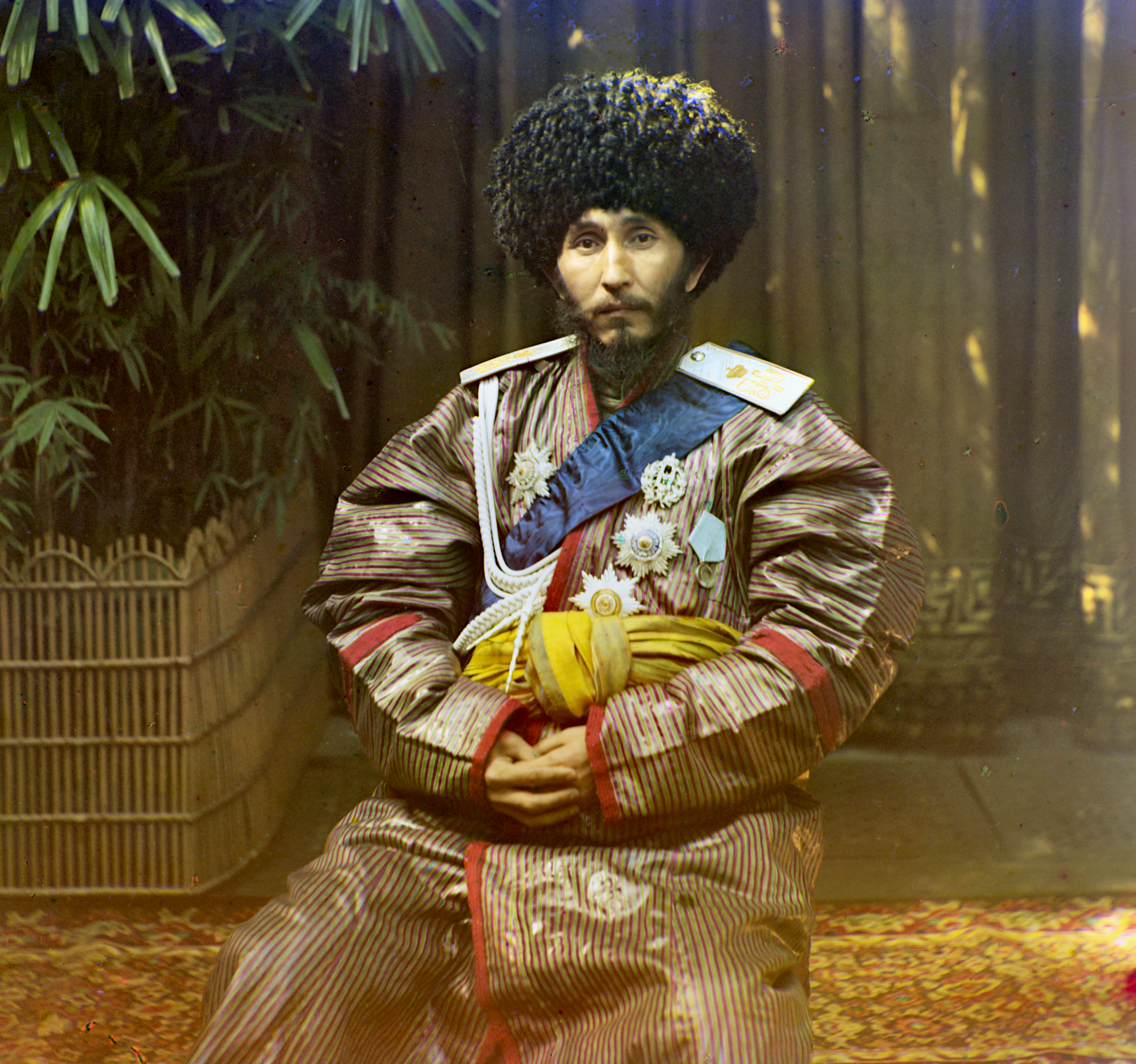
A Photograph of Isfandiyar Jurji Bahadur, Khan of Khiva, taken circa 1911.

Photography in Uzbekistan started developing after 1882, when a Volga German photographer and schoolteacher named Wilhelm Penner moved to Khiva as a part of the Russian Mennonite migration to Central Asia led by Claas Epp, Jr. After his arrival in the Khanate of Khiva, Penner shared his photography skills with a local student Khudaibergen Devanov, who later became the founder of Uzbek photography.

The first still photographs of Central Asia were shot by Russian photographer Anton Murenko, who came there with the Russian diplomatic mission in 1858.

The first color photographs of Central Asia belong to Sergey Prokudin-Gorsky, one of the founders of color photography.

Khudaibergen Devanov's photographs were unique in terms of demonstrating historically significant transition of Central Asian nations to the Soviet Union. Despite his pioneering in this newly introduced type of visual arts with his ethnographic and documentary photographs in the region, Khudaibergen Devanov was repressed by the Soviet regime and executed in 1940. Upon his arrest, big part of Devanov's archive was destroyed by the law enforcement agencies; however, his family succeeded in preserving a part of the archive. Some of Devanov's works are currently preserved in the Russian State Documentary Film and Photo Archive at Krasnogorsk.

In the Soviet period, many Uzbek photographers focused on documentary photography. One of the most prominent representatives of the Uzbek photography is Max Penson. Photojournalist Max Penson moved to Uzbekistan in 1915 and demonstrated historical, social, religious and political transformations that took place there under the Soviet influence by his photographs of unveiling and education of woman and children, construction of large-scale projects as Great Fergana Canal and many others. His photograph titled "Uzbek Madonna" received the Grand Prize at the 1937 Universal Exhibition in Paris.

In 1997, a building in the center of Tashkent city, which was constructed 1934 and had been used as the History Museum and the Art Exhibitions Directorate before, got the status of the Tashkent House of Photography. In 2005 Tashkent House of Photography was included in the Academy of Arts of Uzbekistan.

In 2009, photographer from Uzbekistan Umida Akhmedova, whose images have been published in the photography sections of the online editions of The New York Times, Wall Street Journal and The Globe and Mail, was officially accused of "defamation, insult and slander" of the Uzbek nation. Akhmedova's photo-album "Women and Men: From Dawn to Dusk" and a documentary film "The Burden of Virginity" were used as evidences against the photographer during the trial. She was found guilty and though the charges carried a prison sentence of up to three years, they were waived as saying that Akhmedova had been granted an amnesty in honor of the 18th anniversary of Uzbek independence.

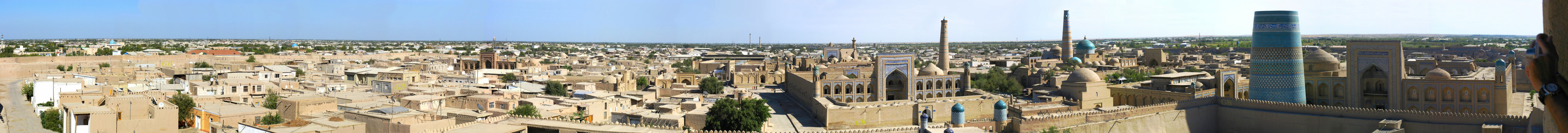
Panorama view of the city of Khiva, Uzbekistan, 2010.
