= Mikhail P. Kulakov =

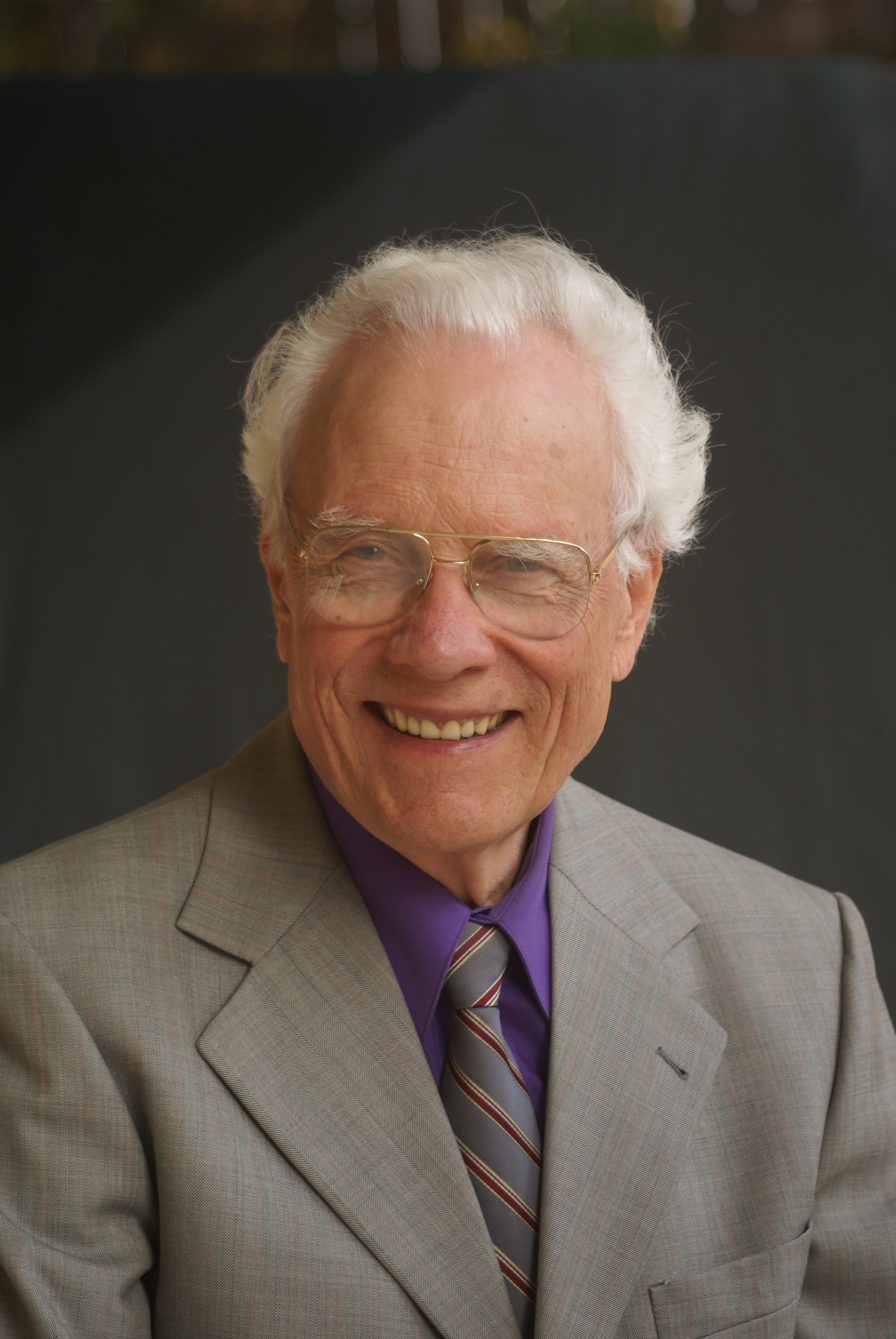
- Native name: Михаил Кулаков

Personal details
- Born: March 29, 1927 Leningrad, Russia
- Died: February 10, 2010 (aged 82) Highland, California, US
- Occupation: pastor, religious freedom advocate, biblical scholar and translator

Mikhail Petrovich Kulakov (Russian: Михаил Петрович Кулаков; March 29, 1927 – February 10, 2010) was a Russian Seventh-day Adventist pastor, religious freedom advocate, biblical scholar and translator. He became the first president of the church's Euro-Asia Division in 1990.

Kulakov was imprisoned and exiled in the Soviet Union for his religious activities. He later worked to unite Adventist congregations and strengthen their ties with the worldwide church. His efforts to secure a recognized church organization through cooperation with the Soviet authorities met opposition from some Adventists. He helped establish Zaoksky Theological Seminary, which opened in 1988, and was one of the founders of the Adventist publishing house Source of Life.

In 1990, he participated in the Supreme Soviet's debate on the draft law on freedom of conscience and religious organizations, arguing that religious institutions should be allowed to offer a full school curriculum. In 1992, he founded the Russian chapter of the International Religious Liberty Association and served as its secretary general. He was listed as the association's representative at Russia's 1993 Constitutional Conference.

In the early 1990s, Kulakov founded the Institute for Bible Translation in Zaoksky, in Russia's Tula Region, and initiated and directed a collective project to translate the Bible into modern Russian. The project's New Testament translation was published in 2000. After his death, his son Mikhail Mikhailovich Kulakov took over the leadership of the project. The complete translation was published under his son's direction in 2015.

== Early life ==
=== Family, education and early ministry ===
Kulakov was born in 1927 in Leningrad (St. Petersburg), the son of a Seventh-day Adventist pastor. In 1928, his family moved to Tula in central Russia when his father, Peter Stepanovich Kulakov, was sent there to serve as a pastor. The Kulakov family was under scrutiny from the Soviet state security authorities. In conversations recorded by Olga Suvorova, Kulakov recalled his father's arrest in 1935 and exile in Siberia, where his mother and the younger children joined him. The family lived in the village of Krasnyi Klyuch in the Krasnoyarsk Region until 1939. After the exile ended, the family moved to Samara and then to Maykop (Adygea, Russia). Kulakov recalled that they relocated to Ivanovo shortly before the German invasion of the Soviet Union in 1941. In Ivanovo, Kulakov enrolled at Ivanovo Art School and graduated in 1947.

In August 1945, Kulakov was baptized into the Seventh-day Adventist Church. In his memoir Though the Heavens Fall, he recalled that his father had baptized him at the age of 18 in a secret nighttime ceremony, away from the city lights, together with seven other people. Following his baptism, he began helping his father conduct clandestine worship services and carry out missionary work.

According to his recollections, his father was arrested again after the war and sentenced to ten years' imprisonment. Writing in Liberty in 1994, Kulakov recalled that, while his father was under investigation, the security authorities had repeatedly questioned him at night about people attending worship services. He said that he had refused to provide information.

Kulakov recalled moving to Daugavpils, Latvia, before his mother and brother joined him. In Daugavpils, Kulakov continued his church work and taught drawing and drafting at a local school.

=== Imprisonment and exile ===
In March 1948, Soviet state security officers arrested Kulakov and his elder brother Stephen. After six months in prison in Ivanovo, Kulakov was sentenced to five years in Soviet forced labor camps. According to his recollections, he served his five-year term (1948–1953) first in Mordovia and then in Karlag, near Karaganda in Kazakhstan. He learned German while imprisoned.

He recalled that Stephen served his term near Vorkuta and died in exile after his release from the camps. In a 1990 interview with The Indianapolis News, he said that he had considered himself a happy man despite the hardships of imprisonment, and that fellow prisoners had seen him in the same way.

After completing his sentence in 1953, Kulakov was sent into permanent exile in the Kazakh village of Myrzykul, in the Kustanai region. According to his recollections, he later obtained permission to settle in Semiozernoye, where he taught drawing and drafting at a school and met his future wife. During his exile, he married Anna (née Velgosha). He was released from exile under an amnesty. In 1955, he and his young family moved to Alma-Ata, the former capital of Kazakhstan. There, the family became active in the ministry of the Seventh-day Adventist Church despite severe persecution.

Kulakov had six children.

== Church leadership and unification efforts ==
=== Early leadership and international contacts ===
In 1958, Kulakov was ordained as a minister and elected head of the unofficial Seventh-day Adventist organization operating in Central Asia, Kazakhstan and the South Caucasus. He held this position until 1975.

During the 1960s, Kulakov coordinated the work of unregistered Adventist congregations in Soviet Central Asia and faced repeated harassment from the KGB and local authorities. His family moved from Almaty to the village of Akkul’ (Dzhambul region) in 1960, then to Kokand in 1962 and Chimkent in 1966.

Historian Alexander Kashirin describes Kulakov as a principal intermediary between the General Conference of the Seventh-day Adventist Church, the Soviet Council for Religious Affairs and Soviet Adventist leaders who supported his approach to church unity. Contacts with the worldwide church were constrained by state restrictions. Kulakov was invited to the General Conference session in 1970; that year, he received permission to travel to the United States on a private visit to an aunt in San Francisco, California. During his visit, he attended the General Conference's Annual Council and met its president, Robert H. Pierson, who offered support for his efforts to unite Soviet Adventists and present them as law-abiding citizens.

After returning to the Soviet Union, Kulakov worked with colleagues in the Central Asian republics, the Baltic republics, Belarus, Ukraine and Moldova on efforts to consolidate Adventist communities. According to Kashirin, cooperation with the authorities was intended to secure permission for a central church organization that could develop theological education, publish religious literature and maintain regular contacts with Adventists abroad. This approach encountered opposition within the church. Kashirin notes that some Adventists objected to Kulakov's criticism of underground religious activity, arguing that congregations denied registration should not be blamed for operating without it.

In 1975, Kulakov attended the General Conference session in Vienna, Austria. He was elected to the Executive Committee of the General Conference and became a member of the Academy of Adventist Ministers.

=== Leadership in the RSFSR and the Euro-Asia Division ===
In 1975, the Adventist congregation in Tula petitioned the Council for Religious Affairs to establish the position of senior presbyter for the RSFSR and proposed Kulakov for the post. That year, he moved from Kazakhstan to Tula at the invitation of fellow Adventists, as he recalled in a 1992 interview with the newspaper Kommunar.

In 1977, at a meeting of Adventist ministers in Gorky held with government permission, Kulakov was elected senior presbyter of the Adventist Church in the RSFSR. The participants were mainly supporters of his initiative and of the former All-Union Council of Seventh-day Adventists. In a statement circulated in 1980, opponents challenged the authority of the new organization, arguing that many ministers had not participated in Kulakov's election.

At the General Conference's Annual Council on October 7, 1981, Neal C. Wilson reported on a recent visit to the Soviet Union, during which he had urged Adventist leaders to work towards organizational unity. Kulakov and Nikolai A. Zhukalyuk also addressed the council, conveying greetings from Soviet Adventists and expressing confidence that organizational unity would be achieved in the near future.

According to Kashirin, by the mid-1980s the organization led by Kulakov in Tula had brought together most of the congregations previously aligned with rival groups or remaining outside them. In 1985, a temporary Adventist coordinating council was formed in the Soviet Union. Kulakov (from the RSFSR) and Nikolai A. Zhukalyuk (from Ukraine) were elected coordinators. They worked closely with church leaders in other Soviet republics to reunite and organize national and local Adventist associations in accordance with the worldwide church's Working Policy, as far as circumstances allowed.

In 1988, Kulakov was chairman of the Seventh-day Adventist Church's Republican Council in the RSFSR. On April 30, 1988, the Los Angeles Times reported that Kulakov was due to receive an honorary doctorate from Southwestern Adventist College in Texas that day.

In July 1990, Kulakov was elected president of the newly formed Euro-Asia Division of the world Adventist Church at the General Conference session in Indianapolis. He remained president until 1992.

Writing about the Adventist Church in Russia, Oleg Morozov credited Kulakov with helping to unite scattered congregations, train new ministers and reconnect Soviet Adventists with the worldwide church. Kashirin likewise emphasizes Kulakov's role in expanding international contacts and educational opportunities, while noting the political compromises that cooperation with the Soviet state entailed.

== Seminary and publishing house ==
The Soviet government granted permission to establish an Adventist seminary in Zaoksky on January 27, 1987.

The Kulakov family moved to the village of Zaoksky in 1988. That year, Kulakov opened Zaoksky Theological Seminary, described by A. S. Kashkin as Russia's first institution for training Adventist pastors. His son, Mikhail Mikhailovich Kulakov, worked with him to establish and develop the seminary and was its rector by 1992. They had obtained the necessary permissions after negotiating with the authorities.

From 1988, Kulakov taught pastoral theology and homiletics at the seminary, combining teaching with administrative duties. He also edited the church newspaper Slovo primireniya ('Word of Reconciliation').

In a 1992 interview with Kommunar, Kulakov recalled that volunteers from Adventist churches across the Soviet Union had completed the main construction work in six months. Many had used their annual leave to work on the complex without pay.

The journalist N. Efimova, who visited the complex for the interview, described the seminary as having been built on the site of an abandoned school. A library and printing facility were still under construction, and an experimental farm demonstrated agricultural techniques to local residents. Efimova also reported on Kulakov's plan to move the church's administrative center to Moscow while retaining Zaoksky as a center for ministerial training.

In April 1988, the Los Angeles Times reported that a joint Soviet–Adventist printing venture remained under negotiation.

Kulakov was one of the founders of Source of Life, the USSR's first Seventh-day Adventist publishing house.

== Public activities ==
=== Peace conferences and social initiatives ===
In the 1970s and 1980s, Kulakov represented the Seventh-day Adventist Church at public events and international peace conferences in the Soviet Union and abroad. In June 1977, he participated in the World Conference "Religious Leaders for Lasting Peace, Disarmament and Just Relations Among Nations". In 1982, he was invited to take part in the World Conference "Religious Workers for Saving the Sacred Gift of Life from Nuclear Catastrophe" in Moscow. Kulakov also took part in numerous other Christian peace conferences abroad.

From June 22 to 27, 1978, he traveled to Prague with a delegation of ministers from various religious bodies in the Soviet Union to attend the conference of the Christian Peace Movement. From April 20 to 24, 1983, Kulakov participated in the "For Life and Peace" conference in Uppsala, Sweden. In the mid-1980s, he traveled to Japan twice to participate in peace conferences organized by Japanese religious organizations.

As relations between the Soviet Union and the United States improved in the late 1980s, public diplomacy gained prominence as a means of easing international tensions. This created opportunities for meetings with Soviet public figures. Kulakov was invited to attend the International Chautauqua Conference on US-Soviet Relations, held in Chautauqua, New York, from August 24 to 28, 1987.

On September 2, 1987, Kulakov accompanied Konstantin Kharchev, chairman of the Soviet Council for Religious Affairs, on a visit to the Adventist Media Center in Newbury Park, California. He acted as an interpreter when Kharchev addressed the center's employees about changes in Soviet religious policy.

Kulakov joined the governing board of the Soviet Children's Fund in the fall of 1987. The fund's chairman was the Russian writer Albert Likhanov. Writing in Moskovskiye Novosti in January 1988, he called for cooperation between believers and nonbelievers in social welfare activities and proposed a joint venture with Adventists abroad to produce food for children.

=== Freedom of conscience and Soviet legislation ===
In December 1988, Kulakov contributed to a discussion of religious legislation in the journal Nauka i religia. He argued that freedom of conscience included the right to share religious beliefs openly and criticized the Russian translation of Article 18 of the Universal Declaration of Human Rights for failing to convey fully the right to express, teach and practice one's religion. Michael Bourdeaux described his contribution as more focused on the discriminatory effects of the existing law than on proposals for change.

In July 1989, Kulakov accompanied Kharchev to a conference organized by the International Religious Liberty Association (IRLA) in London. According to Jane Ellis, Kulakov told the conference that he was no longer ashamed to identify himself publicly as a believer in the Soviet Union and now felt respected as one.

According to Kulakov's recollections, cited by the historian Alexander Kashirin, he and his son Mikhail Mikhailovich sought permission from Soviet interior minister Vadim Bakatin in 1989 to begin a prison ministry. Kulakov recalled that, the following week, Adventist congregations received permission to visit prisoners.

In July 1990, Kulakov argued in Vecherniy Chelyabinsk that a law on freedom of conscience should protect both believers and nonbelievers. He advocated universal ethical principles but accepted legislation extending believers' rights as a necessary transitional step.

On September 26, 1990, Kulakov took part in the Supreme Soviet's debate on the draft law on freedom of conscience and religious organizations. He was among the religious leaders invited to participate, alongside Baptist leader Grigory Komendant and Adolf Shayevich, chief rabbi of the Moscow Choral Synagogue. Patriarch Alexy II was also present. The draft received initial approval that day. Kulakov welcomed it as the outcome of suffering endured by believers. He criticized the draft's retention of the state's monopoly on education and proposed allowing religious institutions to offer a full school curriculum.

An April 1991 profile in The Herald-Palladium reported that Kulakov had met Soviet president Mikhail Gorbachev and heard him express regret for past religious persecution. During an interview at Andrews University, Kulakov expressed optimism that religious freedom in the Soviet Union would continue to expand, while cautioning that democratization was unpredictable and its gains were not guaranteed.

=== Religious organizations and public advocacy ===
In the early 1990s, Kulakov helped establish the Russian Bible Society, along with the priest Alexander Borisov. He was an honorary member of its board.

In 1992, Kulakov founded the Russian chapter of IRLA. He served as its secretary general. The official list of participants in Russia's 1993 Constitutional Conference includes him as an IRLA representative with the title of secretary general.

In an article published in Vechernyaya Moskva in October 1993, Kulakov opposed restrictions on foreign religious preachers and argued that the protection of national culture could not justify restrictions on freedom of conscience.

In March 1994, again writing in Vechernyaya Moskva, Kulakov defended the constitutional separation of religious associations from the state and their equality before the law. He opposed special legal privileges for any ideology or religion and called on state authorities to avoid favoring particular denominations.

In June 2008, Kulakov received a Lifetime Achievement Award at the annual Religious Liberty Dinner in Washington, D.C.

== Bible translation ==
=== Translation work and publications ===
Kulakov stepped down from church leadership to devote himself to translating the Bible into modern Russian. In the early 1990s, he initiated the translation project and established the Institute for Bible Translation in Zaoksky. He directed a team of translators whose work was intended for readers across denominations. The contributors included philologists and biblical scholars, among them Andrei Desnitsky.

For a time, Kulakov combined work on the translation with teaching homiletics at Zaoksky Theological Seminary. He later gave up other activities to complete the translation of the New Testament.

The New Testament translation was published in 2000 by the Dialog educational foundation, with Kulakov as editor and author of the preface. It was presented on June 1 at the All-Russia State Library for Foreign Literature in Moscow. Kulakov sought to convey the meaning of the original rather than reproduce its form, while providing literal renderings in footnotes.

At the presentation, the priest Georgy Chistyakov described the translation as the product of sustained reflection on Scripture and of Kulakov's experience as a Christian. Mikhail Seleznyov, chief editor of the Russian Bible Society, noted that it followed different principles from the society's translation, but praised the care taken in its preparation and the inclusion of commentary.

At the 2000 General Conference session in Toronto, Kulakov presented the translation to the delegates. It was decided that he should continue work on the remaining books of the Bible.

Kulakov moved to the United States in 2000 and continued to direct the Institute for Bible Translation remotely. His wife also settled there. He was still serving as the institute's director in 2008.

In August 2001, Andrews University awarded Kulakov an honorary doctorate in theology for his contribution to the translation of the Scriptures.

An edition of the New Testament with Psalms appeared in 2002, and a translation of the Five Books of Moses was published in 2010. Other publications included the books of Daniel and the Minor Prophets.

=== Posthumous completion and reception ===
After Kulakov's death in 2010, his son Mikhail Mikhailovich Kulakov took over the leadership of the project. The translation was completed under Mikhail M. Kulakov's direction, and the full Bible was published in 2015.

Reviewing the 2021 edition in 2023, A. S. Kashkin welcomed its publication, praised its readability and recommended it as an aid for biblical scholars and theologians, while advising Orthodox lay readers to use traditional church translations. He criticized the extensive use of explanatory additions, arguing that they sometimes restricted the possible meanings of the biblical text. He found little influence from Adventist doctrine overall, but criticized the rendering of 1 Peter 4:6 for reflecting that doctrine, noting that the accompanying footnote also provided a literal reading.

== Final years and death ==
During his final years in California, Kulakov continued his work on the Bible translation, corresponding by email with the institute's staff in Russia and returning to Russia for meetings. In July 2007, Olga Suvorova interviewed him in Zaoksky about his life and religious views; these conversations were subsequently included in her book My tolko stoim na beregu… (We Are Only Standing on the Shore…).

His memoirs, Though the Heavens Fall, written with Maylan Schurch, were published by the Review and Herald Publishing Association in 2008.

Suvorova recalled that, during a conversation in November 2009, Kulakov's son Peter said that his father had been diagnosed with brain cancer. He received treatment at Loma Linda University Medical Center. According to his obituary in Blagovest-Info, he continued working on the Bible translation until the final days of his life.

He died of brain cancer on February 10, 2010, at his home in Highland, California, aged 82. He was survived by his wife Anna, their six children, fifteen grandchildren and four great-grandchildren.

Adventist News Network reported, citing his son Peter, that the Pentateuch translation was printed on the day of Kulakov's death. An obituary in Nezavisimaya Gazeta reported that newly printed copies were delivered to the institute in Zaoksky that day.

Bobbitt Memorial Chapel announced that his funeral services and burial would take place in Washington, D.C.

== Sources ==
- Bourdeaux, Michael (1990). Gorbachev, Glasnost and the Gospel. London: Hodder & Stoughton. ISBN 0-340-51739-5.
- Chapnin, Sergei (2025). "Russian Federation". In Ross, Kenneth R.; Simion, Marian Gh.; Johnson, Todd M. (eds.). Christianity in Eastern and Southern Europe. Edinburgh: Edinburgh University Press. pp. 243–262. ISBN 978-1-3995-4774-1.
- Ellis, Jane (2005). "Some reflections about religious policy under Kharchev". In Ramet, Sabrina Petra (ed.). Religious Policy in the Soviet Union. Cambridge: Cambridge University Press. pp. 84–104. doi:10.1017/CBO9780511598272.005. ISBN 978-0-521-02230-9.
- Kashirin, Alexander (2010). Protestant Minorities in the Soviet Ukraine, 1945–1991 (PhD thesis). University of Oregon. hdl:1794/10956.
- Kashkin, A. S. (2023). "Библия. Книги Священного Писания Ветхого и Нового Завета в современном русском переводе / под ред. М. П. Кулакова, М. М. Кулакова" [Review of the Bible in a modern Russian translation, edited by M. P. Kulakov and M. M. Kulakov]. Библия и христианская древность (in Russian) (2 (18)): 287–298. doi:10.31802/BCA.2023.2.18.009.
- Kulakov, Mikhail P. (2008). Though the Heavens Fall. With Maylan Schurch. Hagerstown, Maryland: Review and Herald Publishing Association. ISBN 978-0-8280-2366-5. Publisher's excerpt (PDF).
- Lovelace, Christopher J. (2022). "Book Review (Extended): A Guide to Bible Translation: People, Languages, and Topics". Conspectus. 33 (1): 120–137. doi:10.54725/conspectus.2022.1.9.
- Morozov, Oleg (November 2011). "«…Проповедовать лето Господне благоприятное»: миссия Церкви христиан адвентистов седьмого дня в России" [The mission of the Seventh-day Adventist Church in Russia]. Русское ревью (in Russian) (53). Keston Institute. Archived from the original on December 8, 2024.
- Suvorova, Olga (2012). Мы только стоим на берегу… [We Are Only Standing on the Shore…] (in Russian). Moscow: Eksmo. ISBN 978-5-699-56364-7.
