= Galeyev Gallery =

Coordinates: 55.7621°N 37.5946°E

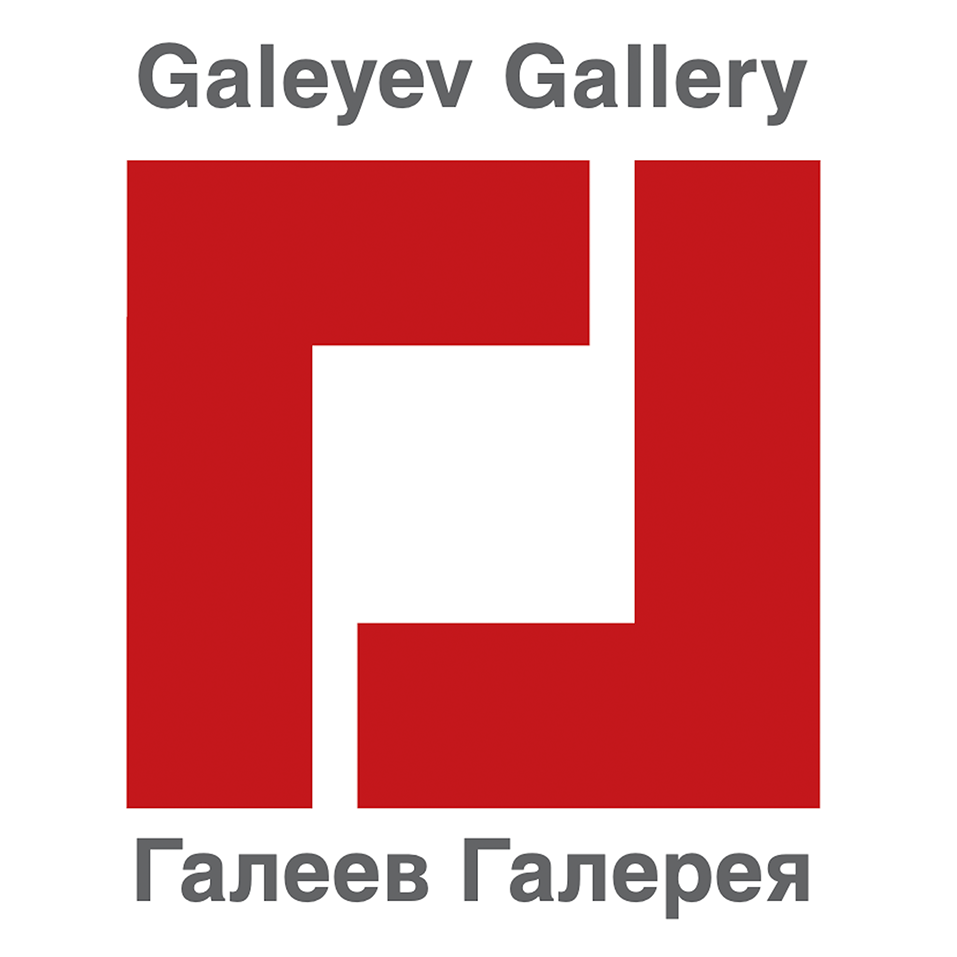
- Established: May 2006
- Location: Bol'shoy Kozikhinskiy Pereulok, 19/6, Moscow, Russia, 123001
- Type: Art Gallery
- Curator: Ildar Galeyev
- Website: www.ggallery.ru/en

Galeyev Gallery (also known as Galeev Gallery; in Russian: Галеев Галерея) is a Russian art gallery in Moscow, Russia. The owner and curator, Ildar Galeyev, a distinguished art historian, curator, publisher, and art critic, actively curates exhibitions on pre-war Russian art (1910s to 1940s).

== History ==
Galeyev Gallery was opened in May 2006 in Bolshoi Kozikhinski Pereulok, 19/6, a prestigious area of cultural and historical significance in central Moscow, the Patriarch Ponds.

The gallery's noble mission is to preserve and exhibitunderstudied works of Russian avant-garde and Russian Pre-War (1910-1940) art, mainly from private collections. Ildar Galeyev, an art historian, curator, publisher, and art criticart critic, is dedicated to curatorial practices that encourage the preservation and exhibition of the lesser-known artists of Russian Pre-War art. Galeev prioritizes the focus on analyzing and eliminating biographical and artistic misattributions and inaccuracies and preserving artistic legacy by making exhibitions accessible to a broader audience.

=== Selected Exhibitions ===
Galeyev Gallery has hosted a number of temporary exhibitions:

- Max Penson: Photography (2006)
- Nikolay Tyrsa (2007)
- Two Centuries of the Russian Graphics (2009)
- TASS Photography: The Chronicles of the Kruschev's Thaw (1955-1963) (2009)
- Chingiz Akhmarov (2010)
- Robert Falk (2012)
- Alisa Poret (2013)
- The School of Petrov-Vodkin (2015)
- Behind the Facade of am Era (in collaboration with the Shchusev Museum of Architecture) (2021)
- Olga Hildebrant-Areeva: Psyche of the Northern Palmyra (2022)
- Konstantin Kudryashev: Graphic Works at Small and at Large (2023)
- Moisey Sinyaver: From the Ruins to the Social Housing (2024)
- Alexander Vvedensky (2024)
