= Umida Akhmedova =

Uzbeki photographer

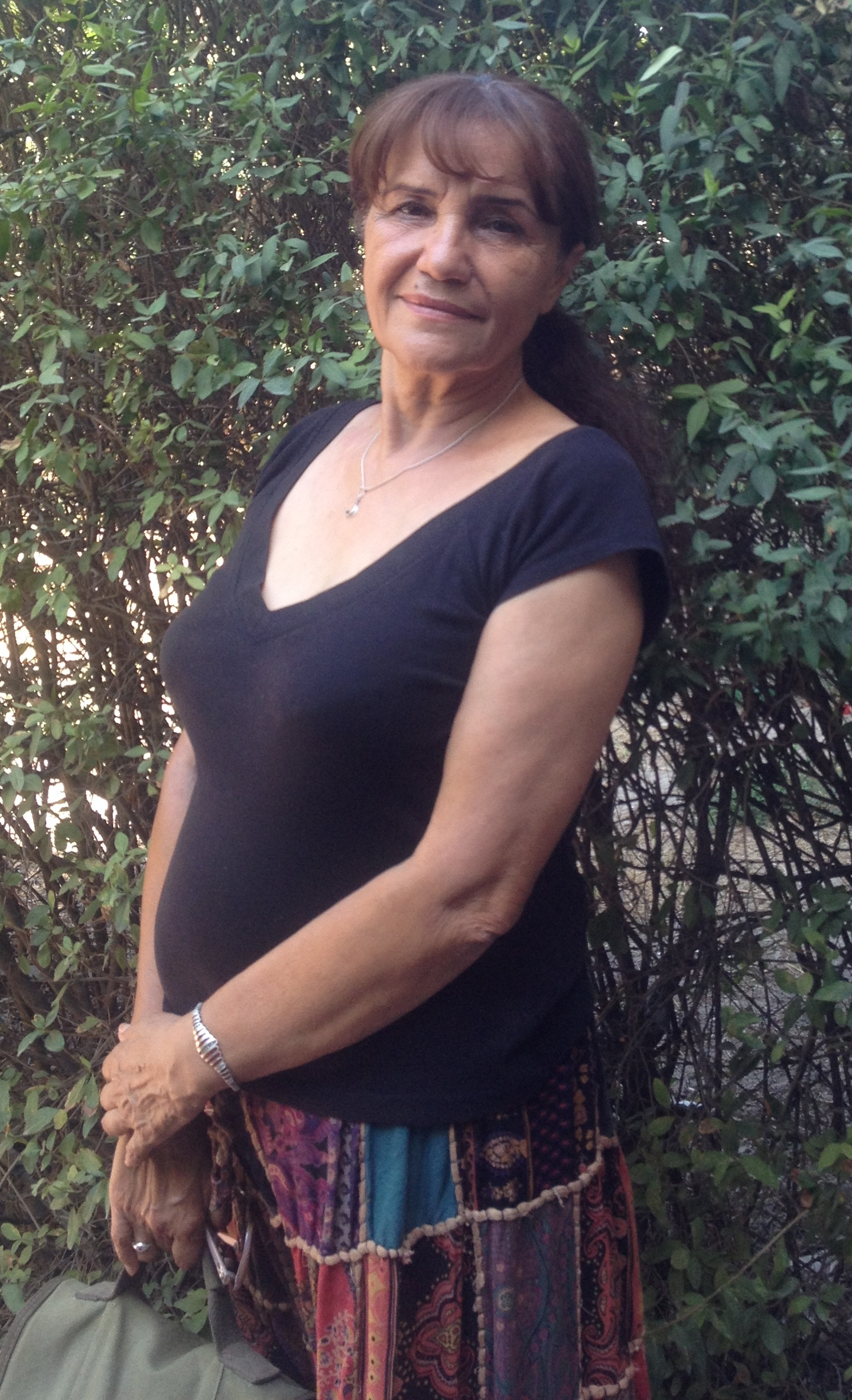
Umida Akhmedova in 2016

Umida (from Persian Omideh) Tukhtamuradovna Akhmedova, also known as Umida Ahmedova, (Умида Тухтамурадовна Ахмедова, born October 21, 1955, in Parkent, Uzbekistan) is a photographer and photojournalist working and living in Central Asia. She currently resides in Uzbekistan and is married to filmmaker Oleg Karpov. In 2010 she was convicted of "slander of the Uzbek nation" after making a documentary. Since 2010, she can not participate in any official exhibitions in Uzbekistan.

== Work ==
As a photographer she has participated in exhibitions addressing urban and rural issues and has collaborated on film and book projects including the presentation of the short film The Burden of Virginity. As an Associated Press photographer, her images have been published in the photography sections of the online editions of The New York Times, the Wall Street Journal and The Globe and Mail. As a photojournalist and artist she has worked onprojects dedicated to exploring issues of human rights. In the course of her work she has documented the traditions, disparate cultures and everyday events in the modern borders of Uzbekistan.

Umida Akhmedova is one of the most prominent representatives of the Uzbek photography.

== Arrest and criminal charges ==
On November 17, 2009, she was summoned by Nodir Akhmadzhan, investigator of the Tashkent city police department and accused of defamation and of "insult and slander of the Uzbek nation." These charges against her and others are due in part to participation on a project sponsored by the Swiss Embassy Gender Program. One of the works, Women and men: from dawn till dusk documents aspects of life in rural Uzbekistan. On December 16, 2009, criminal charges were filed against her due to her involvement in the aforementioned project as well as other gender and human rights media projects including The Burden of Virginity, about difficulties faced by women in Uzbekistan. The criminal charges carry a possible sentence of prison for up to six months, or 2–3 years of forced labor and she is currently banned from leaving the country.

In January 2010 she was accused of slander, allegedly "insulting the Uzbek people" after she produced her book portraying rural Uzbekistan and Uzbek traditions. She was charged on January 13, after an expert panel of 'specialists in the fields of religious affairs, spirituality, and psychology' found that her images portrayed Uzbekistan in a negative light to Western audiences: "a foreigner who has never been to Uzbekistan, but who is familiar with this album, would reach the conclusion that [Uzbekistan] is a country where people live in the Middle Ages".

In February 2010 she was found guilty of slandering and insulting the Uzbek people, but could walk away free. Though the charges carried a prison sentence of up to three years imprisonment, the judge waived a penalty saying that the convict was granted an amnesty in honor of the 18th anniversary of Uzbek independence. She said she intended to appeal the conviction.

"Portsmouth University Pugwash" columnist Mark Norman commented that, "Umida Akhmedova is an Uzbek photographer who, in 2007, produced an album of images of the everyday lives of the people of Uzbekistan. The album, titled "Men and Women: Dawn to Dusk", contains more than 100 images of Uzbek traditions and customs. The images, which are of simple and everyday scenes, have been severely lambasted by the Uzbek authorities, who have claimed the images portray the people of Uzbekistan as "backward". The government authorities have since charged Akhmedova with "slander" and "insult" against her own nation. The news of Umida Akhmedova's case spread around the world like wildfire, being picked up by many international news providers along the way.

== See also ==
- Human rights in Uzbekistan
