= Peter Mikhailovich Kulakov =

- Петр Михайлович Кулаков
- Born: 21 March 1964 (age 62); Kokand, Uzbek SSR, Soviet Union
- Occupations: Television evangelist, pastor
- Spouse: Galena Kulakov
- Parent(s): Mikhail Kulakov; Anna Kulakov
- Website: www.lohtv.com

Peter Mikhailovich Kulakov (born 21 March 1964) is a television evangelist, founding director of the first Christian Media Center in the post-Soviet states, pastor, and overseas missionary. He was born in Kokand, Uzbek Soviet Socialist Republic (now Uzbekistan), and raised in central Russia. He is a Seventh-day Adventist.

In 1990, at the age of 26, Kulakov was the first Christian to appear live regularly on two national communist radio networks, blanketing 11 time zones with 900 FM stations. Moscow State University research showed the Voice of Hope radio program as the most popular among all the other religious broadcasts.

In 1992 he appeared at the Grand Kremlin Palace of Culture for 12 days as a Russian translator for American Evangelist Mark Finley, as well as in the Moscow Olympic Stadium in 1993.
In 2005 Peter Kulakov started a weekly Light of Hope television program in two languages, Russian and English. The Russian Light of Hope program is broadcast on the CNL evangelical satellite network, as well as on the Hope Europe satellite channel. The English program is aired weekly on Comcast channel 5 in Metro Atlanta. In 2007 and in 2010 Kulakov presented two major satellite evangelistic series of meetings live from Kyiv, Ukraine and Chișinău, Moldova.

Peter currently serves as the Assistant to the President for Evangelism (https://www.gccsda.com/evangelism) in the Georgia-Cumberland Conference of Seventh-day Adventist. Prior to this role, Peter served as Senior Pastor at the Ooltewah (TN) Seventh-day Adventist Church and the Lakeview (GA) Seventh-day Adventist Church.

== Biography ==
Kulakov was born in Kokand, Uzbekistan. He was the fifth out of six children born to Anna and Mikhail Kulakov, prisoner of conscience and gulag survivor.
