= Max Penson =

- Born: 1893; Velizh, Vitebsk Governorate, Russian Empire (present-day Smolensk Oblast, Russia)
- Died: 1959 (aged 65–66); Tashkent, Uzbek Soviet Socialist Republic (present-day Tashkent, Uzbekistan)
- Occupations: Photojournalist, photographer, artist
- Website: maxpenson.com

Max Zakharovich Penson (Russian: Макс Захарович Пенсон; 1893–1959) was a Russian-Jewish photojournalist and photographer of the Soviet Union noted for his photographs of Uzbekistan. Max Penson is one of the most prominent representatives of Uzbek and Soviet-era photography, especially Russian avant-garde, revered by prominent figures like Sergei Eisenstein. Penson's works have been featured in exhibitions across the globe, sponsored by the likes of Roman Abramovich and New York's MoMA.

== Biography ==
Penson was born into a poor bookbinder's Jewish family in 1893 in the small town of Velizh in Vitebsk Governorate (present-day Smolensk Oblast, Russia). He soon moved to Vilno where he enrolled in the art school of S. N. Yuzhanin. In 1914, he was forced as a Jew to move with his family to Kokand in Turkestan.

After the 1917 Russian Revolution he founded an art school in Kokand under administration of the Kokand Revolutionary Committee. He became the director and taught draftsmanship to 350 Uzbek children studying at the school. In 1921 his life changed dramatically when he obtained a camera. He would go on to become one of Uzbekistan's and indeed the Soviet Union's prominent professional photographers in the period 1920–1940, capturing its people and economic progression and made over 30,000 photographs by 1940.

He moved to the Uzbek capital of Tashkent and from 1926 through to 1949 worked for the largest newspaper in Central Asia, the Pravda Vostoka (Truth of the East). During the 1930s he was particularly prolific in capturing the public engineering works in Uzbekistan and the industrialization of the cotton trade in the country. Penson's images were widely circulated by the Soviet news agency TASS and in 1933 his photographs featured in an extensive volume exploring economic progression in the Soviet Union entitled, USSR: Under Construction.

In 1940 Penson met Sergei Eisenstein who said of him:

"There cannot be many masters left who choose a specific terrain for their work, dedicate themselves completely to and make it an integrated part of their personal destiny. It is, for instance, virtually impossible to speak about the city of Ferghana without mentioning the omnipresent Penson who travelled all over Uzbekistan with his camera. His unparalleled photo archives contain material that enables us to trace a period in the republic's history, year by year and page by page".

== Personal life ==
In 1948 the increase in anti-Semitism under pressure by Joseph Stalin forced Penson to leave his 25-year-long position with the Pravda Vostoka. Penson had three children. His son, Miron Penson, became a prominent cinematographer during the Soviet Era. His grandson, Maxime Penson, is a prominent commercial photographer, publisher, designer, and entrepreneur in Tashkent. Penson's relatives also include Ron Arad, a prominent Israeli designer, artist, and architect, and Atar Arad, an Israeli violinist, in addition to Boris Penson, a prominent Soviet Refusenik who was featured in the documentary Operation Wedding for his role in the Dymshits–Kuznetsov hijacking affair. Max Penson died in 1959 in Uzbekistan.

== Legacy ==
Though many of Penson's pieces were destroyed during the 1966 Tashkent Earthquake, his family was able to recover an impressive portion of his works. A great number of Penson's works are housed in the Moscow House of Photography. In 2006, Russian billionaire Roman Abramovich sponsored an exhibition of Penson's photographs of Uzbekistan in agreement with the Moscow House of Photography on 29 November 2006 at the Gilbert Collection at Somerset House in London. Abramovich had previously funded the exhibition "Quiet Resistance: Russian Pictorial Photography 1900s–1930s" at the same gallery in 2005, also organized by the Moscow House of Photography. Another Gallery that has explored Max Penson's photographic legacy is the Galeyev Gallery, with a personalised exhibition of Penson's work in Moscow (21 September – 31 October 2006). The latest exhibitions of Penson's works were at the Russian Cultural Centre (London)(Commonly known as Pushkin House), from 30 November to 2 December 2010 and at Nailya Alexander Gallery in New York City from 5 April to 13 May 2011.

== Gallery ==
An extended gallery of Penson's works may be found on his website.
